= St Paul's Church, Auckland =

Historic church in Auckland, New Zealand

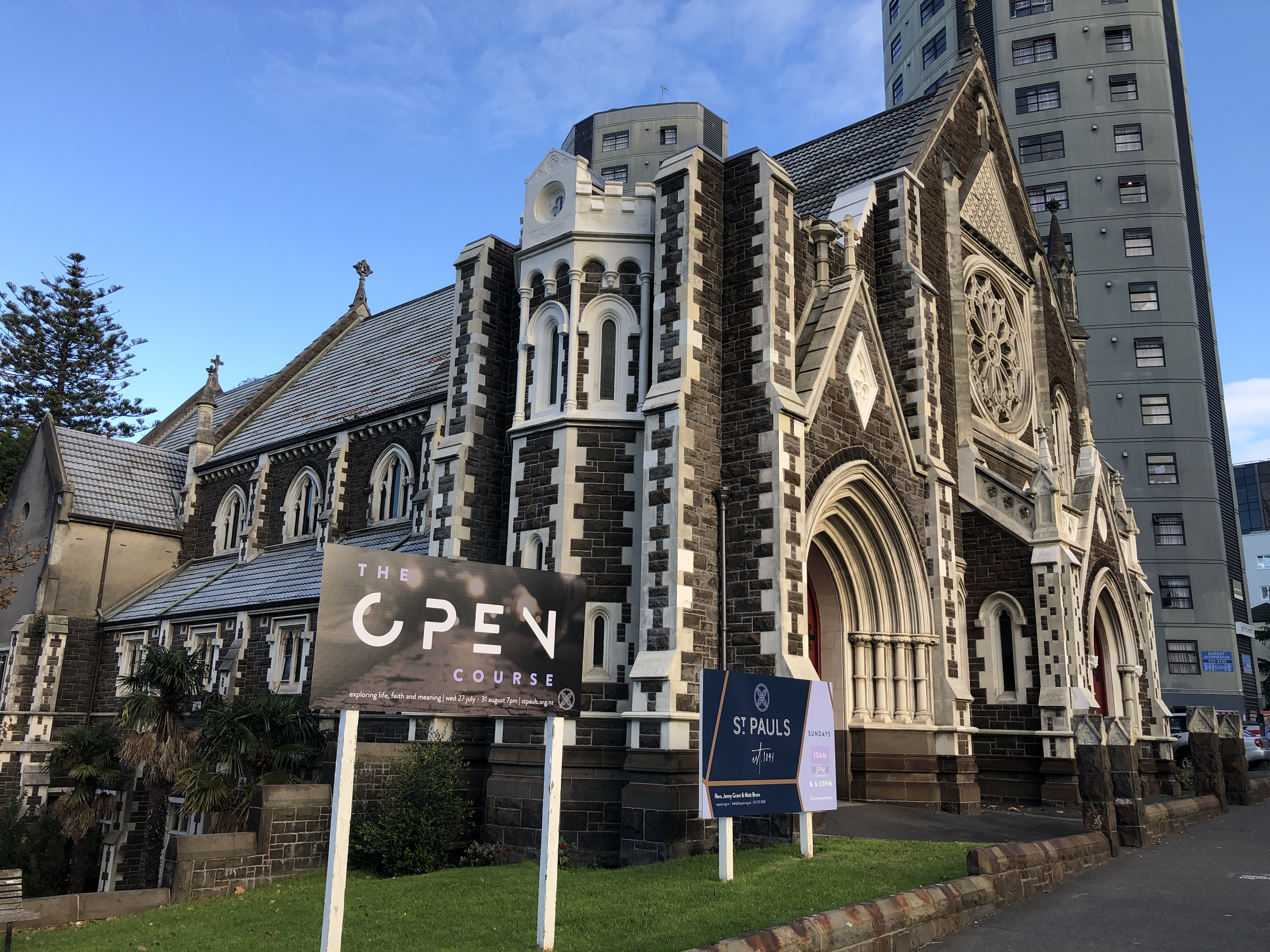
- St Paul's Church, Auckland
- 36°51′16″S 174°46′06″E
- Location: 28 Symonds Street, Auckland
- Country: New Zealand
- Denomination: Anglican
- Churchmanship: Charismatic Evangelical
- Website: www.stpauls.org.nz

History
- Status: Church
- Founded: 1841
- Founder: Governor William Hobson
- Dedicated: 1844, 1894

Architecture
- Functional status: Active
- Heritage designation: Category 1 Historic Place
- Architect: William Henry Skinner
- Style: Gothic Revival
- Years built: 1894-1895

Specifications
- Materials: Rangitoto basalt; Oamaru limestone & Mount Somers / Te Kiekie stone facings & dressings; Timaru bluestone plinths

Administration
- Diocese: Auckland
- Parish: St Paul's Symonds Street

Clergy
- Bishop: Ross Bay
- Vicar: Pete Watson
- Priest(s): Matt Bruns, Ian Yong

Heritage New Zealand – Category 1
- Designated: 16 November 1989
- Reference no.: 650

St Paul's Church is a historic Anglican church, located on Symonds Street near the University of Auckland and Auckland University of Technology, in the central business district of Auckland, New Zealand. The church is the longest established parish in the city and has one of the largest Anglican congregations in Australasia.

The St Paul's foundation stone was laid by Governor William Hobson on 28 July 1841 and the first service was held on 7 May 1843. St Paul's also served as Auckland's Cathedral for over 40 years. The third and current building was formally consecrated by Bishop William Cowie on 1 November 1895, and is now registered as a Category I Historic Place by Heritage New Zealand.

St Paul's is known as the 'Mother Church' of Auckland as it is the oldest church community in the city and was founded within a year of the foundation of the city.

== History ==
=== Early history ===
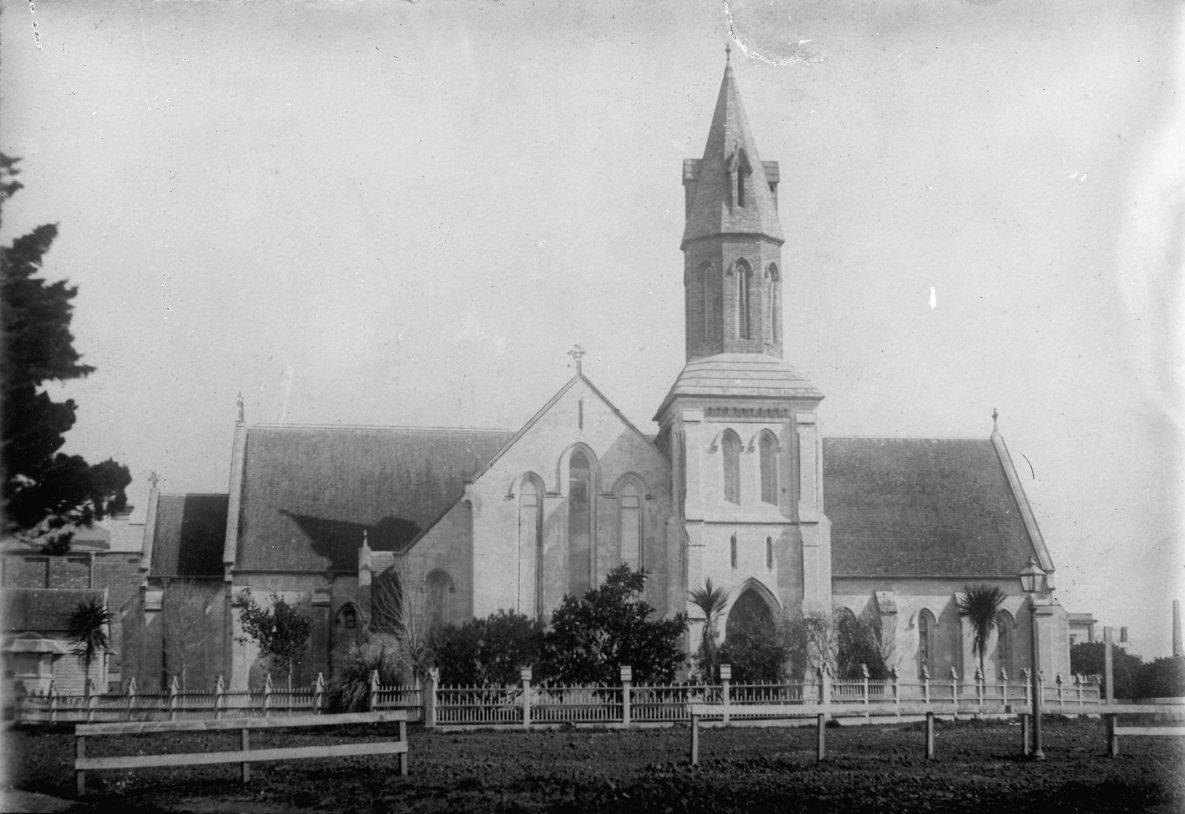
The original St Paul's Church building at Emily Place.

The first St Paul's was built in Emily Place, just off Princes Street, in 1841 where a plaque still marks the site of the beginning of the Anglican Church in Auckland.

St Paul's was the seat of the Bishop of New Zealand, the Right Reverend George Selwyn, and Auckland's wealthiest settlers worshipped there. The religion of British royalty, the Anglican faith was closely linked to colonial power.

When St Paul's was founded by Governor Hobson on 28 July 1841, hundreds attended the ceremony including Ngāti Whātua chiefs Apihai Te Kawau, Te Keene and a young Pāora Tūhaere, accompanied by over one hundred Māori warriors.

Reverend John Churton was the first minister of St Paul's, occupying that role for 12 years.

Bishop Selwyn opened St Paul's Church over four services on 7 May 1843. He later wrote, "The services began with a native congregation at nine; some of whom having only heard of the opening on Saturday evening, paddled a distance of twelve miles by sea during the night, in order to be present. The greater number were in full European clothing, and took part in the Church service, in a manner which contrasts most strikingly with that of the silent and unkneeling congregations of the English settlers." St Paul's then held four Sunday services weekly, serving both Māori and European congregations, with two services conducted in te reo Māori and two in English.

The 1845–1846 Northern War in and around the Bay of Islands, caused by the difference in understanding between the English language Treaty of Waitangi and te reo Māori Te Tiriti o Waitangi, lead to an expectation that Hōne Heke would attack Auckland, and St Paul's was fortified with shutters with loopholes. After hearing rounds of gunfire, the women and children of the town "were put into St Paul’s Church for safety, the one building easily holding the small population then here" and a military guard was posted for the night. The gunfire which caused the unnecessary panic turned out to be "over the body of a chief who had died during the day".

The increasing European population of Auckland put pressure on Māori land and society, straining relations, leading to the city's second Anglican church, St Barnabas being opened in 1849 specifically for Māori.

St Paul's was the pro-cathedral of Bishop of New Zealand for Selwyn's entire 28 year tenure. The New Zealand Church Missionary Society (CMS) criticised Selwyn for being ineffective in training and ordaining clergy – especially Māori. It took him 11 years to ordain the first Māori Anglican minister, Rev Rota Waitoa, at St Paul’s on 22 May 1853, and 24 years to ordain a Māori priest. Selwyn went on to ordain seven more Māori clergy at St Paul's, but his high church ways were blamed for undermining the work of the CMS and damaging Māori enthusiasm for Christianity.

When Churton died in 1853, Selwyn appointed Rev John Frederick Lloyd to replace him. Lloyd was the opposite of Churton – a personal friend of Selwyn with respect for Māori, who spoke te reo, and had tutored mixed Māori and European classes at St John's College. Together they tried to create a bicultural house of worship. After Churton's death a public memorial was built near the church in c.1855.

During the height of the New Zealand Wars in the 1860s, St Paul's was used as a safe haven for women, children and the elderly; a traditional church role in times of strife. After the war moved south, however, and Auckland expanded geographically, the congregation dwindled as attendees moved to the new suburbs of Epsom and Remuera, and St Matthew's in the City served the suburbs of Freemans Bay and Ponsonby, while the Church of the Holy Sepulchre served opulent Grafton.

Selwyn and Lloyd generally advocated for Māori rights and were often critics of the unjust and reckless land acquisition practices that led to the New Zealand Wars. However, their support of the Invasion of the Waikato as chaplains, damaged their and the church's relationship with Māori, which is still felt today.

Old St Paul's was considered a garrison church, but when the first regimental colours unfurled in New Zealand were donated to the church, Lloyd turned them down so "no jealousies of race or feelings of hostility should ever be permitted to enter, but where men should remember only that they are one in Christ".

=== Changing locations ===
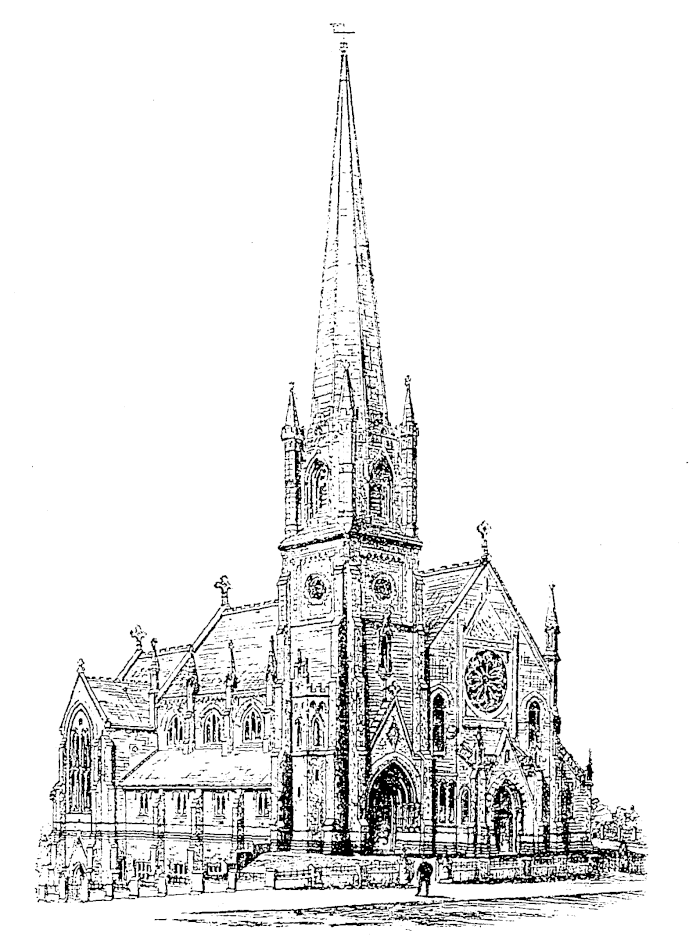
The proposed design for the 1894 St Paul's church building, including the corner tower and steeple that have not yet been completed.

In 1885 Emily Place was cut away by the Auckland Harbour Board for reclamation works at Commercial Bay. This required the demolition of St Paul's Church. Memorial tablets were removed from the church prior to the demolition, these tablets were dedicated to William Hobson, Felton Mathew, George Dean Pitt, and John James Coates, along with many dedicated to military officers. As the Churton Memorial was on public land the church took no role in relocating it. Auckland City Council attempted to relocate the memorial to Albert Park but the monument was accidentally destroyed by the contractor; only the slate tablet remained.

A temporary wooden church, designed by William Skinner, was built on the corner of Short Street and Eden Crescent while a permanent church site was identified. That temporary church is now the Tātai Hono marae, part of the Church of the Holy Sepulchre.

Carved stones from Westminster Abbey, Canterbury Cathedral, York Minster & St Paul's Cathedral were set into the walls.

=== 20th century ===
In 1936 the temporary wooden chancel was replaced with today's concrete chancel, that is yet to be faced in stone.

A week long celebration for the centennial of St Paul's started on 27 July 1941 with a bronze tablet unveiled at the Churton Memorial. Governor Cyril Newall officiated the celebrations. Emphasis was placed on the links between the foundation of the church and the British Empire at a time when New Zealand was fighting alongside Britain in Europe.

In 1954 Father Kenneth Prebble inherited a building and congregation both in a poor state, and for the next 20 years he reestablished St Paul's as a centre of Anglo-Catholicism. In the mid-1960s Prebble looked beyond the norm in terms of high church Anglican practise and embraced a revival of the Holy Spirit. Polarising the congregation, St Paul's became Spirit-focused, evangelical and contemporary while maintaining its Anglo-Catholic theology. Through its popular music, and a regular coffee-shop outreach to students and young people, Prebble and his successor Father David Balfour, helped create a church with city-wide and international impact through the 50s and 60s.

From 1956 to 1973 many repairs and additions were made to the building, including: cleaning, repairing and replacing stonework; replacing the roof; and the addition of the Endean Memorial, Christ in Glory and Patteson Memorial stained glass windows.

In 1974 the St Paul's Outreach Trust was formed and by the end of 1976 had produced three records sung by the St Paul's Singers entitled Songs for Prayer & Praise, Arise my Love and Harvest of Joy, plus songbooks including New Glory.

During the 1980s and 1990s the parish, with the help of its first Māori curate Wally Te Ua, took steps towards a "more significant understanding of biculturalism" and a Friday night gospel service was established which became an outreach to immigrant families and students from Asian countries. The parish also continued taking an active role in supporting women clergy. However, many congregants of the previous period moved away, and only a "tiny remnant" of Anglo-Catholics remained loyal to the church. In 2002 the parish roll had 46 members.

=== 21st century ===
During the late 1990s and early 2000s, many young New Zealanders became Christians or renewed their faith at St Mary's London. Returning home, they wanted a similar church in Auckland. With the blessing of the Bishop of Auckland, a team from St Mary's were invited in 2004 to set up new family and young people-focused services at St Paul's, Symonds Street. Reverend Mike and Bex Norris and a core group of about 80 people whom had previously attended St Mary's in London, oversaw huge growth, with 1,335 members on the parish roll by 2009.

From 2009 to 2013, St Paul's produced the GLOW Carols by Glowstick event at Auckland's Vector Arena, with around 10,000 people attending each year. A key part of the event were Christmas films produced by St Paul's including The Christmas Story which has had 4 million views on YouTube. The 2012 documentary short film O Little Town of Bethlehem was shot in modern Bethlehem. In 2012 St Paul's produced its debut live worship album titled GOD w/ US including the voices of around 800 worshippers gathered across three services.

In 2013 St Paul's priest in charge Reverend Mathew Newton officially asked the Anglican Diocese of Auckland synod to divest from fossil fuel industries due to the threat of climate change. It agreed and became the first New Zealand institutional body to do so.

In 2015 St Paul's published a hard cover book of personal testimonies and photos of 128 children, youth and adults from the church called St Paul's Stories.

From 2015 to 2019, St Paul's produced Alt Carols as an alternative Christmas experience, combining creative elements of music, art and design. Volume One of the remixed carols from the events was released as an album in 2017, Volume Two in 2019.

From 2019 to 2022, St Paul's Restoration leader Esther Grant, heritage & conservation architects Salmond Reed Architects and structural & seismic engineers worked to repair, strengthen and refresh the church building. Seismic strengthening was needed to reach building standards changed after the 2011 Christchurch earthquake. On 5 March 2020, Ngāti Whātua Ōrākei led a blessing for the work, and St Paul's thanked the descendants of Apihai Te Kawau for the gift of the land on which the church was built. Huge timelines telling the stories of Ngāti Whātua Ōrākei and St Paul's were installed side by side on the scaffold hoardings during the Phase 2 work that was completed in 2020. Future work planned includes renewing the main roof with slate, further increasing seismic strength, restoring the interior, installing stained glass in the clerestory and building the spire.

In 2020, Reverend Dr Nathan McLellan was ordained as a priest into the tikanga Māori Te Pīhopatanga o Te Tai Tokerau and, uniquely, was then licensed by Bishop Ross Bay to minister at St Paul’s, which is a part of the tikanga pākehā Auckland Anglican Diocese.

Due to government and diocese restrictions during the 2020 to 2022 COVID-19 pandemic, for a total 52 weeks St Paul's, led by vicar Reverend Jonny Grant, replaced services and events in its buildings with 400 pre-recorded and live online videos that received a total of 436,700 views, including its first online-only Christmas services in 2021.

On 13 December 2023, Reverend Pete Watson was inducted as the 13th Vicar of St Paul's. He came from the Wellington Diocese where he was Vicar of Masterton and Archdeacon of Wairarapa.

In 2025, St Paul's had 690 people over 18 years old on the parish roll, and a staff of 17 which included a vicar, two assistant priests, a worship leader, four other full time employees, three part time, three additional Sunday workers and three contractors.

== Discography ==
=== St Paul's Singers ===
- Songs for Prayer & Praise, album (1974)
- Arise my Love, album (1974)
- Harvest of Joy, album (1975)
- New Harvest, album (1981)

=== St Paul's Music ===
- GOD w/ US, live album (2012)
- Creation's King, single (2014)
- Alt Carols, compilation EP (2016)
- Alt Carols, Vol. 1, compilation album (2017)
- Alt Carols, Vol. 1.5, compilation EP (2018)
- Alt Carols, Vol. 2, compilation album (2019)
- See Again (Bartimaeus), single (2020)
- You Are My Desire, single (2022)
- Garden, single (2024)
- At the Table, single (2026)

== Bibliography ==
=== St Paul's Outreach Trust ===
- Arise my Love – song book (1974)
- Harvest of Praise (1975)
- New Glory – songs of renewal (1976)
- New Harvest (1980)
- To God be the Glory – the first 10½ years of the charismatic renewal in St Paul's (1981)
- A Brief History of St Paul's Symonds Street (1991)

=== St Paul's ===
- St Paul's Stories (2015)

== Videography ==
=== SPAM (St Paul's Arts & Media) ===
- The Christmas Prophecy (2006)
- Google Earth Christmas (2006)
- Open (2007)
- The Open Post 1&2 (2007)
- Open – Alice (2007)
- Family – An Exploration (2007)
- The Big Little Easter Story 1&2 (2009)
- O Little Town of Bethlehem (2012)
- 766 Christmases (2013)
- Star of Wonder (2016)
- Gold Frankincense Myrrh (2017)
- Stained Historical Stories – Talks 1–4 (2018)
- This is Christmas (2019)
- Palm Sunday Reading (2020)
- Easter Sunday Reading (2020)
- Christmas, I Choose to Remember (2020)
- Common Christmas Questions (2020)
- The Stories of Advent 1–6 (2021)
- Jesus Meets His Mother (2022)

=== St Paul's ===
- Life (2007)
- How We're Doing It (2009)
- Life Questions (2011)
- GLOW Event Opening (2011)
- Date My Mate NZ (2012)
- International Students (2013)
- Life Course (2013)
- Mike & Bex 10 Years (2013)
- Twins and Twins (2014)
- GLOW Promo (2014)
- Visual Identity (2018)
- Big Issues (2020)
- Restoration Update (2020)
- The Story of St Paul's (so far ...) (2021)
- The Open Course (2021)
- The Evening Service (2022)
- 400 pre-recorded and live online service, prayer, youth and kids videos, during COVID-19 restrictions (2020–21)

=== SPANK (St Paul's Arts 'n' Kids) ===
- When God Was Born (2008)
- Boys (2009)
- The Christmas Story (2010)
- Good News of Great Joy (2011)
- My Mum (20012)
- An Unexpected Christmas (2012)
- Star News Bethlehem (2013)
- The Story of the Whole Bible (2019)

=== St Paul's Music ===
- GOD w/ US 1–14 (2012, 2014)
- Creation's King (2014)
- Alt Carols 1–5 (2016)
- See Again (Bartimaeus) 1&2 (2020)
- You Are My Desire (2022)
- Garden (2024)
- At the Table (2026)

== Gallery ==
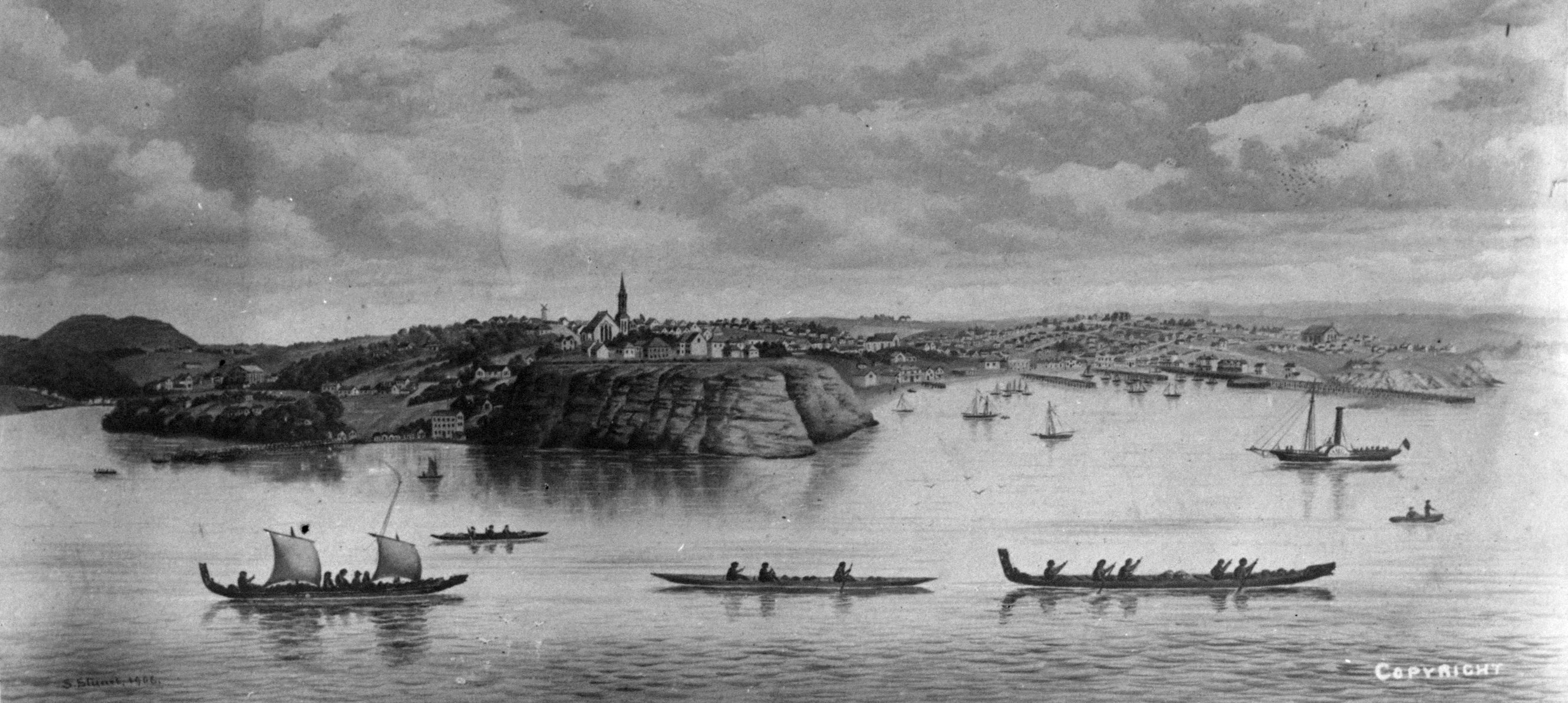
The Auckland waterfront with Māori waka and the original St Paul's building above Point Britomart, painted in 1852.

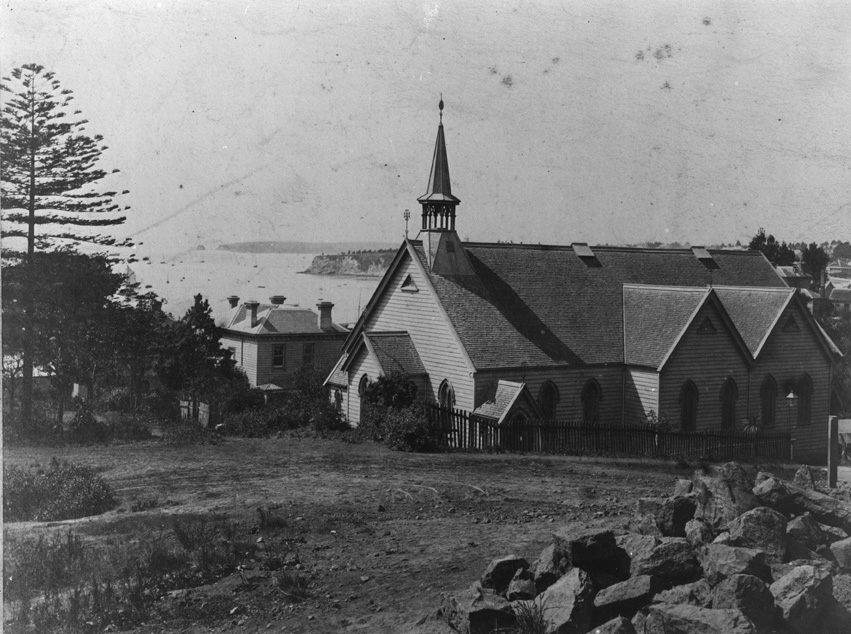
The temporary St Paul's building photographed in the 1880s.

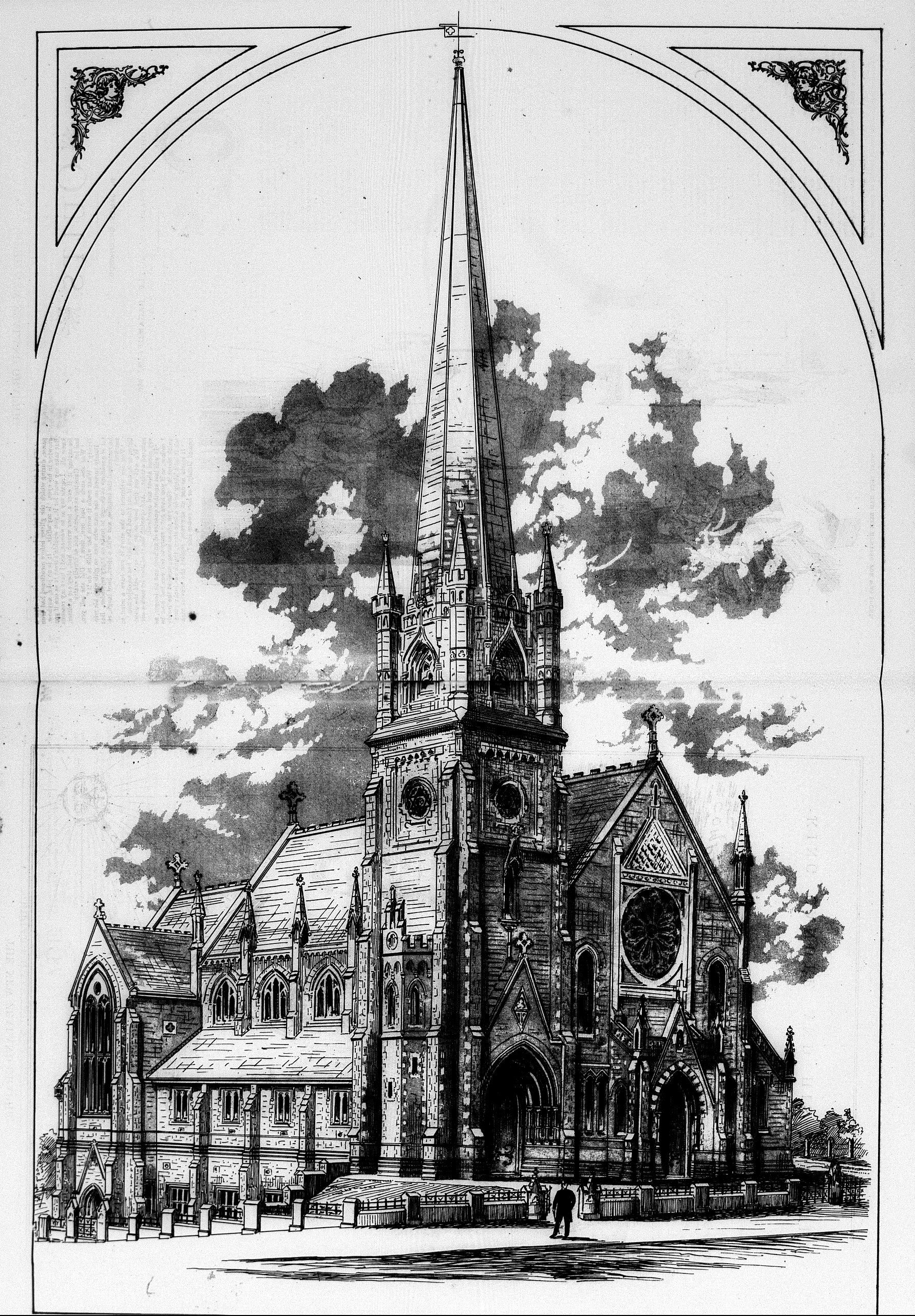
Architect's perspective of the third building published in 1894, showing the unbuilt steeple.

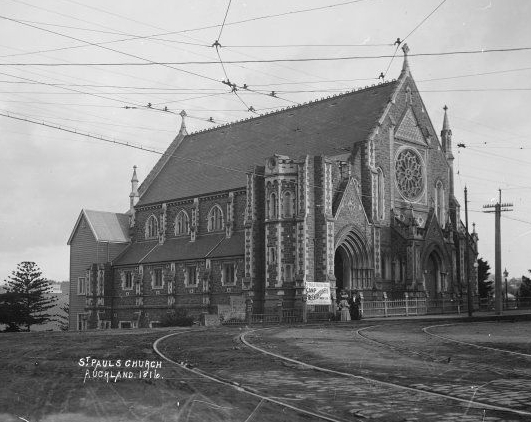
The third and current St Paul's building photographed in 1909.

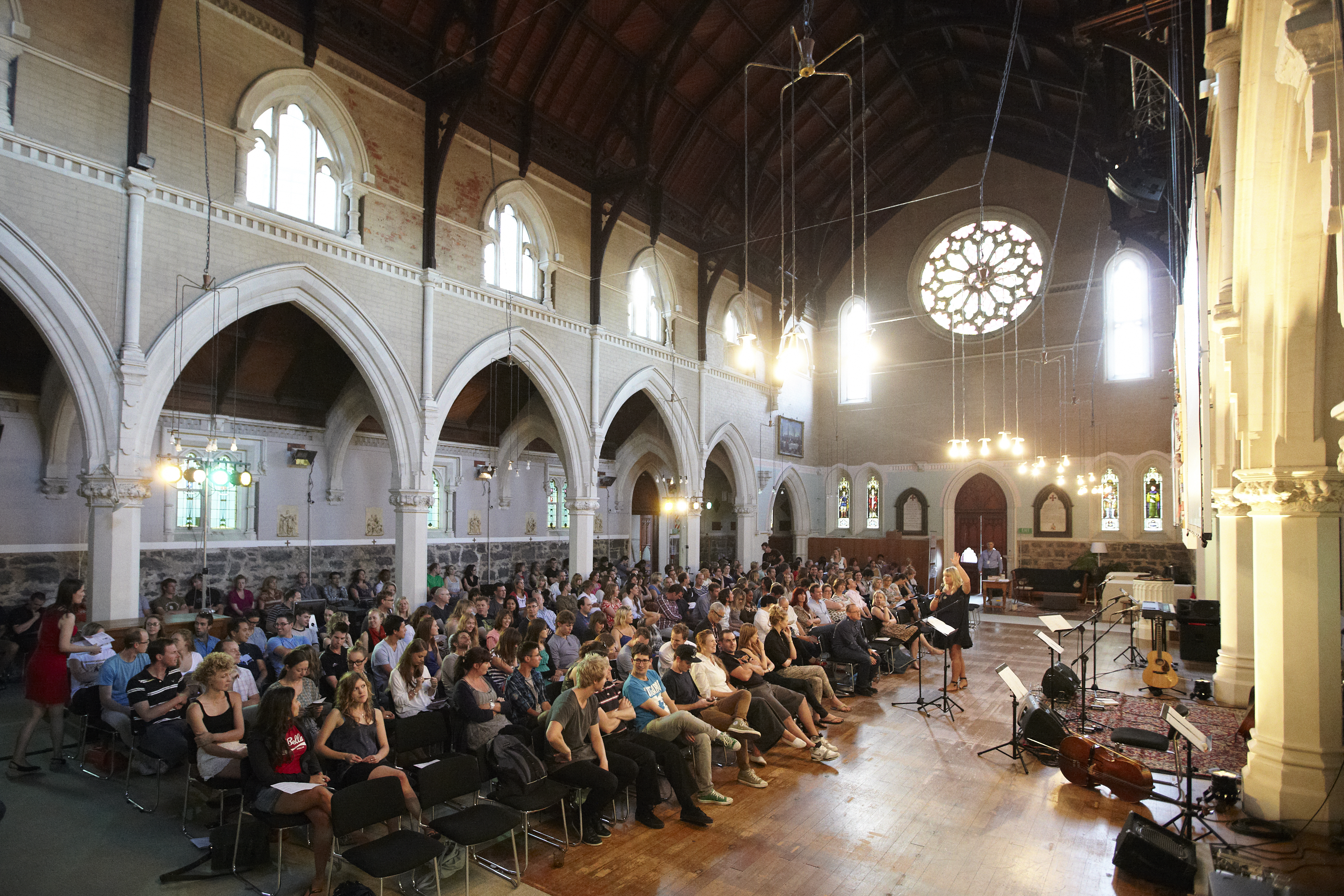
A St Paul's Evening Service, 2012.

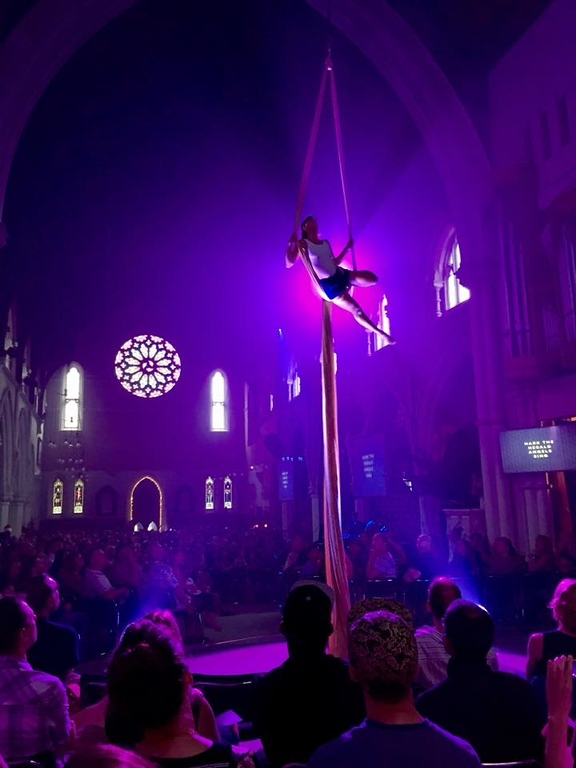
A St Paul's artist performs at Alt Carols for Christmas 2017.

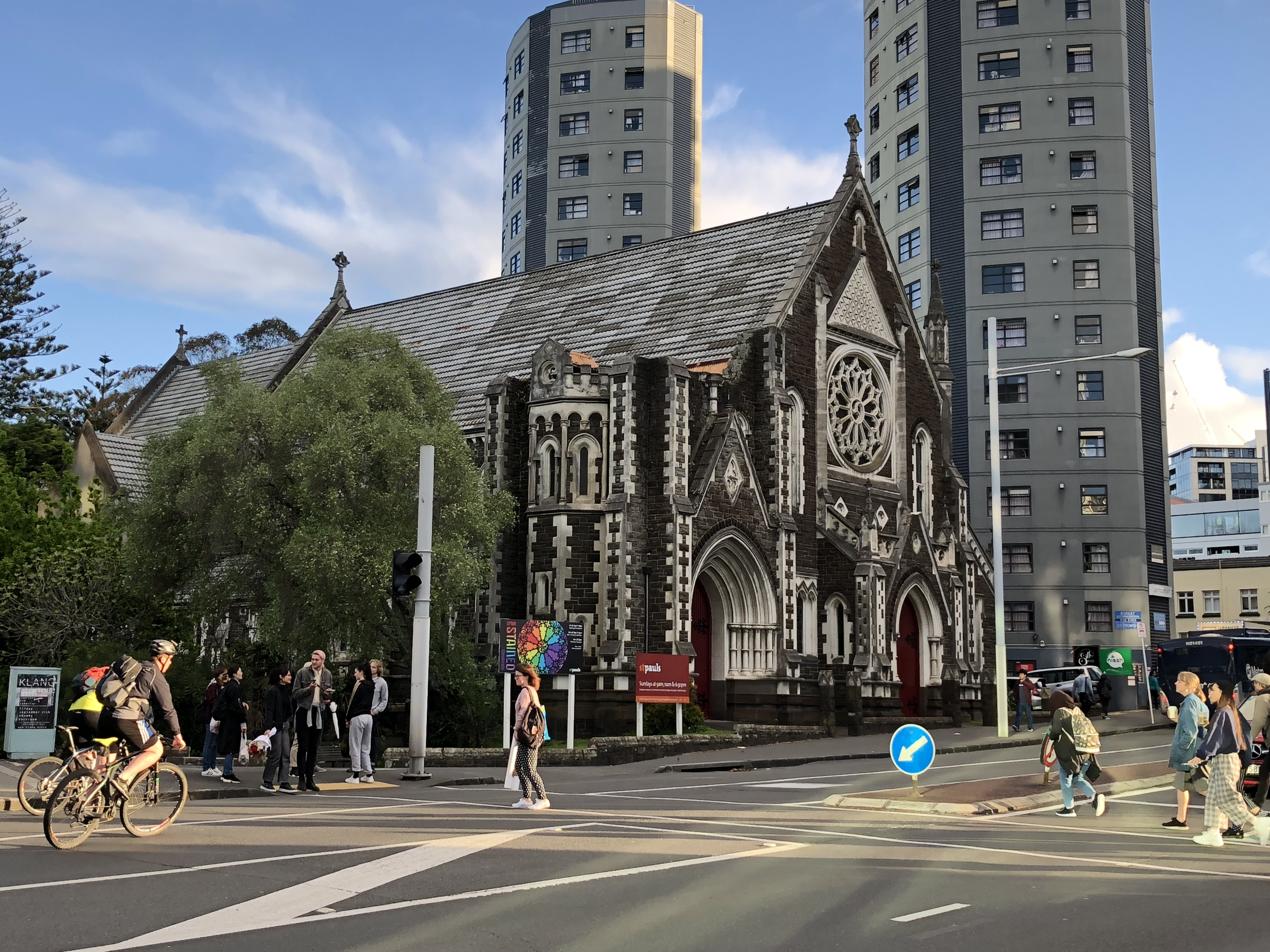
St Paul's on Symonds Street, 2018.

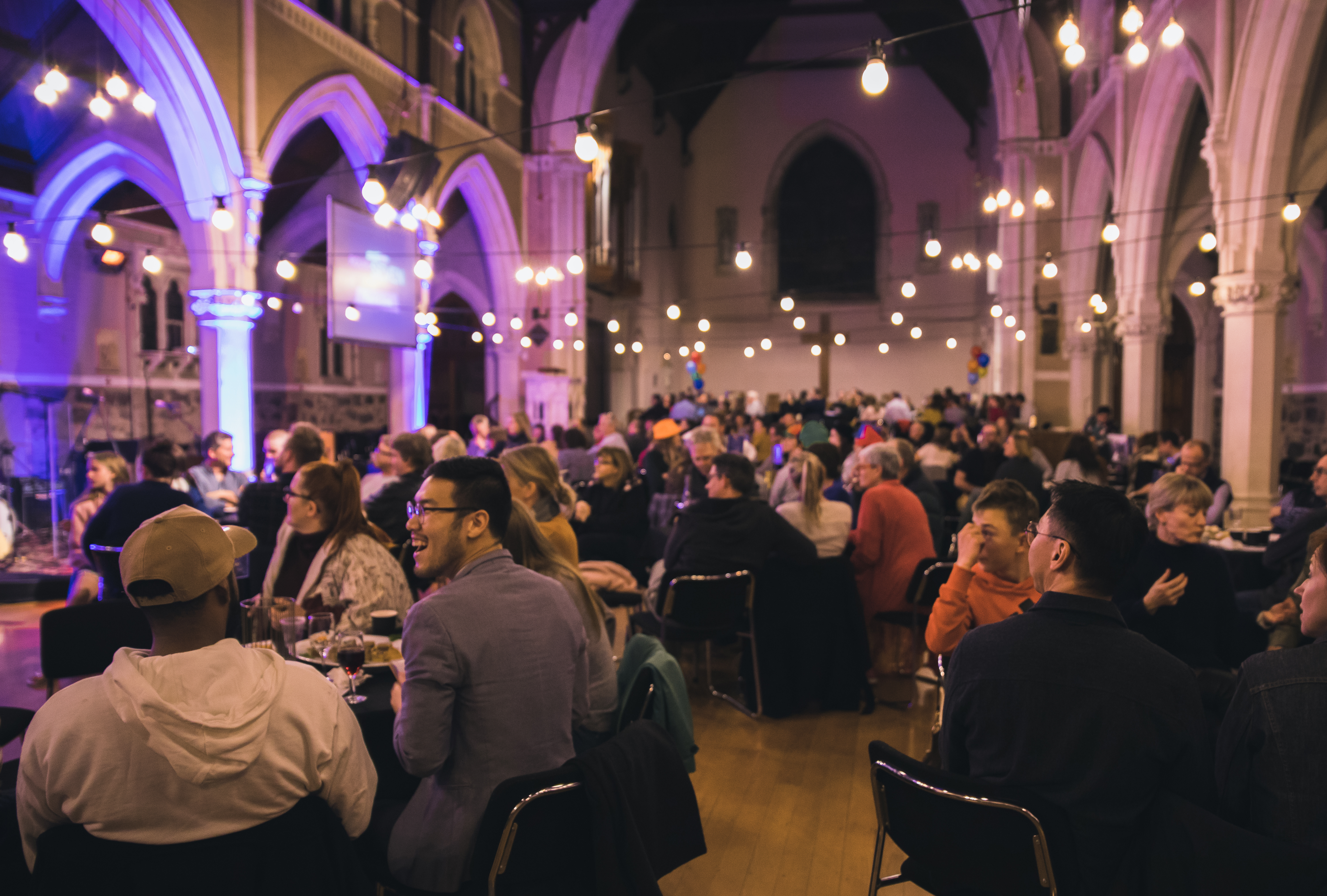
St Paul's community participating in an annual Quiz Night, 2019.

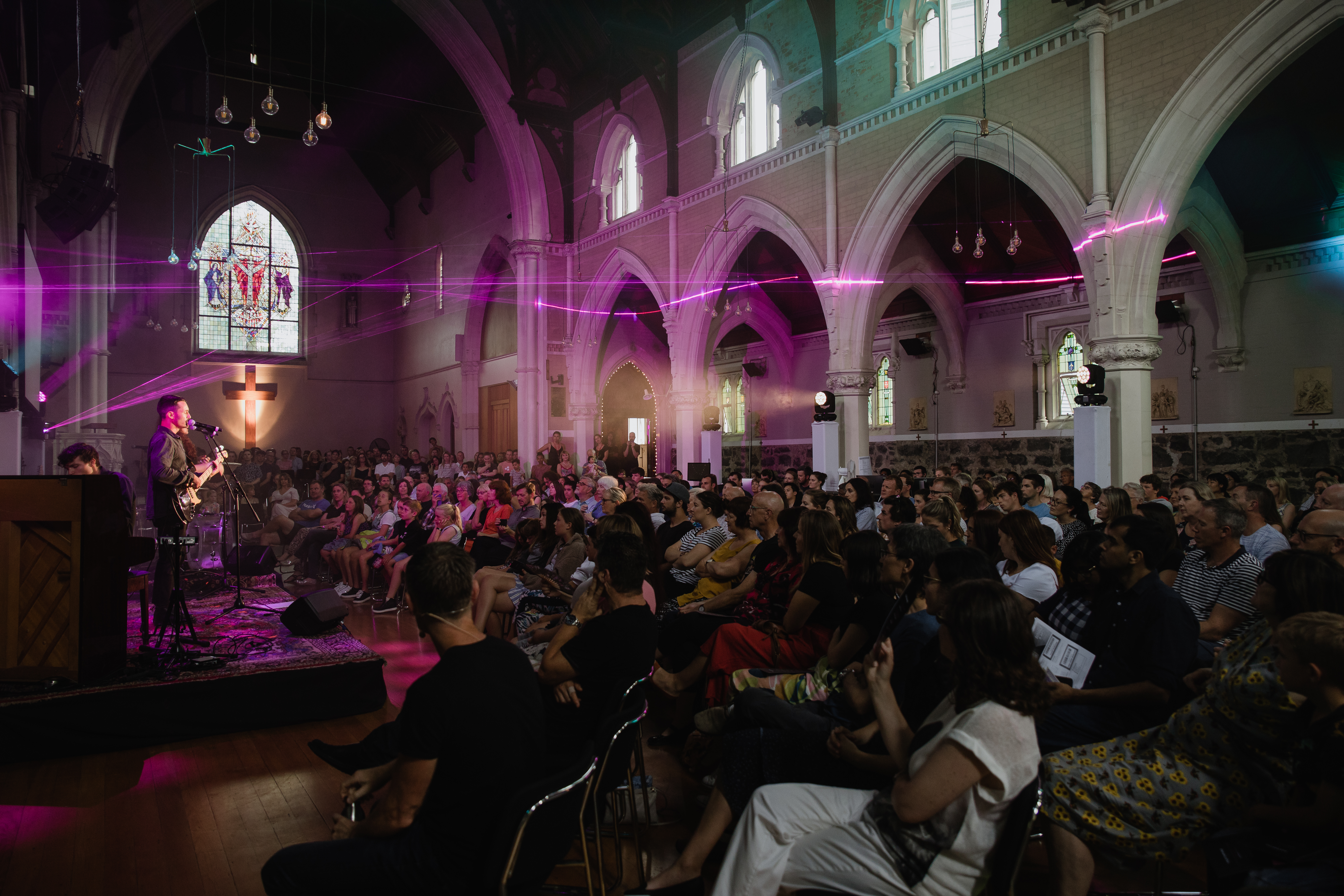
Artists perform at Alt Carols for Christmas 2019.

Building restoration scaffold wrap, including Ngāti Whātua Ōrākei and St Paul's timelines, 2020.

== Windows gallery ==
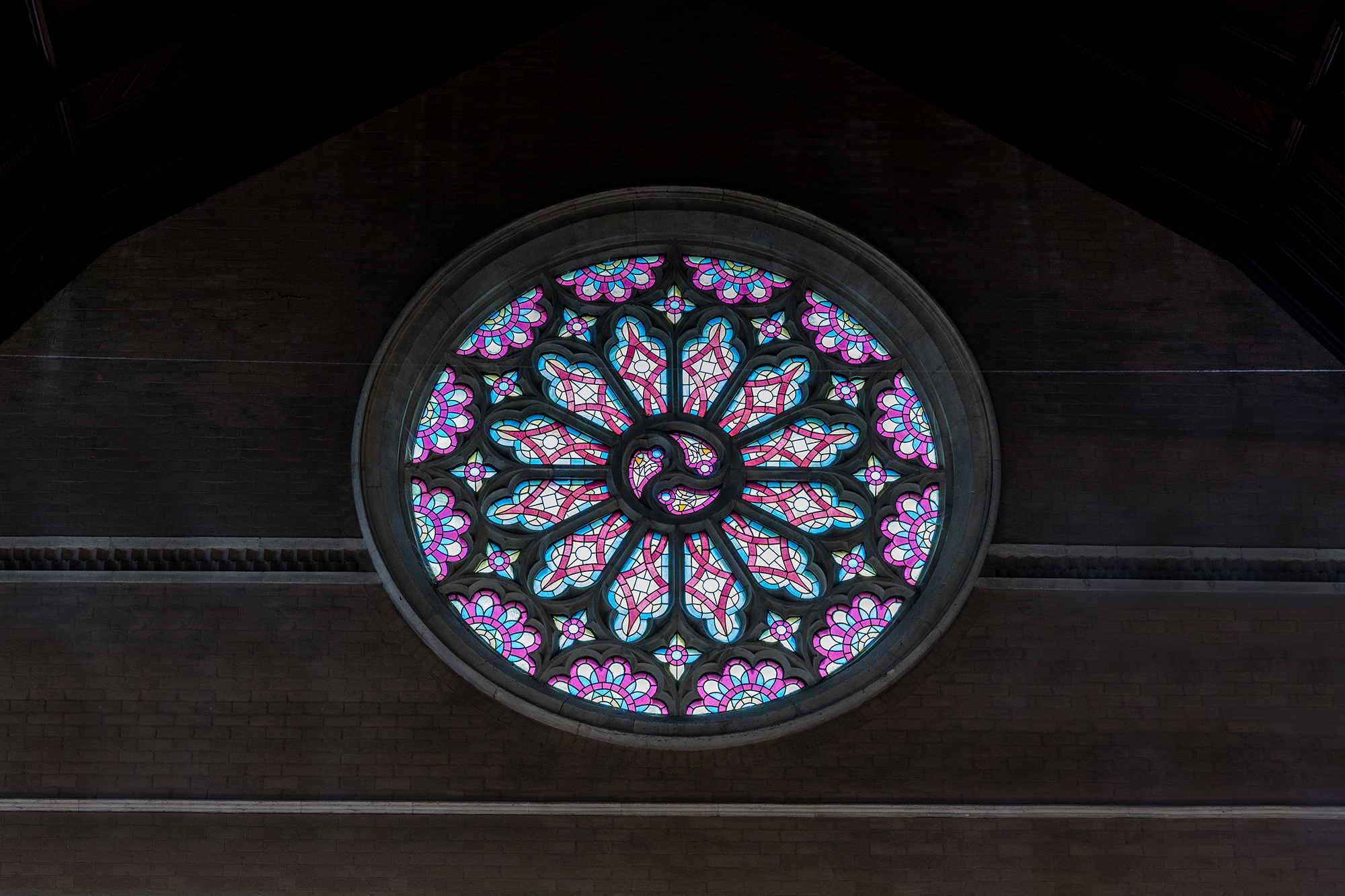
The large western Rose Window, with tracery designed by William Henry Skinner, glazed with cathedral glass, was the only stained glass installed during construction, 1895.

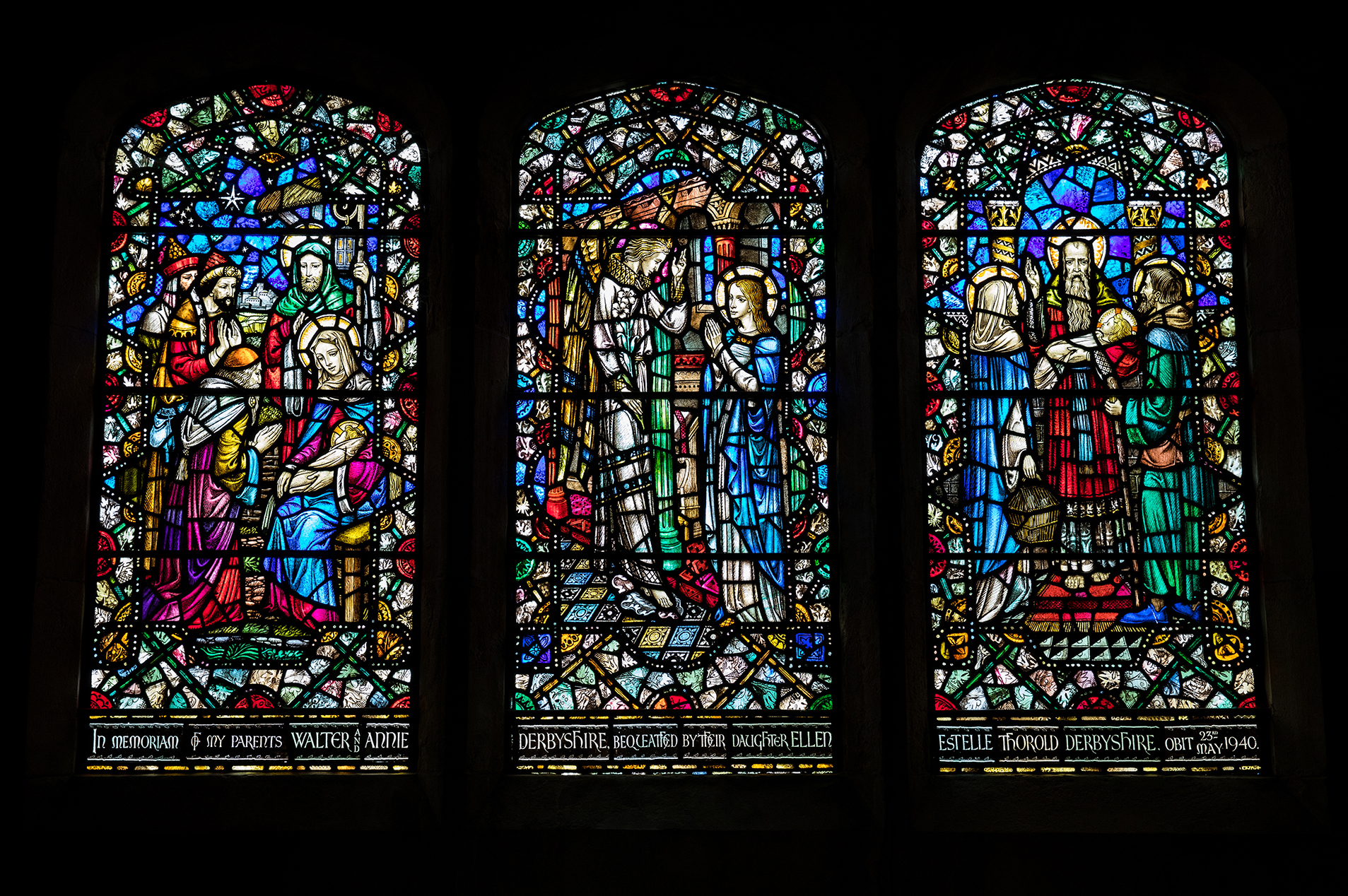
The northern Derbyshire Window, by James Powell and Sons a.k.a. Whitefriars Glass, in the Lady Chapel, depicting the Adoration of the Magi, Annunciation and Presentation of Jesus at the Temple, 1951.

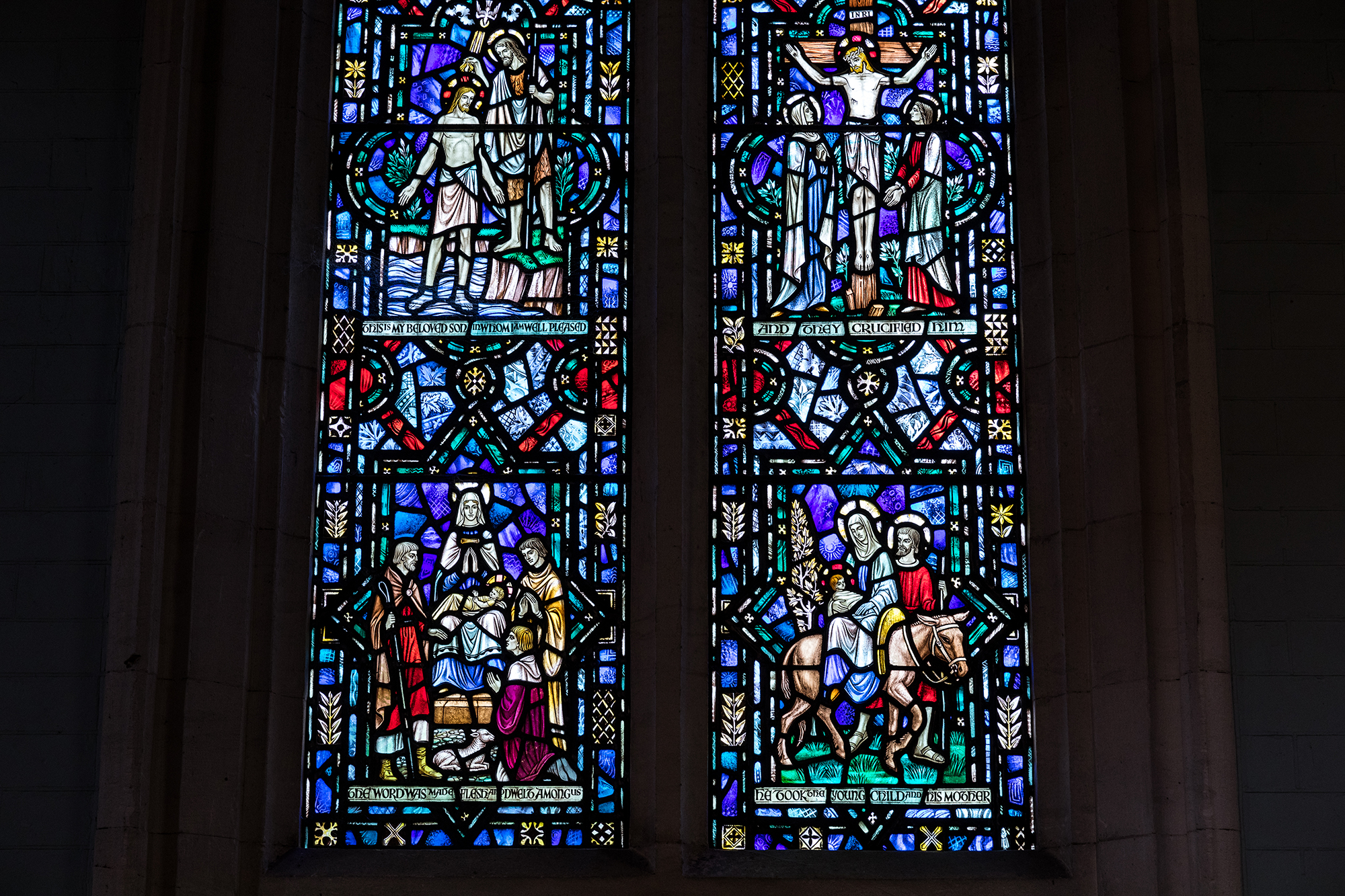
The southern Endean Memorial Window, by James Powell and Sons a.k.a. Whitefriars Glass, in the Requiem Chapel, depicting the Baptism of Jesus, Adoration of the Shepherds, Crucifixion of Jesus and Flight into Egypt, 1959.

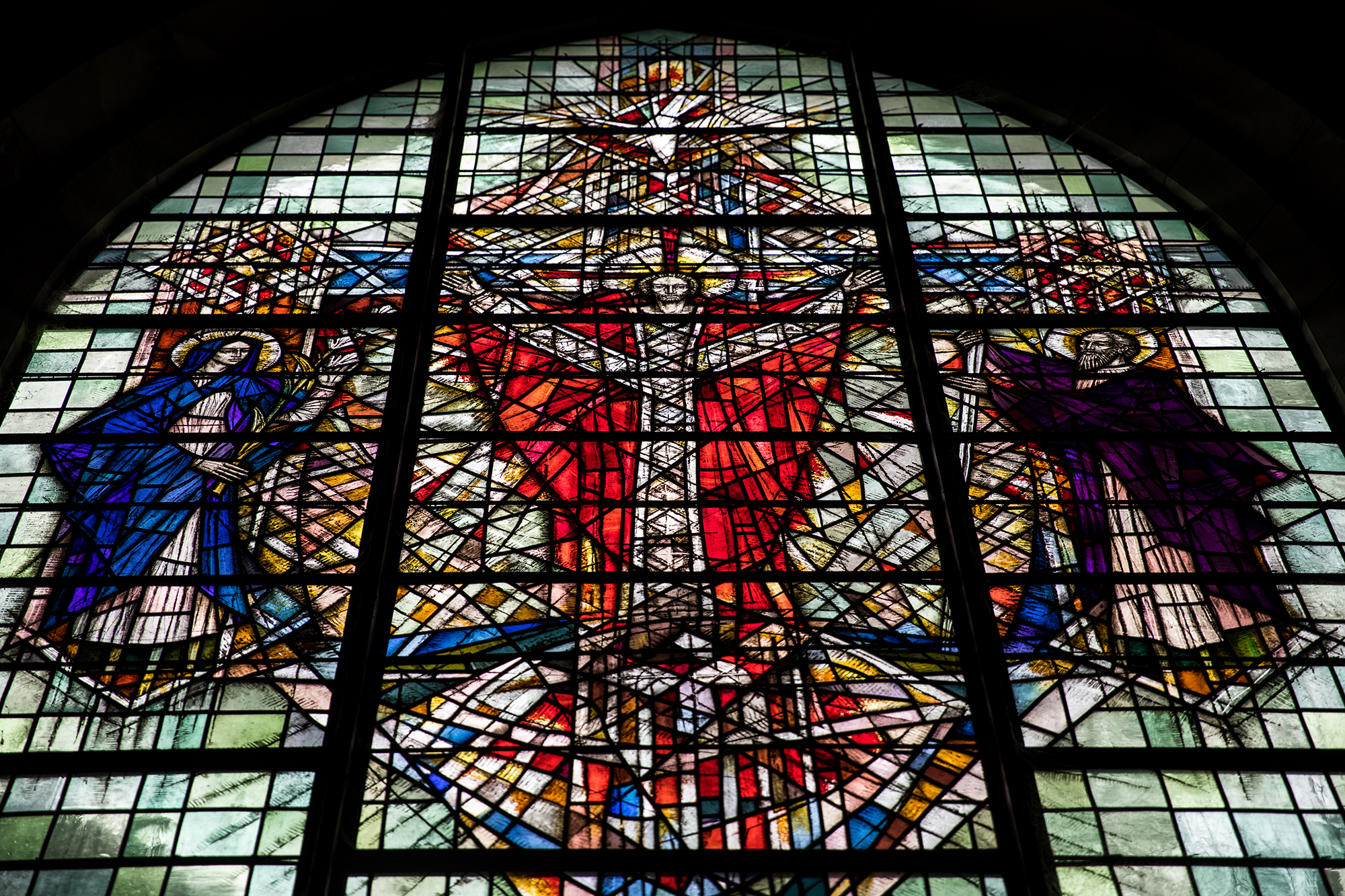
The large eastern Christ in Majesty Window, designed by Lawrence Lee, Royal College of Art, in the Chancel, depicting Mary, mother of Jesus, Jesus, Paul the Apostle, a dove symbolising the Holy Spirit and an eye symbolising God the Father, 1967.

== List of vicars ==
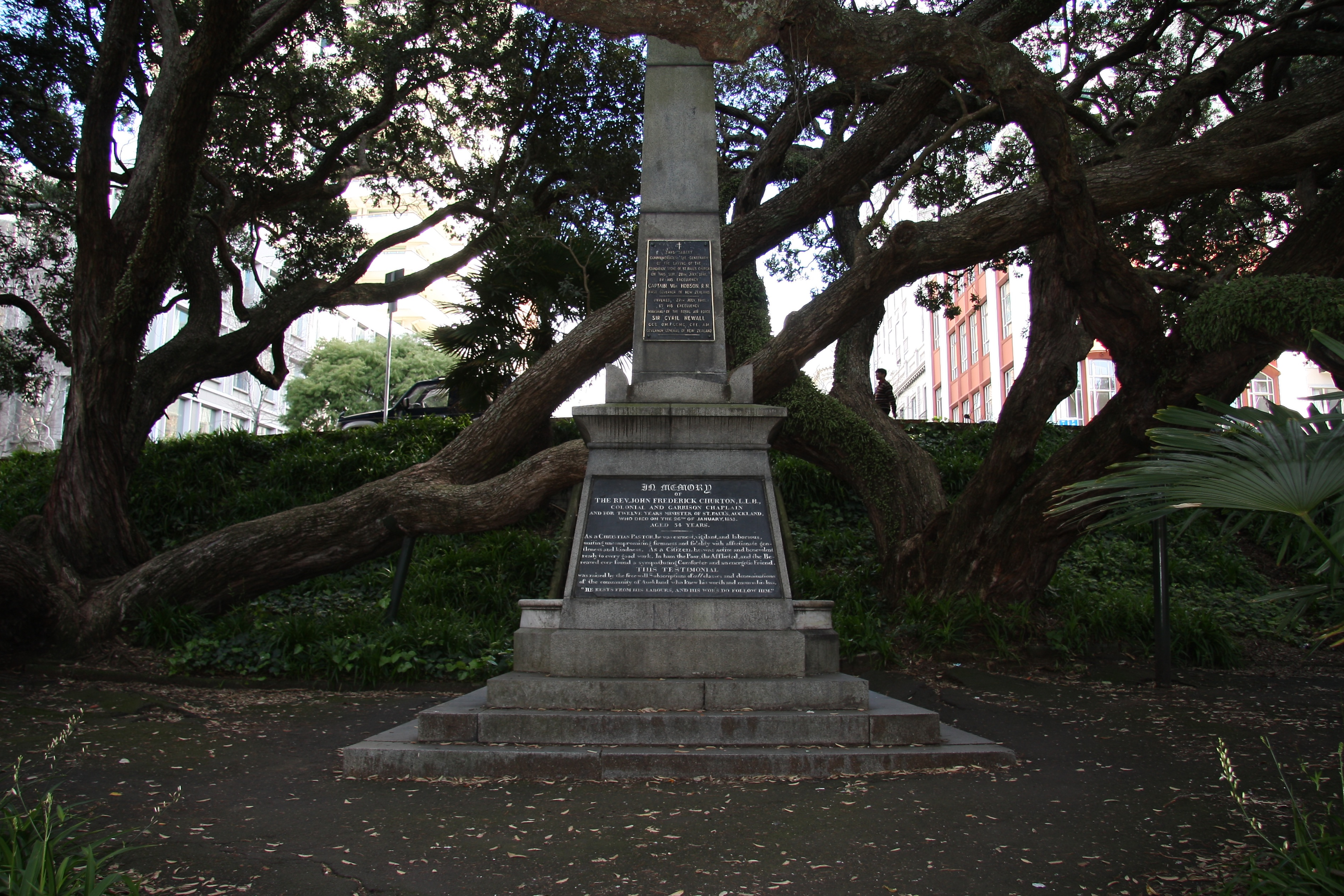
Memorial to Rev John Frederick Churton, located at Emily Place Reserve, close to the site of the original St Paul's building, photographed in 2012.

- Reverend John Frederick Churton 1841–1853 Emily Place
- Archdeacon John Fredrick Lloyd 1853–1870 Emily Place
- Canon Charles Mosely Nelson 1870–1908 Emily Place, Eden Terrace & Symonds Street
- Reverend Cecil Alexander Burns Watson 1908–1942 Symonds Street
- Canon Samuel Bertram Roberts Corbin 1942–1953 Symonds Street
- Father Kenneth Prebble 1954–1974 Symonds Street
- Father David Balfour 1975–1984 Symonds Street
- Reverend William Heald 1984–1993 Symonds Street
- Reverend Nicholas James Schoombee 1994–2001 Symonds Street
- Reverend Harvey Jackson Smith 2003–2005 Symonds Street
- Reverend Michael Charles Latham Norris 2005–2013 Symonds Street
- Reverend Jonathan Stephen Grant 2015–2022 Symonds Street
- Reverend Peter Keith Watson 2023–Present Symonds Street
