= Monty Monteith =

Anglican dean (1904–2003)

George Rae "Monty" Monteith (14 February 1904 – 12 June 2003) was the Dean of Auckland from 1949 until 1969; Vicar general of the Diocese of Auckland from 1963; and an Assistant Bishop there from 1965. Born in Mangatainoka, Monteith was educated at the University of New Zealand and ordained in 1929. His first post was a curacy at St Matthew, Auckland. He was Vicar of Dargaville from 1934 to 1937, and then Mount Eden. He was consecrated a bishop on 24 February 1965 and served til his death.

Anglican Communion titles
Preceded by Sydney Gethin Caulton	Dean of Auckland; 1949–1969	Succeeded by John Oliver Rymer
