= Holy Trinity Cathedral, Auckland =

Anglican place of worship in New Zealand

Holy Trinity Cathedral
- Cathedral of the Holy Trinity
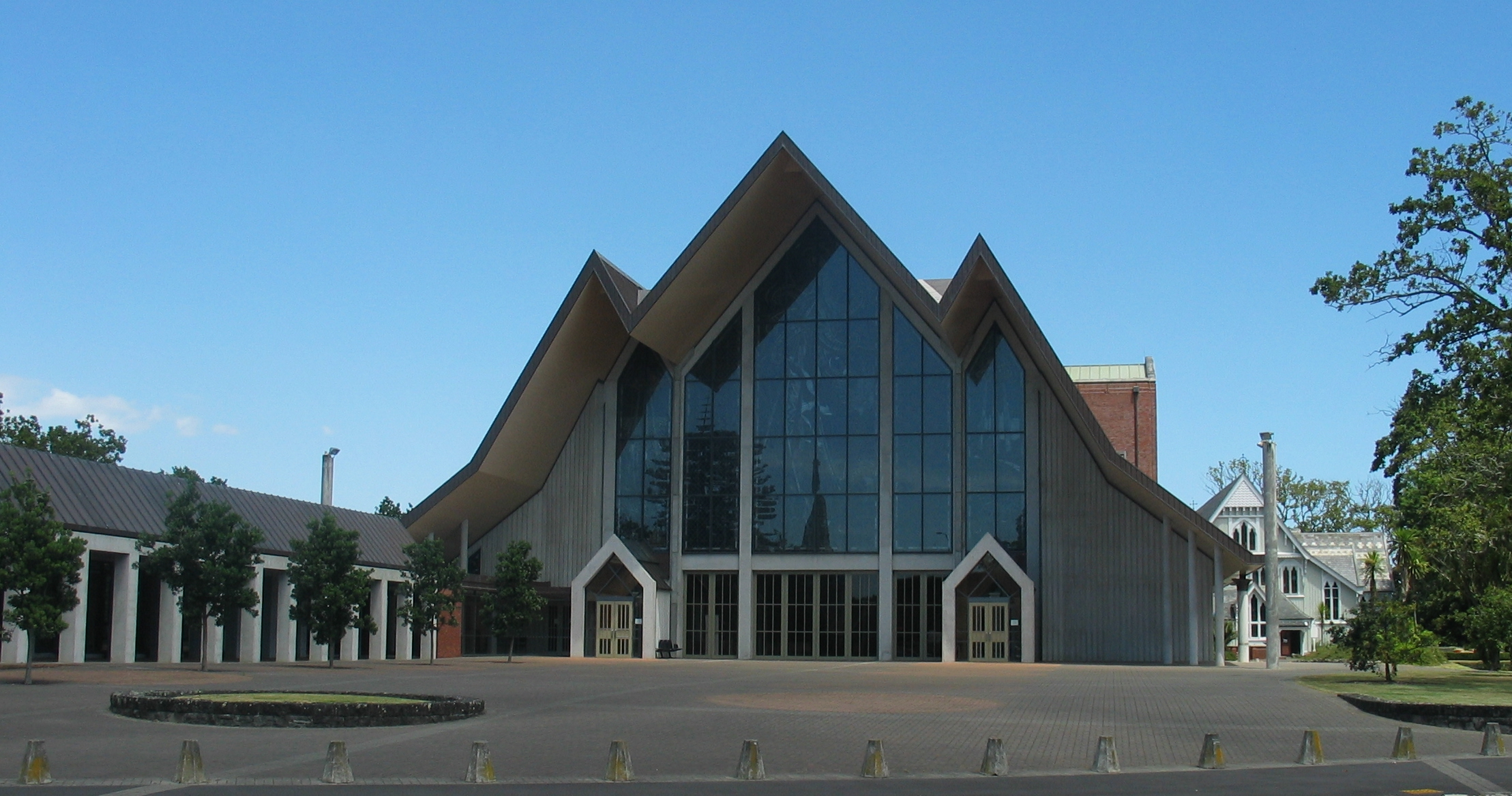
- Holy Trinity Cathedral, Auckland. The main façade hints at features of the elevation of the older wooden cathedral just visible behind it
- Holy Trinity Cathedral
- Address: Parnell, Auckland
- Country: New Zealand
- Denomination: Anglican
- Website: www.holy-trinity.org.nz

History
- Status: Cathedral
- Founded: 1957
- Founder: Bishop John Simkin
- Dedication: Holy Trinity
- Consecrated: 28 October 2017 by Bishop Ross Bay

Architecture
- Functional status: Active
- Architects: Richard Toy; John Sinclair
- Architectural type: Church
- Years built: 1961 – 1965

Specifications
- Capacity: 1,250 parishioners

Administration
- Province: New Zealand
- Diocese: Auckland
- Parish: Cathedral of the Holy Trinity

Clergy
- Bishop: Rt. Rev. Ross Bay
- Dean: Very Rev. Anne Mills

Holy Trinity Cathedral is an Anglican cathedral situated in Parnell, a residential suburb of Auckland, New Zealand. It is the 'mother church' of the Anglican Diocese of Auckland and the seat of the Bishop of Auckland. The current main church building was consecrated in 1973.

== History ==
=== St Paul's Church ===
The first Anglican parish in Auckland was located in St Paul's, which was founded in 1841, within a year of the foundation of the city, and is known as the 'mother church' of the city. The first St Paul's building was in Emily Place, just off Princes Street, where a plaque still marks the site of the beginning of the Anglican Church in Auckland. St Paul's was the seat of the Bishop of New Zealand, the Right Reverend George Selwyn, for his entire 28-year tenure and served as Auckland's cathedral for over 40 years.

=== St Barnabas' Parish Church ===
The increasing European population of Auckland put pressure on Māori land and society, straining relations, leading to the city's second Anglican church, St Barnabas, being opened in 1849 specifically for Māori. It was situated near the bottom of Parnell, on land that was later demolished and used for reclamation work. The small church building was shifted to Mount Eden, where it still forms part of the St Barnabas' Parish Church.

=== Cathedral Church of St Mary ===
With the building of the original St Mary's Church in 1860, Bishop Selwyn established the Parish of St Mary. Old St Mary's stood on the site of the present cathedral, but proved to be too small, badly ventilated and uncomfortable. The establishment of New Zealand's dioceses, and Auckland's fast-growing population, meant that a larger church was required. Old St Mary's Church was demolished, and in 1886 work started on land opposite to build a new Cathedral Church of St Mary. This wooden Gothic Revival church was designed by the prominent New Zealand architect Benjamin Mountfort and completed in 1897. The building served as the cathedral church and principal Anglican church in Auckland until 1973 when the chancel of Holy Trinity Cathedral, for which the foundation stone was laid in 1957, came into use. In 1982, St Mary's Church was moved across Parnell Road to its present site beside the cathedral.

The celebrated harpsichordist, organist, and conductor Anthony Jennings was music director at the cathedral from 1974 through 1985; during which time several recordings were made of the cathedral's choir.

== Diocese and cathedral ==
1941 design of Holy Trinity

Today the Diocese of Auckland is one of seven dioceses of the Tikanga Pākehā (Pākehā culture) stream of the Anglican Church in Aotearoa, New Zealand and Polynesia. The diocese covers the area stretching from North Cape south to the Waikato River, across the Hauraki Plains and including the Coromandel Peninsula.

The Anglican church in New Zealand, today known as the Anglican Church in Aotearoa, New Zealand and Polynesia, was pioneered by Bishop George Selwyn who arrived as Bishop of New Zealand in 1841.

In those early days the then colony was regarded as one huge diocese which, including large areas of the South Pacific, covered almost one sixth of the Earth's surface. Selwyn did much to establish the church and many small chapels, churches, schools and a theological college were built during this period. In 1856 Selwyn created New Zealand's first diocese, Christchurch.

Following the adoption of the Constitution of the Church of the Province of New Zealand, which was signed in St Stephen's Chapel, Judges Bay, Auckland, on 13 June 1857, other dioceses were soon established: Nelson and Waiapu in 1858, and Wellington in 1859. Following the creation of the dioceses Selwyn became ipso facto the Bishop of Auckland (though never formally styled as such), while retaining the primacy and continuing as the metropolitan. In diaries kept by his contemporary, Attorney-General William Swainson, Auckland was at that time expected to be the permanent seat of the Metropolitan of New Zealand.

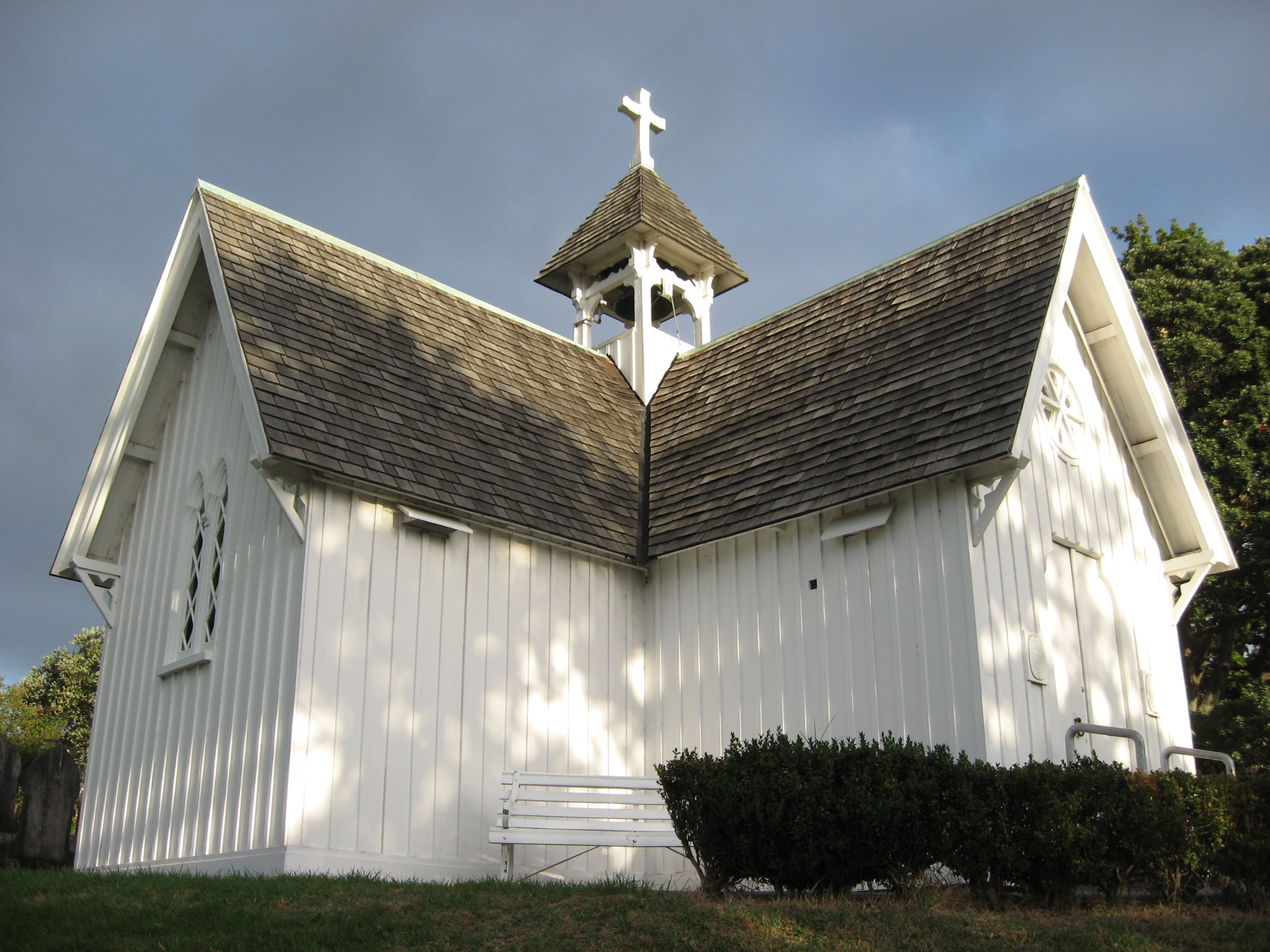
St Stephen's Chapel, Auckland

In 1843 Selwyn purchased land in Parnell for the cathedral, as well as for St Stephen's Chapel, Bishopscourt, and associated buildings. He wrote in his diary on 3 June 1843 "... I reached the Judge's House [Judge Martin; First Attorney-General] by a path, avoiding the town, and passed over land which I have bought for the site of the Cathedral ... ". He is reputed to have included the intended name for the cathedral in a sermon at Lichfield Cathedral in 1841 after his consecration.

Selwyn returned to England in 1868 having selected William Cowie as his successor. Cowie was the first bishop to be known as Bishop of Auckland, and it may be considered that this was the year of the formation of the Diocese of Auckland, though it is generally said to be 1841. The Diocese of Dunedin, formerly part of the Christchurch Diocese, was created in 1869.

During Bishop Cowie's 33-year tenure, the last nine as primate, the diocesan administration was set up in the traditional Anglican understanding of the term. When the dioceses were firmly established, each with its bishop, the building of New Zealand's cathedrals began.

ChristChurch Cathedral was one of the first: begun in 1864, it was finally consecrated in 1881. It had been intended to build a cathedral seating 1000 people in Auckland but by 1883 the plan was abandoned because of cost. Instead, a decision was made to replace the existing small church of St Mary's in Parnell with a larger church, and in 1884 work began. The new church was designated a cathedral in 1887 while uncompleted, and a cathedral chapter of clerical canons and lay members was formed in 1893 while the new cathedral was in use but still awaiting completion.

By 1926 the Auckland diocese was very large and becoming densely populated, so The Most Revd AW Averill, Bishop of Auckland and Archbishop of New Zealand, divided off the southern regions of Waikato, King Country and Taranaki to form the Diocese of Waikato.

== Buildings ==
=== St Mary's Church ===
St Mary's Church is the former cathedral church of the Anglican Diocese of Auckland. It replaced the earlier Old St Mary's. This wooden Gothic Revival church was designed by the prominent Christchurch architect Benjamin Mountfort and completed in 1897. The building served as the cathedral church and principal Anglican church of Auckland until 1973 when the chancel of Holy Trinity Cathedral, for which the foundation stone was laid in 1957, came into use. In 1982, St Mary's Church was moved across Parnell Road to its present site beside the cathedral.

=== Cathedral of the Holy Trinity ===
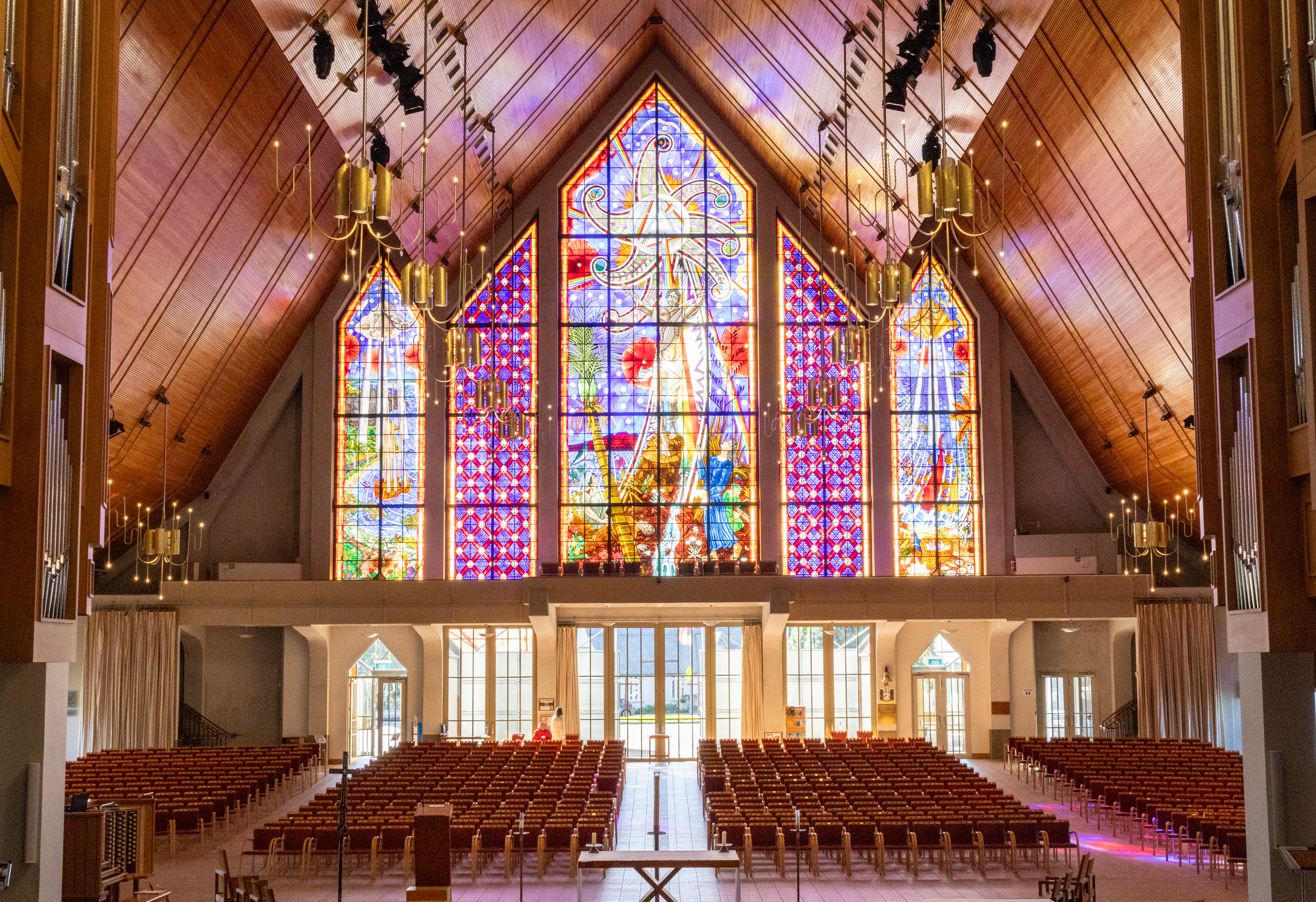
View of the nave and the Great Window

The nave of the new cathedral dedicated to "The Holy Trinity" was designed by Professor Richard Toy, a New Zealand architect. The church was being built around 1962.

Toy designed a modern nave while retaining the ambience and architectural values of the older chancel. He combined two very different architectural styles, incorporating the existing brick & reinforced concrete neo-Gothic chancel, with the new nave, a contemporary design which has large areas of glass and a timber ceiling. The line of the nave roof reflects that of St Mary's Church which stands beside it.

The nave is square in plan enabling the space to be used not only as a place of worship but also as a site for local community functions. Instead of pilers or other exterior supports, the roof is supported via a ridge and furrow roof system, which was invented by architect Joseph Paxton for his Crystal Palace in 1852. The large space and acoustics of the nave allow it to be multi-purpose, with it being used for concerts and other performances.

A third area of worship – the Marsden Chapel named after Samuel Marsden, separated from the body of the cathedral by glass doors and panels – provides an intimate space for private devotions. The inspiration for this small chapel was the small medieval churches of Europe. The decoration in this part of the cathedral is very simple in direct contrast to the rest of the building. A set of five stained glass windows designed by prominent English artist John Baker fit perfectly into the chapel.

The supervising architect for the building of the nave was John Sinclair, former president of the New Zealand Institute of Architects, who also designed the Monteith Visitors' Centre which is attached to the north-east corner of the cathedral and forms an eastern boundary to the cathedral forecourt.

The cathedral can accommodate 1250 people, the nave having a maximum seating capacity of 1100. The church is maintained by the Diocese of Auckland and parishioners. They are assisted by the Friends of Holy Trinity Cathedral Parnell, an organisation particularly involved in the maintenance and beautification of the cathedral's fabric. The organisation was established in 1986.

At a service on 28 October 2017 the cathedral was consecrated by Bishop Ross Bay. The service was attended by bishops of New Zealand, Aotearoa, Australia, Melanesia, Polynesia and Lichfield and a congregation of around 1400.

==== Mountain Fountain sculpture ====
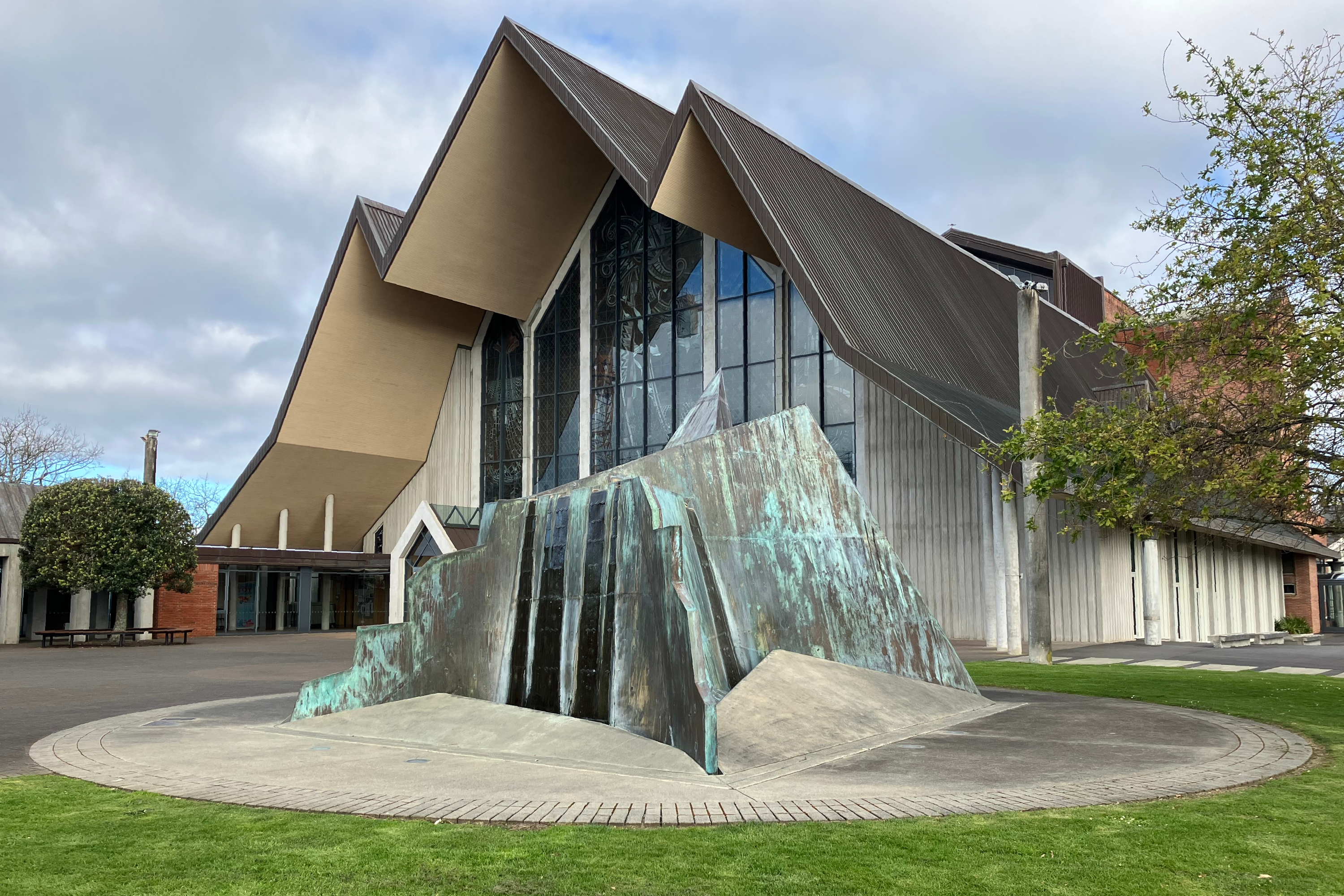
Mountain Fountain in the forecourt of Holy Trinity Cathedral

In 2010, the Terry Stringer sculpture Mountain Fountain was relocated from storage to the forecourt of the Holy Trinity Cathedral. It had previously been located in Aotea Square from its completion in 1981 until its decommission in 2008 during renovations to Aotea Square. Holy Trinity Cathedral council member John Wilson suggested the new site, and it was chosen after consultation with Stringer, the public, and council art advisors. The sculpture fulfilled Professor Toy's original vision to have an artwork situated next to the cathedral. Mountain Fountain was dedicated in its new location on 12 September 2010.

==== Bishop Selwyn Chapel ====
The Bishop Selwyn Chapel was designed in 2017 by the Fearon Hay Architects. The chapel was nominated for the religious section of the World Architecture Festival in Berlin. At the back of the cathedral property it serves as a church for the un-choral eucharists.

==== Deans of Holy Trinity ====
- 2017–present: Anne Mills (previously Vicar of Saint Mark's, Remuera) (installed 6 July 2017)
- 2010–2017: Jo Kelly-Moore (afterwards Archdeacon of Canterbury and then installed as Dean of St Alban's Cathedral Dec 2021 "Jo Kelly-Moore installed as Dean of St Albans". St Albans Cathedral. 4 December 2021. Archived from the original on 13 December 2021.)
- 2007–2010: Ross Graham Bay (afterwards Bishop of Auckland)
- 2000–2007: John Richard Randerson (afterwards Assistant Bishop of the Anglican Diocese of Auckland, 2002)
- 1997–2000: Michael O'Connor
- 1991–1997: Geoff Hickman
- 1970–1991: John Oliver Rymer
- 1949–1969: George Rae Monteith (later Vicar-General and Assistant Bishop of Auckland)
- 1946–1948: Sydney Gethin Caulton (afterwards Bishop of Melanesia, 1948)

== Gallery ==
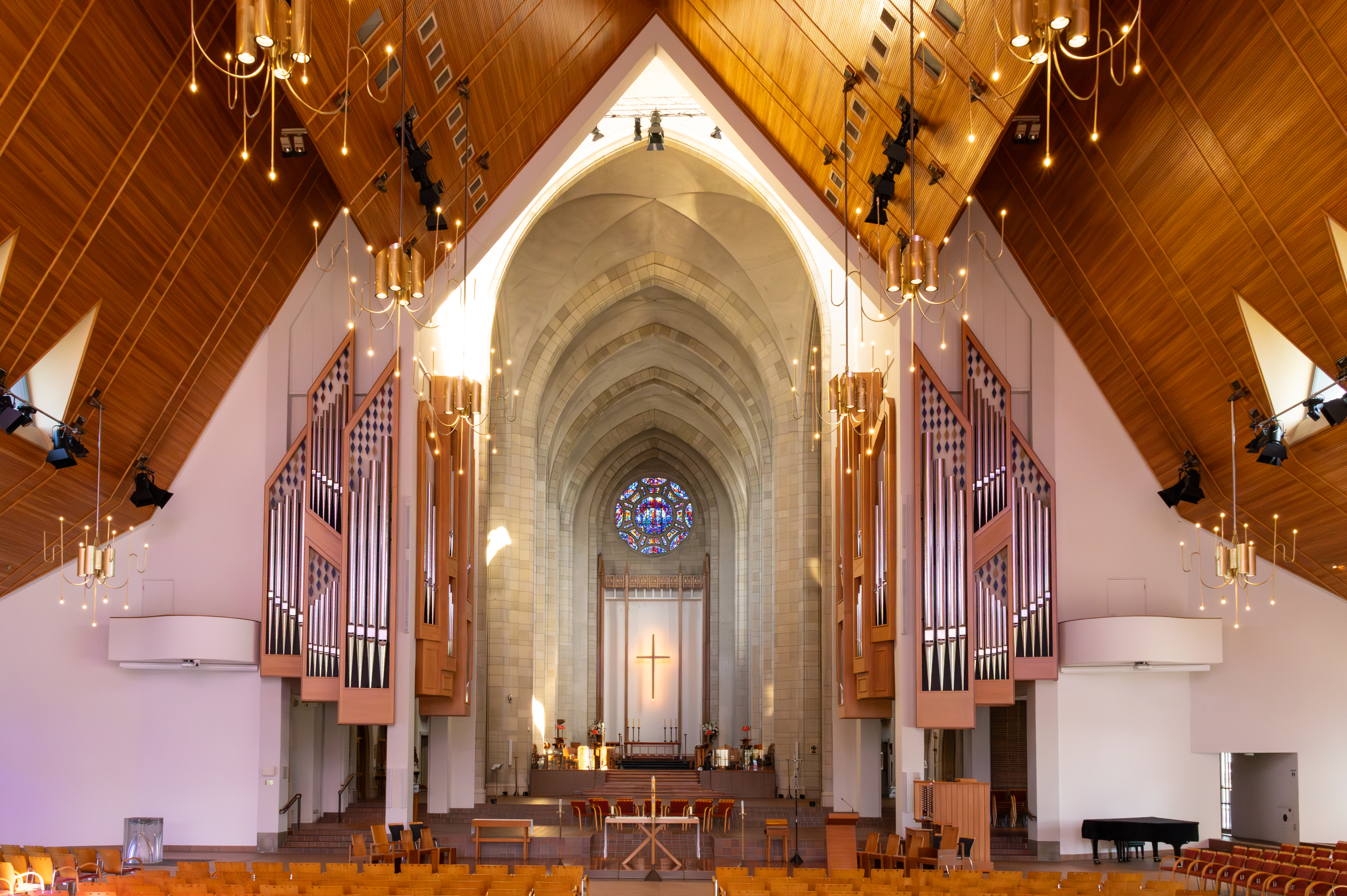
Chancel viewed from the nave

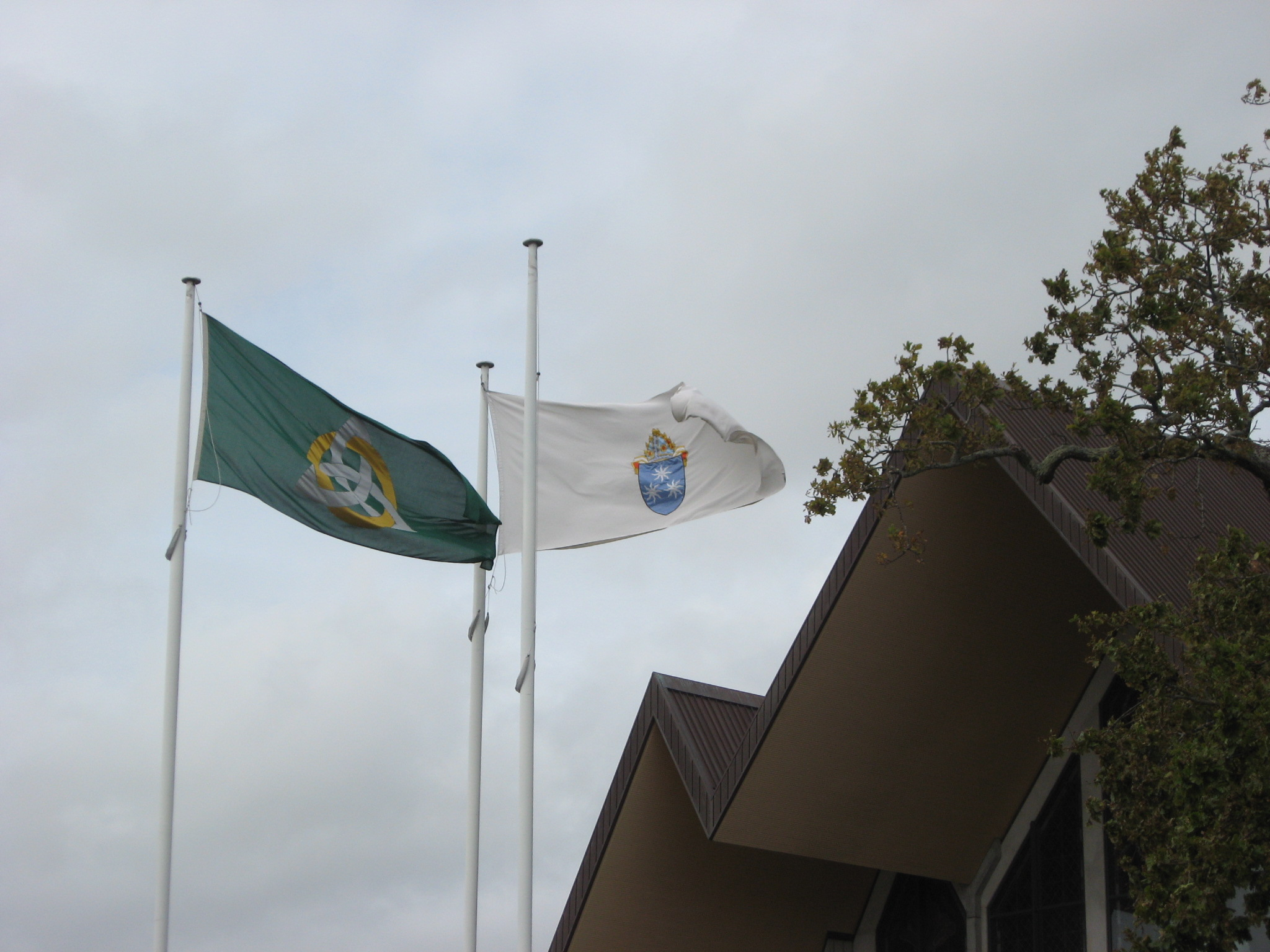
Flags of Holy Trinity Cathedral and the Diocese of Auckland, with the west window of the cathedral

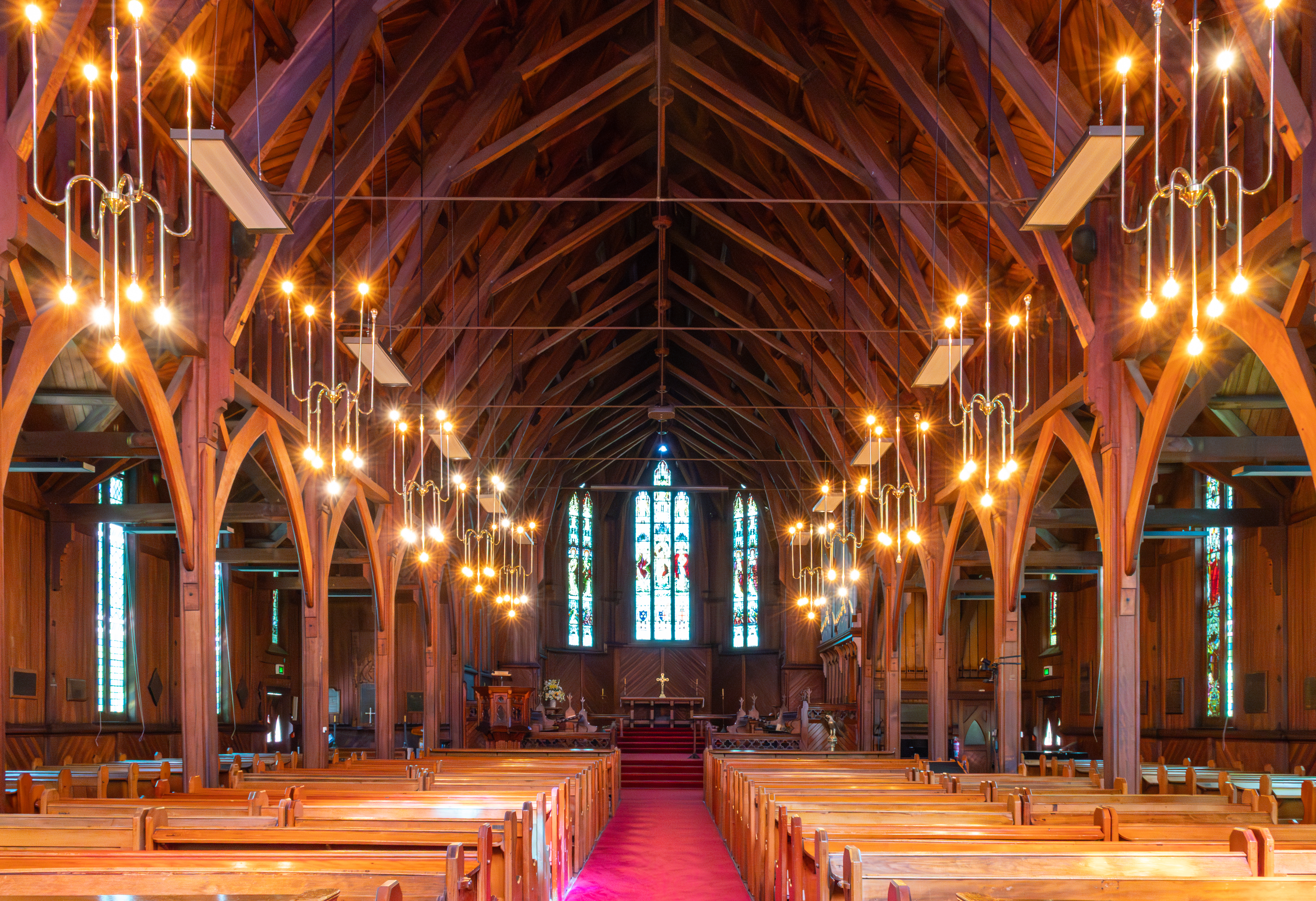
The interior of St Mary's Cathedral, Auckland

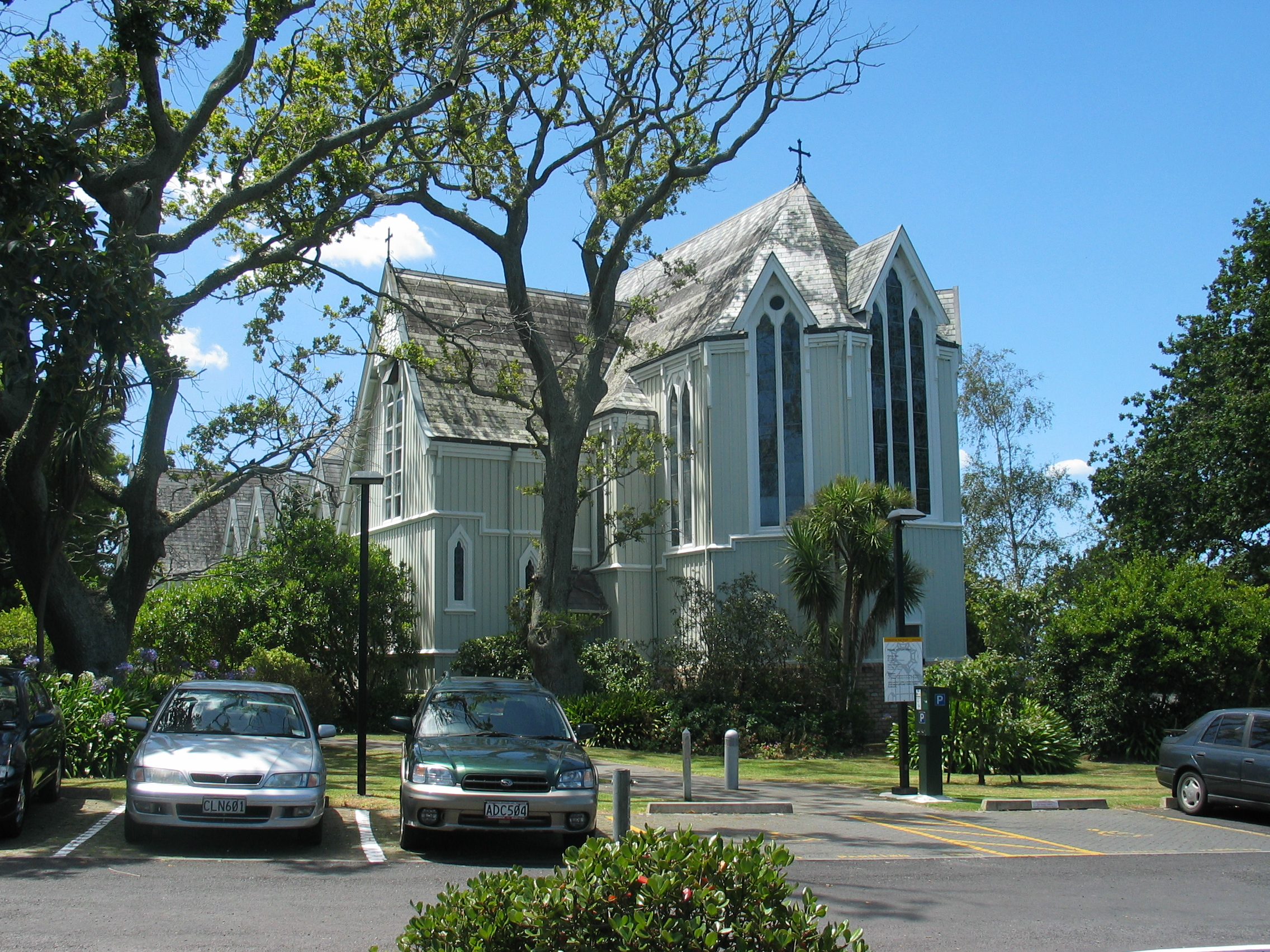
The wooden three-sided altar tribune of St Mary's Cathedral, Auckland is reminiscent of a Romanesque European cathedral

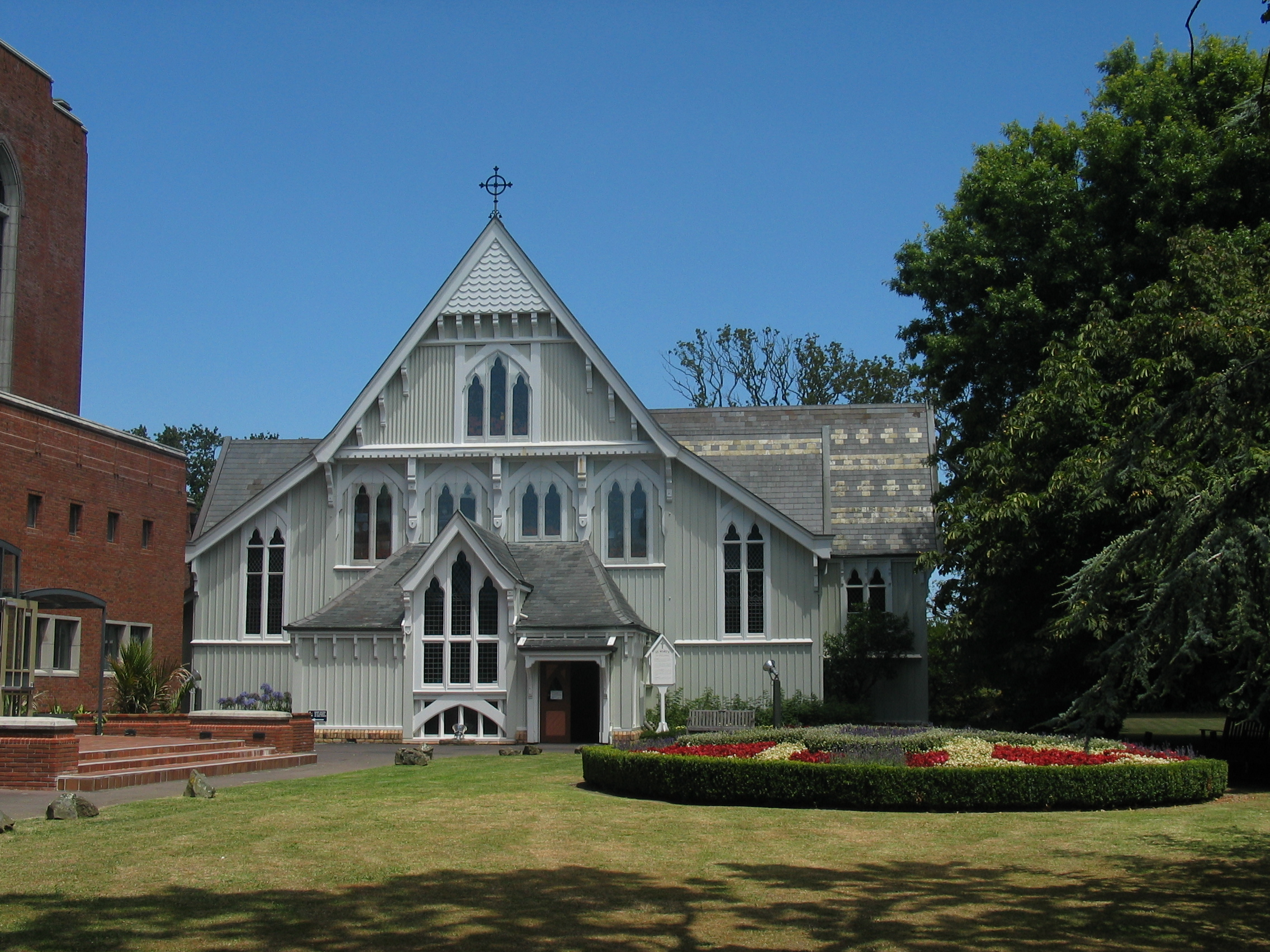
The modern cathedral complex includes Mountfort's earlier wooden cathedral of 1886. The terminating gables served as an inspiration to the façade of the cathedral nave
