= Gilberd =

Gilberd is a surname. Notable people with the surname include:

- William Gilbert (physician) (1544?–1603), English physician, physicist, and natural philosopher
- Bruce Gilberd (1938–2023), New Zealand Anglican bishop

== See also ==
- The Gilberd School
