= John Paterson (bishop of Auckland) =

New Zealand bishop

John Campbell Paterson (born 4 January 1945) was the Anglican Bishop of Auckland from 1994 to 2010.

Paterson was educated at King's College, Auckland and the University of Auckland His qualifications are a Bachelor of Arts degree from the University of Auckland, a Licentiate in Theology from St John's College, Auckland and a Diploma of Public Speaking from the New Zealand Speech Board. He is married to Marion Paterson.

Paterson began his ordained ministry with a curacy at Whangārei. He was then the vicar of Waimate from 1971 to 1976 where he also had chaplaincy and administrative posts before being ordained to the episcopate as the Bishop of Auckland on 24 February 1995; he served in that role until 2010, and as Primate of New Zealand, 1998–2004. He was also the chairman of the Anglican Consultative Council until 2009. On his retirement he was presented with the Cross of St Augustine by the Archbishop of Canterbury. He has been He Pīhopa Āwhina (an honorary assistant bishop) in Te Tai Tokerau since 2010 and called "archbishop emeritus" since 2015.

Anglican Communion titles
Preceded by Bruce Gilberd	Bishop of Auckland; 1994-2010	Succeeded by Ross Bay
Preceded by Simon Chiwanga	Chair of the Anglican Consultative Council; 2002–2009	Succeeded by James Tengatenga
