= John Simkin =

New Zealand bishop

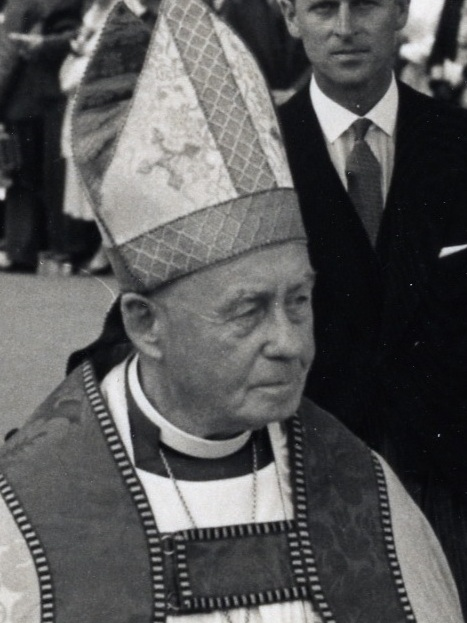
Simkin in 1953

Wilfred John Simkin CMG (15 June 1883 – 8 July 1967) was the 6th Anglican Bishop of Auckland whose episcopate spanned a 20-year period during the middle of the 20th century. Born in Staffordshire he was educated at St. Oswald's School, (later Ellesmere College, Ellesmere, Shropshire) and Lichfield Theological College before embarking on an ecclesiastical career with a curacy at Christ Church, Stafford. Emigrating to New Zealand in 1911 he was successively Vicar of Wairoa, Private Chaplain to the Bishop of Waiapu and Archdeacon of Hawkes Bay/Manukau before appointment to the See of Auckland in 1940. He was consecrated bishop on 11 June 1940. An enigmatic man, he worked tirelessly to complete the building of Holy Trinity Cathedral.

In 1953, Simkin was awarded the Queen Elizabeth II Coronation Medal. In the 1965 Queen's Birthday Honours, he was appointed a Companion of the Order of St Michael and St George, for services to the community.

Anglican Communion titles
Preceded by Alfred Walter Averill	Bishop of Auckland, NZ; 1940–1960	Succeeded by Eric Austin Gowing
