= Eric Gowing =

VII Anglican Bishop of Auckland

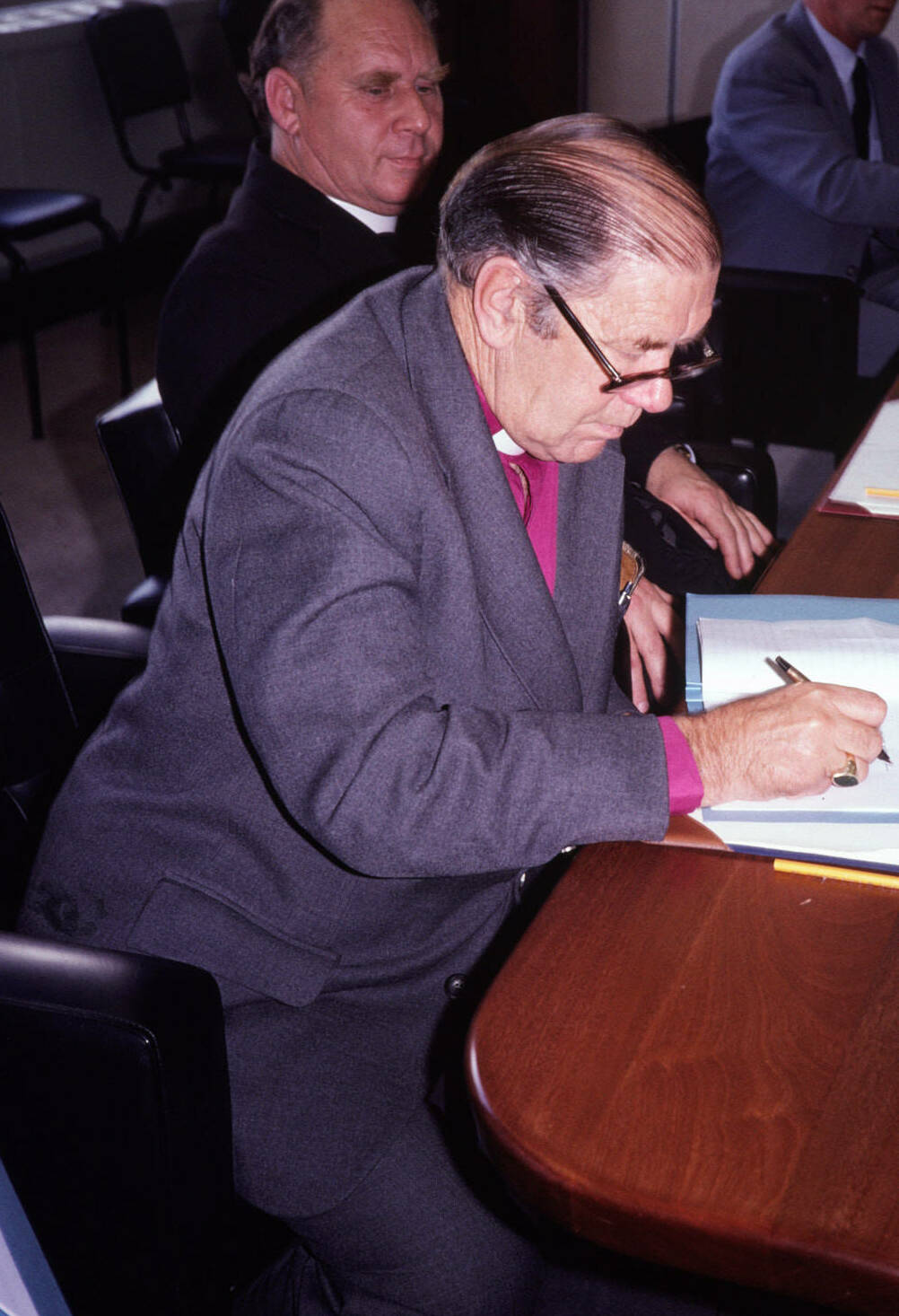
Gowing in 1977, at a meeting of the Waikumete Chapel Restoration Trust

Eric Austin Gowing (11 March 1913 - 3 June 1981) was the seventh Anglican Bishop of Auckland. His episcopate spanned a long period during the second half of the 20th century.

Born in Sydney, Australia, Gowing was educated at North Sydney High School and the universities of Sydney and Oxford, before beginning his ordained ministry as a curate at St Mary's Deane Stafford. After an incumbency at St Peter's Norbiton, he emigrated to New Zealand in 1950 where he was Vicar of Merivale and Archdeacon of Christchurch before his appointment to the episcopal see of Auckland in 1960; he was consecrated a bishop on 1 November 1960. He was one of the last bishops to wear the traditional frock coat, hose and gaiters. He served as a vice-president of the New Zealand Homosexual Law Reform Society and as a patron of the Society for Promotion of Community Standards.

Gowing was the son-in-law of Thomas Sherwood Jones, a Bishop of Hulme, who in 1961 travelled from England (at the age of 89) to assist in Gowing's consecration.

Religious titles
Preceded by William John Simkin	Bishop of Auckland, NZ; 1960–1978	Succeeded by Paul Reeves
