= Anglican Diocese of Auckland =

Anglican Church diocese in New Zealand

Diocese of Auckland
- Arms of the Diocese of Auckland

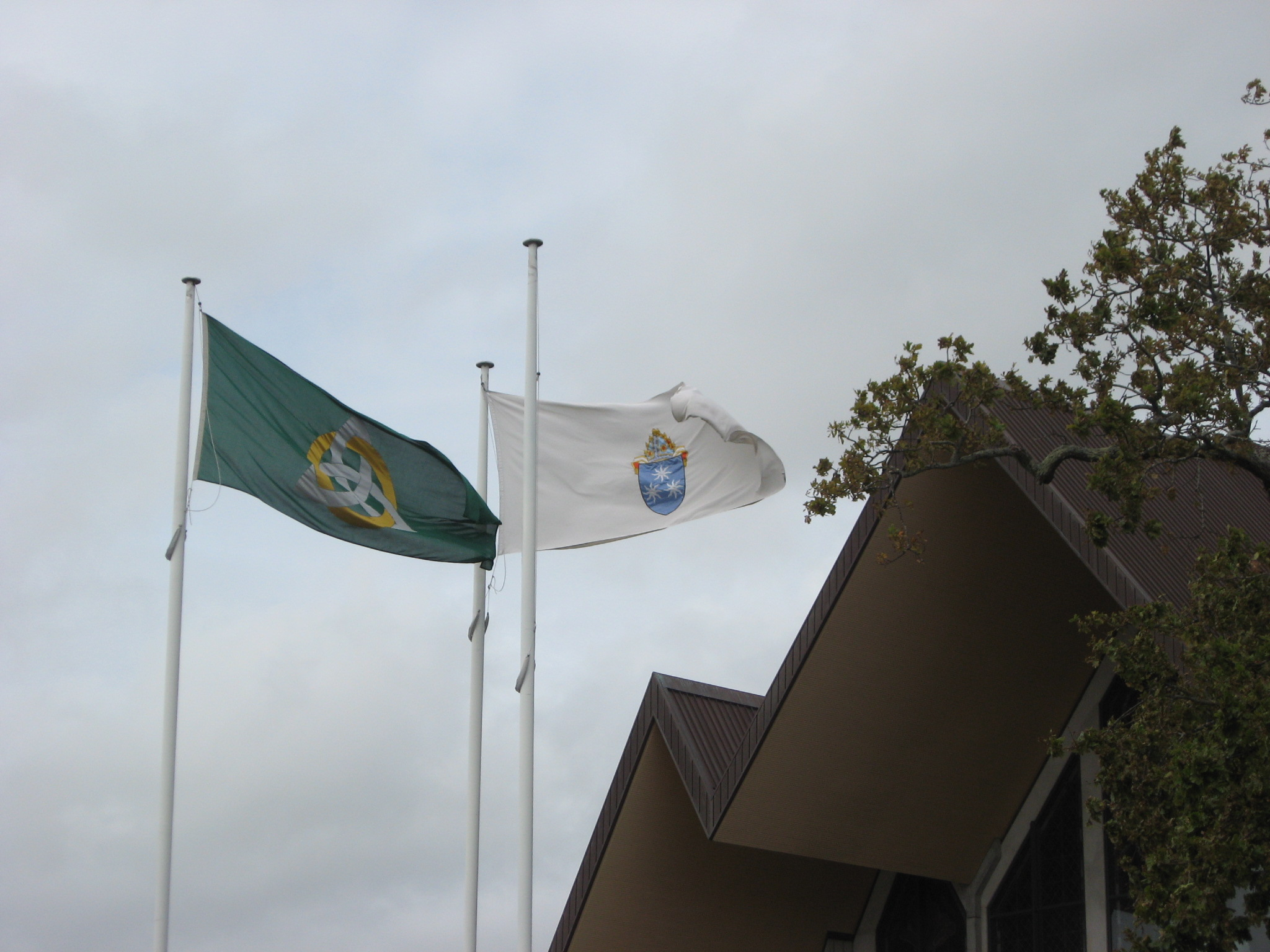
- Flag
- Incumbent; Ross Bay QSM OStJ
- Style: The Right Reverend

Location
- Country: New Zealand
- Territory: North Island
- Ecclesiastical province: Aotearoa, New Zealand and Polynesia
- Headquarters: Auckland
- Coordinates: 36°51′30″S 174°47′03″E

Statistics
- Area: 24,033 km^{2} (9,279 sq mi)
- Population: Total: 1,758,276
- Members: 65,562 (3.73%)

Information
- First holder: George Selwyn (as Bishop of New Zealand)
- Formation: 1841
- Denomination: Anglican
- Cathedral: Holy Trinity Cathedral

Current leadership
- Parent church: Anglican Communion
- Bishop: Ross Bay QSM OStJ
- Vicar General: Carole Hughes
- Archdeacons: Carole Hughes; Michael Berry; Jonathan Gale

Website
- www.aucklandanglican.org.nz

The Diocese of Auckland is one of the thirteen dioceses and hui amorangi (Māori bishoprics) of the Anglican Church in Aotearoa, New Zealand and Polynesia. The Diocese covers the area stretching from North Cape down to the Waikato River, across the Hauraki Plains and including the Coromandel Peninsula.

The current bishop is Ross Bay QSM OStJ, who was enthroned as the 11th Bishop of Auckland at the Cathedral of the Holy Trinity on Saturday, 17 April 2010.

The theological college is the College of St John the Evangelist.

== History ==
The Diocese of New Zealand was established in 1841, and originally covered the entire country. In 1842, its jurisdiction was described as simply "New Zealand". In 1854, it was limited to the Auckland region only. By act of the fourth General Synod (anticipating Selwyn's retirement), 15 October 1868 the diocese was renamed the Diocese of Auckland; Selwyn was called Bishop of New Zealand until his resignation of the See in 1869, whereas Cowie was called Bishop of Auckland from the announcement of his nomination.

== List of bishops ==
The following individuals have served as the Bishop of Auckland, or any precursor title:

Ordinal	Officeholder	Term start	Term end	Notes
1	George Selwyn (Bishop of New Zealand)	1841	1869	Sole bishop in New Zealand until 1856; metropolitan/primate thereafter; translated to Lichfield (but retained See of New Zealand until May 1869)
Bishops of Auckland
2	William Cowie	1869	1902	Also Primate from 1869; died in office.
3	Moore Neligan	1903	1910	
4	Lloyd Crossley	1911	1913	
5	Alfred Averill	1914	1940	Translated from Waiapu; also Archbishop of New Zealand from 1925.
6	John Simkin	1940	1960	
7	Eric Gowing	1960	1978	
8	Paul Reeves	1979	1985	Translated from Waiapu; also Archbishop of New Zealand from 1980; afterwards Governor-General of New Zealand.
9	Bruce Gilberd	1985	1994	
10	John Paterson	1994	2010	Also Presiding Bishop of New Zealand from 1998.
11	Ross Bay	17 April 2010	incumbent	

=== Assistant bishops ===
The following individuals have served as an Assistant Bishop of Auckland, or any precursor title:

- Gething Caulton, Vicar of Northcote and then Epsom, former Bishop of Melanesia, Assistant Bishop, 1955–1964.
- Monty Monteith, an Assistant Bishop from his consecration, 24 February 1965, until his death, 12 June 2003.
- Ted Buckle, an Assistant Bishop for the Northern Region, 1981 – 30 June 1992;
- Bruce Moore, an Assistant Bishop in 1980 and retired on 30 November 1991
- Jim White, as Assistant Bishop with his consecration as a bishop on 29 October 2011

== Archdeaconries ==
The Diocese of Auckland has three archdeaconries: Carole Hughes is an Archdeacon of the Central Region, Michael Berry is an Archdeacon of the Southern Region and Jonathan Gale is an Archdeacon of the Northern Region.

== Archdeacon of Auckland ==
- 1870-1883:Ven Robert Maunsell
- 1883: Ven Edward B. Clarke
- 1901-1915: Ven William Calder
- 1915-1919: Ven George MacMurray
- 1956-1963: Ven Albert Prebble
- 1963-1971: Ven Lionel Beere
- 1971-1981: Ven Edward Buckle

== Archdeacon of Waitemata ==
- 1853-1858: Ven Charles Abraham (Later First Bishop of Wellington)
- 1858: Ven George Kissling
- 1868: Ven Robert Maunsell
- 1940-1954: Ven Percy Houghton
- 1954-1961: Ven Norman Winhall
- 1961-1963: Ven Lionel Beere
- 1963-1965: Ven Alfred Anderson
- 1965-1972: Ven Harold Steele
- 1972-1978: Ven Francis Thomas
- 1980-1987: Ven John Brokenshire

== Archdeacon of Manakau ==
- 1956-1965: Ven Maxwell Bull
- 1965-1973: Ven Alfred Anderson

== Archdeacons of Te Waimate 1844-1970 ==
- Ven H. Williams 1844-1867
- Ven E. B. Clarke 1870-1901
- Ven P. Walsh 1901-1912
- Ven H. A. Hawkins 1912-1939
- Ven H. T. Steele 1939-1942
- Ven A. E. Prebble 1942-1949
- Ven A. H. Johnston 1949-1953
- Ven C. G. Palmer 1953-1957
- Ven P. Tipene 1957-1962
- Ven P. E. Sutton 1962-1963
- Ven G. A. Butt 1964-1969
- Ven H. G. Bowyer 1969-1976

== See also ==
- King's College, Auckland
