= John Rymer =

- Born: 13 August 1924; Townsville, Queensland, Australia
- Died: 7 April 2003 (aged 78); Auckland, New Zealand

John Oliver Rymer (13 August 1924 – 7 April 2003) was the Dean of Auckland from 1970 until 1991.

Rymer was educated at the University of Queensland and ordained in 1948. His first posts were curacies at St Peter's Cathedral Armidale and St Paul's Cathedral, Rockhampton. Headington. He was Vicar of Biloela from 1951 to 1954 after which he was the Chaplain of the University of New England.

In 1982, Rymer became the chairman of the Christ of the Ships Trust Board, a non-denominational group who intended to fund the construction of a 12 m (39 ft) statue of Jesus to be constructed in the Waitematā Harbour.

Dean Rymer served as Padre of the Auckland Division of the RNZNVR from 1985 to 1993.
