= Ross Bay =

New Zealand bishop

The Right Reverend Ross Bay QSM OStJ
- Bishop of Auckland
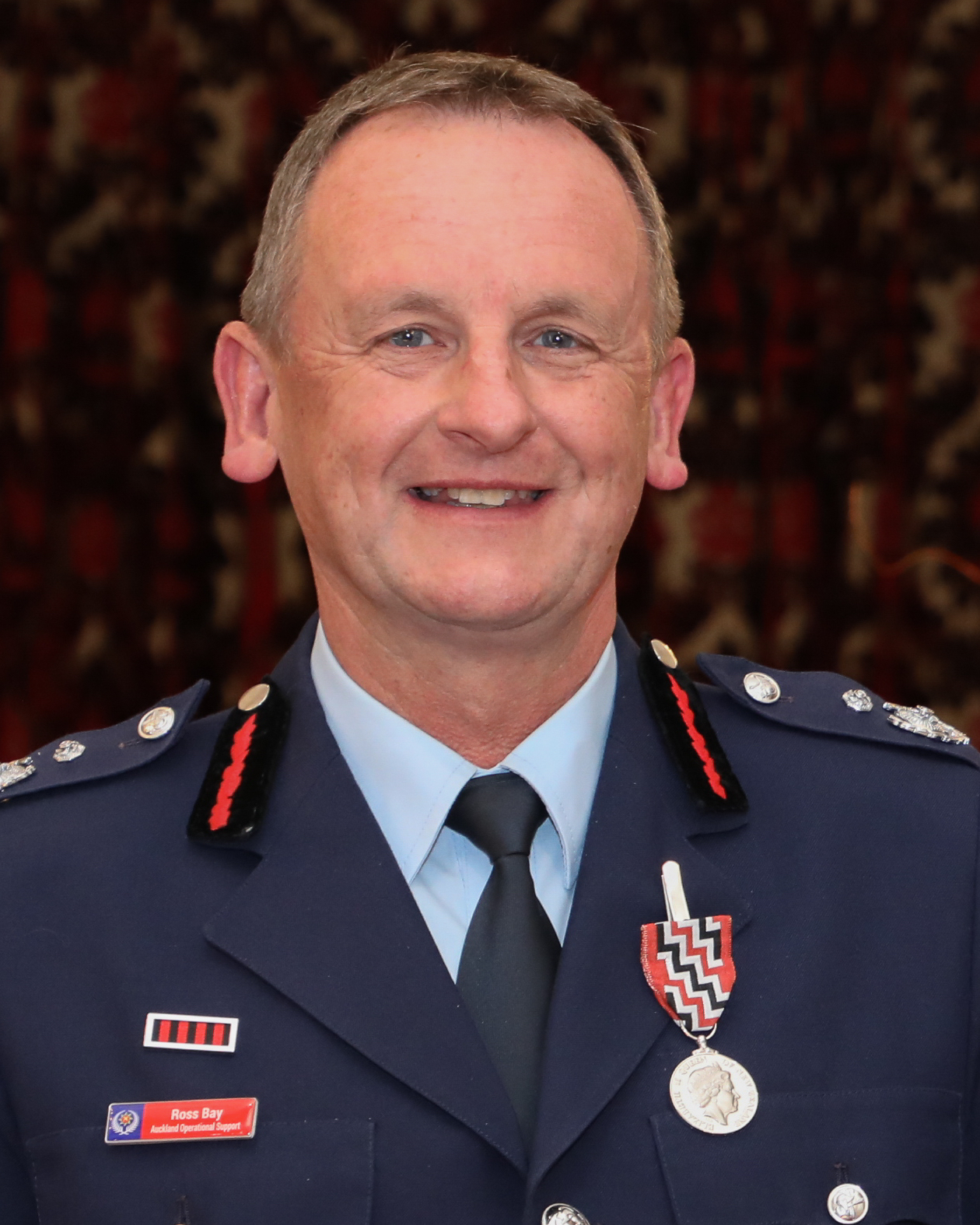
- Bay in 2022
- Church: Anglican Church in Aotearoa, New Zealand and Polynesia

Orders
- Ordination: 1989 (deacon); 1989 (priest)
- Consecration: 17 April 2010

Personal details
- Born: Ross Graham Bay; 1965 (age 60–61)
- Denomination: Anglican
- Residence: Auckland, New Zealand
- Spouse: Jacquie Bay
- Education: Bible College of New Zealand; Australian College of Theology; London University

Ross Graham Bay OStJ QSM (born 1965) has been the 11th Bishop of Auckland in the Anglican Church in Aotearoa, New Zealand and Polynesia since 17 April 2010.

== Biography ==
Bay was born in Auckland and educated in Papatoetoe, before studying theology at the Bible College of New Zealand and St John's College, Auckland. He was ordained in 1989 and began his ministry with curacies in Kohimarama and Holy Trinity Cathedral, Auckland. Later he was priest assistant at St Matthew's, Auckland, and then vicar of Ellerslie. He became the vicar of St Mark's Remuera in 2001 and was appointed Archdeacon of Auckland in 2006.

Bay's last post before being ordained to the episcopate, at age 45, was as the 8th Dean of Holy Trinity Cathedral from 2007 to 2010. While Dean of Holy Trinity, he officiated the funeral of Sir Edmund Hillary on 22 January 2008.

Bay currently serves on the board of governors for private secondary schools King's College and Diocesan School for Girls which both have strong links to the Anglican church. Other governance roles include Chairman of the Diocesan Council, Chairman of Trustee of King's College, Trustee of the General Trust Board, General Church Trust Board, Auckland City Mission and president of the Selwyn Foundation. Bay is a volunteer officer in the Auckland Operational Support Unit of Fire and Emergency New Zealand.

== Honours and awards ==
In 2020, Bay was appointed an Officer of the Order of St John. In the 2022 Queen's Birthday and Platinum Jubilee Honours, he was awarded the Queen's Service Medal, for services to Fire and Emergency New Zealand and the community.

Religious titles
Preceded by John Paterson	Bishop of Auckland; 2010– present	Incumbent
