= Bruce Gilberd =

New Zealand Anglican bishop (1938–2023)

The Right Reverend Bruce Gilberd CNZM
- Bishop of Auckland
- Installed: 1985
- Term ended: 1994
- Predecessor: Paul Reeves
- Successor: John Paterson

Orders
- Consecration: 7 December 1985

Personal details
- Born: Bruce Carlyle Gilberd; 22 April 1938 Whangārei, New Zealand
- Died: 19 December 2023 (aged 85) Tairua, New Zealand
- Denomination: Anglicanism

Bruce Carlyle Gilberd CNZM (22 April 1938 – 19 December 2023) was a New Zealand Anglican bishop. He was the 8th Bishop of Auckland, from 1985 to 1994.

== Biography ==
Gilberd was born in Whangārei on 22 April 1938. He was educated at King's College, Auckland, and the University of Auckland. His qualifications are BSc (Auckland), LTh, LTh (Hons), STh (St John).

Gilberd began his ordained ministry as a curate at Devonport. As vicar of Avondale from 1968 to 1971, he gained further experience through secondment to Egglescliffe on Teesside in the United Kingdom as an industrial chaplain. On his return, he became director of the Interchurch Trade and Industrial Mission (ITIM) in Wellington. From 1980 to 1985, he was a lecturer at St John's College, Auckland, before being ordained as a bishop on 7 December 1985. A keen fisherman and sailor, Gilberd retired in 1994.

In retirement, Gilberd lived at Tairua, and campaigned against the construction of a new marina there. In the 2002 New Year Honours, Gilberd was appointed a Companion of the New Zealand Order of Merit, for services to the community.

Gilberd died at his home in Tairua on 19 December 2023, at the age of 85.

Religious titles
Preceded by Paul Reeves	Bishop of Auckland; 1985–1994	Succeeded by John Paterson
