= St Barnabas Church, Mount Eden =

Anglican church in Mount Eden, Auckland, New Zealand

St Barnabas Church
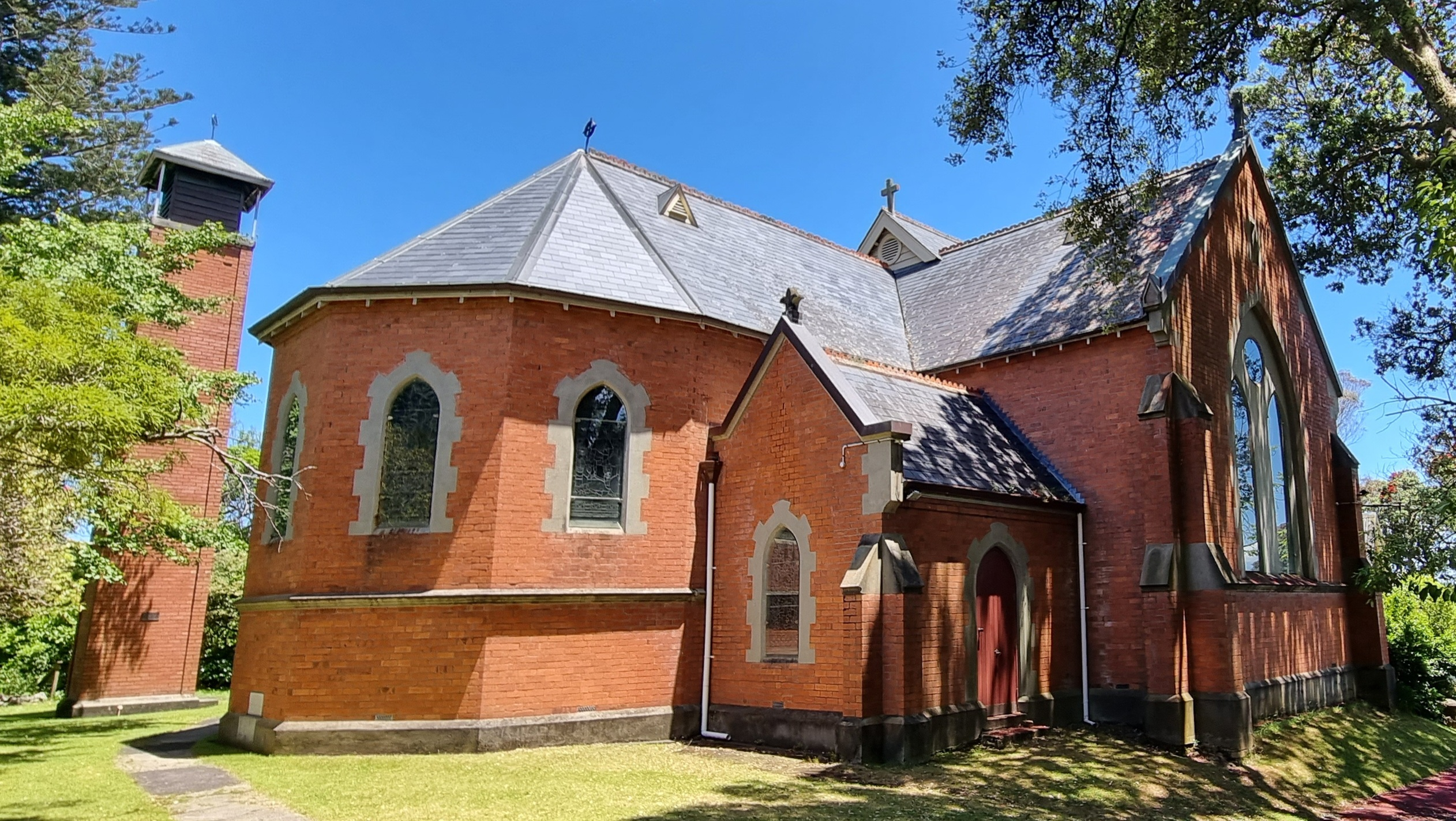
- St Barnabas Church
- 36.87550°S 174.76129°E
- Address: 283 Mt Eden Rd & Bellevue Rd, Mt Eden
- Country: New Zealand
- Denomination: Anglican
- Website: stbarnabas.nz

Heritage New Zealand – Category 2
- Designated: 11 November 1981
- Reference no.: 516

St Barnabas Church is a historic Anglican church in Mount Eden, Auckland, New Zealand. Originally built in 1848 it was later moved to the current site. Subsequent expansions have significantly altered the church to where now the majority is brick with a small wooden nave of the original serving as the nave to it. It is registered as a category 2 building with Heritage New Zealand.

== History ==
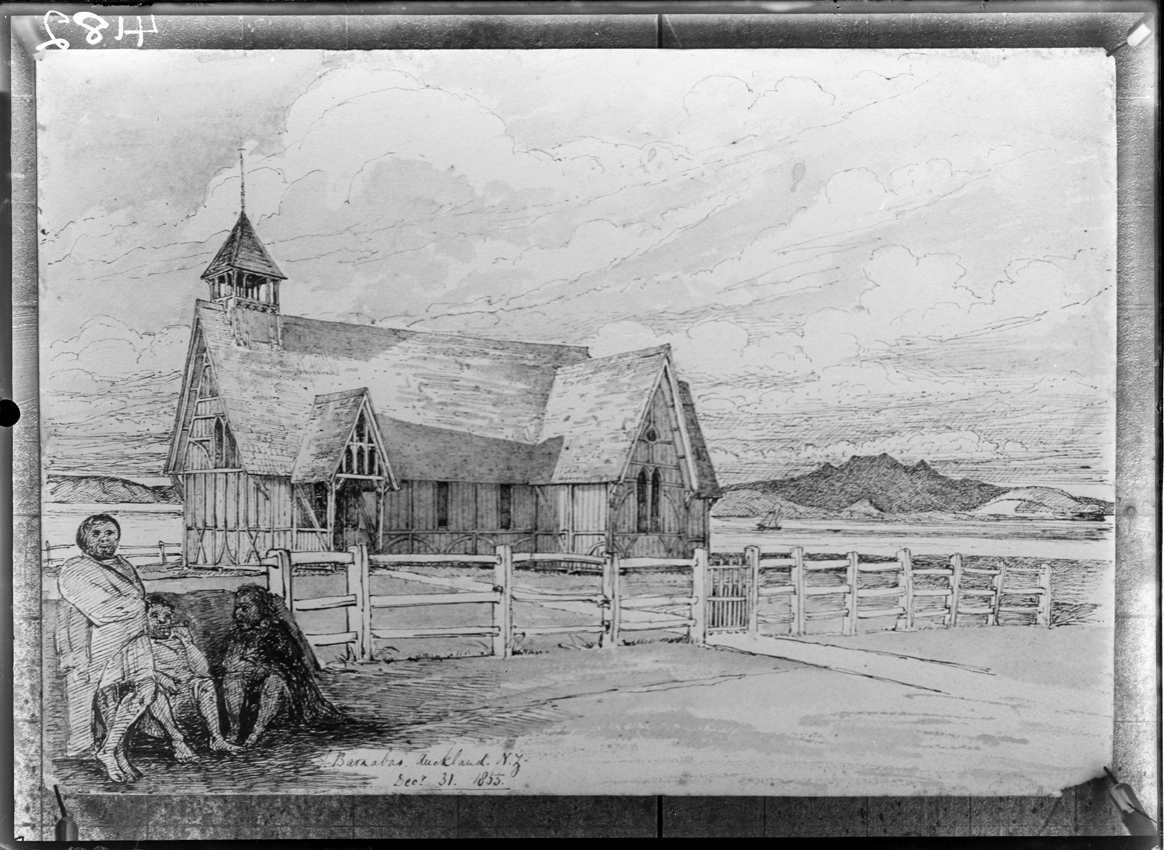
Illustration of St Barnabas Church at Dunlop Point

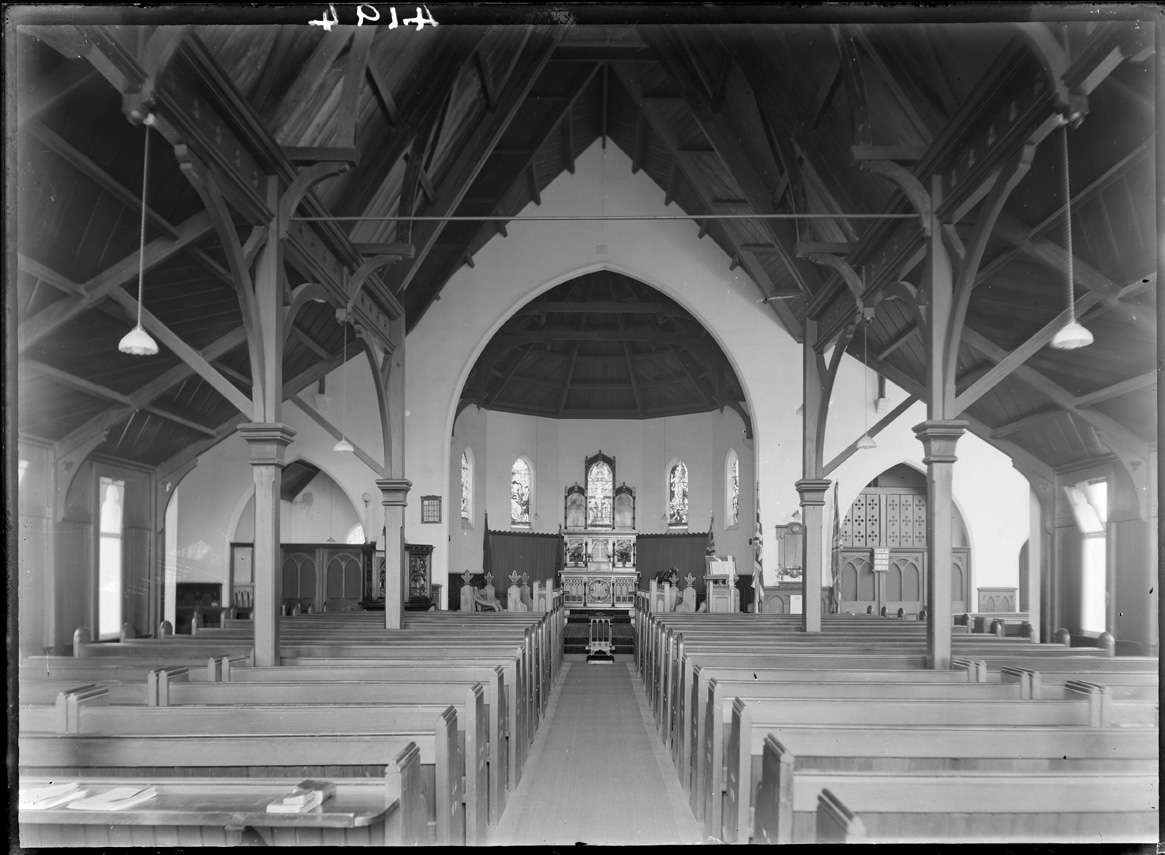
St Barnabas Church Interior, Mount Eden, 1928

St Barnabas' Church was originally constructed in 1848 at Point Dunlop, east of Mechanics Bay. It was designed by Frederick Thatcher as one of the original Selwyn churches. In 1866 the nave was widened to the point of the transepts, it was also lengthened on one side.

In 1877 the church was moved to the current site in Mount Eden. The church was part of the Parish of the Church of the Holy Sepulchre. The first service was held on a Sunday, 6 October 1878. In 1886 the church was enlarged for a growing congregation. In 1897 nearby land was purchased for a Sunday school and vicarage. In 1903 a brick rebuild started, but never completely finished and the nave of the old church remains. In 1932 a vestry was added. The vicarage was sold in 1952. In 1964 a war memorial campanile was erected.
