= Governor-General of New Zealand =

Representative of the monarch

- Te Kāwana Tianara o Aotearoa (Māori)
- Badge

- Flag of the governor-general

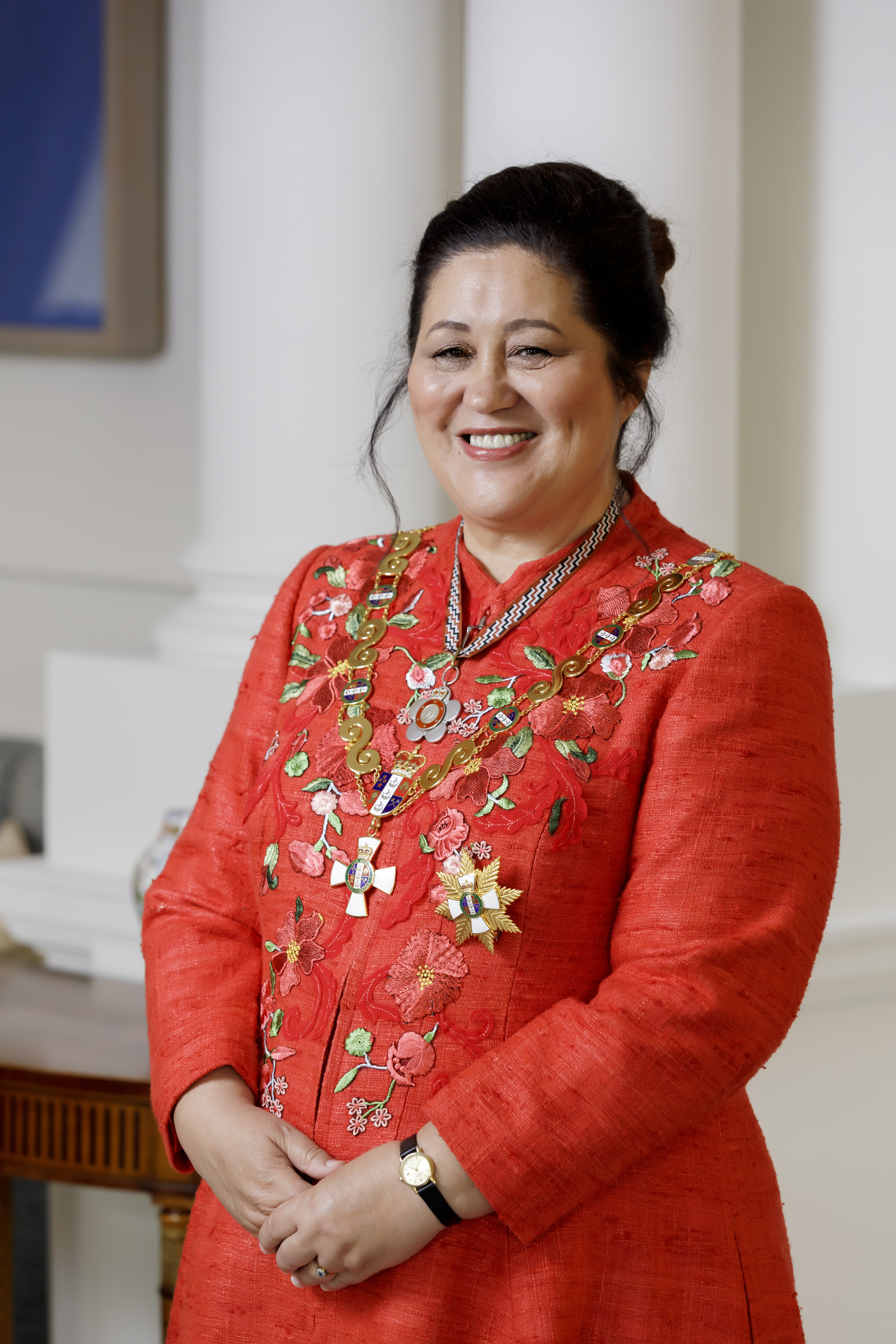
- Incumbent; Cindy Kiro since 21 October 2021
- Viceregal
- Style: Her Excellency; The Right Honourable
- Residence: Government House, Wellington; Government House, Auckland
- Seat: Wellington, New Zealand
- Appointer: Monarch of New Zealand; on the advice of the prime minister
- Term length: At His Majesty's pleasure; (usually 5 years by constitutional convention)
- Constituting instrument: Letters Patent 1983
- Formation: 3 May 1841
- First holder: William Hobson as Governor of New Zealand
- Salary: NZ$458,600 annually
- Website: gg.govt.nz

The governor-general of New Zealand (Note: The New Zealand Government spells the title "governor-general" with a hyphen, unlike the spelling in Canada, for instance. As governor is the noun in the title, it is pluralised as "governors-general", rather than "governor-generals". Both terms are capitalised when used in the formal title preceding an incumbent's name.) (Māori: Te kāwana tianara o Aotearoa) is the representative of the monarch of New Zealand, currently King Charles III. As the King is concurrently the monarch of 14 other Commonwealth realms and lives in the United Kingdom, (Note: The monarch's principal residence is in the UK. The King and other members of his family have occasionally toured New Zealand.) he, on the advice of his New Zealand prime minister, appoints a governor-general to carry out his constitutional and ceremonial duties within New Zealand. The governor-general of New Zealand also serves as governor-general in relation to Niue.

Governors-general typically serve a five-year term of office, subject to a possible short extension, though they formally serve "at the monarch's pleasure". The incumbent governor-general is Dame Cindy Kiro, since 21 October 2021. Administrative support for the governor-general is provided by the Department of the Prime Minister and Cabinet. Constitutional functions include presiding over the Executive Council, appointing ministers and judges, granting royal assent to legislation, and summoning and dissolving parliament. These functions are generally exercised only according to the advice of an elected government. The governor-general also has important ceremonial roles: hosting events at Government House in Wellington, and travelling throughout New Zealand to open conferences, attend services and commemorations, and generally provide encouragement to individuals and groups who are contributing to their communities.

The current office traces its origins to when the administration of New Zealand was placed under the Colony of New South Wales in 1839 and its governor was given jurisdiction over New Zealand. New Zealand would become its own colony the next year with its own governor. The modern title and functions of the "governor-general" came into being in 1917, and the office is currently mandated by Letters Patent issued in 1983, constituting "the Governor-General and Commander-in-Chief of the Realm of New Zealand". The governor initially represented the British monarch and the British government. Therefore, many past officeholders were from the United Kingdom, including a succession of minor aristocrats from the 1890s onwards. In a gradual process, especially with the adoption of the Statute of Westminster in 1947, the governor-general has become the independent, personal representative of the New Zealand monarch. In 1972, Sir Denis Blundell became the first New Zealand resident to be appointed to the office. When travelling abroad, particularly more frequently since the late 20th century, the governor-general is seen as the national representative of New Zealand; for this reason, the governor-general has been described by academics and politicians as the de facto head of state, though the Constitution Act 1986 explicitly identifies the monarch as New Zealand's head of state.

== Appointment ==
The monarch of New Zealand appoints the governor-general on the sole recommendation of the prime minister of New Zealand, by commission issued under the Seal of New Zealand, known as the "Terms of Appointment".

Constitutional convention adopted in 1930, following the Imperial Conference held that year, allowed for the appointment of the governor-general to be made upon the advice of the New Zealand Government, though that right was not exercised directly by a New Zealand prime minister until 1967, with the appointment of the first New Zealand-born governor-general, Sir Arthur Porritt on the advice of Keith Holyoake. The next governor-general, Sir Denis Blundell, was the first New Zealand born and resident governor-general. Today, the Terms of Appointment are counter-signed by the prime minister, to signify that the prime minister is responsible for advising the sovereign on the appointment.

The prime minister's advice has sometimes been the result of a decision by Cabinet; there is no requirement for this, and there have been a number of instances where the governor-general was appointed with no consultation of Cabinet. Since 1980, the Department of the Prime Minister and Cabinet prepares a short list of candidates for the office. By convention, the leader of the Opposition is consulted on the appointment; this has not always been the case.

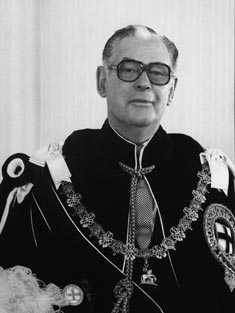
Keith Holyoake, a former prime minister, was a controversial choice as governor-general.

On only one occasion has the prime minister's choice of appointee aroused public anger or complaint, and that controversy was short-lived. In 1977, Sir Keith Holyoake, a former National Party prime minister and a serving minister of state, was controversially appointed as governor-general. The Leader of the Opposition, Bill Rowling, complained he had not been consulted by Prime Minister Robert Muldoon on the appointment of Holyoake, and openly suggested that he would have recommended Sir Edmund Hillary instead. (Rowling's remark was in turn criticised by the Government, as Hillary had backed the opposition Labour Party in 1975 as part of the "Citizens for Rowling" campaign.) It was suggested by many commentators that it would be inappropriate to entrust the office to a former party leader or anyone who is closely allied with a political party; despite his background, Holyoake could not be said to have discharged his duties in a partisan way, and he stayed in office for only three years. Since Holyoake's appointment, the prime minister is now meant to consult with the leader of the opposition during the nomination process, to avoid partisan controversy, and informally seek approval for the appointment from the monarch. The decision is then kept confidential until both the New Zealand Government and Buckingham Palace (the royal household) announce the appointment simultaneously.

Beginning with the appointment of Sir David Beattie in 1980, lawyers and judges have predominated as governors-general. Following the introduction of MMP in 1996, it has been determined that an understanding of constitutional law is an important prerequisite for candidacy to the office. The first governor-general to preside over a MMP general election was Sir Michael Hardie Boys, a retired high court judge. Hardie Boys was appointed in 1995 on the advice of then prime minister Jim Bolger, following notification of all leaders of parties then represented in parliament, to ensure broad cross-party support. Following Hardie Boys' appointment other party leaders are only notified very shortly before the announcement is made, if at all.

There has been on-and-off speculation that a member of the royal family might take up the position. In 2004, National MP Richard Worth, an avowed monarchist, asked Prime Minister Helen Clark whether she had considered nominating the Queen's son, Prince Edward, Earl of Wessex, to be the next governor-general.

=== Swearing-in ceremony ===
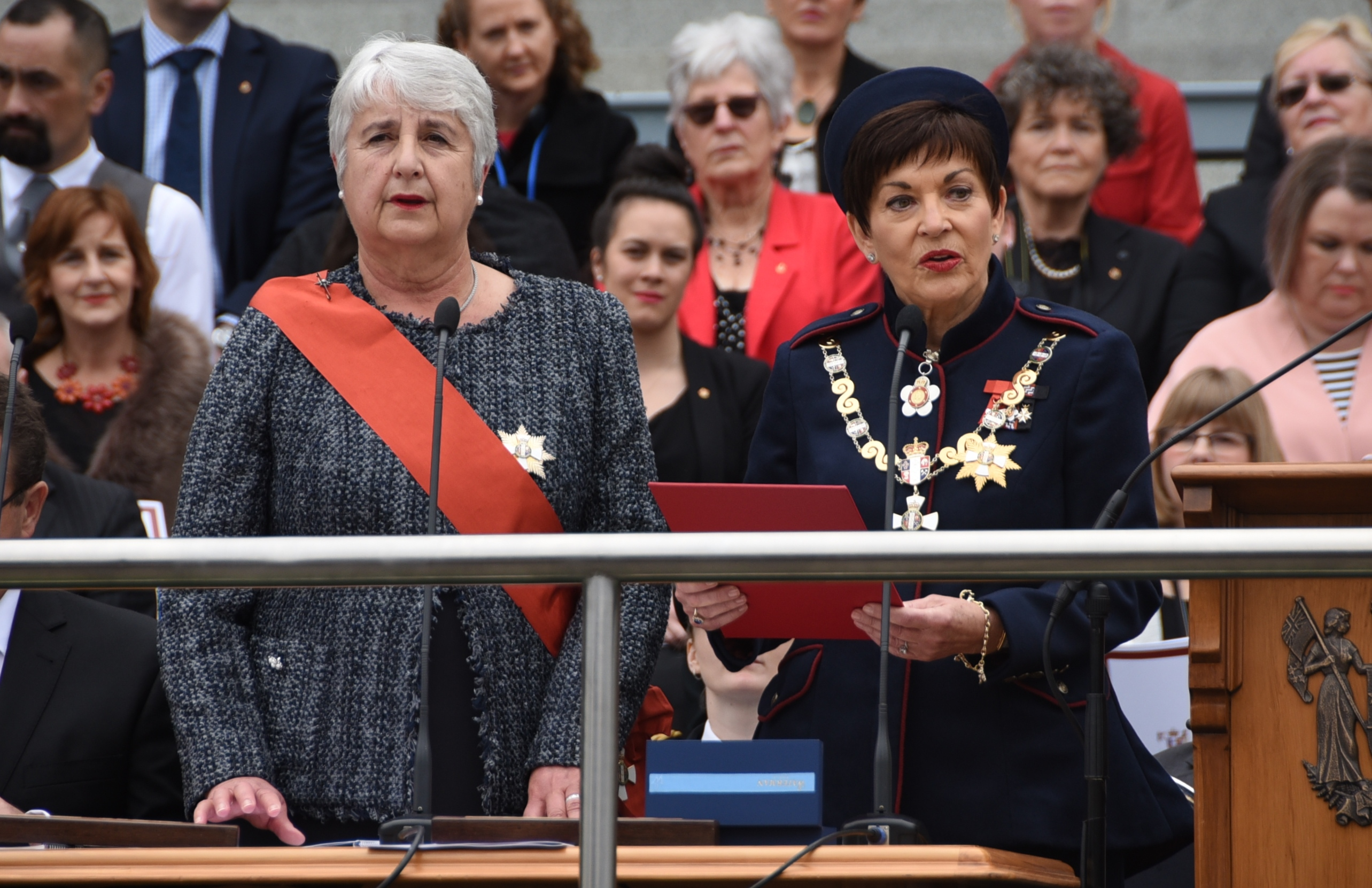
Governor-General Dame Patsy Reddy (right) takes the affirmation after being sworn in by Chief Justice Dame Sian Elias on 28 September 2016

The commission of appointment is publicly read in the presence of the chief justice and the members of the Executive Council before the governor-general enters office. The chief justice or other High Court judge then administers the Oath (or Affirmation) of Allegiance, and the Oath (or Affirmation) of Office to the governor-general.

=== Election proposals ===
From time to time, there have been proposals to elect the governor-general. When first drafted by then Governor George Grey, the New Zealand Constitution Act 1852 contained a provision for the governor to be elected by New Zealand's parliament. This provision was removed from the final enactment, probably because the Colonial Office wanted to keep a check on New Zealand's colonial government. In 1887, Sir George Grey, by then also a former premier, moved the Election of Governor Bill to make the office of governor an elective position. The Bill was narrowly defeated 46–48, being opposed by the government of Harry Atkinson. In 1889, Grey tried again with another bill, which if passed would have allowed for a "British subject" to be elected to the office of governor "precisely as an ordinary parliamentary election in each district."

In 2006, political commentator Colin James suggested that the governor-general could be elected (or, more correctly, nominated to the monarch) by a 60 percent majority of votes in parliament. James argued that the New Zealand public should be given the ability to choose the Queen's representative and that the current system is undemocratic and not transparent. Such a system is not unique: the governors-general of Papua New Guinea and the Solomon Islands are nominated in such a way. Constitutional law specialist Professor Noel Cox, who is a former chair of Monarchy New Zealand, criticised the proposal, claiming that "[g]iving the Governor-General a new and separate source of democratic legitimacy could result in a separation between Ministers and Governors-General. (...) the Governors-General would have their own independent popular mandate, and become potential political rivals of the Ministers".

In February 2008, republican group New Zealand Republic proposed electing the governor-general as an interim step to a republic, arguing "Electing the Governor-General allows for easier transition to a republic because the populace is used to electing someone as a ceremonial de facto head of state." With the introduction of the Governor-General Act 2010, Green MP Keith Locke suggested parliament recommend the next governor-general's appointment to the Queen, with a recommendation endorsed by three-quarters of parliament. In its submission to the select committee considering the Bill, the Republican Movement suggested parliament appoint the next governor-general with a three-quarters majority plus a majority of party leaders in parliament, with a similar dismissal process and a fixed five-year term. National MP Nikki Kaye queried whether several single-member parties in parliament could veto the decision, suggesting this could give them disproportionate influence if an appointment relied on one vote per leader. The Republican Movement responded that such a method would ensure appointments were made that most MPs and parties found acceptable.

== Tenure ==
The governor-general holds office at His Majesty's pleasure, under clause II of the Letters Patent 1983. It is the norm that an appointed individual holds office for a minimum of five years but this tenure may also be extended. The Terms of Appointment of the governor-general defines their expected term in office. For instance, Dame Silvia Cartwright would have been in office for five years on 4 April 2006, but her term as governor-general was extended by four months as Prime Minister Helen Clark deemed that "the selection and appointment process [of a new governor-general] [should] not coincide with the pre-election period".

=== Administrator of the Government ===
A vacancy will occur on the resignation, death, incapacity or absence from New Zealand territory of the governor-general. In the absence of a governor-general the chief justice (currently Helen Winkelmann) becomes the administrator of the Government and performs the functions of the office of governor-general. The administrator is required to take an oath similar to the governor-general. If there is no chief justice available then the next most senior judge of the New Zealand judiciary who is able so to act is appointed as administrator.

Prior to the granting of responsible government in 1856, the colonial secretary acted as administrator when a governor was absent.

== Dismissal ==
The prime minister may advise the monarch to dismiss (recall) the governor-general. As no New Zealand governor-general has ever been dismissed on the advice of the prime minister, it is unclear how quickly the monarch would act on such advice. Some constitutional lawyers dispute whether the monarch would implement such advice at all, while others argue that they would delay its implementation. Others argue that the monarch would be obliged to follow the prime minister's advice (so long as the prime minister has the confidence of the House of Representatives), and further that the monarch would be bound to implement the prime minister's advice immediately if so advised.

Critics (such as supporters of a New Zealand republic) have described the ability of the prime minister to advise the monarch to recall the governor-general as a flaw in New Zealand's constitutional makeup that gives the governor-general and the prime minister the ability to dismiss one another. They argue that this flaw is exacerbated by the reluctance of the monarch or their representatives to become politically involved.

Three 19th-century New Zealand governors were recalled from office: William Hobson (who died before he was officially recalled), Robert FitzRoy, and Sir George Grey. All three governed before the institution of responsible government in New Zealand; they were dismissed on the advice of the British (Imperial) government.

== Functions ==
The governor-general's functions can be informally divided into three areas: constitutional, ceremonial and community. By constitutional convention, the governor-general is "above party politics" and not involved in the day to day decision making of government.

=== Constitutional role ===
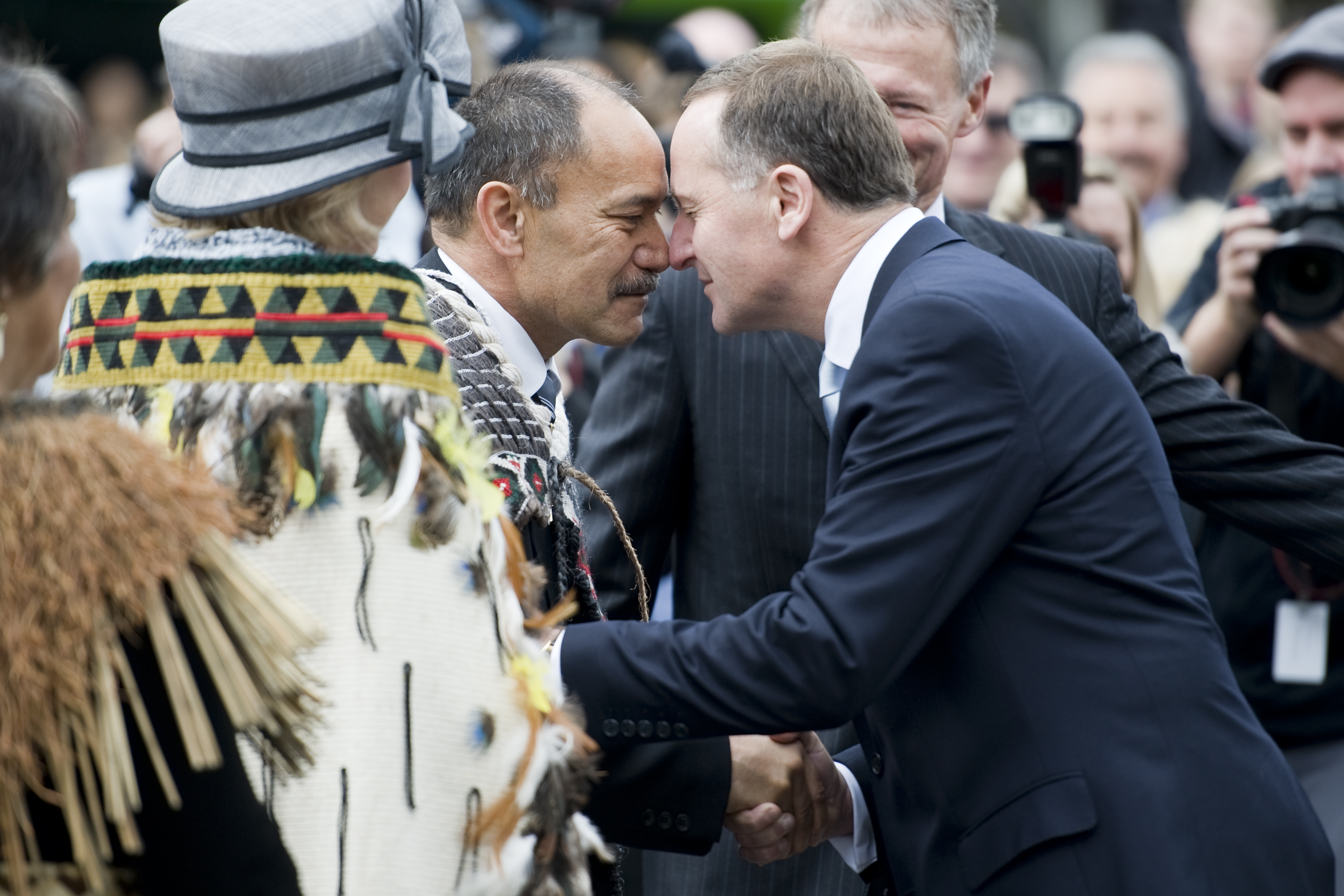
Governor-General Sir Jerry Mateparae performs a hongi with the Prime Minister at his swearing-in ceremony outside parliament, 31 August 2011

The Constitution Act 1986 provides that "the Governor-General appointed by the Sovereign is the Sovereign's representative in New Zealand". The governor-general is delegated the sovereign's Royal Prerogative (royal powers), including the reserve powers, on behalf of the sovereign. All of the executive authority of the New Zealand monarch (except for the appointment of the governor-general) is delegated to the governor-general by the sovereign under the Letters Patent 1983:

...We do hereby authorise and empower Our Governor-General, except as may be otherwise provided by law,— (a) to exercise on Our behalf the executive authority of Our Realm of New Zealand, either directly or through officers subordinate to Our Governor-General; and (b) for greater certainty, but not so as to restrict the generality of the foregoing provisions of this clause, to do and execute in like manner all things that belong to the Office of Governor-General including the powers and authorities hereinafter conferred by these Our Letters Patent.

— Section 3 of the Letters Patent 1983

When he is present in New Zealand the King may exercise his powers personally.

Every power conferred on the Governor-General by or under any Act is a royal power which is exercisable by the Governor-General on behalf of the Sovereign, and may accordingly be exercised either by the Sovereign in person or by the governor-general.

— Section 3 of the Constitution Act

Further constitutional duties are outlined in the Constitution Act.

The governor-general is a nominal chief executive, acting within the constraints of constitutional convention and precedent. Although the governor-general's powers are in theory extensive, they are in practice very limited; most political power is exercised by the New Zealand Parliament (which is composed of the Governor-General-in-Parliament and the House of Representatives), through the prime minister and Cabinet. The governor-general does use a number of remaining powers, but almost always on the formal advice of the prime minister and other ministers. Ministers are, in turn, accountable to the democratically elected House of Representatives, and through it, to the people. (The governor-general may refuse to follow ministerial advice only in the event that the prime minister loses the confidence of the House of Representatives.) Even when appointing a prime minister, the governor-general rarely exercises discretion; constitutional conventions dictate that they appoint the individual most likely to maintain the House of Representatives' support, usually the leader of the largest party among those forming the government.

==== Role in executive government ====
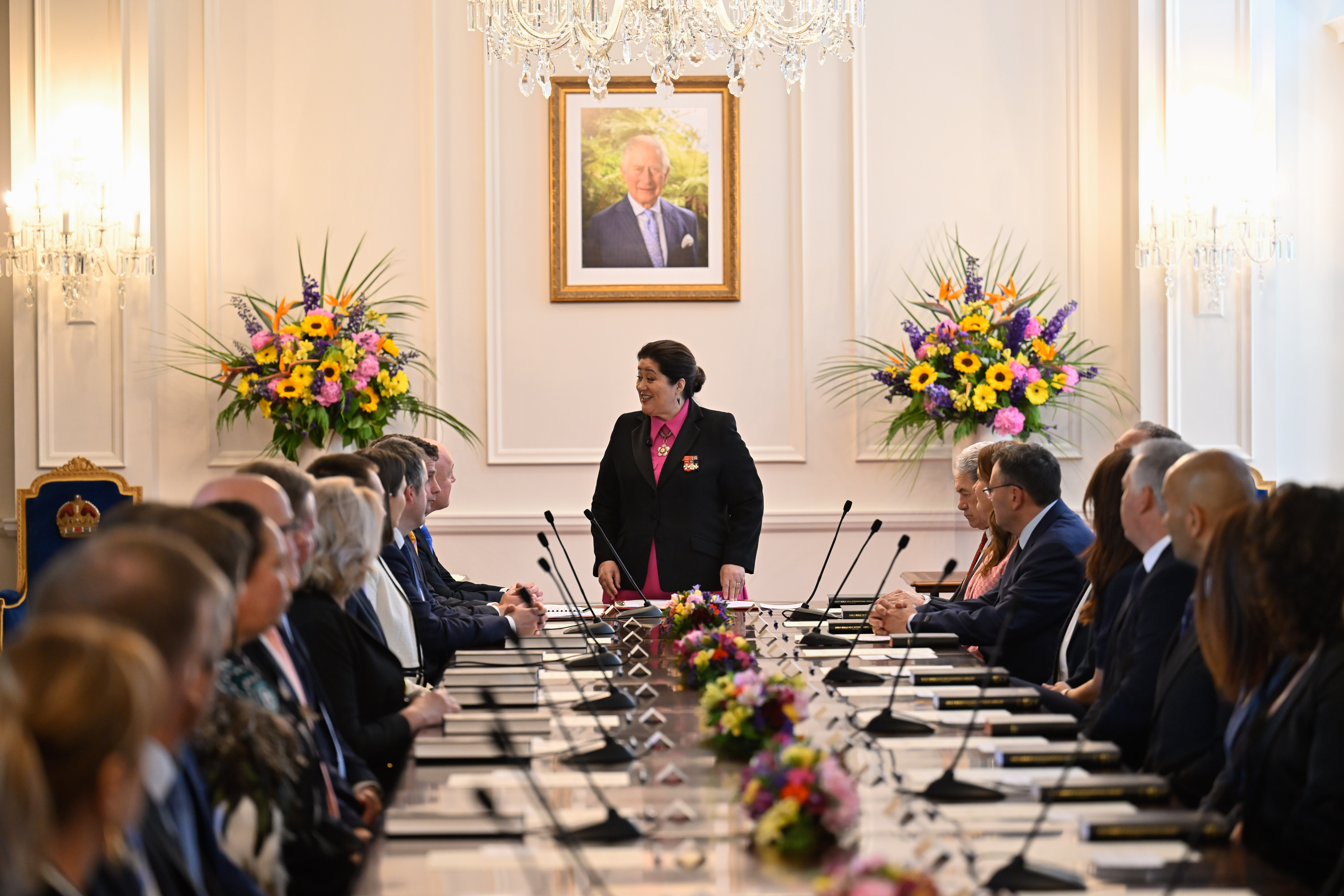
Governor-General Dame Cindy Kiro presides over the swearing in of the new Sixth National Government on 27 November 2023

The governor-general appoints and dismisses Cabinet ministers and other ministers, but exercises such a function only on the prime minister's advice. Thus, in practice, the prime minister, and not the governor-general, exercises complete control over the composition of the Cabinet. The governor-general may, in theory, unilaterally dismiss a prime minister, but convention and precedent bar such an action.

The governor-general presides over, though is not a member of, the Executive Council of New Zealand. The Executive Council (which comprises both Cabinet and non-Cabinet ministers) exists and meets to give legal effect to decisions made by the Cabinet. The primary function of the Executive Council is to collectively and formally advise the governor-general to issue Orders in Council (to make, for example, regulations or appointments), which operate under the authority of "the Governor-General in Council".

Every reference in any Act to the Governor-General in Council or any other like expression includes a reference to the Sovereign acting by and with the advice and consent of the Executive Council.

— Section 3 of the Constitution Act

The governor-general also has custody of the Seal of New Zealand for all official instruments of His Majesty's Government in New Zealand.

==== Role in the New Zealand Parliament ====
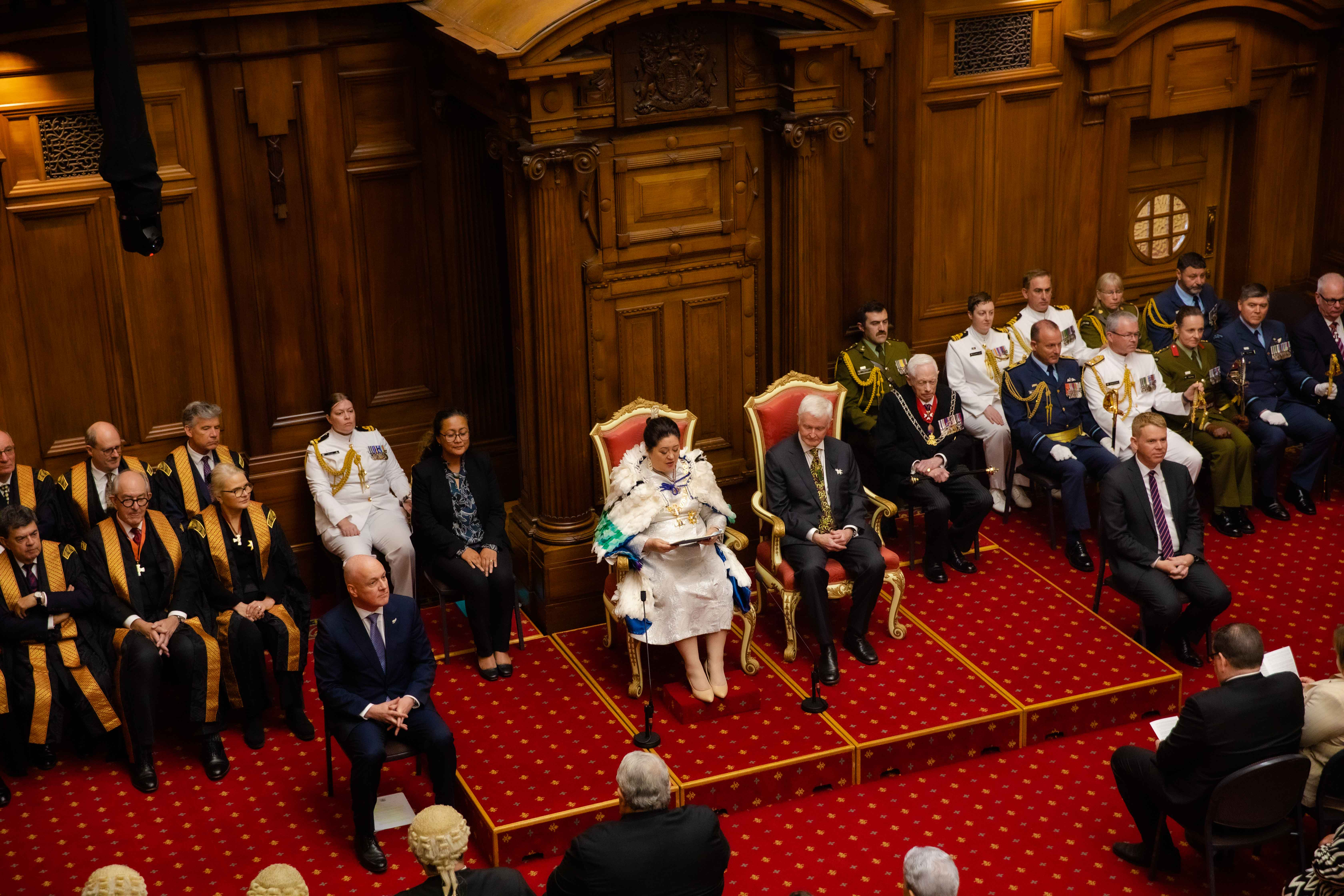
Governor-General Dame Cindy Kiro gives a speech from the throne at the opening of parliament, 2023

The governor-general summons and dissolves the New Zealand Parliament, acting in the absence of the sovereign. Each parliamentary session begins with the governor-general's summons. The new parliamentary session is marked by the opening of parliament, during which the governor-general delivers the 'Speech from the Throne' in the Legislative Council Chamber, outlining the Government's legislative agenda. Dissolution ends a parliamentary term (which lasts a maximum of three years), and is followed by a general election for all seats in the House of Representatives. (Note: The governor-general issues a writ giving permission for an election to be held. Following the election, the writ is returned to the clerk of the House of Representatives with the names of all successful candidates who have been elected to electorate seats.) These powers are almost always exercised on the advice of the prime minister, who also determines the date of an election. The governor-general may theoretically refuse a dissolution, but the circumstances under which such an action would be warranted are unclear. It might be justified if a minority government had served only briefly and another party or coalition seemed likely to have better success in holding the confidence of the House. (Note: See the advice of the Chief Justice, Sir Robert Stout to the Governor-General, Viscount Jellicoe, in 1923, that "unless the Governor-General was satisfied that a stable Government could be formed as [an] alternative to the present Government it would be proper to grant a dissolution if requested by the Prime Minister")

People tend to think the office of the governor-general is of little significance, which is wrong, or that it represents a substantial check on the excesses of executive government, which is also wrong.

— Sir Geoffrey Palmer

Before a bill can become law, the Royal Assent is required. The governor-general acts on the monarch's behalf and grants Royal Assent (making the bill law). By modern constitutional convention, the Royal Assent is invariably granted, and bills are never disallowed. A law comes into effect from the date the governor-general signs the bill.

==== Reserve powers ====
The governor-general acts with the advice of the prime minister, unless the prime minister has lost the confidence of the House of Representatives. These are the so-called 'reserve powers'. These powers include the ability to:

- Dissolve or prorogue parliament;
- Appoint or dismiss the prime minister;
- Refuse a prime minister's request for a dissolution;
- Refuse assent to legislation.

The exercise of the above powers is a matter of continuing debate. Constitutional commentators believe that the governor-general (or the sovereign) does not have the power to refuse the Royal Assent to legislation — former law professor and Prime Minister Sir Geoffrey Palmer and Professor Matthew Palmer argue that any refusal of the Royal Assent would cause a constitutional crisis. Constitutional lawyers, such as Professor Philip Joseph, believe the governor-general does retain the power to refuse the Royal Assent to bills in exceptional circumstances, such as the abolition of democracy. The Parliamentary Library notes that due to constitutional convention, the ability to withhold assent has been rendered ineffective, stating "...a Governor-General's powers to withhold the Royal assent to Bills (essential for legislation to be enacted) has been rendered ineffective by convention."

As with other Commonwealth realms, the governor-general's exercise of the Royal Prerogative under the reserve powers is non-justiciable; that is, they cannot be challenged by judicial review, unlike the actions of other members of the executive (such as the Prime Minister in Fitzgerald v Muldoon).

The Queen has the power to appoint and dismiss Ministers and other important office holders, summon and dissolve Parliament, assent to Bills passed by the House of Representatives, and agree to regulations and Orders submitted by Ministers through Executive Council. The Queen delegates most of her powers to her representative, the Governor-General. While the Queen and her representative exercise these powers as a matter of law, as a matter of convention, both the Queen and the Governor-General act on the advice of the democratically elected government, in all but the most exceptional circumstances.

— Former Governor-General Dame Silvia Cartwright, 2006 speech

==== Prerogative of mercy ====
The governor-general also exercises the royal prerogative of mercy, an ancient right of convicted persons to seek a review of their case where they allege an injustice may have occurred. The prerogative of mercy can be exercised where a person claims to have been wrongly convicted or wrongly sentenced.

The governor-general acts on the advice of the minister of justice. The governor-general has power to grant a pardon, to refer a person's case back to the court under section 406 of the Crimes Act 1961, and to reduce a person's sentence. If a person's case is referred back to the court, the court will consider the case in a similar way to hearing an appeal. The court then provides advice to the governor-general as to how to act. In 2000, David Bain was granted such an appeal to the Court of Appeal, which in turn was appealed to the Privy Council.

=== Ceremonial role ===
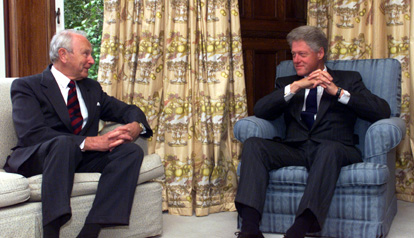
Governor-General Sir Michael Hardie Boys receives US President Bill Clinton at Government House, Wellington, 11 September 1999

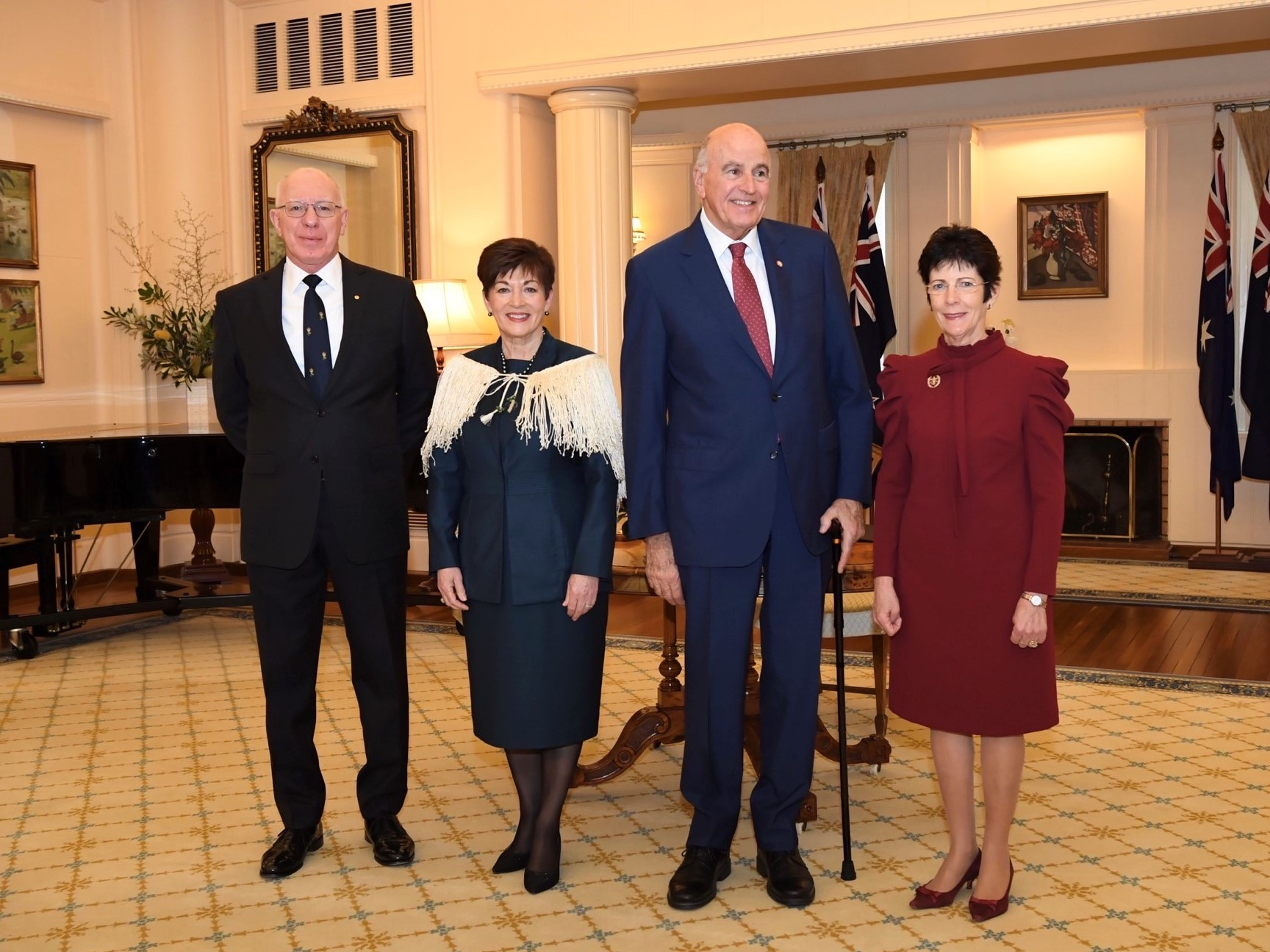
Governor-General Dame Patsy Reddy and her husband Sir David Gascoigne with Governor-General of Australia David Hurley and Linda Hurley in 2021

With most constitutional functions lent to the Government, the governor-general is particularly invested in a representative and ceremonial role. The extent and nature of that role has depended on the expectations of the time, the individual in office at the time, the wishes of the incumbent government, and the individual's reputation in the wider community. The governor-general will host the monarch or their family, as well as foreign royalty and heads of state, and will represent New Zealand abroad on state visits to other nations. (Note: Before a 2006 reform of the letters patent, the governor-general had to ask the monarch's permission, via the prime minister, before leaving New Zealand.) At least once during their term, the governor-general visits the other nations within the Realm of New Zealand: Niue, the Cook Islands and Tokelau, and the Ross Dependency. Also as part of international relations, the governor-general issues the credentials (called letter of credence) of New Zealand ambassadors and consuls, as authorised by the Letters Patent.

Increasingly, the governor-general is personally accorded the same respect and privileges of a head of state. This is particularity true when the governor-general visits other nations or receives heads of states. Prior to the Lomé Convention in February 1975, the Queen, rather than the governor-general, would sign treaties on behalf of New Zealand. Following the signing of the convention, the Queen granted "full powers" to the governor-general to sign such instruments.

Under the Defence Act 1990 and letters patent the governor-general is also the titular commander-in-chief of the Defence Force. The position technically involves issuing commands for New Zealand troops, though the governor-general only acts on the advice of the minister of defence and other ministers. In practice, the commander-in-chief is a ceremonial role in which the governor-general will see troops off to and return from active duty and visit military bases in New Zealand and abroad to take part in military ceremonies.

=== Community role ===
The governor-general provides leadership in the community. Governors-general are always the patrons of many charitable, service, sporting and cultural organisations. The sponsorship or patronage of the governor-general signals that an organisation is worthy of wide support. This follows the tradition of royal patronage established by British monarchs; the practice of issuing royal warrant of appointment has been discontinued in New Zealand. Some governors and their spouses founded or supported new charities; in the early 1900s, Lord Plunket and his wife, Lady Victoria, presided over the creation of Truby King's Plunket Society. Until the later 20th century, many governors and governors-general were grand masters of the Freemasons, and they included visits to lodges as a part of their tours of the country. The governor-general has also had a long association with the Order of St John, traditionally serving as prior in New Zealand.

Many of the governor-general's community functions have a ceremonial dimension, such as attendance at the official openings of buildings, addresses to open conferences, or launching special events and appeals. The governor-general attends state banquets and receptions, making and hosting state visits, meeting ceremonial groups, and awarding medals and decorations. As well as attending public events, the governor-general hosts many community functions at Government House, Wellington, such as a garden reception to mark Waitangi Day. According to the official website of the governor-general, in a typical year over 15,000 people will attend such events.

Starting from New Year's Day 2009, the governor-general issues a New Year's Message to bring to attention issues New Zealanders might consider as they look to the future.

== Salary and privileges ==
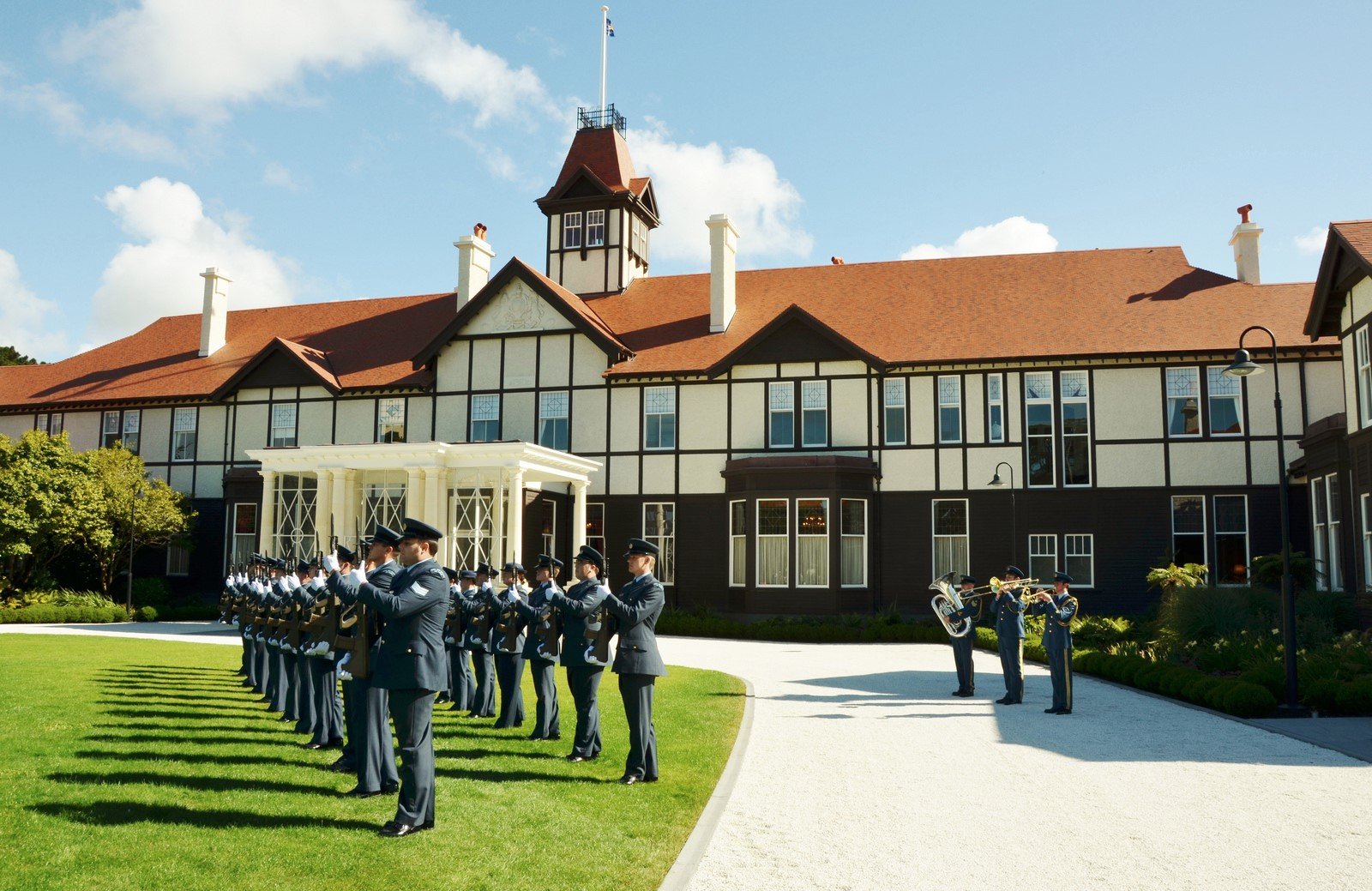
Government House, Wellington, the primary residence of the governor-general

=== Cost ===
The New Zealand Government pays for the costs associated with the governor-general. Monarchy New Zealand states "[t]his figure is about one dollar per person per year", about $4.3 million per annum. An analysis by New Zealand Republic of the 2010 budget shows the office of governor-general costs New Zealand taxpayers about $7.6 million in ongoing costs and $11 million for Government House upgrades, a total of $18.6 million. These figures are disputed by Monarchy New Zealand, who claim New Zealand Republic "arbitrarily inflated the cost of the Governor-General".

=== Salary ===
As of 2024, the annual salary is NZ$440,000, which has been subject to income tax since 2010. Until the end of Sir Anand Satyanand's term, the salary of governor-general was regulated by the Civil List Act 1979. From the start of Sir Jerry Mateparae's term, the Governor-General Act 2010 applies.

=== Residences and household ===
The governor-general's main residence is Government House, Wellington, and there is a small secondary northern residence, Government House, Auckland. Government House in Wellington closed in October 2008 for a major $44 million conservation and rebuilding project and was reopened in March 2011. In November 2012, Prince Charles opened a visitor centre at Government House in Wellington to mark the Diamond Jubilee of Elizabeth II.

The viceregal household aids the governor-general in the execution of the royal constitutional and ceremonial duties and is managed by an official secretary to the governor-general. All of the governor-general's staff are public servants within the Department of the Prime Minister and Cabinet.

=== Transport ===
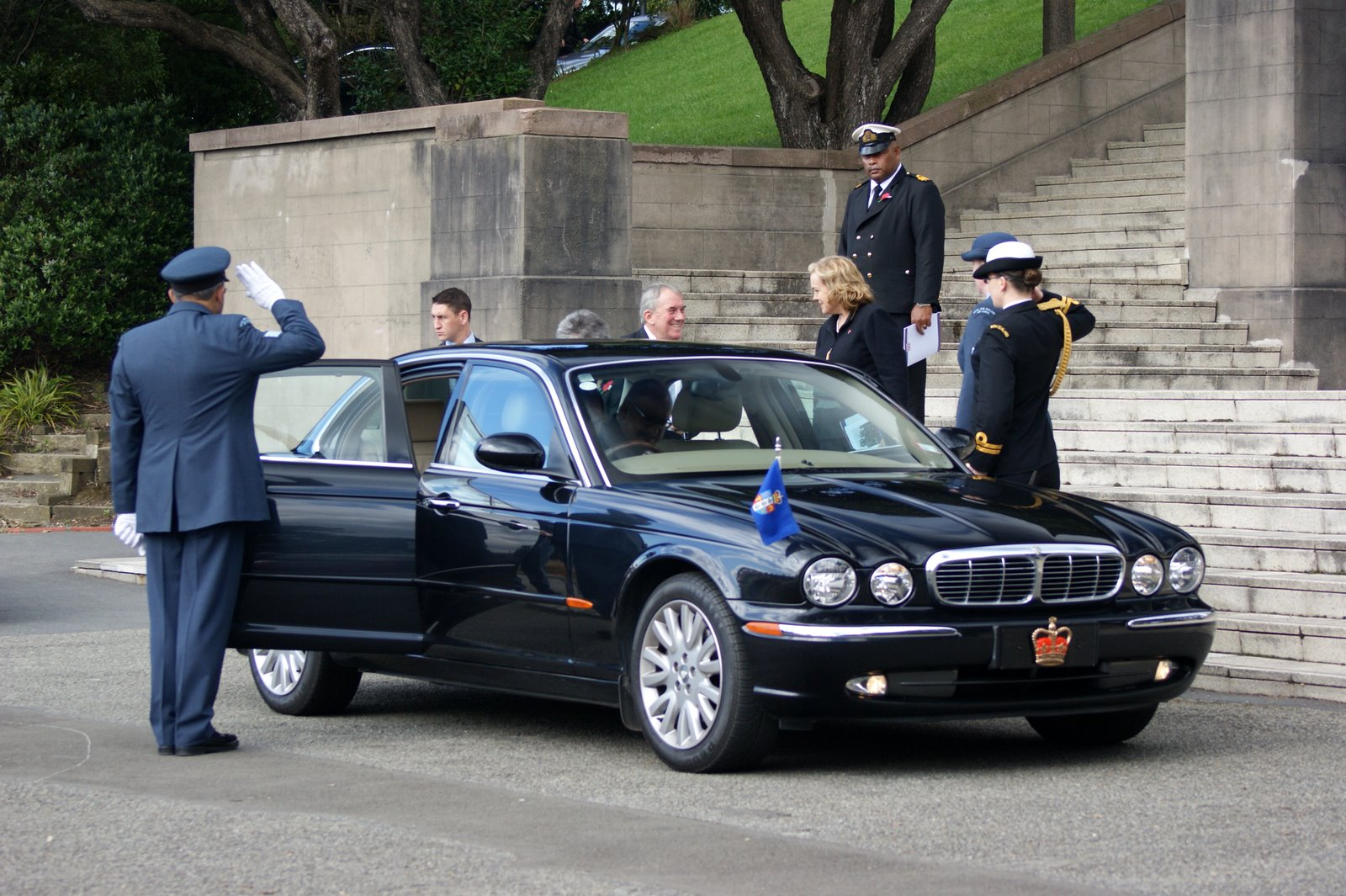
The official vehicle of Government House in 2010, a Jaguar XJ8. During official travel it is the only vehicle in the country not required to use standard number plates.

Since the 1960s the New Zealand Government has supplied Government House with an official state car to transport the governor-general on official business. It is also used to transport other state officials, as well as visiting dignitaries, including royalty. The governor-general's official vehicle displays a representation of St Edward's Crown instead of standard number plates. The current official car is a BMW 7 Series. It replaced a Jaguar XJ8, which was purchased in 2003 for about NZ$160,000. The Jaguar was auctioned off in August 2011.

=== Symbols ===
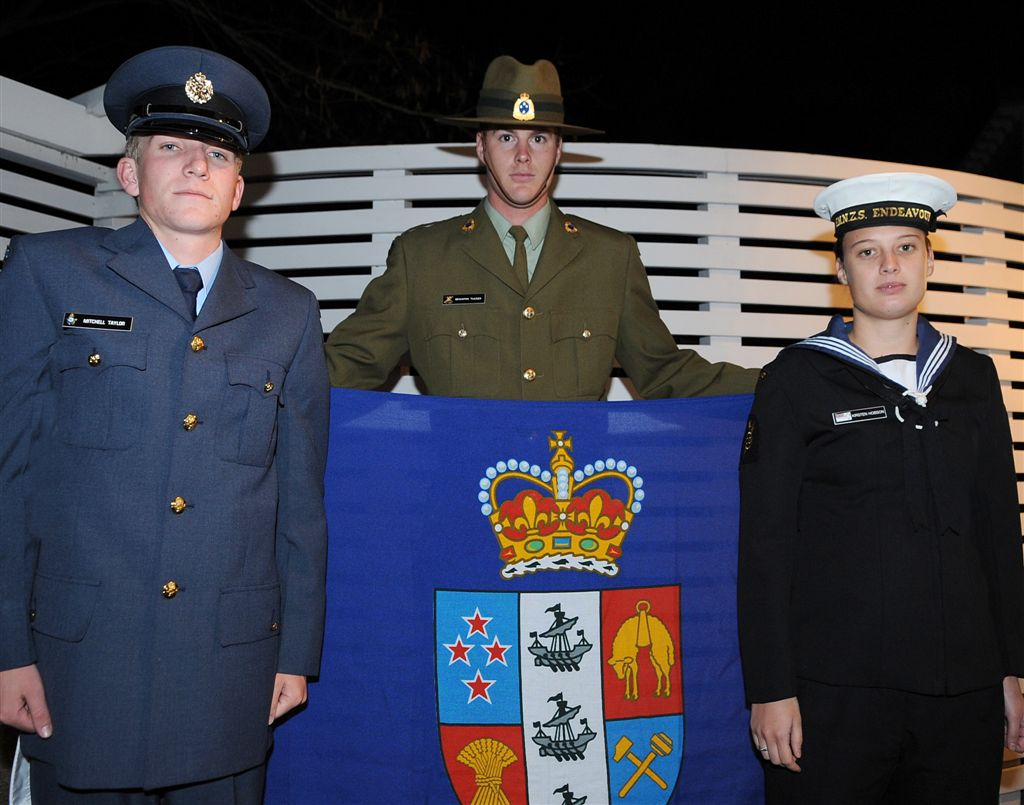
Military personnel holding the governor-general's flag. This flag was first flown on 5 June 2008.

The governor-general's flag may be flown from a vehicle in which the governor-general is travelling, or from a building in which the governor-general is present or is residing. The flag in its present form was adopted in 2008 and is a blue field with the shield of the New Zealand coat of arms surmounted by a crown in the centre. It takes precedence over the national flag. The national flag is generally employed when the governor-general undertakes a state visit abroad. The national flag is also flown at half-mast upon the death of an incumbent or former governor-general.

The design of the flag, with the shield and crown in the centre, mirrors the collar badge of the New Zealand Order of Merit which can only be worn by the sovereign and the governor-general.

A viceregal salute, composed of the first six bars of "God Save the King", is used to greet the governor-general upon arrival at, and mark their departure from most official events.

=== Precedence and titles ===
In the New Zealand order of precedence, the governor-general outranks all individuals except the sovereign. The governor-general and their spouse are styled "His/Her Excellency" during the term in office, and the governor-general is entitled to the style "The Right Honourable" for life upon assuming the office. From 2006, former living governors-general were entitled to use the style "the Honourable", if they did not already hold the title or the higher appointment of Privy Counsellor.

The incumbent governor-general uses the titles of Chancellor and Principal Knight or Dame Grand Companion of the New Zealand Order of Merit and Principal Companion of the King's Service Order. The governor-general is titled Sir or Dame.

=== Official dress ===
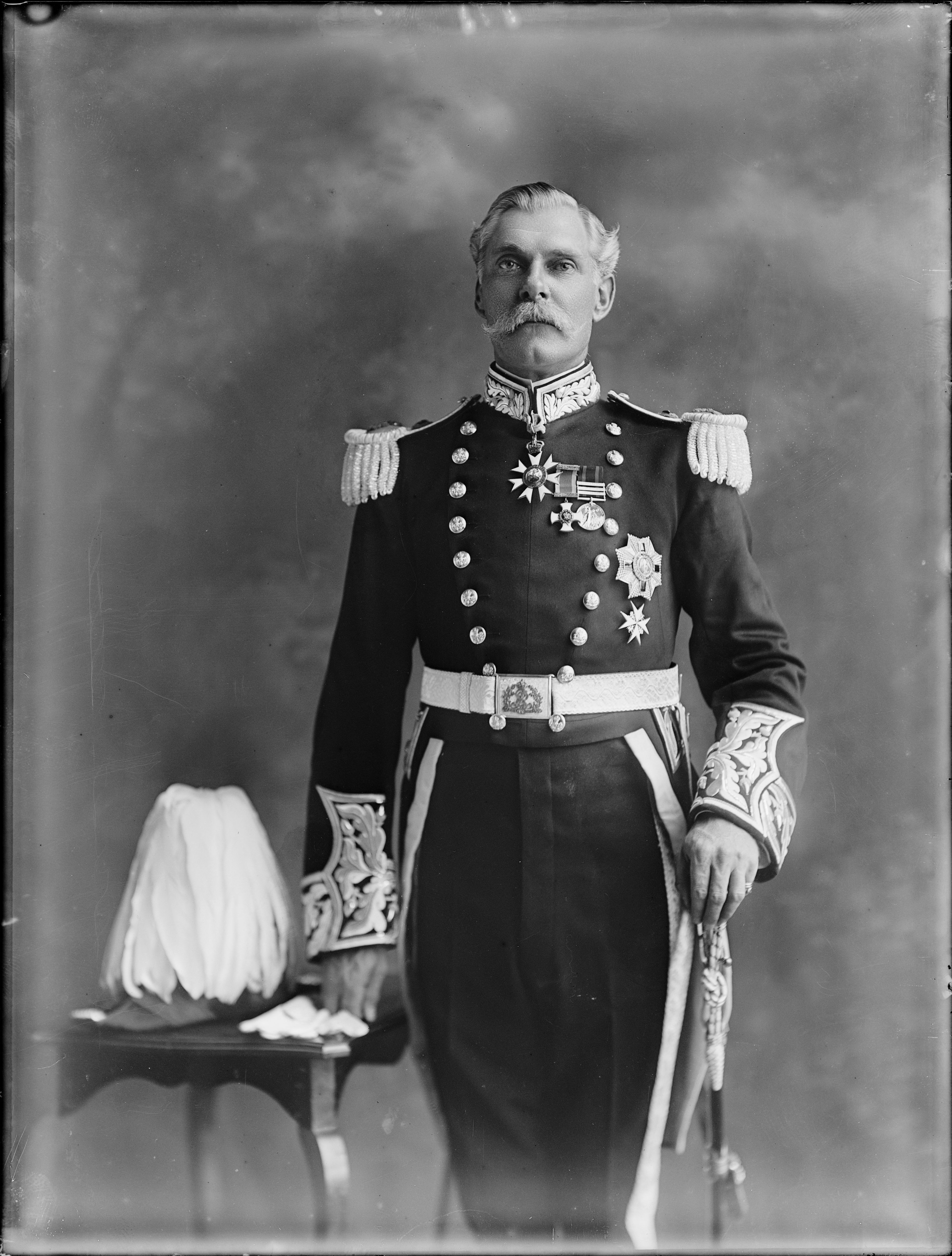
Lord Islington in the traditional ceremonial uniform

The governor-general is entitled to a special court uniform that is worn on ceremonial occasions, consisting of a dark navy wool double-breasted coatee with silver oak leaf and fern embroidery on the collar and cuffs trimmed with silver buttons embossed with the Royal Arms; bullion-edged epaulettes on the shoulders; dark navy trousers with a wide band of silver oak-leaf braid down the outside seam; silver sword belt with ceremonial sword; bicorne cocked hat with plume of ostrich feathers; black patent leather Wellington boots with spurs, etc. There is also a tropical version made of white tropical wool cut in a typical military fashion worn with a plumed helmet.

This dress has fallen into disuse since the 1980s. Initially this was due to Sir Paul Reeves, as a cleric, choosing not to wear a military uniform. Although not specifically colonial, the traditional dress was abandoned as overt reminders of a colonial legacy. Usually the governor-general will now wear a black lounge jacket with morning dress trousers for men or formal day dress for women (or military uniform if they are already entitled to it) for ceremonial occasions and normal day dress at other times. The undress form of the uniform is still worn on rare occasions, such as when the governor-general visits military bases.

== History ==
=== Governors ===
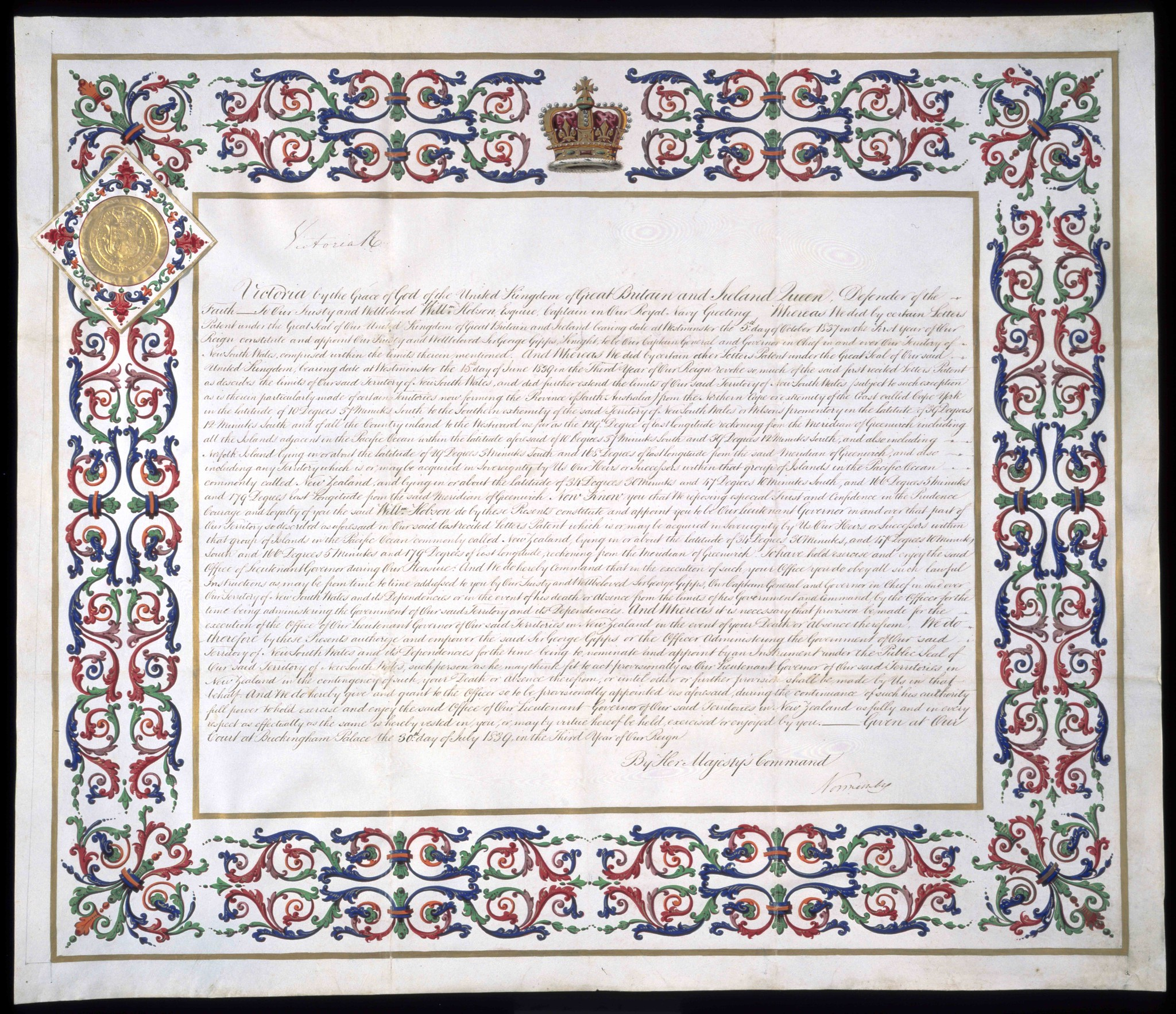
Document appointing William Hobson as Lieutenant Governor of New Zealand in 1839

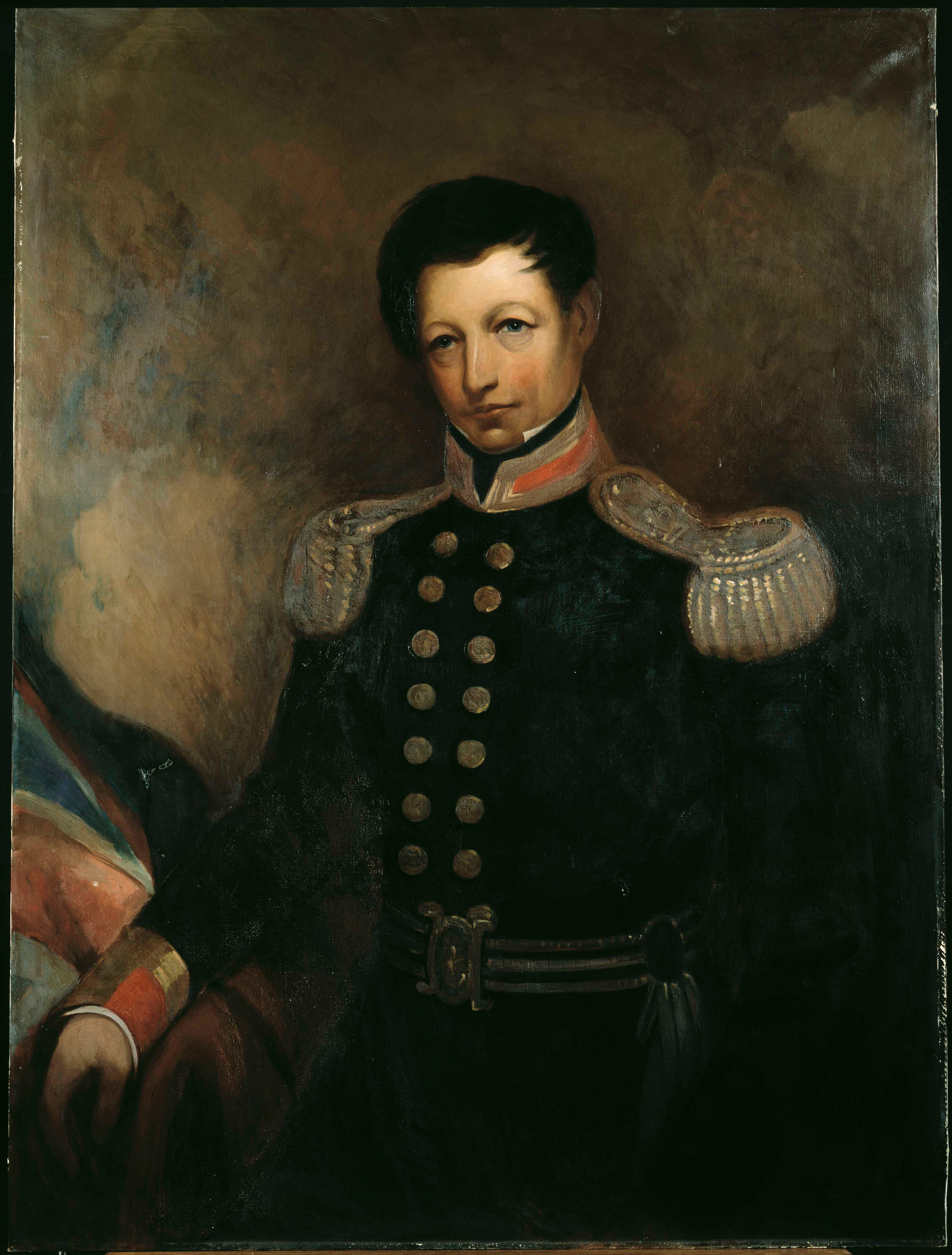
William Hobson, first Governor of New Zealand

From 1832 James Busby was assigned the post of official British resident in New Zealand. He played a role in drafting the Treaty of Waitangi, which established British colonial rule over New Zealand. Captain William Hobson was first appointed lieutenant-governor of New Zealand by letters patent on 24 November 1840 (having previously been the British consul to New Zealand), when New Zealand was part of the colony of New South Wales. While Hobson is usually considered the first governor of New Zealand, Sir George Gipps was the first governor over New Zealand, albeit only in his capacity as governor of New South Wales, until New Zealand was established as a separate colony on 3 May 1841. Hobson continued in office until his death on 10 September 1842. In Hobson's place the Colonial Office appointed Captain Robert FitzRoy. FitzRoy struggled to keep order between Māori and settlers keen to buy their land, with very limited financial and military resources at his disposal. Outbreak of the first armed conflicts of the New Zealand Wars and FitzRoy's siding with Māori claims against the New Zealand Company and its settlers over land deals led to his recall by the Colonial Office in 1845.

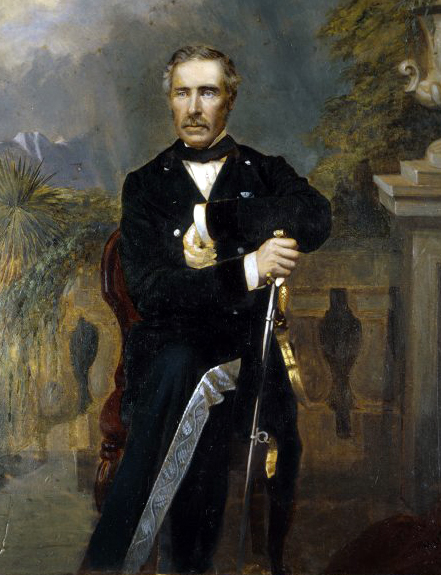
Sir George Grey, twice Governor of New Zealand and later Premier

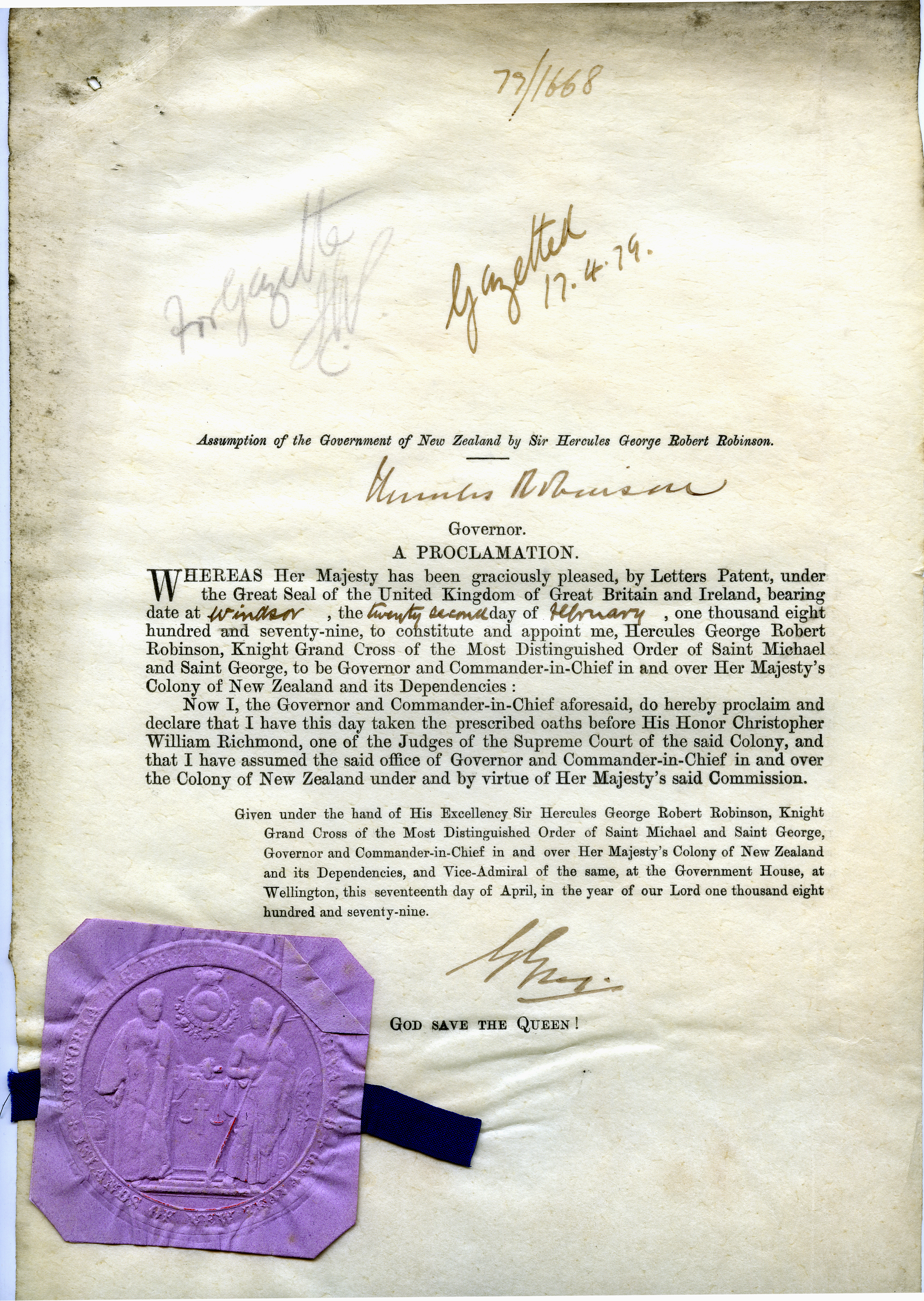
Hercules Robinson, 1st Baron Rosmead Proclamation as Governor (1879)

FitzRoy's replacement, Sir George Grey, is considered by some historians, such as Michael King, to be the most important and influential governor of New Zealand. Grey was the last governor of New Zealand to act without reference to parliament. During his first term (1845–1852), Grey petitioned the British Parliament to largely suspend the complex New Zealand Constitution Act 1846 (Grey briefly took the title "governor-in-chief" under the act but this was eventually reverted to governor), drafting his own constitution bill, which became the New Zealand Constitution Act 1852. Grey's first term ended before responsible government was implemented, although he established the first provinces under the 1846 Constitution Act, appointing a lieutenant-governor for each of the provinces: George Dean Pitt for the New Ulster Province and Robert Wynyard for the New Munster Province. The office of lieutenant-governor was superseded by elected superintendents with the implementation of the 1852 Constitution Act, in 1853.

The task of overseeing the transition to a responsible government was left to Robert Wynyard, as the administrator of the Government, who opened the 1st New Zealand Parliament on 24 May 1854. Wynyard was quickly confronted by the demands from members of parliament for the ability to select ministers from among their number—rather than the governor deciding. The parliament passed a resolution to that effect on 2 June. Wynyard and the Executive Council of New Zealand refused to allow this, stating that the Colonial Office made no mention of responsible government in its dispatches. Wynyard then offered to add some elected members of parliament to the Executive Council, which he did—a compromise that worked for a few weeks, until on 1 August 1854, parliament again demanded complete power to appoint ministers. Wynyard refused and prorogued parliament for two weeks. Then on 31 August, he appointed more elected members to the Executive Council, but when Parliament met again on 8 August 1855, it moved a motion of no confidence in the members. Fortunately for Wynyard the next governor, Sir Thomas Gore Browne, arrived on 6 September 1855. Gore Browne's tenure saw the introduction of responsible government, which constrained the powers of the governor, who now had to work with a premier and their ministers. In the following years, Gore Browne and Premier Edward Stafford clashed over whether the governor (and hence the imperial government) had control over Māori affairs, a key issue at the time with the ongoing New Zealand Wars. Stafford began the practice of Cabinet meeting independently of the Executive Council, further reducing the influence of the governor. Sir George Grey returned to New Zealand in 1861 for a second term. Grey struggled to meet the competing demands of the colonial and British governments. The New Zealand Wars had brought many thousands of British troops to New Zealand, and fearing further fighting Grey, with the support of Edward Stafford, evaded Colonial Office instructions to finalise their return to Britain. In the end, the Colonial Office recalled Grey in February 1868.

After Grey, successive governors of New Zealand were derived from the British aristocracy and played a much less active role in government. In only a few instances did the governor refuse the advice of the premier. Ironically this happened mainly during the tenure of Sir George Grey as premier of New Zealand from 1877 to 1879. One famous instance of the use of the governor's powers came during the term of Sir Arthur Gordon. Gordon had left New Zealand on 13 September 1881 for a visit to the Pacific Islands. In his absence, Premier John Hall advised Chief Justice James Prendergast (well-known for his negative opinions about Māori from his decision in the case Wi Parata v the Bishop of Wellington), acting as the administrator, to order the invasion of the Māori pacifist Te Whiti o Rongomai's village at Parihaka, something the Governor had indicated he was opposed to.

=== Governors-general ===
==== British subjects ====
In 1907 Sir Joseph Ward's Liberal government passed a resolution to turn New Zealand into a dominion as the Dominion of New Zealand. This led to new letters patent being issued in 1917, which greatly curtailed the powers of the governor. To reflect these changes, the office was renamed governor-general (equivalent to governors-general of other dominions), with Arthur Foljambe, 2nd Earl of Liverpool, the serving governor, becoming the first to be titled governor-general.

In 1926, following the King–Byng affair in Canada, an Imperial Conference approved the Balfour Declaration, which defined a British commonwealth as a freely associated grouping known as the British Commonwealth of Nations. The Balfour Declaration was ratified by the Parliament of the United Kingdom with the Statute of Westminster 1931. The effect of the declaration was to elevate the governor-general from a representative of the British government to a regal position with all the theoretical constitutional powers of the sovereign. New Zealand did not ratify the Statute of Westminster until after the Second World War with the Statute of Westminster Adoption Act 1947 being passed on 25 November 1947.

Despite adopting the statute later than most other Commonwealth realms, the functions of the governor-general in representing the British government were gradually reduced prior to the statute passing. For example, beginning in 1939, the high commissioner of the United Kingdom to New Zealand replaced the governor-general as the foremost diplomatic representative of the British government in New Zealand.

In 1945, New Zealand Prime Minister Peter Fraser suggested that Sir Bernard Freyberg, the British-born commander of New Zealand's armed forces, be appointed governor-general. Until 1967, the precedent was that governors-general were nominated by the British government's Foreign Office (and the predecessor Colonial Office) in consultation with the New Zealand prime minister, who then recommended appointments to the sovereign.

==== New Zealand citizens ====
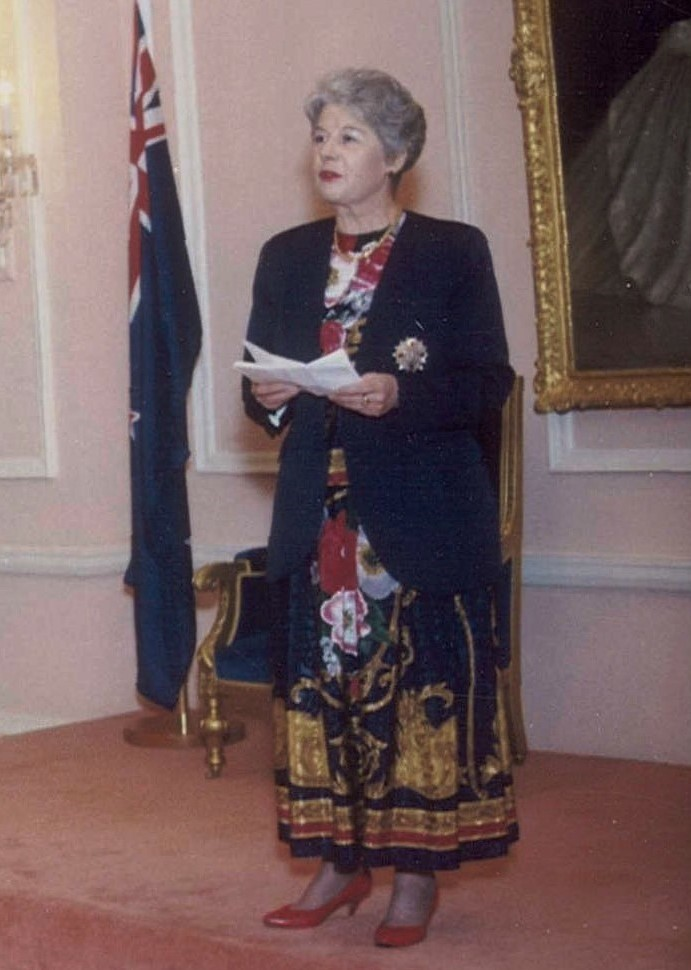
Dame Catherine Tizard, the first female governor-general, appointed in 1990

During the 1960s, the British government made strong overtures that the appointment of the governor-general should be made by the New Zealand prime minister and the monarch. A Gallup poll for the Auckland Star newspaper found 43 percent of respondents preferred Britons for the role, while 41 percent favoured New Zealanders and 6 percent candidates from other Commonwealth countries. In 1967 the first New Zealand-born governor-general, Sir Arthur Porritt (later Lord Porritt), was appointed to the office, on the advice of the New Zealand Prime Minister, Keith Holyoake. Porritt's appointment was followed by Sir Denis Blundell in 1972, who was the first fully New Zealand-resident governor-general. The appointment of New Zealand citizens and residents led to concerns that the constitutional convention that governors-general remain "above party politics" might be compromised, especially with the appointment of former prime minister Sir Keith Holyoake to the role in 1977. Despite this appointment, Holyoake was said to have acted in an impartial way, especially following the very close 1981 general election.

In 1983, letters patent were issued once again, further reducing the powers of the office. The new letters patent were counter-signed by the New Zealand Prime Minister, symbolising the "patriation" of the office. The governor-general now presided over the "Realm of New Zealand" instead of the "Dominion of New Zealand".

Following the 1984 constitutional crisis, the 1852 Constitution Act was replaced by the Constitution Act 1986 and the governor-general's powers further limited. For example, section 16 of the 1986 act significantly narrowed section 56 of the 1852 act so that the governor-general has much less discretion to refuse royal assent to bills of parliament.

With the patriation of the office came an expectation that the officeholders would be representative of New Zealanders generally; since then a more diverse group of governors-general have been appointed. Former Anglican Archbishop of New Zealand Sir Paul Reeves (served 1985–90) was the first Māori Governor-General. Dame Catherine Tizard (1990–96) was the first woman to be appointed to the office. Sir Anand Satyanand (2006–11) was the first Governor-General of Indian and Pasifika descent, and the first Roman Catholic to hold the office.

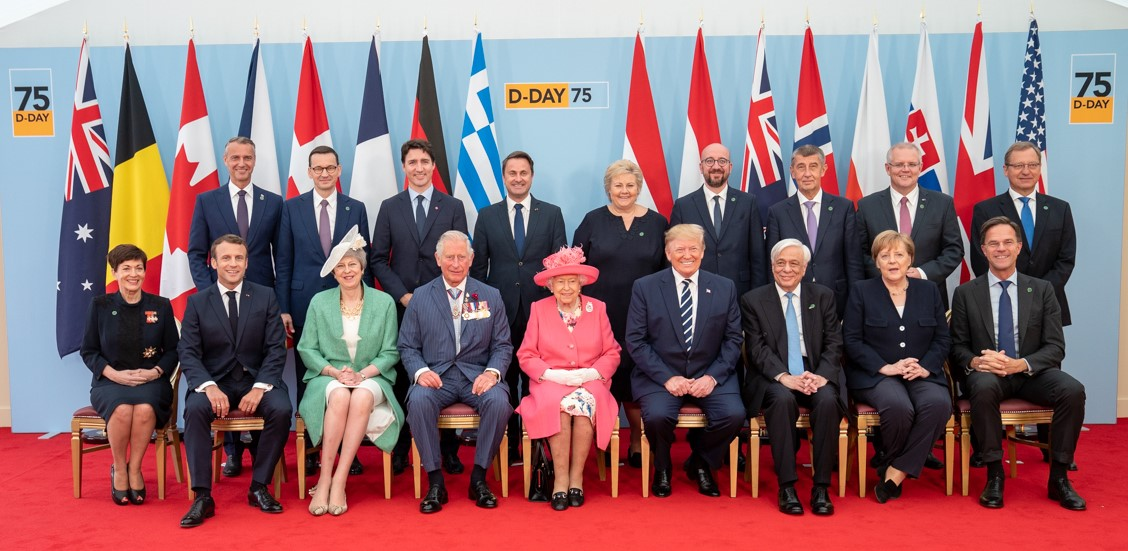
New Zealand Governor-General Dame Patsy Reddy (front row, leftmost) joins the Queen, other heads of state and heads of government at a D-Day commemoration in the United Kingdom on 4 June 2019. The governor-general often represents New Zealand at gatherings of national leaders.

Beginning in the late 20th century, the governor-general has been performing more and more of the head of state's functions, such as travelling overseas, representing all New Zealanders at major international events and generally promoting New Zealand interests abroad. The first time such a visit occurred was in 1989 for the death and state funeral of Hirohito, the late Japanese emperor. New Zealand governors-general could not make state visits until 1992, when the King of Spain invited Dame Catherine Tizard on a state visit for the Seville Expo '92. Advisers at Buckingham Palace stated that Elizabeth II was unable to travel abroad in her capacity as the queen of New Zealand. As a compromise, the Palace agreed that governors-general could accept invitations for state visits, but that it must be made clear that the governor-general is the sovereign's representative. At the 2007 commemorations of the Battle of Passchendaele, Governor-General Anand Satyanand represented New Zealand on behalf of the Queen, while the Queen herself represented the United Kingdom.

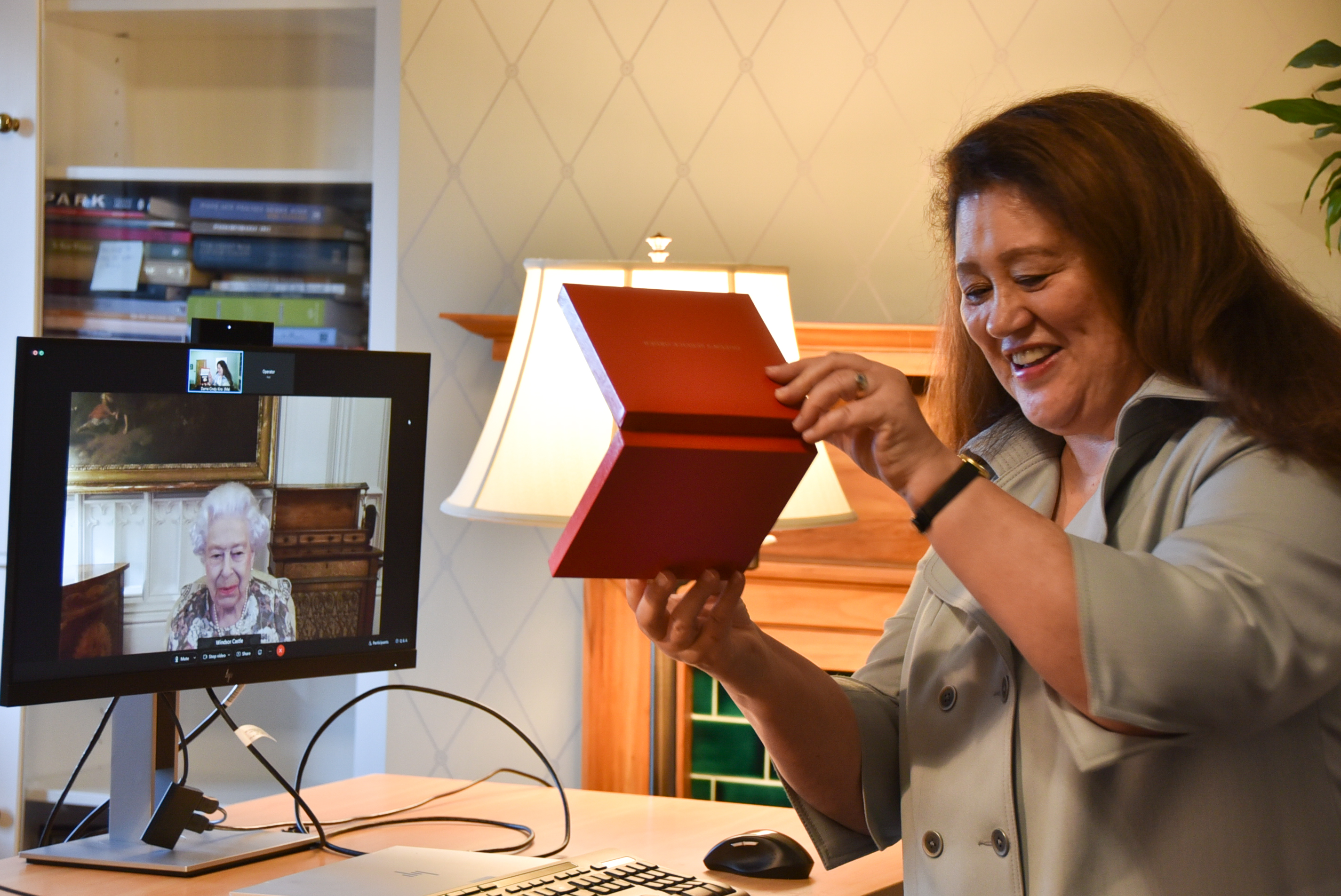
Governor-General designate Dame Cindy Kiro holds a virtual meeting with the Queen in 2021

Reform of the office is usually only mentioned in the context of a New Zealand republic. Helen Clark, while defending Dame Silvia Cartwright after a political controversy surrounding Cartwright's comments on prison sentences, stated, "[o]ne of the challenges for us is we clearly are no longer a dominion of Britain where the Governor-General is exactly like the Queen. I think we need to consider how the role of Governor-General might evolve further. As you know, my view is that one day there will be a president fulfilling the kind of role the Governor-General does." Others, such as Professor Noel Cox have argued that the governor-general's role needs to be updated, rather than reforming the office.

Some constitutional academics expressed concern that the process of electoral reform could result in the governor-general having greater political influence due to the reserve powers of government formation. In 1993, then Governor-General Dame Catherine Tizard caused controversy by suggesting that under the proposed mixed-member proportional (MMP) electoral system, the governor-general might need to use their reserve powers more often. This is because MMP elections usually do not result in a single governing party with an outright majority, thus requiring the governor-general to identify a minority parliamentary leader to form a government. Following the adoption of MMP at a referendum later in 1993, Prime Minister Jim Bolger suggested at the opening of parliament in 1994 that one reason New Zealand might move to a republic was that the governor-general would have more influence under the new electoral system. In a 1996 address, Governor-General Sir Michael Hardie Boys clarified how he would use his powers in the case of an unclear electoral result; he maintained that politicians must decide who would govern, and only after a public announcement of their decision would he appoint a prime minister.

In December 2009 a review of the Civil List Act 1979 by the Law Commission recommended that part 1 of the act be repealed, and replaced with a new Governor-General Bill to reflect the nature of the modern office of governor-general. The most significant change would be that the governor-general was no longer exempt from paying income tax on their salary. The changes proposed in the report would take effect for the appointment and term of the next governor-general. The bill was introduced into the House of Representatives on 28 June 2010 and was granted royal assent on 22 November 2010.

In 2020 a poll by Curia, commissioned by New Zealand Republic, found 32 percent of New Zealanders thought the governor-general was the head of state, and only 18 percent could name the Queen as New Zealand's head of state (25 percent answered that it was the prime minister).

== See also ==
- Letters Patent Constituting the Office of Governor-General of New Zealand
- List of governors-general of New Zealand
- Armorial of the governors-general of New Zealand
- List of official secretaries to the governor-general of New Zealand
- Spouse of the governor-general of New Zealand
- Government Houses of New Zealand
- Orders, decorations, and medals of the United Kingdom and New Zealand royal honours system for an explanation of honours
