= 1985 Special Honours (New Zealand) =

Awards list for New Zealand

The 1985 Special Honours in New Zealand was a Special Honours Lists, dated 6 November 1985, to recognise the incoming governor-general, Sir Paul Reeves, and the outgoing governor-general and viceregal consort, Sir David and Lady Beattie.

== Order of Saint Michael and Saint George ==
=== Knight Grand Cross (GCMG) ===
- The Most Reverend Sir Paul Alfred Reeves – Governor-General Designate
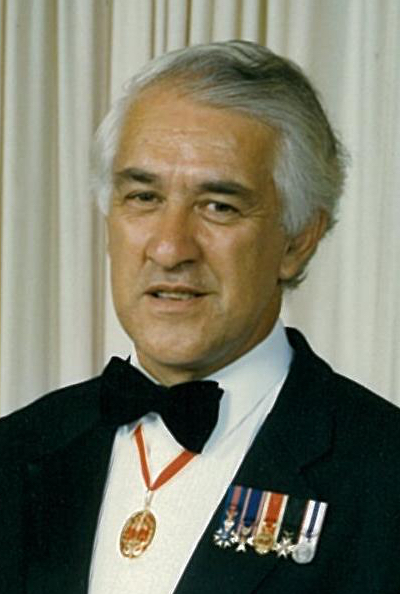
Sir Paul Reeves

== Companion of the Queen's Service Order (QSO) ==
Additional, for community service

- Norma Margaret Sarah, Lady Beattie

Additional, for public services

- The Honourable Sir David Stuart Beattie GCMG GCVO QC – Principal Companion of the Queen's Service Order and Governor-General and Commander-in-Chief in and over New Zealand since 1980
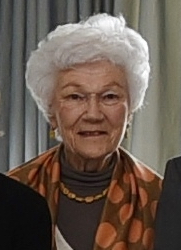
Norma, Lady Beattie

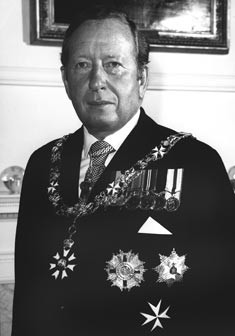
Sir David Beattie
