= Governor Reeves =

Governor Reeves may refer to:

- Paul Reeves (1932–2011), 15th Governor-General of New Zealand from 1985 to 1990
- Tate Reeves (born 1974), 65th Governor of Mississippi from 2020
