= Derek McCormack =

Derek McCormack may refer to:

- Derek McCormack (academic), vice-chancellor of the Auckland University of Technology, New Zealand
- Derek McCormack (writer) (born 1969), Canadian novelist and short story writer
