= Governor-General Act 2010 =

Act of Parliament in New Zealand

New Zealand Parliament
- Royal assent: 22 November 2010
- Commenced: 22 November 2010

Legislative history
- Introduced by: John Key
- Passed: 16 November 2010

Amended by
- None

Related legislation
- Civil List Act 1979
- Status: Current legislation

The Governor-General Act 2010 (Public Act no 122 2010) is an Act of the Parliament of New Zealand. It reformed the Governor-General of New Zealand's financial programme.

== Background ==
In 2007, the New Zealand Law Commission began a review of the Civil List Act 1979, with an issues paper being released in July 2008. In a press release, Law Commission President Sir Geoffrey Palmer said "The Act has not been comprehensively reviewed for many years. Some of its provisions are outdated. Some of the language is archaic. There is some unnecessary overlap between this Act and other legislation which creates complexity."

The Clerk of the Executive Council, Clerk of the House of Representatives, Graeme Edgeler, Parliamentary Service and the Republican Movement of Aotearoa New Zealand made a submissions to the review, largely in favour of the Law Commission's recommendations.

The review was completed on 7 December 2009. The Law Commission recommended that part one of the Civil List Act 1979 be repealed, and replaced with a new statute to reflect the nature of the modern office of Governor-General. It included an example Governor-General Bill in the review's appendix. The most significant change would be that the Governor-General is no longer exempt from paying income tax on their salary. The changes proposed in the report would take effect for the appointment and term of the next Governor-General following Sir Anand Satyanand.

== Introduction and first reading ==
The Governor-General Bill was introduced into Parliament on 28 June 2010. Because the Bill was to be administered by the Department of the Prime Minister and Cabinet, it was introduced by Prime Minister John Key.

Green MP Keith Locke suggested Parliament recommend the next Governor-General's appointment to the Queen, with a recommendation endorsed by three-quarters of parliament. The Bill was passed unanimously and referred to the Government Administration Committee on 20 July 2010.

== Select Committee ==
Three submissions were received on the Bill. Journalist Derek Round submitted that the Bill should be amended so that the Governor-General succeeded the Queen following the end of the Queen's reign.

Monarchy New Zealand made a submission in support of the Bill.

In line with its submission to the Law Commission, the Republican Movement of Aotearoa New Zealand also supported the Bill. It also suggested parliament appoint the next Governor-General with a three-quarters majority plus a majority of party leaders in parliament, with a similar dismissal process and a fixed five-year term. National MP Nikki Kaye queried whether several one-member parties in parliament could veto the decision, which could give them too much power if an appointment was based on one vote per leader. The Republican Movement responded that the method would ensure appointments were made that most MPs and parties found acceptable.

The Select Committee reported back on 8 September 2010, and recommended that the Bill be passed. On suggestions made by submitters on the Bill for an appointment and dismissal process for the Governor-General, the committee stated "As this bill has a single focus on the financial arrangements of the Governor-General, we were advised that all of these issues lie outside its scope." The committee sought advice from the office of the Clerk of the House of Representatives, who advised the amendments were out of scope.

== Second Reading and Committee of the Whole House ==
The Second Reading debate took place on 13 September 2010. The Bill was again passed unanimously. The Committee of the Whole House stage occurred on 26 October 2010.

== Third Reading and Royal assent ==
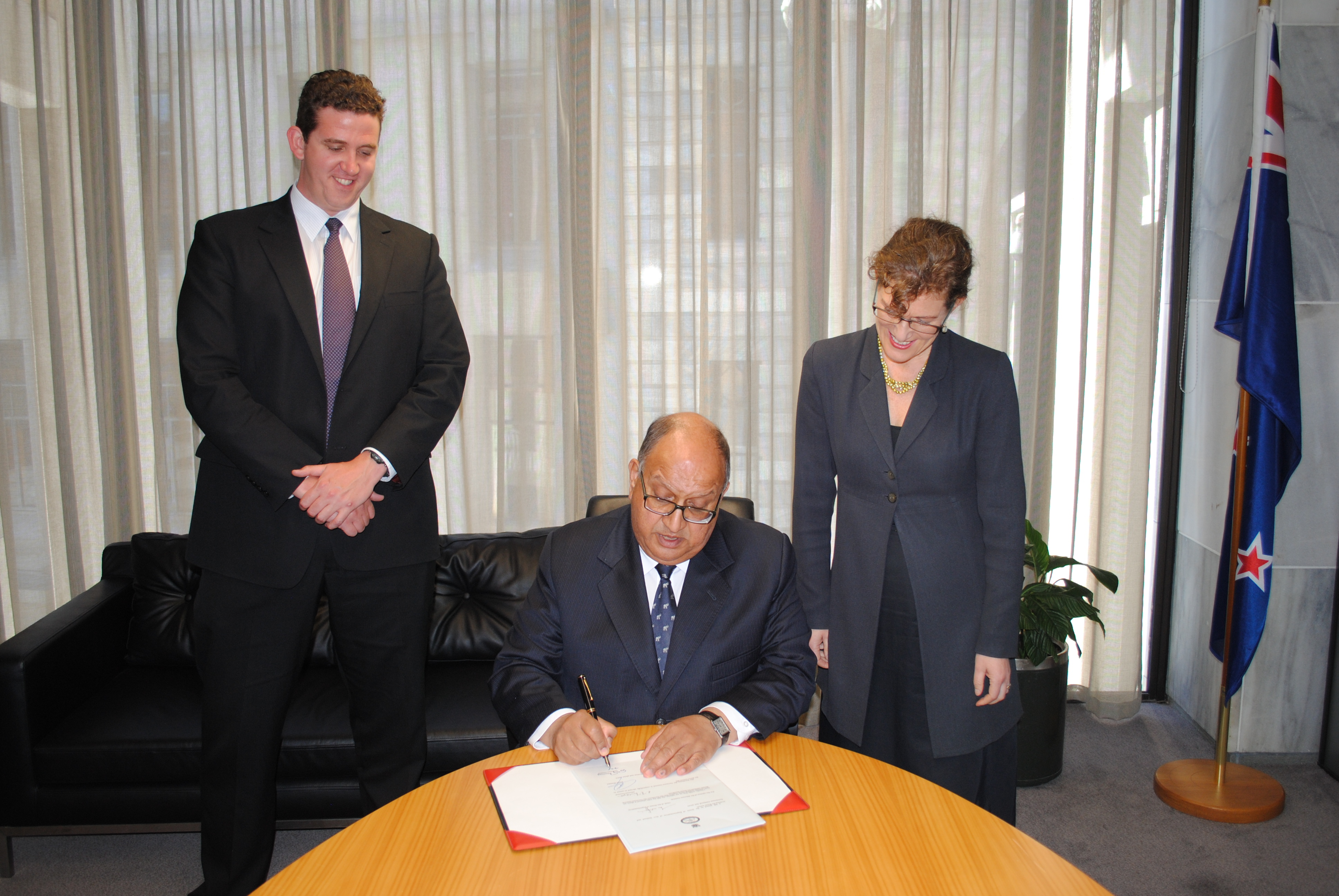
The governor-general, Sir Anand Satyanand, gives royal assent to the act on 22 November 2010, watched by Sean Kinsler (left), adviser (legal and constitutional) in the Cabinet Office, and Rebecca Kitteridge (right), clerk of the Executive Council and secretary to Cabinet

The third reading debate occurred on 16 November 2010. The Bill was granted Royal Assent on 22 November 2010.

== See also ==
- Governor-General of New Zealand
