= John Hinchcliff =

New Zealand university administrator, philosopher, politician and peace campaigner

John Hinchcliff CNZM

1st Vice-chancellor of AUT
- In office 2000–2003
- Succeeded by: Derek McCormack

Personal details
- Born: John Clarence Hinchcliff; 9 October 1939 (age 87) Wairoa, New Zealand
- Party: Labour
- Spouse: Laurie Danz (m. 1964)
- Children: 6
- Relatives: Geoffrey Palmer (brother-in-law)

Academic background
- Education: Drew University
- Thesis: The logic of mystery: an analysis based on some contemporary philosophies (1969)

Academic work
- Discipline: Philosophy
- Institutions: Hampden–Sydney College; University of Auckland; Royal Melbourne Institute of Technology; Auckland University of Technology

John Clarence Hinchcliff CNZM (born 9 October 1939) is a New Zealand university administrator, philosopher, politician and peace campaigner.

== Biography ==
Hinchcliff was born in Wairoa on 9 October 1939, the son of Frank and Gwen Hinchcliff. He was educated at Nelson College from 1953 to 1958, where he was head prefect in his final year, and was a member of the school's 1st XV rugby union and first XI cricket teams. He then studied at the University of Canterbury, where he earned a Master of Arts (Hons) in philosophy. He was awarded a Rotary Foundation Fellowship, providing funding for a year anywhere in the world, choosing to go to the Middle East. He met his wife, Laurie Danz, while studying at the Hebrew University in Jerusalem, and they married in 1964. The couple went on to have six children.

After his time studying and working in Israel, Hinchcliff went to the United States where he attained a PhD at Drew University, New Jersey. He then taught both there and at the North-East Business Machines School. From 1969 to 1973 he was assistant professor of philosophy at Hampden–Sydney College in Virginia. He returned to New Zealand to take up the position of chaplain at the University of Auckland. There he taught liberal arts, medical ethics and philosophy of genetic engineering. From 1980 to 1983, he was head of humanities at the Royal Melbourne Institute of Technology, where he taught social responsibility in science and technology as well as professional ethics as well as being heavily involved in administration of the institute.

Hinchcliff became involved in politics through the peace and nuclear disarmament movement and was a coordinator of the International Convention for Peace Action. He protested the visit of the nuclear-powered USS Pintado and was part of the flotilla that attempted to impede its entry into the Waitematā Harbour. Ahead of the 1975 general election, he took part in the "Citizens for Rowling" campaign. He stood for Parliament unsuccessfully as the Labour Party candidate in Eden in the 1978 election.

In 1984, Hinchcliff was appointed principal of the Auckland Technical Institute (ATI). He worked to transition ATI from a polytechnic to a university, and this was eventually agreed to by the government in 1999. ATI duly became a university from 1 January 2000, renaming itself as Auckland University of Technology (AUT). It was the first New Zealand polytechnic to become a university. From 2000 to 2003, Hinchcliff was vice-chancellor of AUT.

Hinchcliff was an Auckland City Councillor for three years. He represented the Tamaki-Maungakiekie Ward for the Labour Party from 2004 to 2007. In 2007 he stood unsuccessfully for Mayor of Auckland, placing fourth.

== Honours and recognition ==
In 1990, Hinchcliff was awarded the New Zealand 1990 Commemoration Medal.

In the 1997 Queen's Birthday Honours, Hinchcliff was appointed an Officer of the New Zealand Order of Merit, for services to education. In the 2003 Queen's Birthday Honours, he was promoted to Companion of the New Zealand Order of Merit, also for services to education.

In 2006, Hinchcliff received an honorary doctorate from AUT. In 2014, he was conferred the title of emeritus vice-chancellor by AUT, in recognition of his role in transitioning that institution into a university.

In 2022, Hinchcliff was inducted into the Drew University Rugby Football Club Hall of Fame as an inaugural member.

== Personal life and family ==
Hinchcliff has suffered from vision loss in later life, having both macular degeneration and glaucoma.

His sister Margaret is married to former New Zealand Prime Minister Geoffrey Palmer. In 2009 his son, Edward, collapsed suddenly in public, later dying of a brain aneurysm.

== Notes ==
Academic offices
New institution	Vice-chancellor of Auckland University of Technology; 2000–2003	Succeeded by Derek McCormack
