= Derek McCormack (academic) =

Derek McCormack, BSc, PgDip, MSc (Otago) DipTchg, was Vice-Chancellor and executive head of the Auckland University of Technology (AUT) in New Zealand.

He began his academic career as a biochemist at Otago Polytechnic. He later became the National President of the Association of Staff in Tertiary Education (ASTE). McCormack joined AUT as Associate Director Academic. From there he held a series posts, including Corporate Services Director, General Manager, and Deputy Vice-Chancellor Administration. McCormack succeeded the previous Vice-Chancellor, the Rev'd Dr John Hinchcliff in 2004. In July 2006 his term of office was extended for another five years.
