= Citizens for Rowling =

1975 failed New Zealand political campaign

- Author: David Exel
- Language: English
- Publication date: October 1975
- Publication place: New Zealand

The Citizens for Rowling campaign was a failed campaign to stop Robert Muldoon winning the 1975 New Zealand election. It was named after then Labour Prime Minister Bill Rowling in the lead-up to the 1975 general election. Members of the campaign publicly signed the "Citizens for Rowling" petition warning against a National government led by Muldoon. The campaign was largely organised by David Exel, a former television producer and current affairs interviewer.

Central to the campaign was a booklet, in the form of a petition, which attacked Muldoon's leadership style, which was stated as being "divisive" and "moving towards factional strife". Ads were run in major papers around New Zealand asking people to 'stand up and be counted' as supporting Bill Rowling and the campaign. Many offshoot groups were formed, such as Lawyers for Rowling and Clergy for Rowling. Rowling's eldest son, Carl, also joined the campaign.

== Prominent members ==
Prominent members of the campaign included:

- Muriel Blackburn
- Sir Jack Harris
- Sir Edmund Hillary
- John Hinchcliff
- John Jeffries
- Graham Nuthall
- Geoffrey Palmer
- Sir Paul Reeves
- Walter Scott

== Outcome ==
Despite gaining a lot of press for Labour, the campaign did not succeed, with Muldoon launching a public denial of the claims and stating, "The average chap doesn't want to be told how to vote." Labour went on to lose power after the 1975 general election. While highlighting Rowling's strengths, the campaign did not play to them. According to biographer John Henderson, Rowling "...was averse to the public image grooming process − the play-acting side of politics repelled him."

The publication came up again after the controversial decision by Muldoon to appoint Keith Holyoake as Governor-General in 1977. Rowling said that should Labour win the 1978 general election, he would remove Holyoake as Governor-General and openly stated that he would have appointed Sir Edmund Hillary to the post. That was criticised by Muldoon's government, as Hillary had notably backed Labour in the "Citizens for Rowling" campaign in 1975. Fellow Citizen Sir Paul Reeves was appointed Governor-General by the Fourth Labour Government in 1985.

== See also ==
- Third Labour Government of New Zealand
- It's Time (New Zealand campaign) – Norman Kirk's 1972 election campaign
