= David Beattie =

Governor-General of New Zealand from 1980 to 1985

The Honourable Sir David Beattie GCMG, GCVO, QSO, KStJ, QC
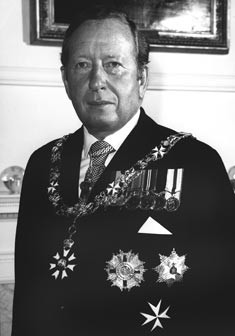
- Beattie in c. 1980

14th Governor-General of New Zealand
- In office 6 November 1980 – 10 November 1985
- Monarch: Elizabeth II
- Prime Minister: Robert Muldoon; David Lange
- Preceded by: Sir Keith Holyoake
- Succeeded by: Sir Paul Reeves

Personal details
- Born: 29 February 1924 Sydney, New South Wales, Australia
- Died: 4 February 2001 (aged 76) Upper Hutt, New Zealand
- Spouse: Norma Margaret Sarah Macdonald (m. 1950)
- Profession: Judge

Sir David Stuart Beattie, GCMG, GCVO, QSO, KStJ, QC (29 February 1924 – 4 February 2001) was an Australian-born New Zealand judge who served as the 14th governor-general of New Zealand from 1980 to 1985. During the 1984 constitutional crisis, Beattie was nearly forced to dismiss the sitting prime minister, Robert Muldoon.

== Early life and family ==
Born in Sydney, Australia, on 29 February 1924, Beattie was the son of Una Mary and Joseph Nesbitt Beattie. He was brought up by his mother in Takapuna, New Zealand, and educated at Dilworth School in Auckland.

In 1941, at age 17, Beattie joined the army during the Second World War, and rose to the rank of sergeant before transferring to the Royal New Zealand Naval Volunteer Reserve as a sub-lieutenant. He played rugby union for New Zealand services teams in 1944 and 1945.

In 1950, Beattie married Norma Margaret Sarah Macdonald, and the couple had seven children.

== Legal career ==
After the war, Beattie studied law at Auckland University College, and graduated with a Bachelor of Laws in 1949, before setting up in private practice as a barrister and solicitor. He was made a Queen's Counsel in 1964, and served as president of the Auckland District Law Society in 1965. In 1969, Beattie was appointed as a Supreme Court judge (the old name for the High Court, not to be confused with the new final court of appeal, the Supreme Court of New Zealand), serving on the bench until 1980.

Beattie chaired the 1977–78 Royal Commission on the Courts. In 1977, he was awarded the Queen Elizabeth II Silver Jubilee Medal.

== Governor General of the Commonwealth Realm of New Zealand ==
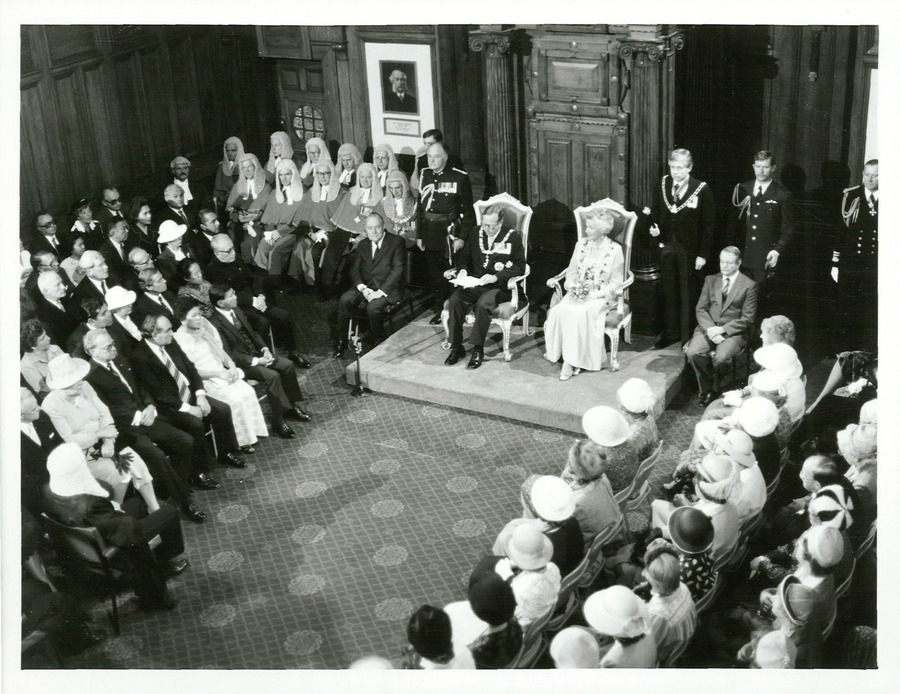
Beattie delivers the speech from the throne at the Opening of Parliament, 1982

On 1 August 1980 Beattie was appointed as a Knight Grand Cross of the Order of St Michael and St George and was granted the right to retain the title of The Honourable for life. One of the roles of governor-general is to act as the Prior of Order of St John in New Zealand, and Beattie was appointed as a Knight of the Order of St John of Jerusalem just prior to assuming the office of Governor-General of New Zealand. He was appointed as governor-general by Queen Elizabeth II on the advice of her New Zealand Prime Minister Robert Muldoon, his term of office beginning on 6 November 1980 and continuing until 10 November 1985. On leaving office, both Sir David and Lady Beattie were appointed as Companions of the Queen's Service Order: Sir David was recognised for his public services and Lady Beattie for community service. In 1983, he was awarded an honorary Doctor of Laws by the University of Auckland.

=== Controversies ===
At the height of the Springbok tour of 1981, Beattie met a delegation from Halt All Racist Tours. Beattie promised to discuss their issues with the Prime Minister Robert Muldoon. Beattie was ridiculed by supporters of the tour, and as a result, the prime minister refused to speak to the governor-general about his meeting with HART.

Beattie again caused controversy when he met with protesters trying to petition the Queen at the 1983 Waitangi Day celebrations, after the prime minister had blocked all petitions. As a result, Muldoon declared that Beattie's term would not be extended beyond the traditional five-year tenure.

Beattie's final controversial move was to import two Mercedes-Benz cars at the end of his term in 1985. At the time the governor-general was exempt from paying taxes and thus exempt from paying import tariffs on cars as well. The tax benefit to Beattie was $85,000.00.

=== Constitutional crisis ===
Following the 1984 general election, a political crisis arose. Muldoon declined to follow the instructions of the incoming prime minister, David Lange, as he was constitutionally required to do. At the time, many felt that Muldoon should accede to Lange's demands. It has been stated that Beattie suggested to senior members of the National Party that he could dismiss Muldoon and appoint his deputy, Jim McLay, as prime minister before swearing in David Lange as prime minister (McLay was to replace Muldoon as leader later that year). However, such action proved unnecessary as Muldoon's cabinet threatened to remove him as leader themselves if he did not accept Lange's instructions.

The crisis led to an inquiry that recommended passing the Constitution Act 1986.

== Later life ==
After leaving office as governor-general, Beattie continued his involvement in public life, carrying out a number of government enquiries, and serving on company boards and sporting organisations. He prepared the Report on Science and Technology in 1986–87, the Report on the Police Complaints Authority in 1988 and was commissioner on the Fijian Courts in 1993. His company directorships included the National Bank of New Zealand, Independent Newspapers Ltd and MFL Mutual Funds Ltd. He was heavily involved in sports administration, serving as New Zealand Olympic Committee president for 11 years. He was president of the Olympic and Commonwealth Games Association in 1989 and was president of the Sports Foundation twice. His work was recognised with the award of the Olympic Order. He was also patron of the New Zealand Rugby Union, the New Zealand Boxing Association, the New Zealand Squash Rackets Association, and the Legion of Frontiersmen (NZ) Command. He was a keen golfer, tennis player and fisherman.

In 1990, Beattie was awarded the New Zealand 1990 Commemoration Medal.

Beattie died in Upper Hutt on 4 February 2001. Norma, Lady Beattie, died on 9 May 2018.

== Arms ==
Coat of arms of David Beattie
Notes The arms of David Beattie consist of: Crest Upon a wreath argent and gules, issuant from a circlet of estoiles azure and Pohutukawa (metrosideros exelsa) blossom a Piwakawaka fantail (Rhipidura fuliginosa) proper. Escutcheon Gules, on a chevron engrailed argent between three full bottomed wigs a royal crown between two bees proper. Supporters Dexter: A male athlete proper wearing shorts and a singlet sable. Sinister: A judge of the High Court of New Zealand in full ceremonial robes proper. Motto Pro civitate (For the Nation) Other elements Mantling gules and argent.

Government offices
Preceded by Sir Keith Holyoake	Governor-General of New Zealand; 1980–1985	Succeeded by Sir Paul Reeves
