= Monarchy New Zealand =

Political organisation

Monarchy New Zealand Arikinui Aotearoa
- Chair: Sean Palmer (since 2012)
- Founded: 1995; 31 years ago (Incorporated 3 April 1996, unincorporated 18 April 2019)
- Headquarters: New Zealand
- Newspaper: Crown & Koru
- Ideology: Monarchism

Website
- Monarchy New Zealand; Facebook

Monarchy New Zealand is a national, non-partisan, not-for-profit organisation whose purpose is to promote, support and defend the constitutional monarchy of New Zealand. In addition to the general public, the organisation's membership includes a number of academics as well as numerous lawyers and political figures. It is currently chaired by Dr Sean Palmer.

== Aims and principles ==
According to its website, Monarchy New Zealand's aims and principles include:

- To bring together New Zealanders of diverse backgrounds to celebrate and support the Monarchy of New Zealand.
- To promote, and engage in, the study of the Monarchy, and the roles of the Crown in the New Zealand system of democratic government.
- To inform the New Zealand public of the contemporary importance of the Monarchy for the New Zealand identity.

== Crown & Koru ==
Crown & Koru is Monarchy New Zealand's newsletter, published one to two times a year. It features news relating to the monarchy of New Zealand and information about the organisation. The journal was first published in 1998 under the title Monarchy New Zealand; it changed its title to Crown & Koru in 2010, and became an online-only publication from 2015.

== History ==
The organisation formed as The Monarchist League of New Zealand in 1995 and incorporated in April 1996. The founder was Merv Tilsley, and founding members included Professor Noel Cox (later a long-term Chairman of the organisation) and his brother, Auckland lawyer and vexillolographer John Cox, who later founded the New Zealand Flag Institute. The Monarchist League was rebranded Monarchy New Zealand in 2010.

In 2002, the group campaigned against the abolition of appeals to the Judicial Committee of the Privy Council and against the creation of the Supreme Court of New Zealand. The group held a dinner to mark the Golden Jubilee of Elizabeth II on 9 June of that year.

The group defended a private memo written by Charles, Prince of Wales in November 2004, in which he stated:

"What is wrong with people nowadays? Why do they all seem to think they are qualified to do things far above their capabilities? It is a consequence of a child-centred education system which tells people they can become pop stars, high court judges or brilliant TV presenters or infinitely more competent heads of state without ever putting in the necessary work or having the natural ability."

The League said that the Prince was misinterpreted, and that "[t]he memo itself was understandable and quite proper in the context in which it was written."

In 2009 the group welcomed the re-introduction of titular honours to the New Zealand royal honours system. Also in 2009 the group described the decision by John Key's National Government to allow the Tino Rangatiratanga flag to fly from public buildings on Waitangi Day as "potentially divisive".

In 2011 the group held a celebration in honour of the wedding of Prince William and Catherine Middleton, with around 300 monarchy supporters watching and celebrating the London wedding at the Mercure Hotel in central Auckland.

In April 2019, Monarchy New Zealand was dissolved as an incorporated society.

=== List of chairs ===
- Mervyn Tilsley (1995 – 2000)
- Professor Noel Cox (2000 – 2010)
- Simon O'Connor (2010 – 2012)
- Dr Sean Palmer (Chair since 2012)

Former Speaker of the New Zealand House of Representatives Sir Peter Tapsell was patron of the organisation from 2000 until his death in 2012.

Former Chair Simon O'Connor was elected to Parliament in November 2011. Former Vice-Chair Paul Foster-Bell was elected to Parliament in May 2013.

== Publications ==
- Crown & Koru – quarterly journal of Monarchy New Zealand (ISSN 1179-6588)
- New Zealand’s Monarchy – Monarchist League of New Zealand, (1998)

== See also ==
- Monarchy of New Zealand
- New Zealand Republic
