= Civil List Act 1979 =

Act of Parliament in New Zealand

New Zealand Parliament
- Long title: An Act to consolidate and amend the law relating to the civil list
- Royal assent: 26 October 1979

Related legislation
- Electoral Act 1993
- Status: Repealed

The Civil List Act 1979 was a statute of the Parliament of New Zealand which defined the allowances, salaries and annuities of the prime minister, ministers and members of Parliament. It was repealed by the Members of Parliament (Remuneration and Services) Act 2013.

== Analysis ==
The act was divided into 27 sections, over four parts.

=== Part One: Governor-General ===
This part defined the salary and allowance of Governor-General. It also included provision for an annuity for former Governors-General and spouses or partners of former Governors-General, compensation for lost or adversely affected superannuation rights, and travelling expenses.

Section 7 of the act granted the Governor-General an exemption from taxation.

This part was repealed and replaced by the Governor-General Act 2010.

=== Part Two: Ministers and Parliamentary Under-Secretaries ===
Part two of the act defined payments to Ministers of the Crown and Parliamentary Under-Secretaries.

=== Part Three: Remuneration ===
Part three of the act determined the remuneration of Ministers of the Crown, Parliamentary Under-Secretaries, and members of Parliament. It established the Remuneration Authority to fix salaries and allowances for MPs, and includes provisions for the Speaker of House of Representatives and Chairpersons of Committees.

Section 20 of the act allowed for deductions to be made from members' salaries and allowances, and defines travel, accommodation, attendance, and communications services for members.

=== Part Four: Miscellaneous provisions ===
Part four of the act granted annuity for former prime ministers and spouses or partners of former prime ministers. The act also defined payments to spouse or partner, or dependent children of member of parliament dying in office.

== Review ==
In 2008, the New Zealand Law Commission began a review of the act. In a press release, Law Commission President Sir Geoffrey Palmer said "The Act has not been comprehensively reviewed for many years. Some of its provisions are outdated. Some of the language is archaic. There is some unnecessary overlap between this act and other legislation which creates complexity."

The review was completed in December 2009. The Law Commission recommended that part 1 of the Civil List Act be repealed, and replaced with a new statute to reflect the nature of the modern office of Governor-General. The most significant change would be that the Governor-General is no longer exempt from paying income tax on their salary. The changes proposed in the report would take effect for the appointment and term of the next Governor-General. The Governor-General Bill was introduced into Parliament on 28 June 2010. It was passed as the Governor-General Act 2010.

== See also ==
- Civil list
