= Noel Cox =

New Zealand lawyer (born 1965)

The Reverend Noel Cox FRHistS
- Born: 3 June 1965 (age 61); Auckland, New Zealand
- Education: University of Auckland; University of Wales, Lampeter
- Occupations: Lawyer, legal scholar and priest

Ecclesiastical career
- Religion: Christianity (Anglican)
- Church: Church in Wales
- Ordained: 2012 (deacon); 2013 (priest)

Noel Cox FRHistS (born 3 June 1965) is a New Zealand–born lawyer, legal scholar, and Anglican priest.

== Personal ==
Cox was raised in Auckland, New Zealand. He is an advocate of the monarchy in New Zealand.

== Career ==
Cox earned an LLB and an LLM degree from the University of Auckland, an MTh degree, an MA degree in ecclesiastical law, an LTh from the University of Wales Lampeter, and a PhD degree in Political Studies from the University of Auckland. His doctoral thesis was titled The evolution of the New Zealand monarchy: The recognition of an autochthonous polity. His main field of research has been constitutional law. In 2004 he was elected a Fellow of the Royal Historical Society (FRHistS) for his work on Commonwealth jurisprudence.

Starting in 2010 he was a professor and Head of the Department of Law and Criminology at Aberystwyth University, Wales, but was dismissed on May 22, 2014, due to alleged breaches of University financial and data protection regulations, and according to a statement by the university, a breach of the University's duty of care towards a member of staff.

He was ordained as a deacon in the Church in Wales in June 2012 and a priest in June 2013.

== Publications ==
- The Coronation and the Constitution in the British Tradition (Palgrave Macmillan, London, 2025; ISBN 978-3-031-88959-2)
- The Royal Prerogative and Constitutional Law: A search for the quintessence of executive power (Routledge, Abingdon, 2020; ISBN 0367500795, ISBN 9780367500795)
- Priest of the Church or Priest of a Church? The Ecclesiology of Ordained Local Ministry (Rowman & Littlefield Ltd, London, 2021; ISBN 1978711859)
- Technology and Legal Systems (Ashgate Publishing Ltd, Aldershot, 2006; ISBN 978-075-464-544-3)
- A Constitutional History of the New Zealand Monarchy: The evolution of the New Zealand monarchy and the recognition of an autochthonous polity (V.D.M. Verlag Dr. Müller Aktiengesellschaft & Co. K.G., Saarbrücken, 2008; ISBN 978-3-639-00877-7)
- Church and State in the Post-Colonial Era: The Anglican Church and the Constitution in New Zealand (Polygraphia (NZ) Ltd, Auckland, 2008; ISBN 978-1-877-33260-9)
- The catholicity of ordained ministry in the Anglican Communion: An examination of the ecclesiology implicit in the validity of orders debate (V.D.M. Verlag Dr. Müller Aktiengesellschaft & Co. K.G., Saarbrücken, 2009; ISBN 978-3-639-12036-3)
- Academical Dress in New Zealand: A Study (V.D.M. Verlag Dr. Müller Aktiengesellschaft & Co. K.G., Saarbrücken, 2010; ISBN 978-3-639-29927-4)
- Constitutional paradigms and the stability of states (Ashgate Publishing Ltd, Farnham, 2012; ISBN 978-0-7546-7920-2)
- "Authority for the use of the Royal Arms in Churches". Ecclesiastical Law Journal. 2000; 5 (27): 408–416. https://doi.org/10.1017/S0956618X00004002
