= Paul Reeves =

Governor-General of New Zealand from 1985 to 1990

The Most Reverend and Honourable Sir Paul Reeves ONZ GCMG GCVO QSO KStJ
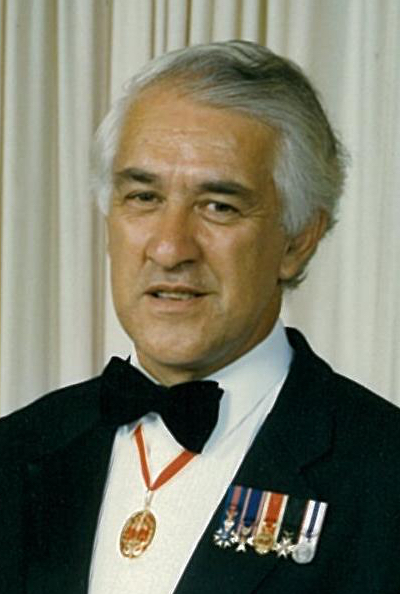
- Reeves in 1987

15th Governor-General of New Zealand
- In office 20 November 1985 – 29 November 1990
- Monarch: Elizabeth II
- Prime Minister: David Lange; Geoffrey Palmer; Mike Moore; Jim Bolger
- Preceded by: David Beattie
- Succeeded by: Catherine Tizard

Chancellor of Auckland University of Technology
- In office 1 February 2005 – 13 August 2011
- Succeeded by: John Maasland

Personal details
- Born: 6 December 1932 Wellington, New Zealand
- Died: 14 August 2011 (aged 78) Auckland, New Zealand
- Spouse: Beverley Watkins
- Children: 3
- Profession: Anglican bishop

Sir Paul Alfred Reeves ONZ GCMG GCVO QSO KStJ (6 December 1932 – 14 August 2011) was a New Zealand clergyman who served as Archbishop and Primate of New Zealand from 1980 to 1985 and as the 15th governor-general of New Zealand from 1985 to 1990. He was the first governor-general of Māori descent. He also served as the third Chancellor of Auckland University of Technology, from 2005 until his death in 2011.

== Early life and education ==
Reeves was born in Wellington, New Zealand, on 6 December 1932, the son of D'arcy Reeves by his marriage to Hilda Pirihira, who had moved from Waikawa to Newtown, a working-class suburb of Wellington. Hilda was of Māori descent, of the Te Āti Awa iwi; D'arcy was Pākehā and worked for the tramways. Reeves was educated at Wellington College and at Victoria College, University of New Zealand (now the Victoria University of Wellington), where he graduated with a Bachelor of Arts in 1955 and a Master of Arts in 1956. He went on to study for ordination as an Anglican priest at St John's College, Auckland, receiving his Licentiate in Theology in 1958.

== Religious ministry ==
=== Deacon and priest ===
Reeves was ordained deacon in 1958. After serving a brief curacy at Tokoroa, he spent the period 1959–64 in England. From 1959 until 1961 he was an Advanced Student at St Peter's College, Oxford (Bachelor of Arts 1961, Master of Arts 1965) as well as Assistant Curate at the University Church of St Mary the Virgin. He was ordained priest in 1960. He served two further curacies in England, first at Kirkley St Peter (1961–63), then at Lewisham St Mary (1963–64).

Returning to New Zealand, Reeves was Vicar of Okato St Paul (1964–66), Lecturer in Church History at St John's College, Auckland (1966–69), and Director of Christian Education for the Anglican Diocese of Auckland (1969–71).

=== Bishop, archbishop, and primate ===
In 1971 Reeves was appointed Bishop of Waiapu and consecrated to the episcopate on 25 March. He was Bishop of Auckland from 1979 to 1985, and additionally as Archbishop and Primate of New Zealand, the leader of New Zealand's Anglicans, from 1980 to 1985.

During this time Reeves also served as chairman of the Environmental Council (1974–76), and he served as president of the National Council of Churches in New Zealand (1984–85).

Reeves was a supporter of Citizens for Rowling (the campaign for the re-election of Labour Prime Minister Bill Rowling).

== Governor-general ==
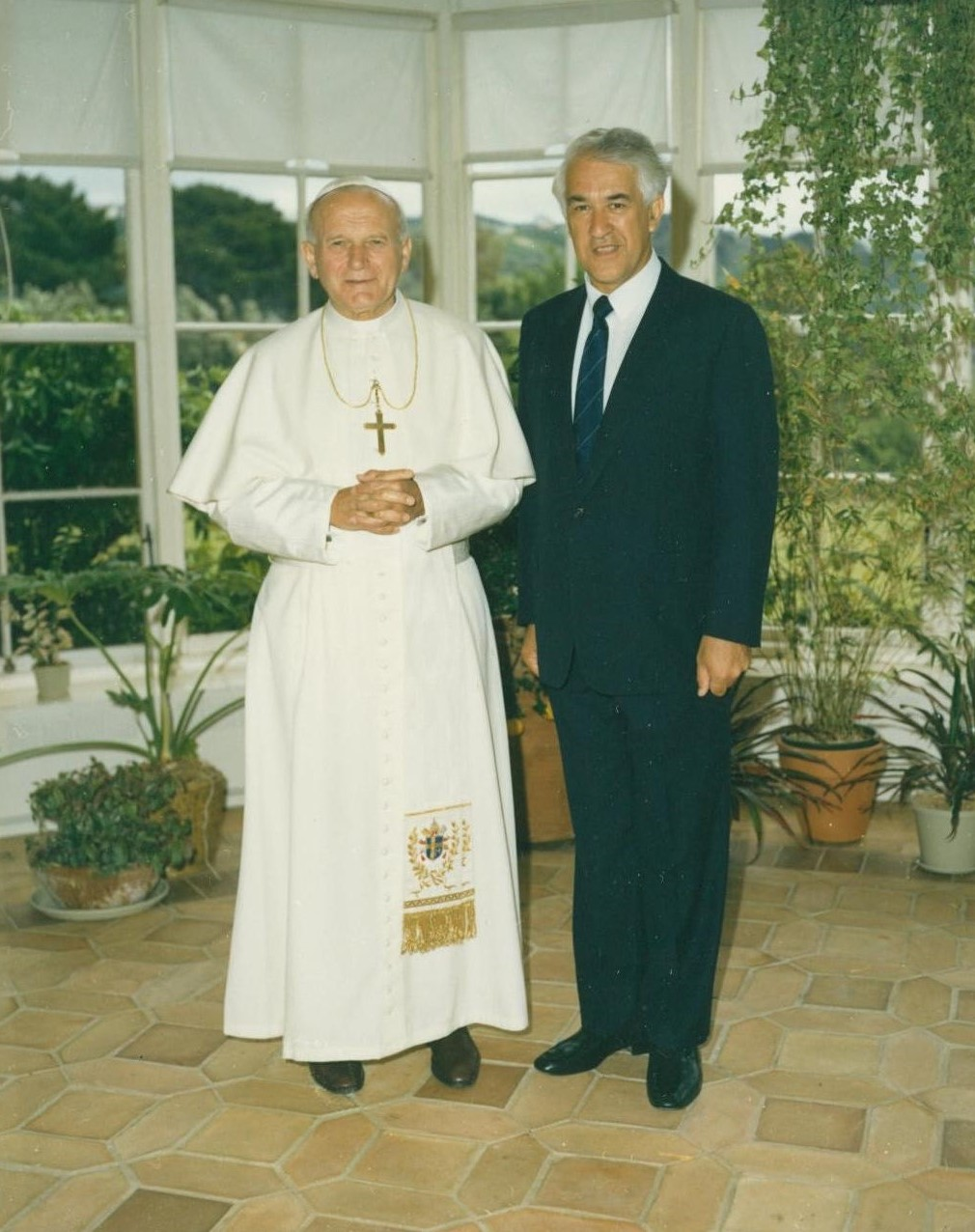
Reeves welcomes Pope John Paul II to New Zealand, at Government House, Wellington, on 23 November 1986

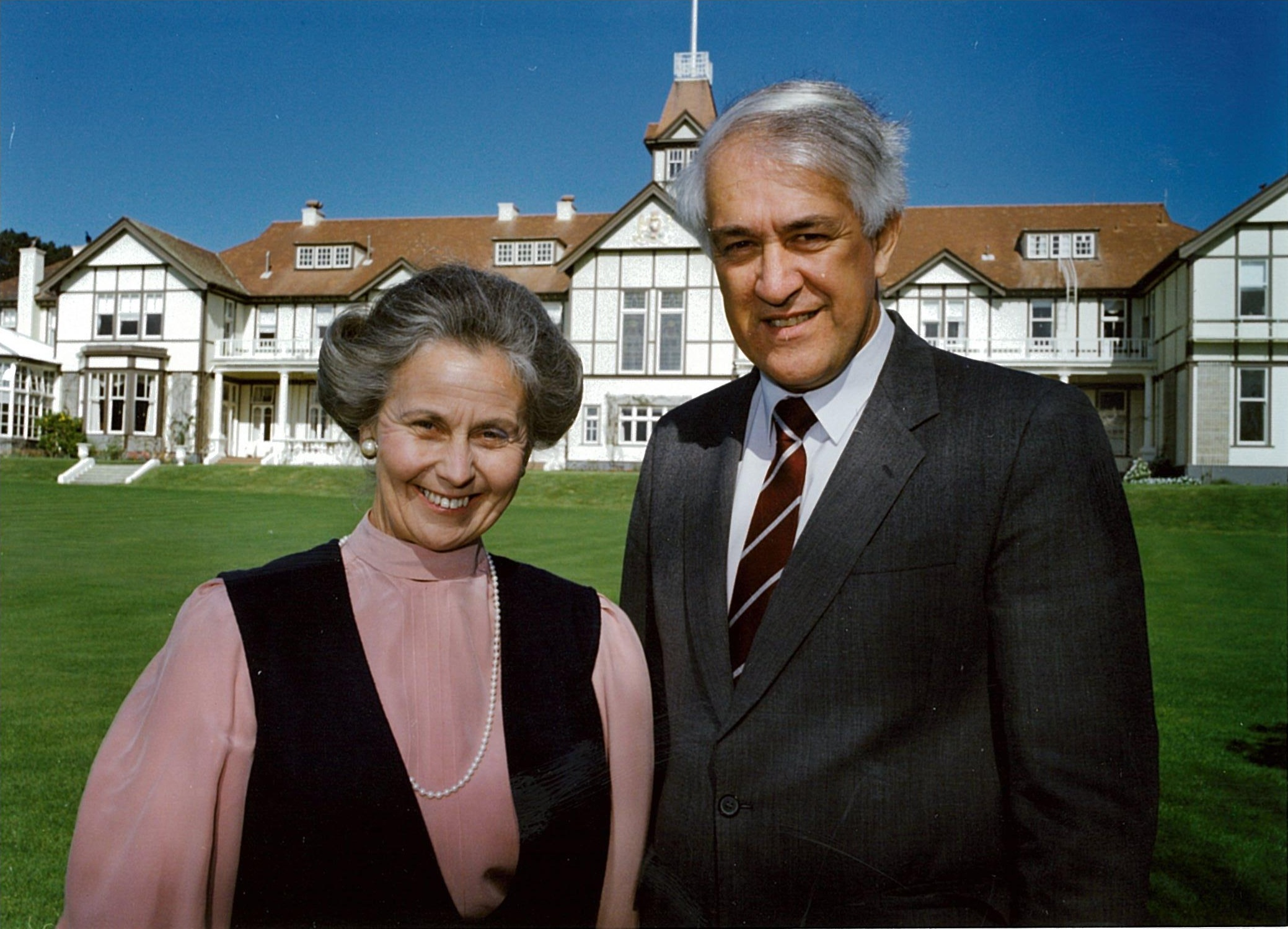
Reeves and his wife Beverley at Government House, Wellington

=== Appointment ===
On the advice of Prime Minister David Lange, Queen Elizabeth II appointed Reeves the 15th Governor-General of New Zealand effective from 20 November 1985. His appointment was met with some scepticism due to his previous political involvement in Citizens for Rowling, opposing the 1981 Springbok Tour, and the fact that he was an Anglican bishop. Leader of the Opposition Jim McLay opposed the appointment on these grounds, asking "How can an ordained priest fulfil that [constitutional] role?" Many Māori groups welcomed the appointment, with Sir James Henare arguing that "It must be a fruit of the Treaty of Waitangi to see a person from our people." He was the first (and up to the present the only) cleric to hold the post. Moreover, as a member of the Puketapu hapū of the Te Āti Awa of Taranaki, he was the first governor-general of Māori descent.

=== Tenure ===
As a clergyman, Reeves opted not to wear the military uniform of the governor-general. During his term, Reeves joined the Newtown Residents' Association, and invited members of that association to visit Government House, Wellington. He hosted the first open day at Government House on 7 October 1990, and employed the first public affairs officer, Cindy Beavis, to promote the governor-general's role.

Reeves remained in office until 20 November 1990. He was succeeded by Dame Catherine Tizard.

=== Controversies ===
During Reeves' tenure, the Fourth Labour Government made radical changes to the New Zealand economy, later known as Rogernomics. In November 1987 Reeves made comments critical of Rogernomics, stating that the reforms were creating "an increasingly stratified society". He was rebuked for these comments by Lange, but later stated in May 1988 "...the spirit of the market steals life from the vulnerable but the spirit of God gives life to all". Reeves later recalled that this marked a "parting of ways" with the government.

Reeves also recalled "I had a little sense of being left alone and felt that I needed to be taken into the loop more, or be taken seriously." Reeves wrote to the Queen, but did not receive replies directly from the Queen. He said, "I used to write to the Queen and express my opinion about this and that going on it [sic] the country and I wouldn't get a direct reply from her but I would always get a lengthy reply from her private secretary, which I took was expressing her viewpoint."

On a state visit to Vanuatu in 1988, Reeves was invited to kill a pig at a ceremony, creating controversy as he was patron of the Royal New Zealand Society for the Prevention of Cruelty to Animals. He later resigned as patron. This was followed by a similar incident when Reeves was a member of a party that shot an endangered bird during a trip to New Zealand's sub-Antarctic islands in December 1989. The bird was a light-mantled albatross and protected under the Wildlife Act 1953, however the Department of Conservation Southland operations manager Lou Sanson accepted that the shooting was accidental.

== Retirement ==
After his retirement from the viceregal office, Reeves became the Anglican Consultative Council Observer at the United Nations in New York (1991–93) and Assistant Bishop of New York (1991–94). From 1994 until 1995 he served briefly as Dean of Te Whare Wānanga o Te Rau Kahikatea (the theological college of Te Pihopatanga o Aotearoa, and a constituent member of St John's College, Auckland). He was also Deputy Leader of the Commonwealth Observer group to South Africa, Chair of the Nelson Mandela Foundation, and Visiting Montague Burton Professor of International Relations at the University of Edinburgh.

Reeves went on to chair the Fiji Constitution Review Commission from 1995 until 1997, culminating in Fiji's readmission to the Commonwealth, until its suspension in 2000. On 12 December 2007 it was reported that Reeves was involved with "secret talks" to resolve Fiji's year-long political crisis, following the 2006 Fijian coup d'état.

In 2004, Reeves made a statement in support of New Zealand republic, stating in an interview, "...if renouncing knighthoods was a prerequisite to being a citizen of a republic, I think it would be worth it."

Reeves served as the Chancellor of the Auckland University of Technology, from February 2005 until August 2011.

In July 2011, Reeves announced that he had been diagnosed with cancer, and therefore was retiring from all public responsibilities. He died from cancer on 14 August 2011, aged 78. A state funeral for Reeves took place on 18 August 2011, at Holy Trinity Cathedral in Auckland.

== Honours and other awards ==
Reeves was awarded the Queen Elizabeth II Silver Jubilee Medal (1977), he was appointed a Chaplain of the Most Venerable Order of the Hospital of Saint John of Jerusalem in April 1982, Knight Bachelor in the 1985 Queen's Birthday Honours, a Knight Grand Cross of the Order of St Michael and St George on 6 November 1985, a Knight of Justice of the Most Venerable Order of the Hospital of Saint John of Jerusalem in 1986, and a Knight Grand Cross of the Royal Victorian Order on 2 March 1986. In 1990, he became a Companion of the Queen's Service Order and was awarded the New Zealand 1990 Commemoration Medal. Reeves was also made a Companion of the Order of Fiji.

There was some concern regarding Reeves' using the title Sir, as members of the clergy in the Church of England do not usually receive this title when knighted, and the same rule presumably applied to the Anglican Church in New Zealand. Moreover, clergy are traditionally not dubbed. To avoid placing the Queen in an awkward situation (governors-general would by tradition be knighted by her in person at Buckingham Palace), the prime minister of the time, David Lange, made Reeves a Knight Bachelor before meeting her. Consequently, when Reeves went to receive the Knight Grand Cross of the Order of St Michael and St George from the Queen, he was already Sir Paul.

On Waitangi Day 2007 Reeves was awarded New Zealand's highest honour, being admitted to the Order of New Zealand.

The University of Oxford conferred on him the degree of Doctor of Civil Law in 1985 and his college, St Peter's, appointed him an Honorary Fellow in 1981 and a Trustee in 1994. A Fellowship of St John's College, Auckland followed in 1989. He has received other honorary degrees, including an LLD of Victoria University of Wellington (1989), a DD of the General Theological Seminary, New York (1992), and the degree of Doctor Honoris Causa of the University of Edinburgh (1994).

Changes to the rules in 2006 allowed him to use the style The Honourable for life.

== Arms ==
Coat of arms of Paul Reeves
| Notes The arms of Paul Reeves consist of: Crest Upon a helm with a wreath Argent and Azure a circlet of the Maori poutama stepped pattern, statant thereon a tui or parson bird (Prosthemadera novaseelandiae) Proper holding aloft in its dexter claw three feathers Argent their quills crossing in base. Escutcheon Per pale and per chevron embowed and enhanced Argent and Azure, three mitres (two and one) the infulae adorned with the Maori pitau kowhaiwhai pattern and three estoiles (one and two) all Counterchanged, in the fess point a royal crown and cap of estate Proper. Supporters On the dexter a brown kiwi (Apteryx australis) and sinister a kotuku or white heron (Egretta alba) beaks downward Proper each gorged with an ancient crown and supporting with the interior foot crozier Gold with the shaft adorned with the Maori pitau kowhaiwhai pattern Proper. Compartment A grassy mount with fern fronds growing therefrom Proper. Motto Whakarongo (Listen) |

Anglican Communion titles
| Preceded by Norman Lesser | Bishop of Waiapu; 1971–1979 | Succeeded by Ralph Matthews |
| Preceded by Eric Gowing | Bishop of Auckland; 1979–1985 | Succeeded by Bruce Gilberd |
| Preceded by Allen Johnston | Archbishop of New Zealand; 1980–1985 | Succeeded by Brian Davis |
Government offices
| Preceded by Sir David Beattie | Governor-General of New Zealand; 1985–1990 | Succeeded by Dame Catherine Tizard |
