= Matiaha Pahewa =

- Born: 1818; Tokomaru Bay, New Zealand
- Died: 5 June 1906 (aged 87–88); Tokomaru Bay
- Other names: Matthew or Matthias
- Occupations: Anglican Minister and Missionary
- Spouse: Hera Marokau

Matiaha Pahewa (1818–1906) was a teacher and missionary. Of Māori descent, he identified with the Ngāti Porou iwi (tribe). He was born in Tokomaru Bay, New Zealand, the son of Hone Te Pahewa and Te Pakou o Hinekau.

Pahewa attended the Waerenga-a-hika school at the mission of the Church Missionary Society (CMS), which had been established by the Rev. William Williams. On 4 October 1863 he was ordained as a deacon and he was assigned to the Diocese of Waiapu as the minita (minister) at Tokomaru. Tokomaru Pariha (parish) was established by Pahewa and the chief Henare Potae. It was the second Anglican parish established by the Ngati Porou. Hikurangi Pariha was established by the chief Ropata Wahawaha and Reverend Raniera Kawhia in 1860.

In 1865 there were fourteen clergymen – six European and eight Māori – in the Diocese of Waiapu. The Māori were: at Tokomaru, Matiaha Pahewa; at Wairoa, Tamihana Huata; at Turanga, Hare Tawhaa; at Waiapu, Rota Waitoa, Raniera Kawhia and Mohi Tūrei; at Table Cape, Watene Moeka; at Maketu, Ihaia Te Ahu.

By 1865 the Pai Mārire movement (commonly known as Hauhau) was active on the East Coast; at Tokomaru, Pahewa continued to visit the Hauhau as long as they were willing to accept his ministrations, although by so doing so he incurred the wrath of Henare Potae, who looked upon his action as identifying himself with their movement. On 13 July 1897, he together with Mohi Tūrei, Eruera Kawhia and Piripi Awarau, assisted the Rev. H. Williams in conducting the burial service for Ropata Wahawaha, who had fought the Hauhau.

Pahewa undertook theological study at St. Stephen's College in Auckland. On 22 September 1878 he was ordained as a priest by Bishop Edward Stuart and was assigned to the Diocese of Waiapu.

He remained at Tokomaru Bay until his death on 5 June 1906.

His son was the Rev. Hakaraia Pahewa (c.1871 – 1949), who was appointed to the Diocese of Waiapu in Te Kaha Maori District, which was on the road from Ōpōtiki to East Cape. In 1918 he became the first Māori to be appointed as a Canon, when he was appointed that position at Napier Cathedral.
