= Mohi Tūrei =

Ngati Porou leader, minister of religion, carver, composer of haka

- Born: c.1829 Te Kautuku near Rangitukia, East Cape, New Zealand
- Died: 2 March 1914; Rangitukia
- Occupations: Anglican minister and Missionary
- Spouses: Meri Awhina-A-Te-Rangi; Kararaina Korimete

Mohi Tūrei (c. 1829 – 2 March 1914) was a notable New Zealand tribal leader, minister of religion, orator and composer of haka. Of Māori descent, he identified with the Ngāti Porou iwi. He was the only child of Te Omanga Tūrei of Ngāti Hokupu hapū and Makere Tangikuku of Te Aitanga‐a‐Mate hapū.

He was an accomplished carver including working on the Hinerupe meeting house (Wharenui) at Te Araroa, the interior carvings of Ohinewaiapu Marae. While Turei embraced Christianity, he acquired an understanding of old Maori religion and traditional learning from Pita Kapiti, a tohunga, at Te Tapere-Nui-ā-Whatonga.

He spent his childhood at Te Kautuku near Rangitukia near the mouth of the Waiapu River. By 1839, a school was opened at Rangitukia, which Tueri is believed to have attended. He later attended the Waerenga-ā-hika school at the mission of the Church Missionary Society (CMS), which had been established by the Rev. William Williams in the Gisborne area.

Tūeri attended the first synod of the Diocese of Waiapu at Waerenga-ā-hika on 3 December 1861. He undertook theological study at St. Stephen's College in Auckland. He was appointed a deacon on 25 September 1864 and appointed as the first minita (minister) at Waiapū Pariha (parish), which was the third Anglican parish established by the Ngati Porou. Hikurangi Pariha was established by the chief Ropata Wahawaha and Reverend Raniera Kawhia in 1860 and Tokomaru Pariha was established by the chief Henare Potae and Reverend Matiaha Pahewa in 1863. In 1865 there were fourteen clergymen - six European and eight Māori - in the Diocese of Waiapu. The Māori were: at Tokomaru, Matiaha Pahewa; at Wairoa, Tamihana Huata; at Turanga, Hare Tawhaa; at Waiapu, Rota Waitoa, Raniera Kawhia and Mohi Turei; at Table Cape, Watene Moeka; at Maketu, Ihaia Te Ahu.

The Waiapu Maori Church, representing the district from Hicks Bay to Table Cape (Kahutara Point), Māhia Peninsula, met at Turanganui on 30 October 1870. There were eight clergymen present, seven of whom were Māori, as well as Māori laymen. William Williams, who had been appointed the Bishop of Waiapū, ordained Tūrei, and Hare Tawhaa of Turanganui, as priests, and Wi Paraire of Hicks Bay and Hone Pohutu, as deacons.

Tūrei opposed the Pai Mārire movement (commonly known as Hauhau) when its missionaries were active on the East Coast by 1865. Tūrei accompanied the Ngati Porou warriors who defeated the Hauhau forces at Waerenga-ā-hika in November 1865. On 13 July 1897, Tūrei together with Matiaha Pahewa, Eruera Kawhia and Piripi Awarau, assisted the Rev. H. Williams in conducting the burial service for Ropata Wahawaha, who had fought the Hauhau.

In 1904 Tūrei was appointed the first vicar of Waiapū. He supervised the building of the second St John's Church, to replace the church that was burnt by the Hauhau. He was the minister at Rangitukia until 1909, when he retired as he had become bed-ridden with paralysis.
