= Leonard Williams (bishop) =

New Zealand Anglican bishop (1829–1916)

The Right Reverend William Leonard Williams
- Bishop of Waiapu
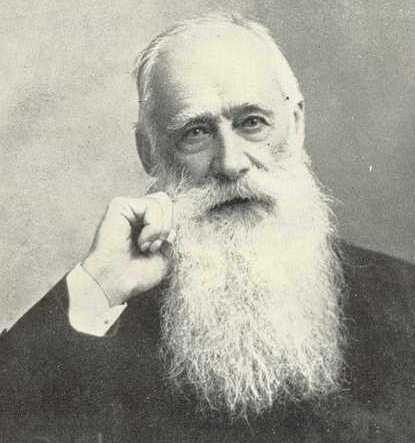
- Bishop William Leonard Williams
- Province: East Coast of the North Island of New Zealand
- Diocese: Anglican Diocese of Waiapu
- Predecessor: Edward Stuart

Personal details
- Born: William Leonard Williams; 22 July 1829 Paihia, New Zealand
- Died: 24 August 1916 (aged 87) Napier, New Zealand
- Spouse: Sarah Wanklyn
- Occupation: Anglican bishop

William Leonard Williams (1829–1916) was an Anglican bishop of Waiapu. He was regarded as an eminent scholar of the Māori language. His father, William Williams, was the first Bishop of Waiapu, Williams was the third bishop, and his son, Herbert Williams, was the sixth bishop of Waiapu.

== Early life ==
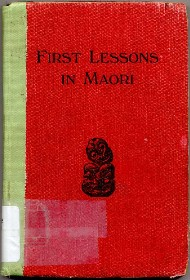
A 1930 publication of his book

Williams was born on the 22 July 1829 at Paihia, Bay of Islands, New Zealand. He was the third child and first son of William Williams, of the Church Missionary Society (CMS), and his wife, Jane.

Williams was educated in New Zealand before attending Magdelen Hall (now Hertford College, Oxford) from 1847 where he obtained a third class honours degree in June 1852. He became a member of the CMS and undertook theological training at the Church Missionary Society College, Islington. He was admitted to Deacon's Orders by the Bishop of London on 22 March 1853.

Williams met the daughters of Mr. J. B. Wanklyn of Halecat, Witherslack, Cumbria when visiting his aunt, Catherine Heathcote, at Southwell, Nottinghamshire. They had been pupils at Catherine Heathcote's School. In the following year he married Sarah Wanklyn at St Paul's Church, Witherslack on 6 June 1853, and both set sail in August on a five-month journey to New Zealand.

== Mission at Waerenga-ā-hika ==
Williams assisted his father as a tutor in the school at Waerenga-ā-hika. In 1862 Leonard was appointed to be Archdeacon of Waiapu. The First Taranaki War, from March 1860 until 1862 resulted in the East Cape and Poverty Bay area became increasingly unsettled. A ‘repudiationist’ movement developed in Poverty Bay. The Ngāti Kaipoho chief Raharuhi told Governor Thomas Gore Browne that the Māori did not recognise Queen Victoria's claim to rule over them and that the lands which the settlers in Poverty Bay had obtained should be returned.

The Pai Mārire (Hauhau) moved into Poverty Bay in March 1865. The Poverty Bay Māori were neither for nor against the Hauhau. While the Rongowhakaata iwi defended the mission, William Williams lost confidence in the security of the mission when some chiefs provided support for the Hauhau and went to the Bay of Islands with his wife and daughters. However Leonard remained at the mission.

The mission at Waerenga-ā-hika became a battle ground and the buildings were destroyed. After the Hauhau were defeated the Māori in the Poverty Bay had a much reduced support for the Christian faith, although it was sustained where there were CMS missionaries and Māori clergymen.

After 1868, many Māori of the Urewera and Poverty Bay regions adopted the Ringatū religion, which was framed in language taken from the Old Testament. Leonard Williams, travelled through the Ngāi Tūhoe country in 1878. He commented on the Ringatū religion: “Their manner was reverent and the petitions contained in their prayers were framed in language taken from the Old Testament, but the obvious objection to the whole system was that it was anti-Christian, being a deliberate rejection of all that the love of God has provided for sinners in Jesus Christ.”

== Te Rau Kahikatea Theological College ==
In 1870 Williams, purchased land in Gisborne where he built Te Rau Kahikatea, which was his family home from 1877 until 1894. In nearly buildings he established Te Rau Kahikatea Theological College for Māori clergymen, which accepted students from 1883. Samuel Williams was the tutor in 1883 and Alfred Owen Williams became the tutor from 1883 to 1885. The students included Hone Tana Papahia and Hone Waitoa (the son of the Rev. Rota Waitoa).

Williams was the principal of the college from 1885 to 1894, and his son, Herbert Williams was a tutor from 1889 to 1894, vice-principal in 1894, and principal from 1894 to 1902. Rēweti Kōhere was assistant tutor from 1898 to 1908. Frederick William Chatterton was the principal from 1902 to 1918. Alfred Nield was the principal from 1919 to 1920, when the college in Gisborne was closed and the students moved to St John's College, Auckland.

In the 1992 changes to the organisation of St John's College, Te Whare Wānanga o Te Rau Kahikatea (The Theological College of Te Pihopatanga o Aotearoa) was re-established as part of the college.

== Bishop of Waiapu ==
Williams was elected the third Bishop of Waiapu by the Diocesan Synod on 25 September 1894, and was consecrated in the Napier Cathedral on 20 January 1895. He would travel on horseback around his diocese accompanied by two assistants. Williams retired in 1909 when he found the job too difficult; although he continued to acted as the President of the New Zealand Church Missionary Association, which was formed in 1892. He died at his home in Napier in 1916.

== Publications ==
Williams was a scholar of Māori language and culture. During his lifetime he reissued his father's publication, A dictionary of the New Zealand language twice, as well as publishing his own book introducing the Māori language and contributing to the study of New Zealand plants. The dictionary was again reissued by his son, the Rt Revd Herbert Williams, who also followed Williams and his father as a bishop of the Waiapu diocese.

Religious titles
Preceded by Edward Stuart	Bishop of Waiapu; 1895–1909	Succeeded by Alfred Averill
