= Tāmihana Huata =

New Zealand teacher and missionary

- Born: 1821; Frasertown, New Zealand
- Died: 1908 (aged 86–87); Wairoa
- Occupations: Anglican Minister and Missionary
- Spouse: Ripeka

Tāmihana Huata (c. 1821–1908) was a notable New Zealand teacher and missionary. Of Māori descent, he identified with the Ngāti Mihi and Ngāti Kahungunu iwi (tribe). He was born in Frasertown, near Wairoa, Hawke's Bay.

== Church Missionary Society (CMS) ==
In 1844, James Hamlin, of the Church Missionary Society (CMS), was ordained a deacon and sent to Wairoa. The chiefs of Te Wai-roa district, Pitiera Kopu and Paora Te Apatu, choose Huata to be their leader in the worship of Christianity. From 1856 he attended the Waerenga-a-hika school at the mission of the CMS which had been established by the Rev. William Williams. On 22 September 1861 he was ordained as a deacon by Bishop Williams and he was assigned to the Diocese of Waiapu. He undertook theological study at St. Stephen’s College in Auckland. On 25 September 1864, he was ordained as a priest. He worked as the assistant to the Rev. Hamlin until 1864, then he became the principal minister at Wairoa. In 1865, there were fourteen clergymen - six European and eight Māori - in the Diocese of Waiapu. The Māori were: at Tokomaru, Matiaha Pahewa; at Wairoa, Tāmihana Huata; at Turanga, Hare Tawhaa; at Waiapu, Rota Waitoa, Raniera Kawhia and Mohi Tūrei; at Table Cape, Watene Moeka; at Maketu, Ihaia Te Ahu.

Huata opposed the Pai Mārire movement (commonly known as Hauhau) when its missionaries were active on the East Coast by 1865. In July 1868, Te Kooti and a band of Hauhau escaped from the Chatham Islands and returned to the East Coast and fighting began all over again. In 1868, Huata was located at Mohaka.

Huata became a person of influence and he settled a quarrel between the sub-tribes, Ngāti-Puku and Ngāti-Iwikatea, over the boundaries of land known as Te Wharepu Block. Huata, assisted by some of the chiefs, intervened and stopped the fighting. He continued to work in the Wairoa district until he retired in 1906.

== Family ==
He was the father of the Rev. Hēmi Pītiti Huata, who was ordained as a priest in 1898 and succeeded his father as the vicar at Frasertown. His grandson, the Rev. Wiremu Te Tau Huata, was chaplain to the 28th New Zealand (Maori) Battalion, who was awarded the Military Cross for his service in Italy during World War II.
