= Vincent Gerard (bishop) =

Bishop of Waiapu; British Anglican bishop in New Zealand

George Vincent Gerard, CBE, MC (24 November 1898 – 14 January 1984) was the seventh Anglican Bishop of Waiapu, serving from 1938 to 1944; and Assistant Bishop of Sheffield, 1947–1971. He served with distinction in both World Wars.

== Early life and education ==
Gerard was educated at Christ's College, Christchurch. He came to England in 1917 and joined the Inns of Court Regiment and was soon offered a commission with the East Kents (the Buffs). He served in France and earned a Military Cross. Gerard then obtained a degree at Brasenose College, Oxford and was ordained in 1923.

== Ministry ==
He returned to New Zealand and embarked on his ecclesiastical career with a curacy in Timaru. He was made deacon on 21 December 1922 and ordained priest on 23 December 1923, by Churchill Julius, Bishop of Christchurch and Primate of New Zealand, at ChristChurch Cathedral. Later he was Vicar of Pahiatua, then Petone, and finally (before his appointment to the episcopate) of St Matthew, Auckland.

Gerard was elected Bishop of Waiapu and consecrated a bishop on 28 October 1938, by Alfred Averill, Primate of New Zealand and Bishop of Auckland, at Napier Cathedral. He served as Senior Chaplain to the New Zealand forces when the Second World War broke out but was taken prisoner in 1941 and repatriated in 1943. He was appointed CBE in 1944 and resigned his See on 30 April that year. He was then Senior NZ Chaplain in the South Pacific until the War ended.

By 1945 Gerard had renewed his acquaintance with Leslie Hunter, by then Bishop of Sheffield, with whom he had worked in Barking in the 1920s. Gerard was appointed vicar and rural dean of Rotherham that year and, in 1947, Assistant Bishop of Sheffield. He became 'a loved and honoured figure throughout the diocese'. Gerard resigned the vicarage and deanery in 1960, but remained Assistant Bishop until 30 September 1971 and was Chairman of the Church Assembly's House of Clergy, from 1965 to 1970. He died in 1984.

Religious titles
Preceded by Herbert Williams	Bishop of Waiapu; 1938–1944	Succeeded by George Cruickshank
