= Diocese of San Joaquin =

Diocese of San Joaquin may refer to:

- Anglican Diocese of San Joaquin (part of the Anglican Church in North America)
- Episcopal Diocese of San Joaquin (part of the Episcopal Church in the United States of America)
