= Herbert Williams (bishop) =

Sixth Anglican Bishop of Waiapu and Māori language scholar

The Right Reverend Herbert Williams FRS
- Bishop of Waiapu
- Province: East Coast, New Zealand
- Diocese: Anglican Diocese of Waiapu
- Predecessor: William Sedgwick

Personal details
- Born: Herbert William Williams; 10 October 1860 Gisborne, New Zealand
- Died: 7 December 1937 (aged 77) Napier, New Zealand
- Denomination: Anglicanism
- Parents: Leonard Williams and Sarah Wanklyn
- Spouse: Bertha Louise Gertrude Mason
- Education: Christ's College, Christchurch; The University of New Zealand; Jesus College, Cambridge

Herbert William Williams FRS (10 October 1860 – 7 December 1937) was the 6th Anglican Bishop of Waiapu and a distinguished scholar of the Māori language.

Williams was born at Waerenga-ā-Hika, Gisborne, New Zealand, the son of Sarah Williams and Leonard Williams. He was educated at Christ's College, Christchurch, The University of New Zealand and Jesus College, Cambridge; graduating Bachelor of Arts (BA) in 1884. He was ordained in 1886, then embarked on his ecclesiastical career with a curacy at West Wratting, Cambridge diocese, Ely from 1886-1888. Williams married Bertha Mason on 27 September 1888 in Edinburgh, Scotland. Their children include Nigel Williams (a priest; 23 March 1901 – 25 July 1980).

He was a member of the Church Missionary Society (CMS). From March 1890 to 1894 he was a tutor at Te Rau Kahikatea Theological College, which had been established in Gisborne by his father, Leonard Williams. He became the vice-principal in 1894, and from 1894 to 1902 he was the principal of the college. He was appointed as the Superintendent of the Missionary East Coast District. He established Te Rau Press, which published religious texts including Maramataka, a lectionary, from 1899 to 1921.

From 1907 to 1930 he was Archdeacon of Waiapu. In that year he followed in the footsteps of his grandfather (William Williams, the first Bishop of Waiapu) and his father (Leonard Williams, the third) and was appointed to the episcopate, at Waiapu Cathedral.

Williams campaigned with Āpirana Ngata for the recognition of Māori language as a subject for study in the University of New Zealand, with the study of Māori becoming eligible for a degree of bachelor of arts in 1928. In 1917 Williams published the fifth edition of A dictionary of the New Zealand language, which updated the work of his father and grandfather. Williams received honorary doctorates in literature from the Universities of New Zealand (1924) and Cambridge (1925). In 1923 he was made a Fellow of the Royal Society of New Zealand and he was the president of the Royal Society of New Zealand from 1935 to 1936, and president of the Polynesian Society from 1929 until his death.

Anglican Communion titles
Preceded by William Sedgwick	Bishop of Waiapu; 1930–1937	Succeeded by George Gerard
