= John-David Schofield =

American bishop (1938-2013)

The Right Reverend John-David Schofield
- IV Bishop of San Joaquin
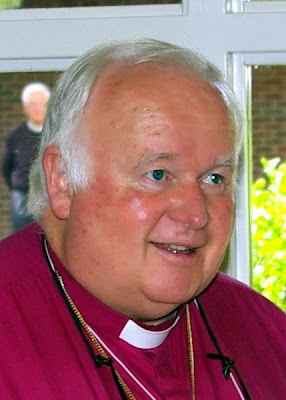
- Church: Anglican Church in North America
- Diocese: San Joaquin
- In office: 2009–2011
- Predecessor: none
- Successor: Eric Menees

Orders
- Consecration: 1988

Personal details
- Born: 6 October 1938
- Died: 29 October 2013 (aged 75) Fresno

John-David Mercer Schofield (October 6, 1938 – October 29, 2013) was fourth bishop of the Episcopal Diocese of San Joaquin and later a bishop-in-residence in the Anglican Church in North America (ACNA).

Schofield was the rector of St. Columba's Inverness in the Episcopal Diocese of California. He served as the fourth bishop of the Episcopal Diocese of San Joaquin, from October 9, 1988, to October 22, 2011, when the diocese was part of the Episcopal Church. In 2007, due to theological disagreements, Schofield led the majority of the diocese to join the Anglican Church of the Southern Cone and become the Anglican Diocese of San Joaquin. The diocese was a founding member of the Anglican Church in North America in June 2009. He served as the first bishop of the Anglican Diocese of San Joaquin until his retirement in 2011, remaining as bishop-in-residence until his death.

Schofield died in Fresno on October 29, 2013, aged 75 years old.

== Notes ==
Anglican Communion titles
Preceded by Victor Manuel Rivera	IV Bishop of San Joaquin; 1988–2007	Succeeded by Jerry Lamb provisional David Rice diocesan
Preceded by Victor Manuel Rivera	IV Bishop of San Joaquin; 1988–2011	Succeeded by Eric Menees
