= Hone Tana Papahia =

New Zealand clergy and missionary (1856–1912)

- Born: 1856; Orongotea, on the north-west shore of the Hokianga Harbour, New Zealand
- Died: 9 February 1912 (aged 55–56); Hokianga, New Zealand
- Occupation: Missionary

Hone Tana Papahia (1856 – 9 February 1912) was a New Zealand Anglican clergyman, missionary. Of Māori descent, he identified with the Ngāpuhi iwi and Te Horohuhare and Ngati Haua hapū of Te Rarawa iwi. He was the son of Wiremu Tana Papahia. He was born in Ōrongotea on the north-west shore of the Hokianga Harbour in about 1856.

He attended the native teachers' institute at the Kaitaia Mission of the Church Missionary Society (CMS), where he was trained by the Rev. Joseph Matthews. From 1885 to 1887 he attended Te Rau Kahikatea Theological College at Gisborne, where he studied under the Rev. William Leonard, and his nephew the Rev. Alfred Owen Williams, both members of the CMS.

On 27 March 1887 in St George's Church at Thames, Papahia was admitted as a deacon by the Bishop of Auckland, William Cowie. From 28 March 1887 to 1905 he worked as a missionary to the Māori in the Waiparera district from Hokianga to Ahipara. On 10 January 1892 he was appointed a priest. From 1894 to 1903 he was the chaplain to Bishop Cowie and then his successor Bishop Neligan from 1903 to 1911. He was also appointed in 1905 as the assistant to the Archdeacon Hector Alfred Hawkins, the superintendent of the Māori Mission of the Auckland Diocese.
