= Walter Averill =

New Zealand priest (1895–1955)

Walter Wootton Averill (12 May 1895 – 18 November 1955) was an eminent Anglican priest in the mid-twentieth century New Zealand.

The eldest son of Alfred Averill, Archbishop of New Zealand, Walter was born at Christchurch, and became elder brother to Leslie Averill. He was educated at Christ's College, Christchurch, and trained for the ministry (with an interruption during the Great War) at St John's College, Auckland (gaining a University of New Zealand degree).

He was made deacon on 21 December 1923 and ordained priest on 21 December 1924, both times by his father, at Auckland. After a curacy in Cambridge he held incumbencies at Hauraki Plains (1926–1928), Ponsonby (2 February 1928 – 1945), Timaru (21 March 1945 – 1953) and Merivale (until his death). While at Ponsonby, he was also appointed a Canon of the cathedral and archdeacon (from 1938); in Timaru he became (additionally) Archdeacon of Timaru on 27 April 1945, holding that post until his arrival at Merivale.
