= Jenny Dawson =

Anglican priest

Jenny Dawson is an Anglican priest.

She was educated at the Universities of Canterbury Otago, and the University of Divinity Melbourne. She was [[Ministry Educator in Christchurch Diocese, then Archdeacon]] of Kāpiti from 2008 until 2011 when she became Chaplain to the Bishop of Waiapu. In 2015 returned to Wellington.
