= Rota Waitoa =

First New Zealand Māori Anglican Clergy

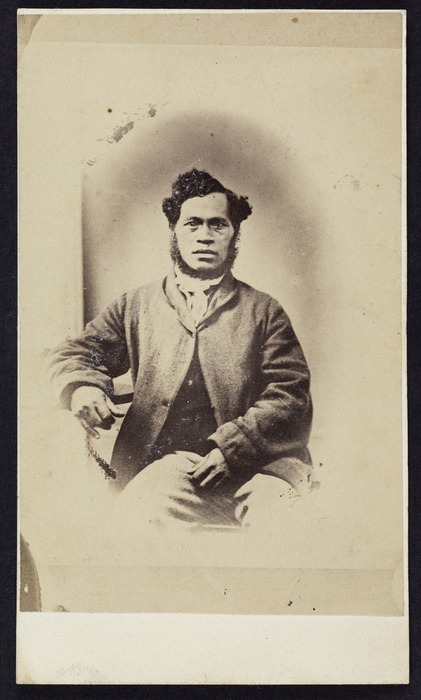
- Waitoa, taken between ca 1850 and 1866.
- Born: Waitoa, Waikato, New Zealand
- Died: 22 July 1866; Auckland, New Zealand
- Other name: Lot
- Occupations: Anglican minister and Missionary
- Spouse(s): Te Rina Hinehuka (married 1848, died c1857); Tiarete Harata Gerald (married c1858)
- Relatives: Rev. Hone Waitoa (son)

Rota Waitoa (? – 22 July 1866) was a New Zealand Anglican clergyman, of Māori descent. Waitoa identified with the Ngāti Raukawa iwi. He was born in Waitoa, Waikato, New Zealand. Waitoa's ordination as deacon at St Paul's, Auckland, on 22 May 1853, was the first ordination of a Māori into the Anglican church.

He was baptised Rota (Lot) on 17 October 1841 by the Rev. Octavius Hadfield at the Waikanae Mission of the Church Missionary Society (CMS). When Bishop George Selwyn visited in November 1842 Waitoa volunteered to accompany him on his journey back to the Te Waimate mission.

From 1843 he attended St John’s College at Te Waimate mission and then in Auckland when Bishop Selwyn moved St John’s College to West Tamaki. He became master of the junior department of the Māori boys' school and a catechist.

In 1848 he was stationed at Te Kawakawa (Te Araroa), East Cape. Iharaira Te Houkāmau opposed his appointment because he considered it an insult to his dignity to have a Māori catechist whose people he looked upon as bitter enemies. However Te Houkamau eventually accepted Waitoa and Te Houkamau offered himself as a candidate for baptism.

Waitoa was ordained as a deacon at St Paul's Church, Auckland, on 22 May 1853 and was licensed to the mission district of Te Kawakawa. He was ordained a priest on 4 March 1860 by Bishop William Williams, and appointed to Te Kawakawa. Raniera Kawhia joined Waitoa at Te Kawakawa after he was ordained deacon in February 1860.

In 1865 there were fourteen clergymen – six European and eight Māori – in the Diocese of Waiapu. The Māori were: at Tokomaru, Matiaha Pahewa; at Wairoa, Tamihana Huata; at Turanga, Hare Tawhaa; at Waiapu, Rota Waitoa, Raniera Kawhia and Mohi Tūrei; at Table Cape, Watene Moeka; at Maketu, Ihaia Te Ahu.

Waitoa opposed the Māori King Movement, which was a means of attaining Māori unity to halt the alienation of land at a time of rapid population growth by European colonists. He also opposed the Pai Mārire movement (commonly known as Hauhau) when it gained influence in the East Coast, and in 1865–66 he was forced to abandon Te Kawakawa mission for a short period of time. In 1865 Waitoa was at Waiapū.

In 1866 he suffered a fall from a horse. Waitoa died on 22 July 1866 and was buried at St Stephen's cemetery, Judges Bay, Auckland.
