= Iharaira Te Houkāmau =

New Zealand Māori leader

Iharaira Te Houkāmau (?–1875) was a notable New Zealand tribal leader. Of Māori descent, he identified with the Ngāti Porou iwi.

Following the signing of the Treaty of Waitangi (te Tiriti), Henry Williams arrived in Poverty Bay on 8 April 1840 on the ship Ariel with a Māori-language copy of te Tiriti ('Tūranga Treaty copy'). Between 5 May and 9 June 1840, William Williams, presented the Tūranga Treaty copy to rangatira at Tūranga, Uawa, Wakawitirā, Rangitukia and Tokomaru so that those East Coast chiefs could sign; 41 signatures appear on the Tūranga Treaty copy, a number of important rangatira refused to sign, including Te Kani a Takirau of Uawa and Te Houkamau.

Te Houkāmau opposed the appointment of Revd Rota Waitoa to Te Kawakawa (Te Araroa) in 1848, because he considered it an insult to his dignity to have a Māori deacon whose people he looked upon as bitter enemies. However Te Houkamau eventually accepted Waitoa and Te Houkamau offered himself as a candidate for baptism. To show his penitence, Te Houkamau begged Waitoa to appoint him “church sweeper and bellringer to the House of the Lord.”
