= William Williams (bishop) =

Anglican Bishop of Waiapu (1800–1878)

The Right Reverend William Williams
- Bishop of Waiapu
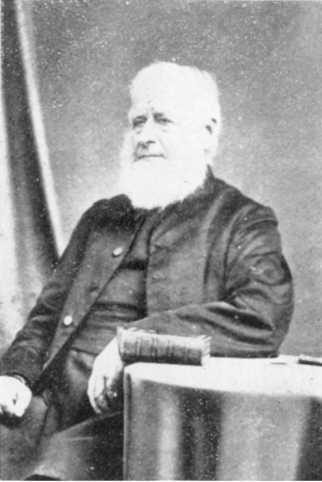
- Bishop William Williams
- Province: East Coast of the North Island of New Zealand
- Diocese: Anglican Diocese of Waiapu

Personal details
- Born: 18 July 1800 Nottingham, England
- Died: 9 February 1878 (aged 77) Napier, New Zealand
- Spouse: Jane Williams (née Nelson)
- Occupation: Anglican Bishop and Missionary

To be distinguished from William Williams (missionary) (1859–1892) in Khasi Hills India

William Williams (18 July 1800 – 9 February 1878) was consecrated as the first Anglican Bishop of Waiapu, New Zealand, on 3 April 1859 by the General Synod at Wellington. His son, Leonard Williams became the third Bishop of Waiapu and his grandson, Herbert Williams, the sixth. His brother, the Rev. Henry Williams, led the Church Missionary Society (CMS) mission in New Zealand. William Williams led the CMS missionaries in translating the Bible into Māori and published an early dictionary and grammar of the Māori language.

== Early life ==
Williams was born in Nottingham to Thomas and Mary Williams on 18 July 1800. His paternal grandfather was the Reverend Thomas Williams (1725–1770), a Congregational minister at the Independent Chapel of Gosport.

After the death of William's father in 1804, his mother moved with her younger children to Southwell, Nottinghamshire, where she opened a school for young girls. William Williams was educated at Moravian school, Fairfield, Manchester, then at Southwell Grammar School under the Rev. E. Footit, before completing an apprenticeship to a Southwell surgeon named Forster.

Williams was influenced by the Rev. Edward Garrard Marsh to become an Anglican in February 1818 and then to join the Church Missionary Society (CMS).

Williams entered Magdalen Hall (later Hertford College, Oxford), in 1822 as a prospective CMS trainee. He left Oxford in 1824 with a BA in classics. On 26 September 1824 he was ordained a deacon of the (Anglican) Church of England. In 1825 he entered the Church Missionary Society College, Islington, with the intention of following his brother, the Rev. Henry Williams, to New Zealand.

On 11 July 1825, Williams married Jane Nelson of Newark-on-Trent, Nottinghamshire, a teacher at his mother's school. On 12 August they embarked on Sir George Osborne to sail to Sydney, Australia, then on to Paihia, Bay of Islands, where they arrived on 25 March 1826.

Williams and his wife had nine children:

- Mary, born 12 April 1826; married Samuel Williams
- Jane Elizabeth, born 23 October 1827; married Henry (Harry) Williams
- William Leonard, born 22 July 1829
- Thomas Sydney, born 9 February 1831
- James Nelson, born 22 August 1837
- Anna Maria, born 25 February 1839
- Lydia Catherine, born 7 April 1841
- Marianna, born 22 August 1843
- Emma Caroline, born 20 February 1846

Williams' third child and eldest son, Leonard, after completing his university education at the University of Oxford then being ordained, worked with Williams in the Waiapu diocese. In 1862 Leonard Williams was appointed to be Archdeacon of Waiapu. In 1895 Leonard Williams became the third Bishop of Waiapu.

== Paihia Mission and the translation of the Bible into Māori ==
On his arrival in Paihia, Williams became a teacher of the boys at the school for children of CMS families.

Williams had a talent for the study of the Māori language and lead a committee of members of the CMS in translating the Bible into Māori. After 1826 he took over responsibility for leading the CMS missionaries in further translation of the Bible and other Christian literature. In July 1827 the first Māori Bible was printed comprising three chapters of Genesis, the 20th chapter of Exodus, the first chapter of the Gospel of St John, 30 verses of the 5th chapter of the Gospel of St Matthew, the Lord's Prayer and some hymns. In 1833 further parts of the Maori Bible were published. The Church Missionary Press was established in Paihia.

After 1844 the Rev. Robert Maunsell also worked with Williams on the translation of the Bible. Williams concentrated on the New Testament and Maunsell worked on the Old Testament, portions of which were published in 1840 with the full translation completed in 1857. William Gilbert Puckey also collaborated with Williams on the translation of the New Testament, which was published in 1837 and its revision in 1844.

Williams published the Dictionary of the New Zealand Language and a Concise Grammar in 1844.

== Journeys to the East Cape, Thames and Waikato ==
In April 1833, seven Ngāti Porou men and five women arrived in the Bay of Island on the whaler Elizabeth. They had been made prisoner when the captain of the whaler left Waiapu (the locality of the present day town of Ruatoria) after a confrontation with the Ngāti Porou. In the Bay of Islands they were delivered to Ngāpuhi chiefs to become slaves. Williams, his brother Henry and Alfred Nesbit Brown persuaded the Ngāpuhi to give up the slaves. An attempt was made to return them on the schooner Active, but a gale defeated that attempt. They returned to the Bay of Islands, where they received religious instruction until the following summer.

In January 1834 the schooner Fortitude carried the timber frame for a house so that James Preece, his wife and John Morgan could establish the Puriri mission. The Fortitude then carried William Williams, William Yate and the Ngāti Porou to the East Cape. Between July and November 1834, Williams and Alfred Nesbit Brown walked through the Thames and Waikato regions.

In January 1838, he walked from East Cape to Tūranga, Poverty Bay with William Colenso, Richard Matthews and James Stack. Williams returned to the East Coast with Richard Taylor from March to May 1839. These journeys convinced Williams of the need to establish a CMS mission on the East Coast, in the Gisborne area. During these journeys Williams found that Māori Christian teachers had started a school at Rangitukia and a chapel at Whakawhitirā. He chose land for a house at the Ngāti Kaipoho pā of Umukapua, near Tūranga.

== Waimate Mission ==
In 1834, Williams was appointed to St. John the Baptist Church at Te Waimate mission. On 23 and 24 December 1835 Charles Darwin visited while HMS Beagle spent 10 days in the Bay of Islands. However, following the publication of On the Origin of Species, Williams described Darwinism as a denial of "the work of an almighty creator".

== Tūranga and Waerenga-ā-hika, Poverty Bay Mission ==
Williams and his family arrived at Tūranga, Poverty Bay on 20 January 1840. The first mission station was built on the banks of the Waipaoa River and was named Kaupapa (to plan; first stage or step). The schools run by William and Jane were well attended, the school opened with five classes for men, two classes for women and classes for boys. Classes covered practical knowledge as well as the teaching of the Scriptures. By 1 July 1841, 622 adults had been baptised with about 1,300 also receiving instruction towards baptism, and congregations averaging around 1,800.

James Stack had been a Wesleyan missionary at Kaeo; then later joined the Church Missionary Society. In 1839 James Stack and his wife Mary joined William Williams at the mission station at Tūranga and later set up a mission at Rangitukia (1842–1847). By 1840 there were about 20 Māori religious teachers in the East Cape and Poverty Bay districts, one of these was Anaru Matete from Rongowhakaata who was thought to have helped Williams set up the Tūranga Church Missionary Society station.

George Augustus Selwyn, the first Anglican bishop of New Zealand, appointed Williams as Archdeacon of the East Cape diocese on 27 November 1842. The CMS missionaries appointed to the diocese included: George Adam Kissling and Margaret Kissling at Kawakawa (Hicks Bay) from 1843 to 1846; Charles and Hannah Baker at Uawa (Tolaga Bay) from 1843 to 1851; James and Elizabeth Hamlin at Wairoa from 1844 to 1864; William and Elizabeth Colenso at Waitangi (Ahuriri, Napier) from 1844, until William Colenso was removed in 1852; and Thomas Samuel Grace at Tūranga from 1850 to 1853.

Williams lived at Tūranga until 1850, when he decided to move the Tūranga station, Whakato, to Waerenga-ā-hika, a new site about seven miles further inland. In 1850 Williams and his family left for England, where he was involved the successful representations to have his brother Henry restored to membership of the Church Missionary Society – Henry having been dismissed from the CMS as a consequence of his refusal to follow the orders of Bishop Selwyn to give up land that Henry had acquired at Pakaraka.

Williams returned to Waerenga-ā-Hika and lived there from 1853 to 1865. On 3 April 1859 Williams was appointed the first Bishop of Waiapu, basing his diocese at Waerenga-ā-Hika. The Ordination of Raniera Kawhia, the first held by Williams, took place at Whareponga near East Cape on 17 February 1860. The first Synod of the Waiapu Diocese was held at Waerenga-a-hika on 3 December 1861. At this time there were 10 clergy in the diocese, 6 priests and 4 deacons.

In 1865 there were fourteen clergymen – six European and eight Māori – in the Waiapu diocese. The Māori were: at Waiapu, Rota Waitoa, Raniera Kawhia and Mohi Tūrei; at Tokomaru, Matiaha Pahewa; at Wairoa, Tamihana Huata; at Tūranga, Hare Tawhaa; at Table Cape, Watene Moeka; at Maketu, Ihaia Te Ahu.

The Waiapu Māori Church, representing the district from Hicks Bay to Table Cape (Kahutara Point), Māhia Peninsula, met at Tūranganui on 30 October 1870. There were eight clergymen present, seven of whom were Māori, as well as Māori laymen. Williams ordained Hare Tawhaa of Tūranganui and Mohi Tūrei of Rangitukia as priests, and Wi Paraire of Hicks Bay and Hone Pohutu as deacons.

== Treaty of Waitangi – te Tiriti ==
Williams attempted to limit the acquisition of land by the New Zealand Association. In a letter to Edward Garrard Marsh of 8 January 1840 Williams explained his plans to follow his brother Henry's lead in acquiring land to hold in 'trust' for the benefit of the Māori from whom the land had been purchased: "In proceeding to Turanga it is my intention to buy as much land as may suffice for the inhabitants, and I also hope to take the same step at Waiapu and Wairoa, & then I will set the association at defiance." However this attempt was thwarted by Governor Gipps' proclamation of 14 January 1840, which annulled the trust deed that conveyed title over the Tūranga land; at this time the commission of the Governor of the colony of New South Wales extended to any land that might be acquired in New Zealand.

Following the signing of the Treaty of Waitangi (te Tiriti), Henry Williams arrived in Poverty Bay on 8 April 1840 on the ship Ariel with a Māori-language copy of te Tiriti ('Tūranga Treaty copy'). Between 5 May and 9 June 1840, William Williams, presented the Tūranga Treaty copy to rangatira at Tūranga, Uawa, Wakawitirā, Rangitukia and Tokomaru so that those East Coast chiefs could sign; 41 signatures appear on the Tūranga Treaty copy, a number of important rangatira refused to sign, including Te Kani a Takirau of Uawa and Iharaira Te Houkamau of East Cape.

- Tūranga Treaty copy of the Treaty of Waitangi on New Zealand History online

In 1847 Williams published a pamphlet that defended the role of the Church Missionary Society in the years leading up to the signing of the Treaty and in relation to the war in the north that was started by Hōne Heke. Williams took a literal interpretation of the Treaty of Waitangi. In June 1861 he wrote to Governor Thomas Gore Browne and criticised "the pernicious habit" of Land Commissioners getting one or two people to sign contracts for the sale of land without consulting the whole tribe. Williams recognised that both the Land League of Taranaki and the Māori King Movement or Kīngitanga of Waikato reflected a genuine unease among the Māori as to the manner in which the government was purchasing land.

== Pai Mārire (Hauhau) ==
The First Taranaki War, from March 1860 until 1862 resulted in the East Cape and Poverty Bay area became increasingly unsettled. A 'repudiationist' movement developed in Poverty Bay. The Ngāti Kaipoho chief Raharuhi told Governor Thomas Gore Browne that the Māori did not recognise Queen Victoria's claim to rule over them and that the lands which the settlers in Poverty Bay had obtained should be returned.

The Pai Mārire (Hauhau) moved into Poverty Bay in March 1865. The Poverty Bay Māori were neither for nor against the Hauhau. While the Rongowhakaata iwi defended the mission, Williams lost confidence in the security of the mission when some chiefs provided support for the Hauhau. There were rumours that the Hauhau intended to incite the Poverty Bay Māori to some act of violence against Bishop Williams so as to force them into joining the Hauhau movement. On 31 March 1865 William and Jane Williams and their daughters went to Napier on the steamer St Kilda. However Leonard remained at the mission.

Williams returned to Paihia where he established a Māori missionary training school at Horotutu.

The mission at Waerenga-ā-hika became a battle ground. After the Hauhau were defeated the Māori in the Poverty Bay had a much reduced support for the Christian faith, although it was sustained where there were CMS missionaries and Māori clergymen. In July 1868, Te Kooti and a band of Hauhau escaped from the Chatham Islands and returned to the East Coast. Fighting began all over again until the pursuit of Te Kooti ended.

== Residence in Napier ==
Hawkes Bay was added to the Waiapu diocese and in May 1867 William and Jane Williams moved to Napier, in which Waiapu Cathedral was the centre of the diocese. Samuel Williams, his nephew and son-in-law, formed the Te Aute estate. Williams supported his nephew in establishing a school for Māori boys on the Te Aute estate and Te Aute College opened in 1854. Williams also supported his daughters in establishing a school for Māori girls. In July 1875 Hukarere Native School for Girls, which became the Hukarere Girls' College, was established in Napier. Williams also worked to establish the Napier Boys' High School.

Williams was consecrated as the Bishop of Waiapu on 3 April 1859 at the meeting of the General Synod at Wellington. Williams continued as bishop until he had a stroke in 1876 and resigned. He died in Napier on 9 February 1878.

Religious titles
New title	Bishop of Waiapu –	Succeeded by Edward Craig Stuart

== Publications ==
- Dictionary of the New Zealand Language and a Concise Grammar (1844)
- Williams, William (1847). Plain Facts relative to the Late War in the Northern District of New Zealand – via National Library of Australia.
- Letters to the Rt Hon. the Earl of Chichester (1851) Online available from ENZB
- Christianity among the New Zealanders (1867) Online available from Archive.org

== Literature and sources ==
- Hugh Carleton, 'The Life of Henry Williams', Vol. I (1874). Republished by Early New Zealand Books (ENZB), University of Auckland
- Hugh Carleton, 'The Life of Henry Williams', Vol. II (1874). Republished by Early New Zealand Books (ENZB), University of Auckland
- Frances Porter. 'Williams, William – Biography' in Dictionary of New Zealand Biography (DNZB)
- Evans, Rex D. (compiler) (1992) – Faith and farming Te huarahi ki te ora; The Legacy of Henry Williams and William Williams. Published by Evagean Publishing, 266 Shaw Road, Titirangi, Auckland NZ. ISBN 0-908951-16-7 (soft cover), ISBN 0-908951-17-5 (hard cover), ISBN 0-908951-18-3 (leather bound)
- Fitzgerald, Caroline (2004) – "Letters from the Bay of Islands". Sutton Publishing Limited, United Kingdom; ISBN 0-7509-3696-7 (Hardcover). Penguin Books, New Zealand, (Paperback) ISBN 0-14-301929-5
- Fitzgerald, Caroline (2011) – Te Wiremu – Henry Williams: Early Years in the North, Huia Publishers, New Zealand ISBN 978-1-86969-439-5
- Gillies, Iain and John (1998) – East Coast Pioneers. A Williams Family Portrait; A Legacy of Land, Love and Partnership. Published by The Gisborne Herald Co. Ltd, Gladstone Road, Gisborne NZ. ISBN 0-473-05118-4
- Williams, Frederic Wanklyn. "Through Ninety Years, 1826–1916: Life and Work Among the Maoris in New Zealand: Notes of the Lives of William and William Leonard Williams, First and Third Bishops of Waiapu". Early New Zealand Books (NZETC).
- Williams, William (1867) – Christianity among the New Zealanders. London. Online available from Archive.org
- Williams, W. The Turanga Journals, 1840–1850, ed. F. Porter. Wellington, 1974 Online available from ENZB
- Obituary, New Zealand Herald (11 February 1878)
