= Alfred Averill =

British-born New Zealand bishop (1865–1957)

The Most Reverend Alfred Averill CMG
- Archbishop of New Zealand
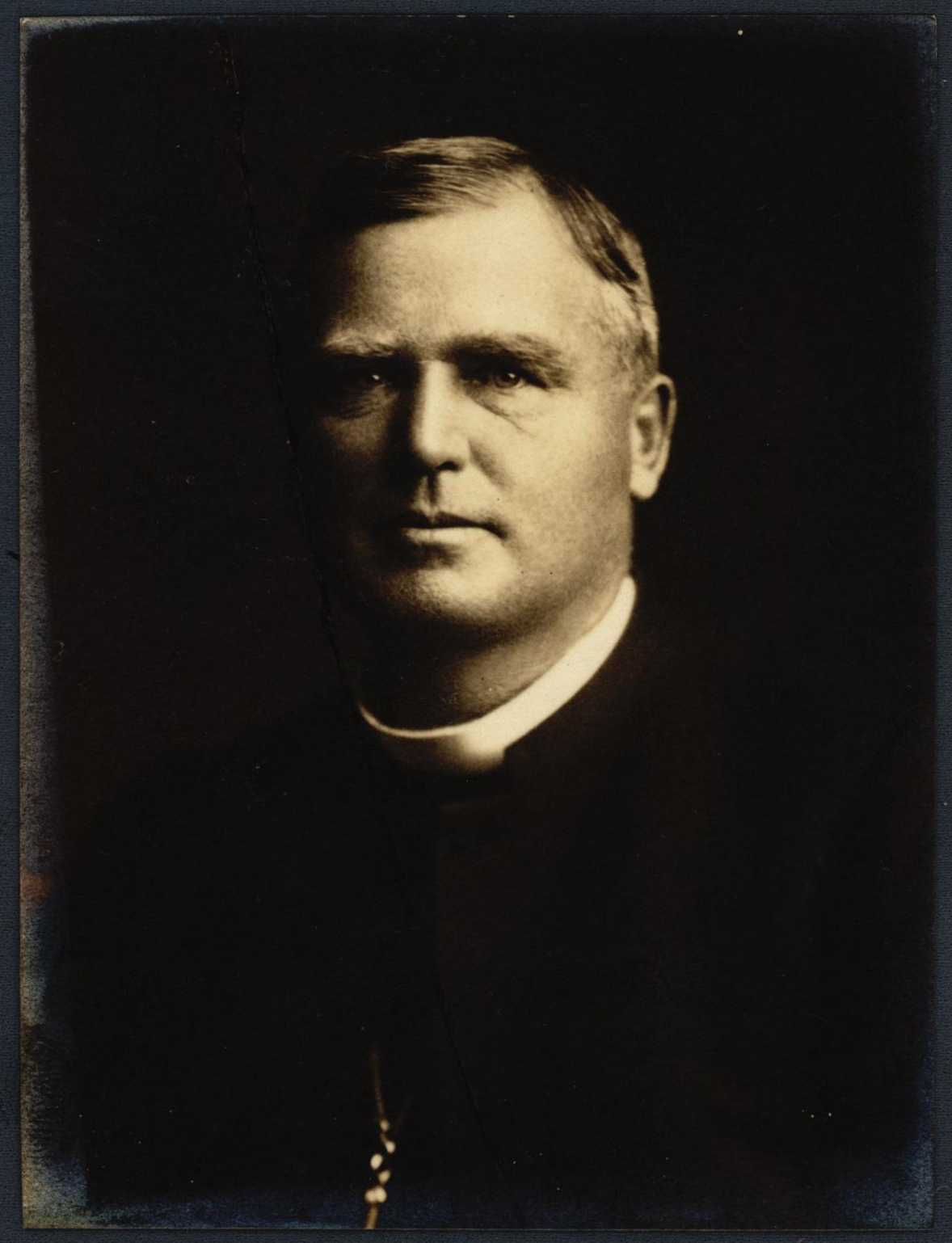
- Averill in 1929
- Diocese: Auckland
- Predecessor: Churchill Julius
- Other post: Bishop of Waiapu

Personal details
- Born: Alfred Walter Averill; 7 October 1865 Staffordshire, England
- Died: 6 July 1957 (aged 91) Christchurch, New Zealand
- Denomination: Anglicanism
- Parents: Henry Alcock Averill & Sarah Ellen Wootton
- Spouse: Mary Weir
- Children: Walter Averill (priest); Leslie Averill (physician)
- Education: St John's College, Oxford; Ely Theological College

Alfred Walter Averill CMG (7 October 1865 – 6 July 1957) was the second Anglican Archbishop of New Zealand, from 1925 to 1940. He was also the fifth Anglican Bishop of Auckland whose episcopate spanned a 25-year period during the first half of the 20th century.

== Biography ==
Born in Castle Church, Staffordshire he was educated at King Edward VI School, Stafford and St John's College, Oxford, where his course of study was Honour Theology. He rowed for his College and got his colours for playing both rugby and association football (soccer). He graduated in 1887, then he attended the Ely Theological College. He was made deacon in St Paul's Cathedral by Frederick Temple, Bishop of London, on the Fourth Sunday in Advent 1888; and ordained priest on 22 December 1889 in London; before embarking on an ecclesiastical career with a curacy at St George's, Hanover Square.

In 1891 he accepted a position as an assistant curate from the vicar of Holy Trinity parish, Dalston in the north-east of London. He married Mary Weir on 30 November 1893 at Christ Church Lancaster Gate, London.

Emigrating to New Zealand in 1894, he became Vicar of St Michael and All Angels in Christchurch on 2 March 1894, remaining in that post until his consecration as bishop. Additionally, he was a Canon of ChristChurch Cathedral (13 November 1902 – 1909), Archdeacon of Akaroa (13 November 1902 – 1909) and Archdeacon of Christchurch (7 April 1909 'til consecration).

Elected Bishop of Waiapu in 1909, Averill was consecrated a bishop on 16 January 1910, by Samuel Nevill, Bishop of Dunedin and Primate of New Zealand, and other bishops, at Napier Cathedral. Elected on 30 September 1913, he was translated to Auckland on 31 January 1914, and he was further promoted to be Archbishop of New Zealand effective 21 April 1925.

At the 1925 Synod, he supported amendment of the constitution of the Anglican Church of New Zealand so that it would enjoy full autonomy from the Church of England. He supported the creation of the bishopric of Aotearoa in 1928, which resulted in the appointment of Frederick Bennett as the Bishop of Aotearoa and the Spiritual Leader of the Māori people.

He engaged in dialogue with Bishop James Liston of the Roman Catholic Church and the ministers of the Presbyterian and non-episcopal Churches. Early in his episcopate in Auckland, he was appointed the first chairman of the Council of Christian Congregations.

He served as second Archbishop and Primate of New Zealand until 1939, resigned his See (Auckland) effective 31 March 1940 and retired to Christchurch. He was cremated and then interred at Purewa Cemetery in the Auckland suburb of Meadowbank.

== Support of education ==
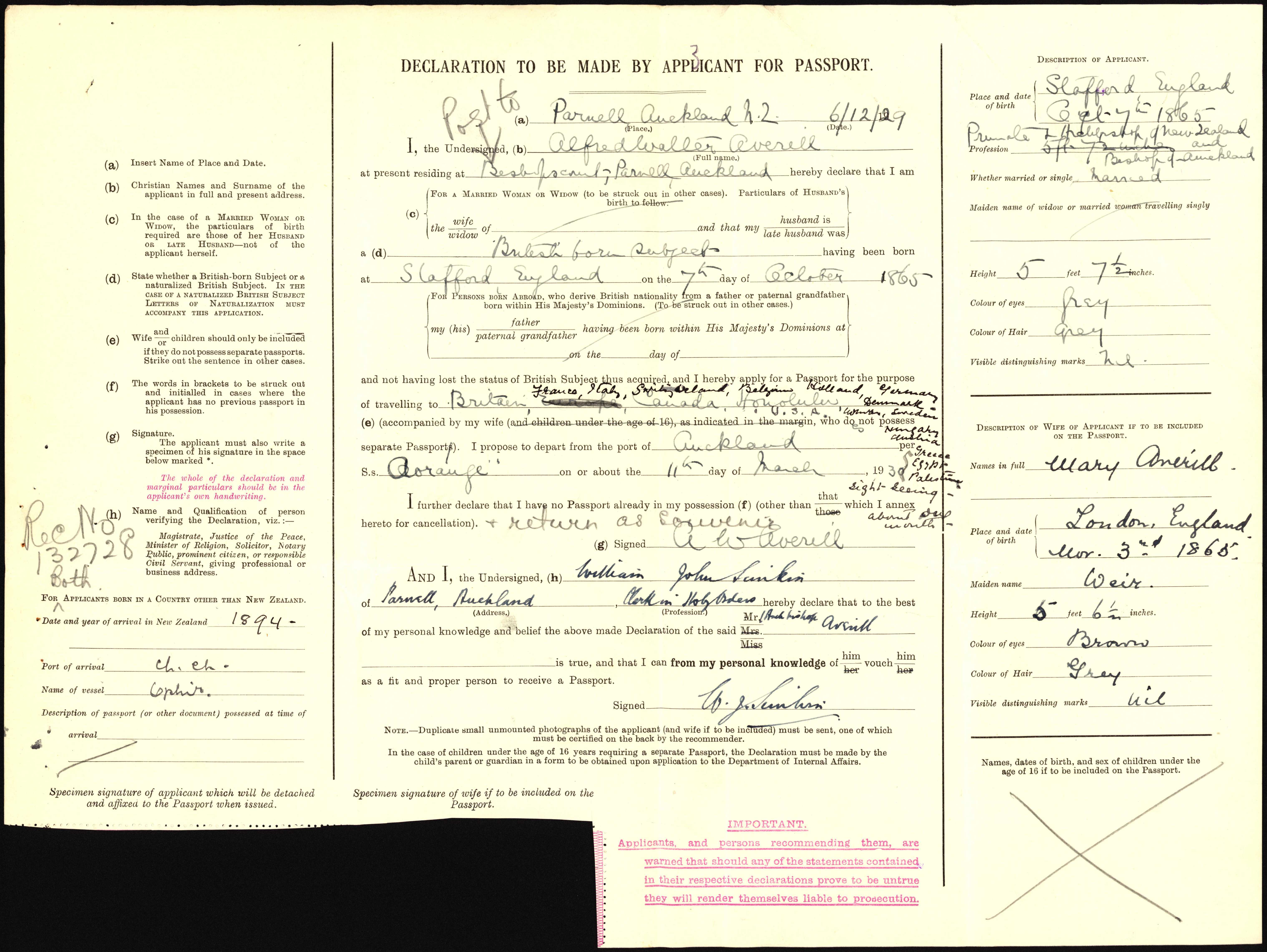
Archbishop Alfred Averill and Mary Averill passport application (1929)

Before being appointed as the Bishop of Waiapu, he was a member of the governing body Christ's College, Christchurch. After his appointment as Bishop on Auckland in 1914, he became a member of the board of King's College, Auckland during the time the School moved from Remuera to its present location in Ōtāhuhu. Averill House, which was founded in 1961, was named in his honour.

== Associations with organisations ==
He supported the St John Ambulance Association and Brigade, the New Zealand Red Cross, serving as a vice-president of the Auckland Branch. He was the first honorary member of the Rotary Club of Auckland. He also supported the Bible in State Schools League of New Zealand, the New Zealand Society for the Protection of Women and Children, the Royal Society of St George and the Royal Empire Society.

== Honours and awards ==
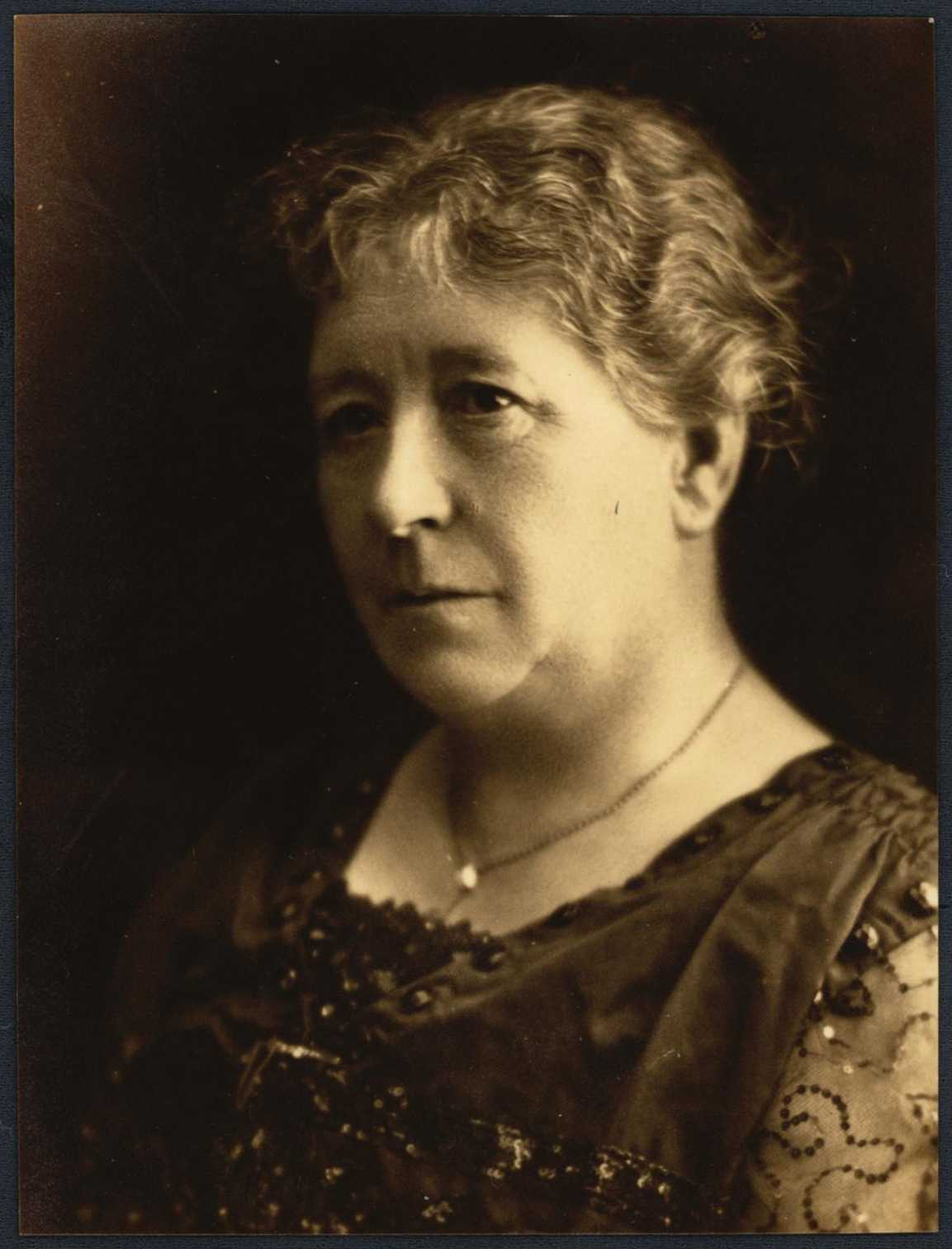
Mary Averill in 1929

He was made an honorary doctor of divinity of Oxford University (1912), a sub-prelate of the Order of St John (1924), and an episcopal canon of St George's Collegiate Church, Jerusalem.

In 1935, he was awarded the King George V Silver Jubilee Medal. Shortly before his death in 1957, he was appointed a Companion of the Order of St Michael and St George in the 1957 Queen's Birthday Honours.

== Family ==
Alfred was married to Mary (née Weir, died 5 November 1951, at Timaru, aged 86). Alfred's eldest son, Walter Averill, became a priest and served as Archdeacon of Timaru; a second son, Leslie Averill, served with the New Zealand Expeditionary Force towards the end of the First World War, and played a key role in the capture of Le Quesnoy in France. He later became a prominent medical administrator and community leader in Christchurch. A third son, Wilfred Selwyn Weir Averill, trained as a barrister and solicitor, practising law in Hawkes Bay. He died of septicaemia in Auckland in 1938.

== Notes ==
Religious titles
Preceded by William Leonard Williams	Bishop of Waiapu; 1910–1914	Succeeded by William Walmsley Sedgwick
Preceded by Owen Thomas Lloyd Crossley	Bishop of Auckland, NZ; 1914–1940	Succeeded by William John Simkin
Preceded by Churchill Julius	Archbishop of New Zealand; 1925–1940	Succeeded by Campbell West-Watson
