= George Cruickshank (bishop) =

Bishop of Waiapu; English-born Anglican bishop

George Craig Cruikshank (1881 – October 1951) was the seventh Bishop of Waiapu from 1945 to 1946. He used his second name, Craig, as can be seen in his final, poignant letter to his diocese, in which he closed "To one and all, my wife and I say farewell in grateful remembrance of all you have been to us. Ever your friend, CRAIG WAIAPU," adopting the traditional episcopal form of replacing his family name with that of his diocese.

He was born in 1881 and educated at Keble College, Oxford. He was ordained in 1908 and was a curate at St Hilda's Church, Darlington and then vicar of Whangarei. This was a position he technically held twice, from 1910-1913, and then from 1914-1923, as during the war years he served as a chaplain to the first New Zealand Expeditionary Force. From 1923 to 1932 he was vicar of Remuera. In 1932 he became Dean of Dunedin, a post he held until his ordination to the episcopate. He was elected Bishop of Waiapu in November 1944 and consecrated and enthroned (in the terminology of the day) in February 1945.

Unfortunately he was affected by ill health, and forced on medical advice to resign only a little over a year after his enthronement. Bishop Cruickshank retired to Russell and was nursed by his wife Kate (née Stephenson) until her sudden death in Whanganui in December 1947. He died on 30 Sep 1951, his funeral service was held at St. Mark's, Remuera, and he is buried in the churchyard of the historic Christ Church Anglican church in Russell.

Religious titles
Preceded by George Gerard	Bishop of Waiapu; 1945–1946	Succeeded by Norman Lesser
