= Peter Atkins (bishop) =

New Zealand Anglican bishop (1936–2022)

The Right Reverend Peter Atkins
- Bishop of Waiapu
- Province: Aotearoa, New Zealand and Polynesia
- Diocese: Waiapu
- In office: 1983–1990
- Predecessor: Ralph Matthews
- Successor: Murray Mills

Personal details
- Born: Peter Geoffrey Atkins; 29 April 1936
- Died: 11 May 2022 (aged 86) Auckland, New Zealand
- Denomination: Anglicanism
- Spouse: Rosemary Atkins
- Children: 1
- Education: Sidney Sussex College, Cambridge

Peter Geoffrey Atkins (29 April 1936 – 11 May 2022) was a New Zealand Anglican clergyman, who served as the Bishop of Waiapu from 1983 to 1990.

== Biography ==
Born on 29 April 1936, Atkins was educated at Merchant Taylors' School, Crosby, and Sidney Sussex College, Cambridge. He was ordained in 1963. He began his ordained ministry with a curacy at Karori, after which he was a priest-tutor at St Peter's Theological College in the Solomon Islands. Later, he was vicar of Waipukurau, then diocesan secretary and registrar in the Diocese of Waiapu. He was archdeacon of Hawke's Bay from 1979 until 17 September 1983, when he was ordained to the episcopate. In 1990, he was awarded the New Zealand 1990 Commemoration Medal.

After resigning his see, Atkins moved to Auckland in 1991 where he was dean at St John's Theological College and a lecturer in liturgy and evangelism at the University of Auckland. He was also a senior research fellow at the University of Birmingham, and wrote a series of books on practical theology.

Atkins died in Auckland on 11 May 2022, at the age of 86.

Anglican Communion titles
Preceded by Ralph Matthews	Bishop of Waiapu; 1983–1990	Succeeded by Murray Mills
