= Ralph Matthews =

New Zealand bishop (1928–1983)

The Rt Rev Ralph Vernon Matthews (3 April 1928 – 4 March 1983) was the 11th Anglican Bishop of Waiapu, New Zealand, whose brief Episcopate spanned a four-year period during the third quarter of the 20th century.

He was educated at Napier Boys' High School and the University of Auckland, and was ordained in 1956. He embarked on his ecclesiastical career with a curacy in Hastings, New Zealand, after which he was Vicar of Waipukurau, then Taupō. From 1976 to 1979 he was Archdeacon of Waiapu, before his consecration to the Episcopate as its Diocesan Bishop, which See he held until his death in Auckland on 4 March 1983, at the age of 54. His wife, Pauline Matthews, died in 2026.

Anglican Communion titles
Preceded by Paul Reeves	Bishop of Waiapu; 1979–1983	Succeeded by Peter Geoffrey Atkins
