= Eric Menees =

American Anglican bishop

The Right Reverend Eric Menees
- Bishop of San Joaquin
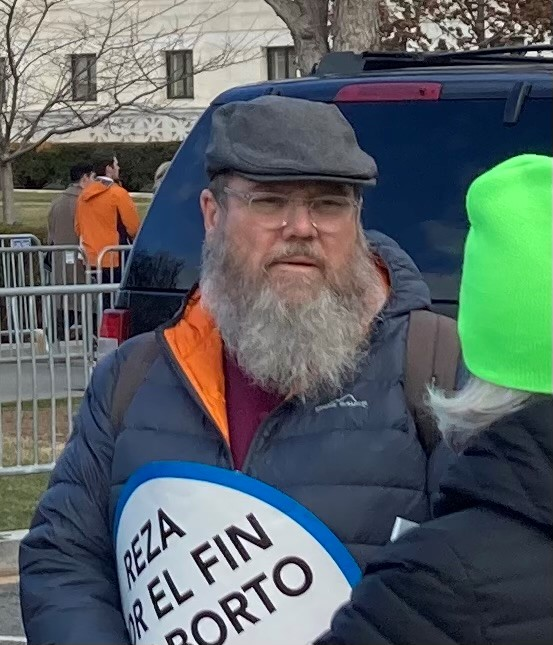
- Eric Menees marching with Anglicans for Life at the 2023 March for Life in Washington, D.C.
- Church: Anglican Church in North America
- Diocese: San Joaquin
- In office: 2011–present
- Predecessor: John-David Schofield
- Successor: Incumbent

Orders
- Consecration: September 24, 2011 by Archbishop Robert Duncan

Personal details
- Born: 1961 (age 63–64)

Eric Vawter Menees (born 1961) is an American Anglican Bishop currently serving as bishop ordinary of the Anglican Diocese of San Joaquin of the Anglican Church in North America in California.

== Background ==
Menees was born and grew up in Southern California. After graduating from General Theological Seminary he was ordained in the Episcopal Diocese of Los Angeles. In addition to spending several months as a missionary in El Salvador and Mexico, he has also served at parishes in east Los Angeles, Orange County, San Diego and La Jolla.

Menees served for the first period of his ministry priest in the Episcopal Church. He transferred his priestly orders to the oversight of the Anglican bishops from the Global South and in 2006 he planted a new Anglican church in the San Diego area. On May 14, 2011, Menees was elected to succeed John-David Schofield as bishop of San Joaquin. He was consecrated on September 24 and enthroned on October 22.

In addition to his role as the bishop ordinary of San Joaquin, Menees serves as the president of Forward in Faith North America, the episcopal representative to Caminemos Juntos, leads the Border Bishop's Conference, and serves as the Anglican Church in North America's representative to the Anglican Church of South America and the United States Conference of Catholic Bishops.

Anglican Communion titles
Preceded by John-David Schofield	Anglican Bishop of San Joaquin; 2011–present	Succeeded by Incumbent
