= Reginald Owen (bishop) =

Reginald Herbert Owen (25 May 1887 – 24 February 1961) was an Oxford don, public school headmaster and Anglican bishop.

== Life and career ==
Born on 25 May 1887 he was educated at Dulwich College and Wadham College, Oxford.

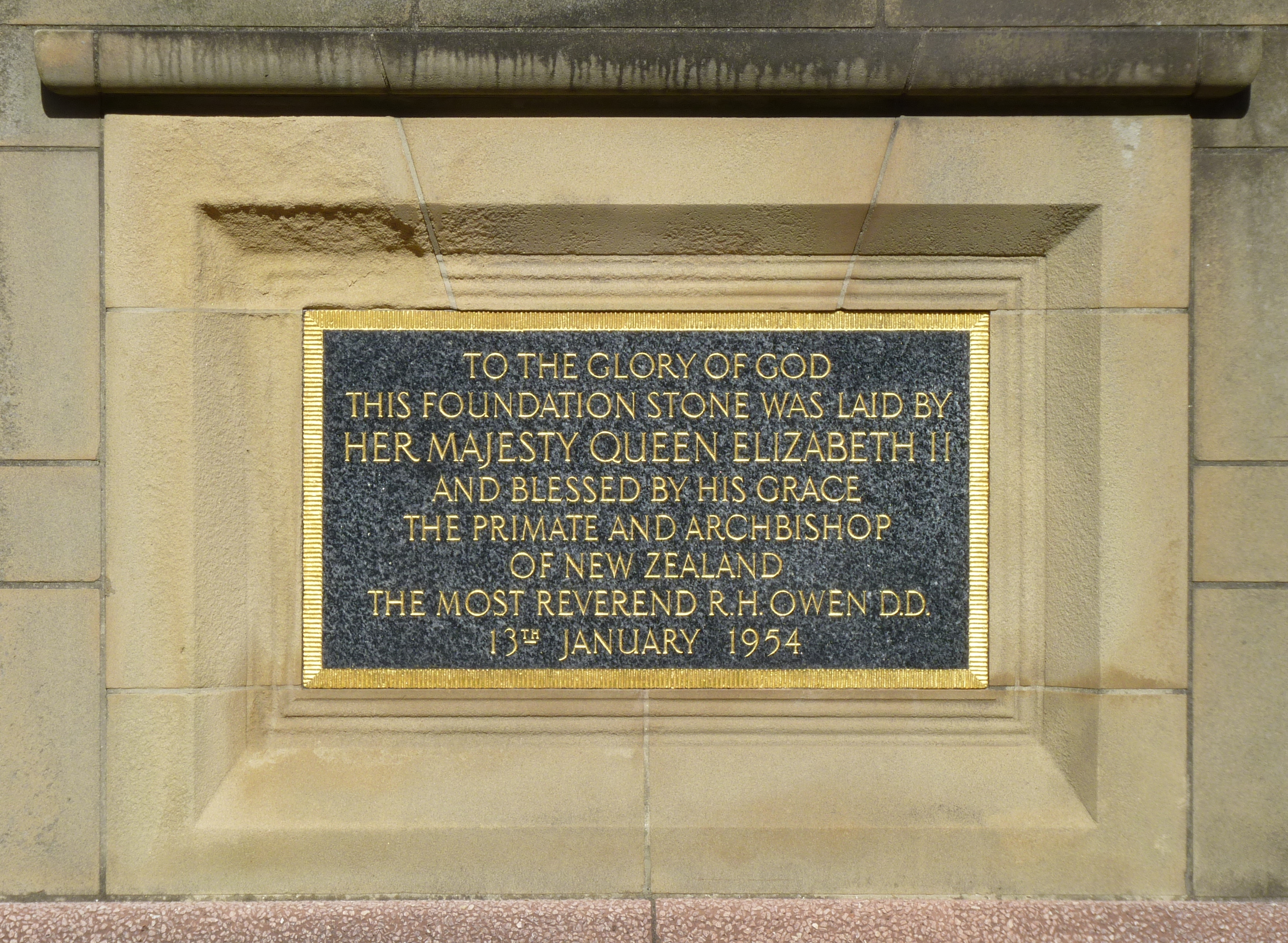
Owen's name on the foundation stone of the Cathedral of Saint Paul

Alternating between secondary and tertiary education, he was an assistant master at Clifton College; a fellow and lecturer at Worcester College, Oxford; headmaster of Uppingham School; and fellow, chaplain and lecturer at Brasenose College, Oxford, before his ordination to the episcopate as Bishop of Wellington in 1947. In addition he was Primate of New Zealand from 1952 until his resignation on 29 February 1960. In 1953, he was awarded the Queen Elizabeth II Coronation Medal.

Owen died on 24 February 1961.

Church of England titles
Preceded by Herbert St Barbe Holland	Bishop of Wellington; 1947–1960	Succeeded by Henry Wolfe Baines
Preceded by Campbell West-Watson	Archbishop of New Zealand; 1952–1960	Succeeded by Norman Alfred Lesser
