= Norman Lesser =

Norman Alfred Lesser CMG (16 March 1902 – 13 February 1985) was an Anglican bishop and Archbishop of New Zealand from 1961 to 1971. He was the Bishop of Waiapu from 1947 to 1971.

== Education and early ministry ==
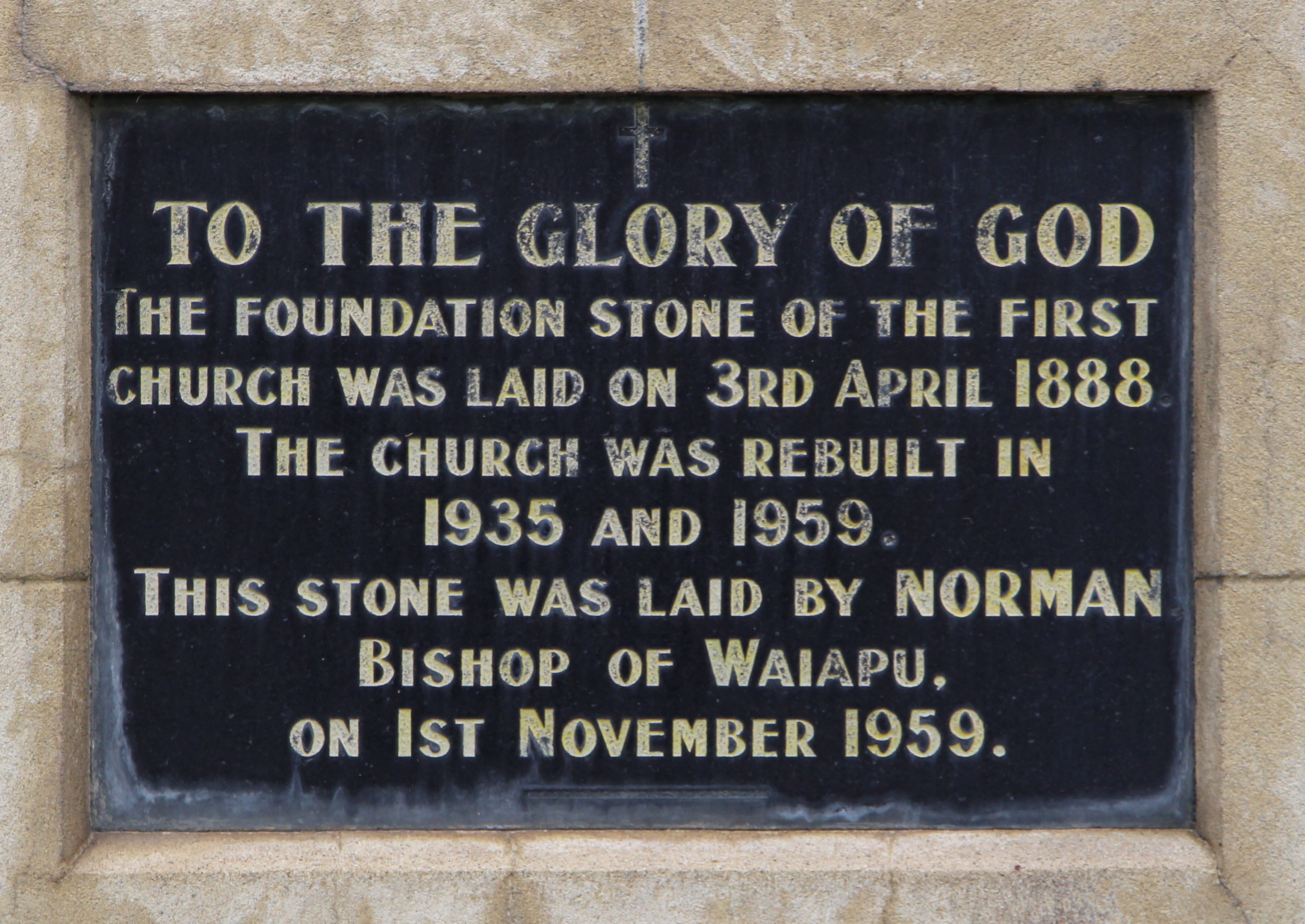
Foundation stone at St Johns Church in Dannevirke laid by Norman Lesser

Born in England in 1902, Lesser was educated at the Liverpool Collegiate Institution and Fitzwilliam College, Cambridge. He began his ecclesiastical career with a curacy at St Simon and St Jude, Anfield, Liverpool. He then held similar posts at Holy Trinity, Formby and Liverpool Cathedral. In 1931 he became Vicar of St John, Barrow-in-Furness. From 1931 to 1939 he was Rector and Sub-Dean of Nairobi Cathedral and from then until his elevation to the Waiapu See its Provost.

== Episcopal ministry ==
Lesser succeeded Archbishop Reginald Herbert Owen as Primate of the Anglican Church of New Zealand on his death in 1961. Norman Lesser Drive in Auckland is named after him.

In the 1971 Queen's Birthday Honours, Lesser was appointed a Companion of the Order of St Michael and St George, for services as Primate and Archbishop of New Zealand.

Lesser died in Napier on 13 February 1985.

Church of England titles
Preceded by George Cruickshank	Bishop of Waiapu; 1947–1971	Succeeded by Paul Reeves
Preceded by Reginald Owen	Archbishop of New Zealand; 1961–1971	Succeeded by Allen Johnston
