= Louis Childs Sanford =

The Right Reverend Louis Childs Sanford
- Missionary Bishop of San Joaquin
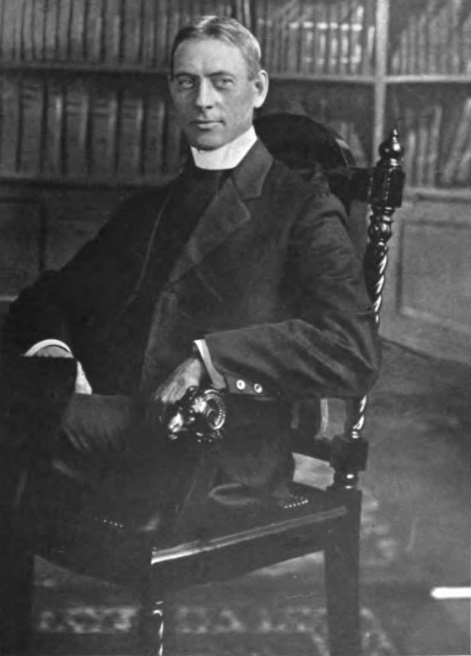
- Church: Episcopal Church
- Diocese: San Joaquin

Orders
- Consecration: 1911

Personal details
- Born: July 27, 1867 Bristol, Rhode Island
- Died: August 10, 1948 (aged 81)

Louis Childs Sanford (July 27, 1867 - August 10, 1948) was missionary bishop of San Joaquin, California, in the Episcopal Church in the United States of America.

== Publications ==
- “A California Pilgrimage” (1921) (with William Ingraham Kip)
- “Province of the Pacific” (1949)
