= Lloyd Crossley =

The Right Reverend Lloyd Crossley
- Bishop of Auckland
- Diocese: Auckland
- Predecessor: Moore Neligan

Personal details
- Born: Owen Thomas Lloyd Crossley; 30 April 1860
- Died: 3 March 1926 (aged 65) London, England
- Denomination: Anglicanism
- Education: Trinity College, Dublin

Owen Thomas Lloyd Crossley (30 April 1860 – 3 March 1926) was the fourth Anglican Bishop of Auckland for a short period during the second decade of the 20th century. Educated at the Belfast Academy and Trinity College, Dublin he was made deacon 8 June 1884 and ordained priest 31 May 1885, both times at Down; and began his ecclesiastical career with a curacy at Seapatrick, County Down. Incumbencies at St John's Church, Egremont and Almondbury were followed by a period living in Australia, including six years (18 September 1905 – 1911) as Vicar of All Saints, St Kilda, and Archdeacon of Geelong. He was also Archbishop's Chaplain, a lecturer at St John's Theological College, Melbourne (1907-1911), and Chairman of Governors of Geelong Grammar School. Not long after his appointment in 1905, he was elected to a vacancy on the Council of Trinity College (University of Melbourne). On 25 March 1911, he was appointed to the episcopate as Bishop of Auckland.

He was consecrated bishop on 25 April 1911 at St Mary's Cathedral, Auckland, by Churchill Julius, Bishop of Christchurch. Ill health prompted his return from New Zealand two years later — he resigned his See effective 30 September 1913 — and he served the remainder of his career as Rector of St Andrew's Major near Cardiff (1914–1917) and Assistant Bishop of Llandaff (2 June 1917 – 30 April 1921), retiring to Bramshott, Hampshire. He died after being hit by a motor-van, soon after alighting from a bus in London.

Religious titles
Preceded by Moore Neligan	Bishop of Auckland; 1911–1913	Succeeded by Alfred Averill
