= John Bluck =

New Zealand Anglican bishop

The Right Reverend John Bluck
- Bishop Emeritus of Waiapu
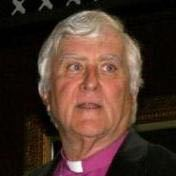
- John William Bluck
- Diocese: Anglican Diocese of Waiapu
- In office: 2002–2008
- Predecessor: Murray Mills
- Successor: David Rice
- Other post: Dean of ChristChurch Cathedral (1990–2002)

Orders
- Ordination: 1971 (as priest); 17 August 2002 (as bishop) by Bishop Paul Reeves

Personal details
- Born: John William Bluck; 22 July 1943 (age 83) Napier, New Zealand
- Denomination: Anglican
- Occupation: Anglican bishop
- Profession: Cleric, author
- Education: University of Canterbury

John William Bluck (born 22 July 1943) is a New Zealand author and an Anglican clergyman who served as the 14th Anglican Bishop of Waiapu from 2002 until 2008. From 1990 to 2002 he was the eleventh Dean of ChristChurch Cathedral; until he was ordained to the episcopate on 17 August 2002.

== Early life and education ==
Bluck was born in Napier in 1943, the eldest son of Edgar and Alice Bluck. Bluck spent his childhood in Nūhaka. He is a maternal nephew of two other New Zealand Anglican Bishops, Edward Norman and Peter Mann, bishops of Wellington and Dunedin, respectively. He boarded at Napier Boys’ High School, and at the age of 18 studied English literature and theology at the University of Canterbury. Bluck was offered a place at the Episcopal Theological School in Cambridge, Massachusetts but finished most of his studies at Harvard Divinity School. While studying in the United States, Bluck was a reporter for The Pilot, Boston's Catholic Newspaper.

== Ordained ministry ==
Bluck was ordained as a priest in 1971 by Bishop Paul Reeves and began his ministry at Holy Trinity, Gisborne. He soon moved to Wellington to tutor journalism at Wellington Polytechnic, as well as being the institution's chaplain. Bluck soon moved to Auckland and was editor of The New Zealand Methodist.

Later he was Director of Communications at the World Council of Churches then Professor of Pastoral Theology and Communication at Knox Theological Seminary.

In 1990, Bluck was invited to be the Dean of ChristChurch Cathedral by Bishop David Coles, which he accepted. Bluck held this position until 2002 where he became the 14th Anglican Bishop of Waiapu.

Bluck resigned his See in 2008.

== Retired life ==
Bluck is now an author. He creates podcasts for Radio New Zealand and writes articles and opinion pieces for them and other New Zealand media companies.

== Publications ==
=== Authorship ===
- Taranaki's Cathedral (13 January 2010)
- Wai Karekare = Turbulent Waters: The Anglican Bicultural Journey, 1814 - 2014 (1 January 2012)
- Seeking the Centre (1 January 2019)
- Becoming Pākehā. (Auckland: HarperCollins, 2022).

=== Forewords ===
- Honest to Goodness (12 March 2019)

Anglican Communion titles
Preceded by Murray Mills	Bishop of Waiapu; 2002–2008	Succeeded by David Rice
