= William Sedgwick (bishop) =

New Zealand bishop

The Right Reverend William Walmsley Sedgwick
- Bishop of Waiapu
- Province: East Coast, New Zealand
- Diocese: Anglican Diocese of Waiapu
- Installed: 22 February 1914
- Predecessor: Alfred Averill

Personal details
- Born: William Walmsley Sedgwick; 1858 Freemantle, Hampshire
- Died: 3 May 1948 (aged 89)
- Denomination: Anglicanism
- Spouse: Margarita Helen Sedgwick
- Education: Christ's College, Cambridge

The Rt Rev William Walmsley Sedgwick (1858–1948) was the 5th Anglican Bishop of Waiapu, New Zealand, whose Episcopate spanned a 15-year period during the first half of the 20th century.

Born at Freemantle in Southampton, England, he was educated at St Martin's, York and matriculated in 1879. He attended Christ's College, Cambridge and graduated in 1882 with a B.A. He was ordained as a deacon at Dover in 1882, and as a priest at Canterbury in 1883. He embarked on his career with a curacy at St. John The Baptist, Wateringbury.

He was a Naval Chaplain from 1884 to 1886; he took part in the Suakin Expedition, 1884–85; and served as Chaplain on H.M.S. Thunderer in the Mediterranean Fleet, 1885–86. He held incumbencies at Hockley Heath in the West Midlands, England, 1886–89; Vryburg, British Bechuanaland, 1889–93; Bedford, Eastern Cape, 1893–96; Evershot, Dorset, 1897–98; and he became the chaplain to the Earl of Home, 1897–1900.

He emigrated to New Zealand and was appoint as the vicar of Waikari, 1901–03; vicar of Akaroa, 1903–04; vicar of St Luke's Church, Christchurch, 1904–14; canon of ChristChurch Cathedral, Christchurch, 1911–14; and chaplain to the Bishop of Christchurch, 1914.

On 22 February 1914 he became the Bishop of Waiapu. He retired as bishop in 1929. His last post was as Vicar of Detling, Kent, England, 1931–32. From 1938 until his death in 1948 he was licensed to officiate in the Diocese of Grahamstown, Makhanda, South Africa.

== Notes ==
Religious titles
Preceded by Alfred Averill	Bishop of Waiapu; 1914–1929	Succeeded by Herbert Williams
