= Chester Talton =

American bishop (1941–2025)

The Right Reverend Chester Talton
- Provisional Bishop of San Joaquin
- Church: Episcopal Church
- Diocese: San Joaquin
- Elected: 2011
- In office: 2011–2014
- Retired: 2020
- Predecessor: Jerry Lamb
- Successor: David Rice
- Previous post: Suffragan Bishop of Los Angeles (1991–2010)

Orders
- Ordination: February 1971
- Consecration: January 26, 1991 by Edmond L. Browning

Personal details
- Born: September 22, 1941 El Dorado, Arkansas, U.S.
- Died: November 20, 2025 (aged 84) Altadena, California, U.S.
- Denomination: Anglicanism
- Parents: Chester Talton & Mae Ola Shells
- Spouse: Karen Louise Warren (m. 1963; died 2003) April Grayson (m. 2007)
- Children: 4

Chester Lovelle Talton (September 22, 1941 – November 20, 2025) was an American bishop in the Episcopal Church who served as the Provisional Bishop of the Diocese of San Joaquin.

== Background ==
Talton was born in El Dorado, Arkansas, to Chester Talton and Mae Ola Shells. He was ordained deacon in 1970 and to the priesthood in February 1971, in the San Francisco-based Diocese of California. He married Karen Louise Warren on August 25, 1963, and has four children from this union. Karen Talton died in 2003. Talton remarried in 2007, to April Grayson, a lay leader in the Diocese of Los Angeles. He was African American, and one of 37 black bishops who have been consecrated by the Episcopal Church.

Talton died following declining health form spinal surgery and hospitalization, in Altadena, California, on November 20, 2025, at the age of 84.

== Education ==
Talton studied at California State University, Hayward, California where he earned his B.S. in 1965, and Church Divinity School of the Pacific, Berkeley, California, where he earned his M.Div. in 1970, and ultimately his D.D.

== Positions held ==
Positions held included Provisional Bishop, Diocese of San Joaquin, 2011–2014; Bishop Suffragan, Diocese of Los Angeles, 1991 to 2010; Rector, St. Philip's Church, New York City (Harlem), 1985–1990; Mission Officer, Trinity Church Wall Street, New York City, 1981–1985; Rector, St. Philip's Church, Saint Paul, Minnesota, 1976–1981; Vicar, Holy Cross Church, Chicago, Illinois, 1973–1976; Vicar, St. Mathias' Mission, and Curate, All Saints' Church, Carmel, California, 1971–1973; and Vicar, Good Shepherd Church, Berkeley, California, 1970–1971.

Talton's consecrators were Edmond L. Browning, Orris George Walker, and Robert Marshall Anderson.

== Bibliography ==
- Race and prayer: collected voices, many dreams / Malcolm Boyd and Chester L. Talton, editors. Harrisburg, Pa.: Morehouse Pub., c. 2003. xii, 202 p. : ill.; 23 cm. ISBN 0-8192-1909-6 (pbk.)
