= Leslie Averill =

New Zealand soldier and doctor

Leslie Averill CMG MC FRCS
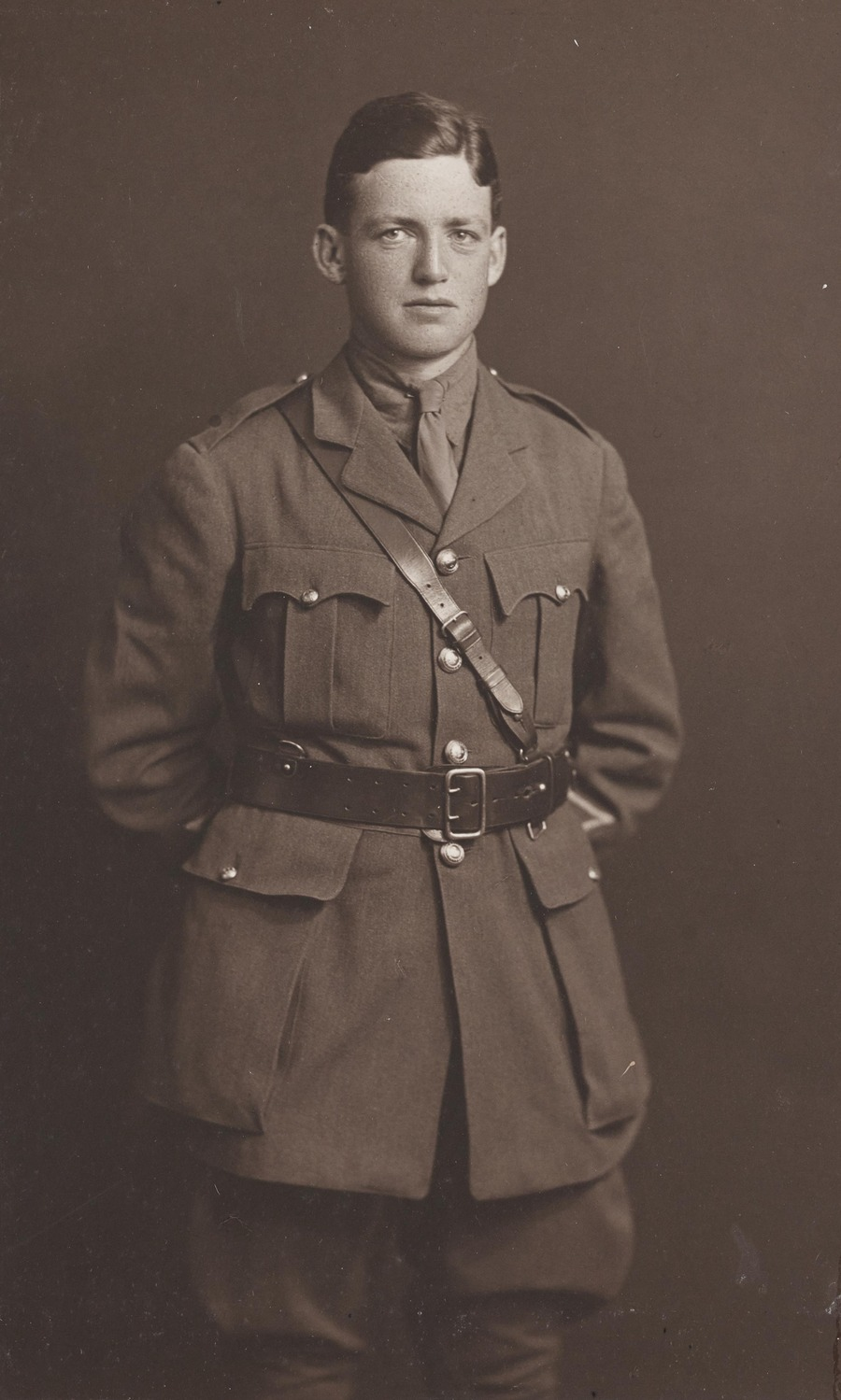
- Born: Leslie Cecil Lloyd Averill; 25 March 1897
- Died: 4 June 1981 (aged 84)
- Relatives: Alfred Averill (father)
- Military career
- Allegiance: New Zealand
- Branch: New Zealand Military Forces
- Rank: Second Lieutenant
- Unit: 4th Battalion, New Zealand Rifle Brigade
- Conflicts: First World War; Western Front
- Awards: Order of St Michael and St George; Military Cross
- Other work: Doctor; Medical administrator

Leslie Cecil Lloyd Averill CMG MC FRCS (25 March 1897 – 4 June 1981) was a New Zealand soldier who served during the First World War on the Western Front. After the war, he became a doctor and established a private practice in his hometown of Christchurch. He also served as a medical administrator and community leader.

== Early life ==
Leslie Averill was born on 25 March 1897 at Christchurch in New Zealand to a local vicar and his wife. His father, Alfred Averill, would later serve as Archbishop of New Zealand from 1925 to 1940. Educated at Christ's College, he was an excellent student and was head prefect in 1915. The following year, he began studying medicine at Auckland University. However, in 1916 when a good friend, Paul Clark volunteered to fight in World War I with the New Zealand Expeditionary Force (NZEF), he decided to join as well.

== Military career ==
Averill was commissioned as a second lieutenant after training at Trentham Military Camp. Arriving in France in May 1918, he was posted to the 4th Battalion of the New Zealand Rifle Brigade. He fought in the Second Battle of Bapaume in August, leading a company of the battalion and was awarded the Military Cross for his gallantry and leadership during the battle. Afterwards, he was posted to the Divisional Traffic Control Branch.

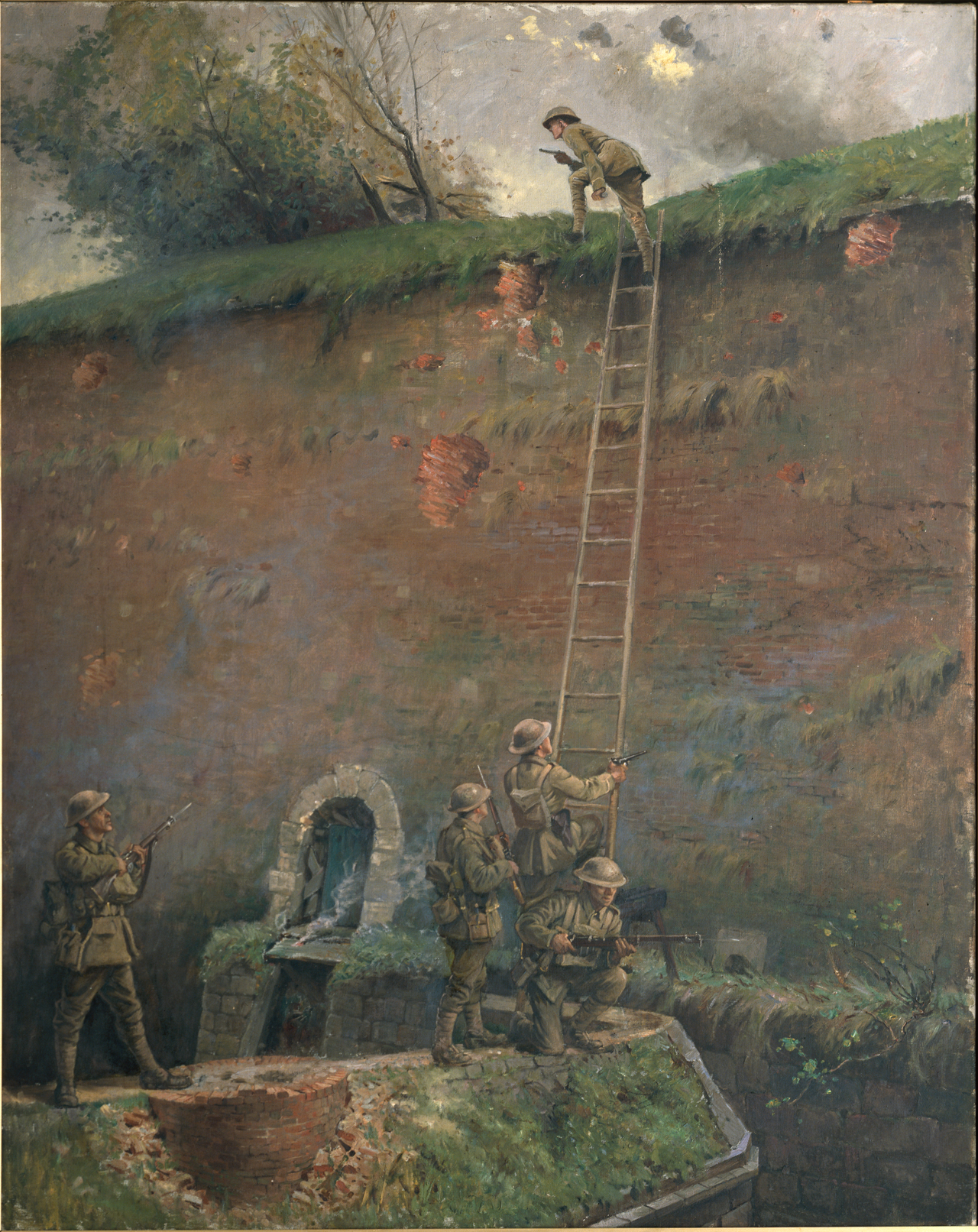
A 1920 painting depicting the scaling of the walls of Le Quesnoy, with Averill at the top of the ladder. The artist was George Edmund Butler, an official artist of the New Zealand Expeditionary Force

In November 1918, the Rifle Brigade was tasked with the capture of the fortified town of Le Quesnoy. The town was surrounded by extensive ramparts which made a direct assault difficult, particularly as the town itself could not be bombarded due to the civilians present. On 4 November 1918, Averill, now the battalion's intelligence officer, scouted the defences and was able to locate an approach route that was not under fire from the German defenders. A platoon brought up a 30-foot ladder which Averill was able to ascend to reach the top of the ramparts. Seeing off two Germans manning a guard post with revolver fire, the rest of the platoon, and shortly thereafter the battalion, joined him and entered the town. The Germans quickly surrendered Le Quesnoy. The war ended the following week and from December, Averill performed occupation duty in Germany for the next several months.

== Later life ==
Granted an NZEF scholarship in October 1919, Averill studied medicine at the University of Edinburgh. He graduated as a medical doctor in 1924, submitting a thesis on the detection and treatment of placenta praevia for his degree. He was elected a Fellow of the Royal College of Surgeons of Edinburgh the following year. He returned to New Zealand in 1925 and married Isabella Mary Wilkie Roberton in Auckland. His new wife had also qualified as a medical practitioner, but did not work after their marriage. The couple would go on to have five children.

Averill began a general practice in Christchurch in 1926 but would also be heavily involved in regional and national medical services and administration. He helped set up a private hospital that opened in Papanui in 1928 and would remain associated with the hospital for over 40 years. He was also employed at St Helens Hospital as medical superintendent from 1929 until 1962. The North Canterbury Hospital Board, Christchurch Blood Transfusion Service and Hospital Boards' Association of New Zealand all benefited from his leadership. In 1961, he was recognised for his significant services in medicine in the New Year Honours with appointment as a Companion of the Order of St Michael and St George. His contributions were not limited to medicine; he was on the board of governors of Christchurch College for nearly 20 years, served as a president of the Old Boy's Associate of his former high school, and was a member of Christchurch's Rotary Club.

Averill retired from general practice in 1967. Even in retirement, he continued a long association with the ChristChurch Cathedral, having served as a lay canon since 1943. He died on 4 June 1981, survived by his wife and four children.

== Legacy ==
Throughout his postwar life, Averill maintained strong links with Le Quesnoy. He returned to the town in 1923 to unveil the New Zealand War Memorial there with Marshal Joseph Joffre and Sir James Allen, New Zealand's High commissioner to London. The township appointed Averill a citoyen d'honneur (honorary citizen) on the 50th anniversary of the relief of Le Quesnoy in 1968, and five years later in 1973 he was appointed a Chevalier of the Légion d'honneur by the French President. In a later visit, a new school and street were named in his honour.
