= Episcopal Diocese of San Joaquin =

Diocese of the Episcopal Church in the United States

Coordinates: 37°N 119°W

Diocese of San Joaquin

Location
- Ecclesiastical province: VIII

Statistics
- Parishes: 19 (2025)
- Members: 1,493 (2023)

Information
- Denomination: Anglican
- Rite: Episcopal
- Cathedral: St. James Episcopal Cathedral
- Language: English, Spanish

Current leadership
- Bishop of San Joaquin: Greg Kimura
- Bishops emeritus: David Rice

Map
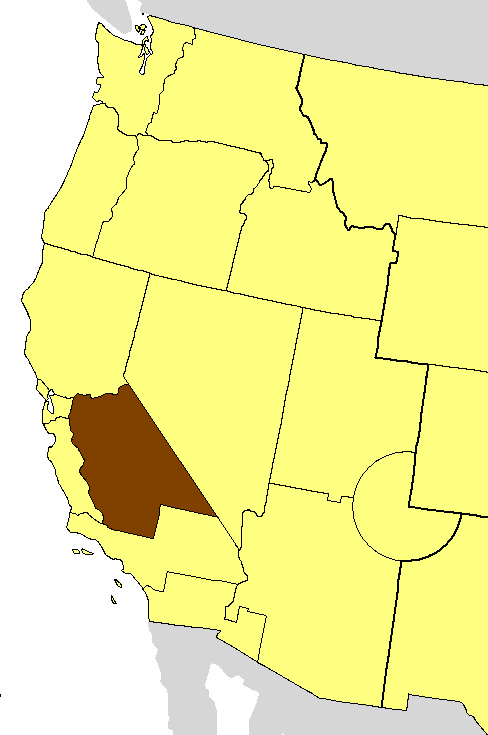
- Location of the Diocese of San Joaquin

Website
- diosanjoaquin.org

The Episcopal Diocese of San Joaquin (EDSJ) is a diocese of the Episcopal Church (TEC), located in central California with its headquarters in Fresno. It can trace its roots back to the earliest days of American settlement in California.

The diocese reported 2,038 members in 2017 and 1,493 members in 2025. Plate and pledge income for the 19 filing congregations of the diocese in 2025 was $1,480,780. Average Sunday attendance (ASA) in 2025 was 676 persons.

== History ==
In 1910, the Episcopal Diocese of California petitioned the General Convention to create the Missionary District of San Joaquin from a portion of its territory. The Diocese of California ceded 14 counties in central California (and the 23 Episcopal congregations within those counties) back to the General Convention. The General Convention formed those 14 counties into the Missionary District of San Joaquin. In 1961, the Missionary District of San Joaquin petitioned the General Convention for "consent to the formation of a new Diocese out of the whole of the Missionary District of San Joaquin." The General Convention accepted the petition and approved the proposed diocesan constitution and canons, thus forming the Episcopal Church's Diocese of San Joaquin.

== Diocesan controversy ==
Over the years, the diocese had become known as one of the more conservative dioceses within the Episcopal Church. Due to ongoing disagreements with the national church in matters such as the blessing of same-sex relationships and the ordination of women a rift developed within the diocese between those who wished to remain in the Episcopal Church and a majority who wished to leave. On December 8, 2007, a majority of the delegates at the diocese's convention voted to leave the Episcopal Church in order to form the Anglican Diocese of San Joaquin. The remaining clergy and laity who did not vote to leave continue to constitute the Episcopal Diocese of San Joaquin. Various court decisions have determined that those who left largely did so as individuals and not as a diocese.

The diocese had been one of the last three that did not ordain women (the others were the dioceses of Quincy and Fort Worth). The pre-separation Episcopal Diocese of San Joaquin had a membership of approximately 8,500.

On January 11, 2008, Katharine Jefferts Schori, the Presiding Bishop, inhibited John-David Schofield from the exercise of the office of a bishop. On March 1, 2008, Schofield tendered his resignation from the House of Bishops of the Episcopal Church, although he continued on as the bishop of the Anglican Diocese of San Joaquin. On March 12, 2008, he was deposed by action of the House of Bishops.

A special diocesan convention met on March 29, 2008, in Lodi, California elected Jerry Lamb (retired bishop of Northern California) as provisional bishop of a reorganized Episcopal Diocese of San Joaquin. Jefferts Schori stated that "The Episcopal Church will continue in the Diocese of San Joaquin, albeit with new leadership." The Executive Council of the Episcopal Church as a whole agreed to provide $700,000 to help defray the expenses associated with reorganization in San Joaquin and other dioceses facing similar challenges. At the regular diocesan convention in October 2008, delegates voted to create an "equality commission", charged with affirming marginalized communities within the diocese, including women, lesbians and gays, as well as several ethnic groups.

On October 17, 2008, the standing committee of the Episcopal Diocese of San Joaquin determined that 16 deacons and 36 priests who opted to realign with the Southern Cone had abandoned the communion of the Episcopal Church. This decision paved the way for Lamb to remove the 52 clergy. In June 2009, Episcopal leaders deposed all clergy (61 in all) who had joined Schofield in affiliating with an Anglican diocese in Argentina.

== Bishops since the diocesan controversy ==
On March 5, 2011, Chester Lovelle Talton was formally seated at Holy Family Church in Fresno as the diocese's provisional bishop. Talton succeeded Jerry A. Lamb, who had served as provisional bishop since February 2008. Lamb had announced his intention to retire and called for the special meeting, in accordance with the diocesan constitution.

On March 29, 2014, Talton retired and was succeeded by David Rice, who previously served as a bishop in the Anglican Church of New Zealand. Rice was elected and seated as Bishop Diocesan in 2017.

Since April 2026, Episcopal Diocese of Los Angeles Rev. Dr. Gregory Kimura leads as the new diocesan bishop.

== Court cases and rulings ==
On July 21, 2009, the Superior Court of California ruled that the diocese cannot leave the Episcopal Church and that Lamb is the head of the diocese. Schofield was found not to be the head of the diocese and was ordered to relinquish all money, property and any assumed authority. However, on November 11, 2010, the lower court's ruling was overturned by the 5th appellate court, remanding the property issues to be retried by the lower court under neutral principles. The appeals court, however, also ruled that several matters of fact had been established in the trial record and were not subject to re-litigation. These included that Schofield had been inhibited from all episcopal actions in January 2008, that in March 2008 he had been deposed; and that from the date of the special convention in March 2008, Lamb was the bishop of the Episcopal diocese.

Litigation over parish property has resulted in court orders awarding various properties to the Episcopal diocese, including churches in Bakersfield, Sonora, Turlock, and Ridgecrest. Other cases involving parish property remain unsettled.

On April 2, 2014, a California Superior Court has ruled that the 160-year-old St. John the Evangelist Church in downtown Stockton, California, is to be used for the mission of the Episcopal Church. St John's was suddenly returned to the EDSJ on April 17, 2014, just days before Easter. Easter services were arranged by newly elected David Rice who thought it important that no lapse in services should be allowed to occur. On May 7, 2014, Anne Smith celebrated the Eucharist at St. John's, Stockton. She was the first woman to celebrate the Eucharist at St. John's in its more than 150 year history and 38 years after the Episcopal Church approved the ordination of women.

In May 2014 the courts announced a tentative decision ordering the remaining 27 properties and various other assets to be returned to the Episcopal diocese. St. James Cathedral, the former diocesan offices, the Evergreen Conference Center Oakhurst (ECCO) near Yosemite National Park, the diocesan investment trust and 25 other church properties, valued at about $50 million, are included in the May 5 decision. In the 41-page opinion in the case brought by the Episcopal Church and its Diocese of San Joaquin, Fresno County Superior Court Judge Donald S. Black also said that "because a diocese is a geographical construct of the Church, it makes no sense that a diocese can ‘leave’ the Church; it does not exist apart from the Church." On August 18, 2014, in a letter to the Anglican Diocese of San Joaquin, Eric Menees announced that he has decided to appeal this decision to the Fifth District Court of Appeals. On April 5, 2016 the Fifth District Court of Appeals ruled in favor of the Diocese of San Joaquin and found that Schofield's attempts to transfer title to the properties was void. On July 13, 2016 the California State Supreme Court denied the petition of the Anglican Diocese of San Joaquin for review. In essence, and practically speaking, this is a conclusion to the case involving the Anglican Diocese Holding Corp. properties.

== List of bishops ==
1. Louis Childs Sanford, 1911-1944 (Missionary Bishop)
2. Sumner F. D. Walters, 1944-1968 (Missionary Bishop 1944-1961)
3. Victor M. Rivera, 1968-1989
4. John-David Schofield, 1989-2008
  * Jerry A. Lamb, 2008-2011 (Provisional)
  * Chester Talton, 2011-2014 (Provisional)
5. David Rice, 2017–2026 (Provisional 2014-2017)
6. Gregory W. Kimura, 2026-present
