= Murray Mills (bishop) =

New Zealand priest

Murray John Mills (born 29 May 1936) was the 13th Anglican bishop of Waiapu from 1991 to 2002.

He was educated at the University of Auckland and ordained in 1961. He embarked on his ecclesiastical career with a curacy at Papakura. After a similar post in Whangārei he held incumbencies at the Bay of Islands then Matamata. From 1976 to 1981 he was Archdeacon of Waikato then Dean of Waiapu until 1991, in which year he became the diocesan bishop. He was consecrated a bishop on 2 February 1991. He was a member of the Presidium of the Conference of Churches of Aotearoa New Zealand. He is married to Judith Anne Mills.

Religious titles
Preceded by Peter Geoffrey Atkins	Bishop of Waiapu; 1991–2002	Succeeded by John William Bluck
