= Moore Neligan =

The Right Reverend Moore Neligan
- Bishop of Auckland
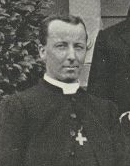
- Neligan in 1904
- Diocese: Anglican Diocese of Auckland
- Predecessor: William Cowie

Personal details
- Born: Moore Richard Neligan; 6 January 1863 Dublin, Ireland
- Died: 22 November 1922 (aged 59)
- Denomination: Anglicanism
- Education: Trinity College, Dublin

Moore Richard Neligan (6 January 1863 – 22 November 1922) was the Anglican Bishop of Auckland during the first decade of the 20th century.

Neligan was born in Dublin, the son of Rev. Maurice Neligan, a prominent Irish-Evangelical clergyman who was canon of Christ Church Cathedral, Dublin. He was educated at Reading School and Trinity College, Dublin, from which he graduated in 1884. He was ordained deacon and priest in 1886 and 1887 by the Archbishop of York, after embarking on an ecclesiastical career with a curacy at Sculcoates, Hull. He was briefly Vicar at East Dereham, before he became curate of Christ church, Lancaster Gate in 1890. Four years later he transferred to St. Stephen, Westbourne-park, in Paddington. He was nominated to the colonial episcopate in Auckland in November 1902, and took up the position in 1903. Ill health prompted his return from New Zealand in 1910, and he served the remainder of his career as Rector of Ford, Northumberland.

== World War I ==
Neligan served from 4 July 1918 until 30 November 1918 as a reverend 4th class in the New Zealand Chaplains Department attached to the 4th New Zealand Infantry Brigade. For his service he received the British War Medal.

== Notes ==
Religious titles
Preceded by William Garden Cowie	Bishop of Auckland; 1903–1910	Succeeded by Owen Thomas Lloyd Crossley
