= Andrew Hedge =

Andrew William Lindsay Hedge CStJ (born in Papatoetoe, 1972) is the current Anglican Bishop of Waiapu in New Zealand.

Hedge was ordained in 1998. After a curacy at All Saint's Howick, he was Chaplain at Kings School, Auckland; and Vicar of Cambridge, New Zealand from 2008 until his appointment to the episcopate. He was consecrated a bishop on 18 October 2014.

Religious titles
Preceded by David Rice	Diocese of Waiapu; 2014–present	Incumbent
