= Henare Potae =

New Zealand Māori tribal leader

Henare Potae (?–1895) was a New Zealand tribal leader. Of Māori descent, he identified with the Te Whanau-a-Ruataupare hapū of the Ngāti Porou iwi (tribe).

His pā was at Te Mawhai on the headland that forms the south head of Tokomaru Bay.

In 1865 the Pai Mārire movement (commonly known as Hauhau) was active on the East Coast. Potae opposed the Hauhau and on 18 August 1865 near Tahutahu-po, where the Hauhaus had taken up a position between Tokomaru and Tolago Bay, Potae and 36 warriors fought a large body of Hauhaus at Pakura. Ropata Wahawaha and 90 Ngāti Porou warriors were close by and engaged the Hauhaus, who were decisively defeated. About 200 Hauhaus, who were driven out of Tokomaru, made their way by the middle of September 1865 to Waerenga-ā-hika, which was the Church Missionary Society (CMS) mission station that had been established by the Rev. William Williams in the Poverty Bay district. Potae went to Waerenga-ā-hika with 30 to 40 of his warriors on 28 September and 30 October to support the colonial government forces – Forest Rangers and settler volunteers - who were opposing the Hauhau.

In November 1865 an attack by the Hauhau was feared. HMS Esk was sent to fetch Potae, Ropata, and Mokena and 260 Ngāti Porou warriors from Tokomaru Bay. They were landed at Poverty Bay on 9 November, and, on the same day, 100 Forest Rangers, under Major Fraser, arrived from Waiapu. The mission at Waerenga-ā-hika became a battle ground. After the Hauhau were defeated, Te Kooti and his supporters were sent to the Chatham Islands, however they escaped and returned to the East Coast. Fighting began all over again. Potae and his warriors participated in the pursuit of Te Kooti. An expedition, which started from Poverty Bay in June 1871, was divided into four companies of 50 men, each of which could work independently if necessary. The leaders were Potae, Ropata Wahawaha, Captain Porter and Ruka Aratapu. Potae participated in the action on 1 September 1871 when the expedition surrounded Te Kooti's camp at Te Hapua, although Te Kooti escaped.
