= Edward Stuart =

British Anglican bishop

The Right Reverend Edward Stuart
- Bishop of Waiapu
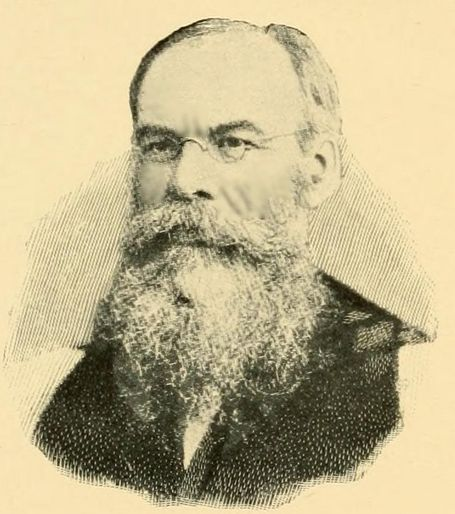
- Edward Stuart
- Province: East Coast of the North Island of New Zealand
- Diocese: Anglican Diocese of Waiapu
- Predecessor: William Williams

Personal details
- Born: Edward Stuart; 1827 Edinburgh
- Died: 15 March 1911 (aged 83) England
- Spouse: Anne Alicia de Courcy (married, 1851)
- Occupation: Anglican bishop

Edward Craig Stuart (1827 – 15 March 1911) was the second Anglican Bishop of Waiapu, whose episcopate spanned a 16-year period during the second half of the 19th century. Stuart served as a missionary under the auspices of the Church Missionary Society (CMS) in London, which had appointed him to serve in India and later in New Zealand.

== Early life ==
He was born in Edinburgh, the son of Alexander Stuart and Mary McKnight. He was educated at Trinity College, Dublin, and ordained in 1850. With his great friend Valpy French Stuart worked in India as a CMS missionary for 21 years, first at Agra and latterly (until his appointment to the episcopate) at Jalalpur.

== Vocation ==
Stuart worked in India as a CMS missionary for 21 years, first at Agra and latterly (until his appointment to the episcopate) at Jalalpur. Recruited from came from India in 1874, Stuart, previously the Secretary of the Church Missionary Society at Calcutta, went to New Zealand for his health, and remained there, proving to be a valuable helper and adviser. At this time William Williams was Bishop, but on 25 March 1876, he was stricken with a paralytic stroke on the fiftieth anniversary of his arrival in New Zealand, which forced him to hand in his resignation as Bishop of Waiapu, where he lived for two more years. The Diocese, having the power of election under the constitution of the Church, chose Stuart to be Williams' successor. Williams was subsequently consecrated as Bishop on 9 December 1877, just twelve days before his prior fellow missionary in India in 1850, T. Valpy French, was consecrated first Bishop of Lahore.

At a meeting on 24 March 1885, Stuart proposed that a Gordon Memorial Mission be built in the Eastern Soudan in honor of Major-General Charles George Gordon, killed by the Ansar at Khartoum in January. Stuart's proposal was met with cheers and overwhelming support by the hundreds of people present.

== Later life ==
On 31 January 1894 he resigned and his last calling was as a CMS missionary in Julfa, Ispahan, Persia, for 15 years from 1894. Stuart died on 15 March 1911, having at some point become a Doctor of Divinity (DD).

== Sources ==
- Stock, Eugene (1913). The Story of the New Zealand Mission. London: Church Missionary Society.
- Stock, Eugene (1899). The History of the Church Missionary Society : its environment, its men and its work. Vol. III. London: Church Missionary Society.
- The Cyclopedia of New Zealand [Taranaki, Hawke's Bay & Wellington Provincial Districts]. Christchurch: NZETC, The Cyclopedia Company, Limited. 1908.
- "The Church Missionary Atlas (Persia)". Adam Matthew Digital. 1896.
- "The Cyclopedia of New Zealand". nzetc.victoria.ac.nz. 2016.

Religious titles
Preceded by William Williams	Bishop of Waiapu; 1877–1894	Succeeded by Leonard Williams
