= Anglican Diocese of San Joaquin =

Anglican diocese in the United States

Coordinates: 36°47′13″N 119°45′19″W

Location
- Ecclesiastical province: Anglican Church in North America

Statistics
- Parishes: 30 (2025)
- Members: 2,322 (2025)

Information
- Rite: Anglican
- Established: 2008
- Cathedral: Emmanuel Anglican Church, Fresno

Current leadership
- Bishop: Eric Menees

Website
- dioceseofsanjoaquin.net

The Anglican Diocese of San Joaquin (ADSJ) is a diocese in the Anglican Church in North America (ACNA). It came into being after a majority of congregants in the Episcopal Diocese of San Joaquin separated from the Episcopal Church in 2007. Prior to the separation, the Episcopal Church diocese was one of the most conservative in the church, and one of three that did not ordain women (the others being the dioceses of Quincy and Fort Worth). The Anglican diocese is now headquartered in Fresno. The pre-separation diocese had a membership of approximately 8,500.

Those who did not separate continue to constitute the Episcopal Diocese of San Joaquin (EDSJ). Following the separation, the departing group was initially named as a diocese of the Anglican Province of the Southern Cone. On June 22–25, 2009, in Bedford, Texas, the Diocese of San Joaquin joined several others churches and dioceses in creating a new Anglican province called the Anglican Church in North America. Although the ACNA is recognized by some sister provinces, it is not part of the worldwide Anglican communion by virtue of not being recognized by the Archbishop of Canterbury.

On 8 December 2007, at the annual convention of the Episcopal Diocese of San Joaquin, delegates voted to disaffiliate from the Episcopal Church and to align with the Anglican Province of the Southern Cone. The diocese claimed to remain, through the Southern Cone, within the Anglican Communion. Whether the diocese had the power to take that action is controversial. Those who believe it did not have this power say that the constitution and canons of the Episcopal Church do not permit dioceses to disaffiliate, that there is no provision for a diocese to relate to the Anglican Communion through an overseas province, and that the constitution and canons of the province of the Southern Cone do not permit it to have dioceses outside certain countries in South America. Those who believe it did have this power say that the diocese is the basic unit of the Anglican Communion and has the inherent power to leave a province, and that the Southern Cone claims it as a diocese under its protection in an extraordinary time of division. Any permanent change would require a change in the Southern Cone's constitution as well as the consent of the Anglican Consultative Council. Following the realignment, neither the diocesan bishop, John-David Schofield, nor the province of the Southern Cone addressed the legality of this apparent violation of the constitution of the Province of the Southern Cone. The Anglican Communion office website does not list the diocese as a part of the Province of the Southern Cone.

Regardless of the ecclesiastical disagreements, the civil courts have unequivocally ruled that parishioners have the right to leave the church but not to take church property with them. The Anglican Diocese and individual parishes have consistently been ruled against by the courts over the years.

Schofield was consecrated 9 October 1988 and became the Episcopal Church's diocesan bishop on 15 December 1988. On 1 March 2008, Schofield tendered his resignation from the House of Bishops of the Episcopal Church while claiming to possess continuing authority as the bishop of the Diocese of San Joaquin.

The Episcopal Church disputes the ability of a diocese to transfer from one province to another without the consent of its original province. As a result it considered those who allied themselves with the province of the Southern Cone to have left the Episcopal Church. Schofield and many of the former leaders of the Episcopal diocese disagreed. Schofield spoke at the time as if there were a single diocese of San Joaquin, no longer a part of the Episcopal Church, of which he was the bishop. He did not recognize the legitimacy of the Episcopal Church's claim of ongoing jurisdiction. Following the vote, Schofield was deposed by the House of Bishops of the Episcopal Church, but continued in office as the bishop of the Anglican Diocese of San Joaquin. (Jerry Lamb was elected provisional bishop of the Episcopal Diocese of San Joaquin in March 2008.)

On July 23, 2009, the Superior Court in California ruled that a diocese cannot leave the Episcopal Church, and that Bishop Lamb was the head of the continuing diocese. Bishop Schofield was found not to be the head of the diocese and had to relinquish all money, property and any assumed authority. On November 11, 2010 the lower court's ruling was overturned by the 5th appellate court. The ruling said that the local court erred when it involved itself in ecclesiastical issues by ordering that Lamb, not Schofield, was the rightful bishop. It remanded the property questions to the lower court to decide on "neutral" principles. However, the appeals court also specified that the trial record had established several points of fact that could not be re-litigated during the property trial. These included that Bishop Schofield had been inhibited from any episcopal actions in January 2008; had been removed as the Episcopal bishop in March 2008; and that Bishop Jerry Lamb was the Bishop of the Episcopal Diocese. None of this affected Bishop Schofield's status as a bishop of the Anglican diocese.

On 14 May 2011, the Anglican Diocese of San Joaquin, in special convention meeting, elected the Rev. Eric Menees as the new bishop of the diocese, succeeding Schofield, who had been in office since 1988. Menees was consecrated on 24 September 2011 and enthroned on 23 October 2011.

In 2013 the ADSJ was forced to abide by court rulings and return some properties to EDSJ. In 2014 further properties were surrendered, some by court order and others voluntarily.

In May 2014 In a preliminary decision, a California court ordered the return of 27 properties held by a breakaway group to the Episcopal Diocese of San Joaquin, and said that dioceses cannot opt to leave the Episcopal Church. St. James Cathedral, the former diocesan offices, the Episcopal Camp and Conference Center near Yosemite National Park (known as ECCO), the diocesan investment trust and 25 other church properties, valued at about $50 million, were included in the decision.

In the 41-page opinion in the case brought by the Episcopal Church and its Diocese of San Joaquin, Fresno County Superior Court Judge Donald S. Black said that "because a diocese is a geographical construct of the Church, it makes no sense that a diocese can 'leave' the Church; it does not exist apart from the Church." On August 18, 2014, in a letter to the Anglican Diocese of San Joaquin, Bishop Eric Menees announced that he had decided to appeal this decision to the Fifth District Court of Appeals. The appeal was ultimately unsuccessful, with the California Supreme Court declining to hear an appeal in 2016.

In 2025, the Diocese of San Joaquin reported 30 congregations with 2,322 members (down 1% from 2022) and average Sunday attendance of 1,483 (up 24% from 2022).

== See also ==
- Anglican realignment
