= David Rice (bishop) =

American bishop

David C. Rice is an American Anglican bishop and former Methodist minister. Since 2017, he has been bishop of the Episcopal Diocese of San Joaquin, Episcopal Church (United States): he had been its provisional bishop from 2014 to 2017. From 2008 to 2014, he was the 15th Bishop of Waiapu in the Anglican Church in Aotearoa, New Zealand and Polynesia. He was consecrated on 7 June 2008. He was previously Dean of Dunedin.

== Biography ==
Born in Lexington, North Carolina, he was educated at Lenoir-Rhyne University and Duke University.

Initially a Methodist minister, he was received into the Anglican Church in 1998 and served at Mt Herbert parish before his appointment to the deanery.

Rice resigned his New Zealand bishopric in 2014 to stand for election as provisional bishop of the Episcopal Diocese of San Joaquin in California. He was duly elected and was then formally seated as provisional bishop on March 29, 2014. On March 4, 2017, he was elected as diocesan bishop of the Episcopal Diocese of San Joaquin, having been the only nominee.

== See also ==
- List of Episcopal bishops of the United States
- Historical list of the Episcopal bishops of the United States

Anglican Communion titles
Preceded by John William Bluck	Bishop of Waiapu; 2008–2014	Succeeded by Andrew Hedge
Preceded by Chester Talton	Episcopal Bishop of San Joaquin; 2014–Present	Incumbent
