= Ihaia Te Ahu =

- Born: c. 1820 near Ōkaihau, New Zealand
- Died: 7 July 1895; Kaikohe, New Zealand
- Other names: Te Ahu or Ahu
- Occupation(s): Anglican Minister and Missionary
- Spouse: Katarina Hapimana

Ihaia Te Ahu (c. 1820–1895) was a notable New Zealand teacher and missionary. Of Māori descent, he identified with the Te Uri Taniwha hapū of the Ngāpuhi iwi. He was born in Ōkaihau, Northland, New Zealand.

In about 1832 he attended the Kerikeri Mission Station of Church Missionary Society (CMS). In 1832 he went with the Rev. Thomas Chapman to live at the Rotorua Mission of the CMS. From about 1835 he acted as the assistant teacher with the Rev. Chapman at Rotorua and from 1845 he was taking Sunday services when Chapman was absent.

He married Rangirauaka of the Ngati Riripo hapū of Te Arawa iwi on 9 May 1841; The same day Rangirauaka was baptised Katarina (Catherine) Hapimana (Chapman) by the Rev. Alfred Nesbit Brown at Tauranga, and Ihaia was baptised Ihaia (Isaiah). In September 1846, Ihaia, his wife and two children moved to Maketu, near Tauranga and in 1851 Chapman also moved to live at Maketu.

In 1857 he began theological training under the Rev. Brown at the Tauranga Mission. In 1858 he attended St. Stephen's School, Auckland. On 3 November 1861 he was ordained as a deacon by Bishop William Williams. The same year he was appointed by the CMS to lead the Maketu Mission, following Chapman moving to Auckland. He worked in the Tauranga and Maketu pastorate diocese until 1881, when he moved to live in Rotorua. He was instrumental in the building of St. Faith's Church, Rotorua, which was consecrated by Bishop Edward Stuart on 15 March 1885.

From 1882 to 1889 he was the vicar of the Ohinemutu pastorate. From about c. 1889 to 1892 he worked at St. Stephen College, Auckland.

In 1892 he retired to live at Kaikohe, where he died on 7 July 1895.
