= St John's Cathedral, Napier =

- Waiapu Cathedral of St John the Evangelist
- Waiapu Cathedral; Napier Cathedral
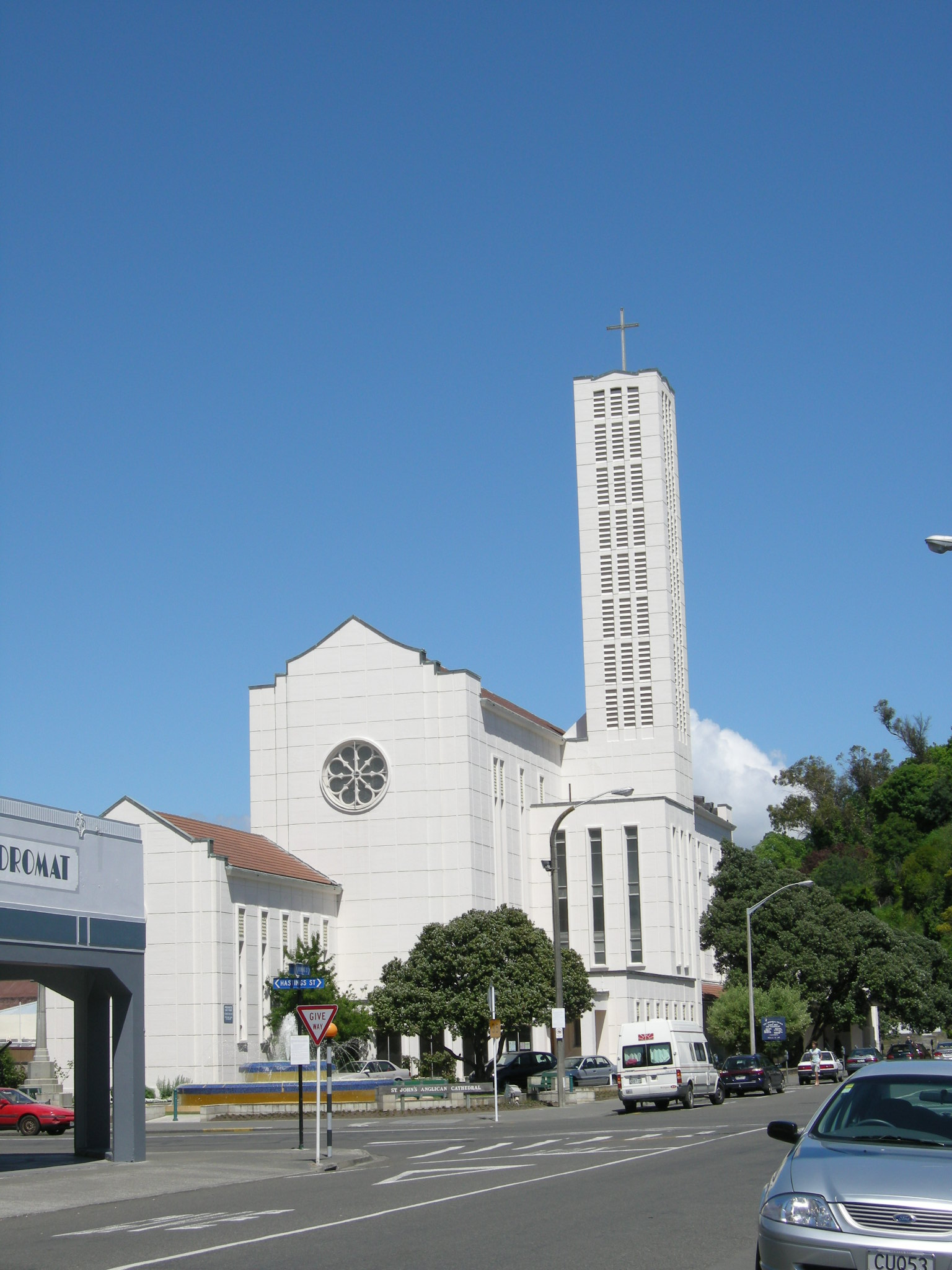
- St John's Cathedral, Napier
- St John's Cathedral, Napier
- 39°29′20″S 176°55′01″E
- Address: 28 Browning Street, Napier
- Country: New Zealand
- Denomination: Anglican
- Website: napiercathedral.org.nz

History
- Status: Cathedral
- Dedication: John the Evangelist
- Consecrated: 8 October 1967

Architecture
- Functional status: Active
- Previous cathedrals: 1
- Architects: R. S. D. Harman; Messrs Malcolm and Sweet
- Architectural type: Church
- Style: Modernism; Art Deco
- Years built: 1955–1965

Administration
- Province: Anglican Church in Aotearoa, New Zealand and Polynesia
- Diocese: Waiapu

Clergy
- Bishop: Andrew Hedge
- Dean: The Very Rev'd Alister Hendery (Acting)

St John's Cathedral, Napier, officially the Waiapu Cathedral of Saint John the Evangelist, is an Anglican cathedral church located in Browning Street, Napier, New Zealand.

Commonly called either Waiapu Cathedral or Napier Cathedral, the cathedral is the mother church of the Diocese of Waiapu of the Anglican Church in Aotearoa, New Zealand and Polynesia. The cathedral serves as the seat (cathedra) for both the Bishop of Waiapu, Andrew Hedge, and for the Bishop of Aotearoa (Māori: Te Pihopa o Aotearoa), Don Tamihere. This cathedrae is a distinctive aspect of Waiapu Cathedral, differing from St Anne's Cathedral, Belfast, which also serves two Anglican dioceses but is the seat of neither.

Construction of the present building was completed 1965, and the cathedral was consecrated on 8 October 1967. It is built in an Art Deco style.

== History ==
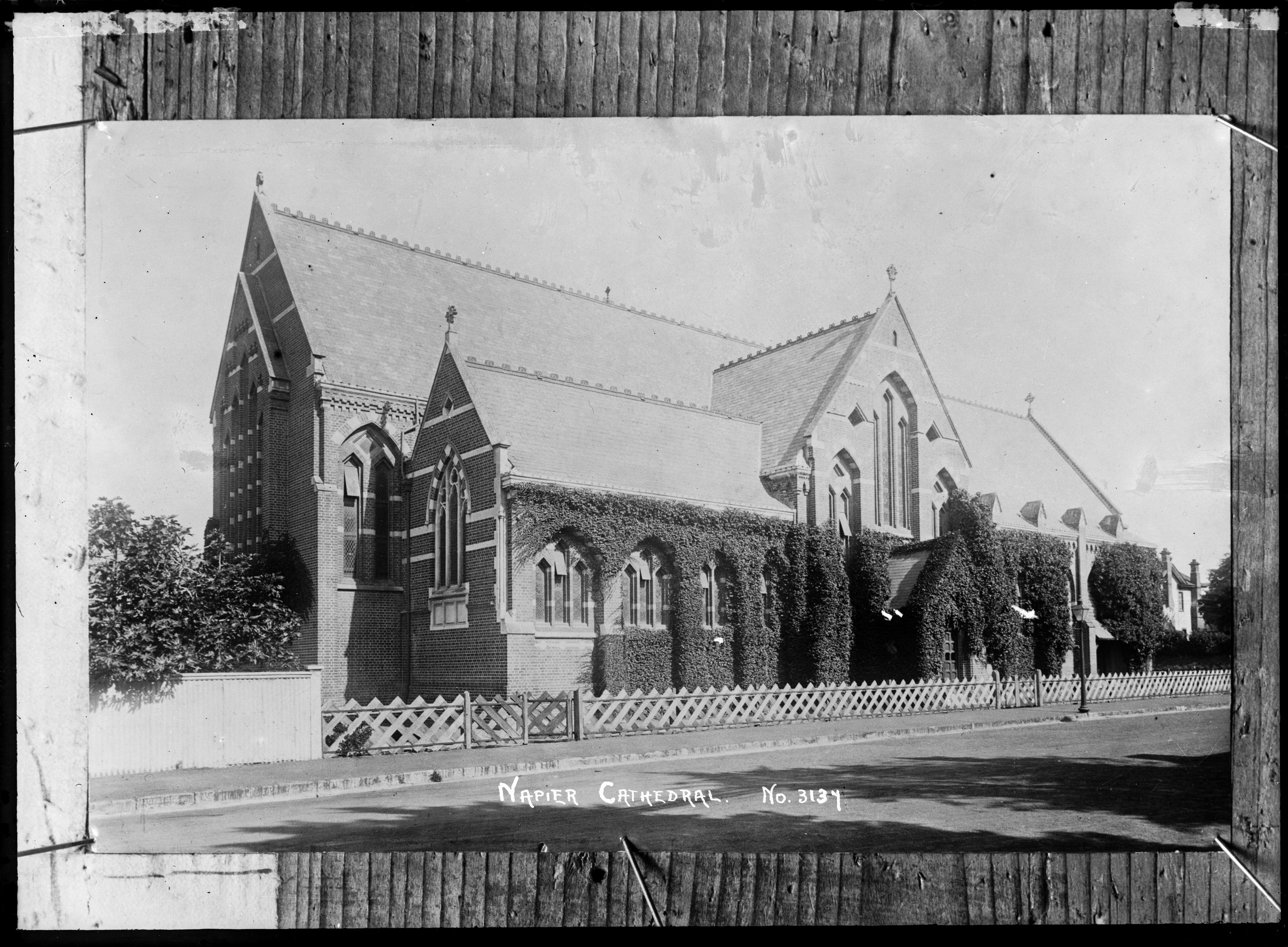
Waiapu Cathedral, c. 1910s

The present-day building replaced an earlier cathedral that was destroyed by the 1931 Hawke's Bay earthquake. Begun in 1886, consecrated in December 1888, and largely complete by 1890, the original cathedral of St John was a brick construction designed by Christchurch architect Benjamin Mountfort. Two lives were lost in the cathedral as a result of the 1931 earthquake. Edith Barry was trapped beneath fallen beams, and was euthanized as flames from the post-earthquake conflagration approached the building. Kate Williams died the following day of injuries sustained in the quake.

Following the total destruction of the first cathedral a temporary building was erected on the site, standing from 1931 until it was closed in 1960.

The current building is widely regarded as a fine example of Art Deco architecture. The design was largely drawn up by Napier architect Kingwell Malcolm, of the firm Malcolm and Sweet, following the untimely death of the selected architect R. S. D. Harman. The stained glass windows were designed by Wellington artist Beverley Shore Bennett.

== Bishopric ==
The Very Rev'd Dr Michael Godfrey, who was installed as Dean by Bishop David Rice in October 2013, was dismissed by Bishop Hedge in May 2016, following allegations that he had committed adultery twenty five years previously. Godfrey did not deny the allegations, but appealed the dismissal, and was reinstated by order of the national Anglican Appeals Tribunal. Bishop Hedge formally apologised to Dr Godfrey and his family but Godfrey elected not to return to the position. Godfrey went on to be Ministry Educator and an archdeacon in the Anglican Diocese of Dunedin.

The Very Rev'd Di Woods was appointed Dean in May 2022, following the retirement of The Very Rev'd Ian Render.. She stepped down in 2025 and was succeeded by The Very Rev'd Alister Hendery.

== List of vicars and deans ==
From 1889 the Vicar of Napier was also Dean of Waiapu.

- 1859–1863 The Rev'd H. W. St. Hill
- 1863 The Rev'd Dr C. J. Abraham Locum tenens while also Bishop of Wellington; see Charles Abraham (bishop of Wellington)
- 1864–1867 The Rev'd Dr L. Saywell
- 1867–1877 The Rev'd J. Townsend
- 1878–1905 The Very Rev'd de B. Hovell
- 1906–1929 The Very Rev'd F. Mayne
- 1929–1944 The Very Rev'd J. B. Brocklehurst
- 1944–1961 The Very Rev'd O. S. O. Gibson
- 1961–1963 The Very Rev'd E. W. R. Guymer
- 1964–1973 The Very Rev'd H. A. Childs
- 1973–1980 The Very Rev'd B. N. Davis (later Brian Davis (bishop) Bishop of Waikato, Bishop of Wellington, and Archbishop of New Zealand)
- 1980–1984 The Very Rev'd Dr D. J. Coles (later David Coles (bishop) Bishop of Christchurch)
- 1984–1991 The Very Rev'd M. J. Mills (later Murray Mills (bishop) Bishop of Waiapu)
- 1991–2003 The Very Rev'd N. A. Hendery
- 2004–2013 The Very Rev'd Dr H. E. Jacobi MNZM (first female dean of a New Zealand cathedral)
- 2013–2017 The Very Rev'd Dr M. J. H. Godfrey
- 2017– 2021 The Very Rev'd I. P. Render
- 2022–2025 The Very Rev'd D. Woods
- 2025-2026 The Very Rev'd A. Hendery served as Acting Dean until a permanent dean was installed in August 2026.
- 2026 - present The Very Reverend Ruihana Paenga took up permanent appointment in August 2026.

== Music team ==
Waiapu Cathedral hosts a choir, and one of the finest pipe organs in New Zealand, which has recently undergone a complete restoration. It is the fifth organ on the site, and has received a major re-build by the South Island Organ Company in 2012/3. The organ, featuring more than 3700 pipes, is now the largest church organ in New Zealand. Gary Bowler, who was New Zealand's longest serving Anglican cathedral organist, served as Director of Music from April 1981 to December 2014. James Mist was Director of Music from July 2015 until early 2017. Anthony Tattersall, formerly organist and choir leader at Blackburn Cathedral, is the current Director of Music.

== Sources ==
- Grant, S. W. (1986). The Resurrection and the Life: a Centennial History of the Cathedrals of St John the Evangelist 1886–1986.
