= Anglican Diocese of Waiapu =

Anglican Church diocese in New Zealand

Diocese of Waiapu
- Arms of the Diocese of Waiapu
- Incumbent; Andrew Hedge
- Style: The Right Reverend

Location
- Country: New Zealand
- Territory: North Island
- Ecclesiastical province: Aotearoa, New Zealand and Polynesia
- Headquarters: Napier
- Coordinates: 39°29′40″S 176°54′59″E

Information
- First holder: William Williams
- Formation: 1858
- Denomination: Anglican
- Cathedral: Saint John's Cathedral

Current leadership
- Parent church: Anglican Communion
- Major Archbishop: Primate of New Zealand; Pīhopa Mātāmua
- Bishop: Andrew Hedge

Website
- www.waiapu.com

The Diocese of Waiapu is one of the 13 dioceses and hui amorangi (Māori bishoprics) of the Anglican Church in Aotearoa, New Zealand and Polynesia. The Diocese covers the area around the East Coast of the North Island of New Zealand, including Tauranga, Taupō, Gisborne, Hastings and Napier. It is named for the Waiapu River.

The Diocese was established in 1858. The seat of the Bishop is the Waiapu Cathedral of Saint John the Evangelist, Napier.

Andrew Hedge is the current bishop, having been installed on St Luke's Day, 18 October 2014.

== List of bishops ==
The following individuals have served as the Bishop of Waiapu, or any precursor title:

Bishops of Waiapu
Ordinal	Officeholder	Term start	Term end	Notes
1	William Williams	1859	1876	
2	Edward Stuart	1877	1894	
3	Leonard Williams	1895	1909	Son of William Williams
4	Alfred Averill	1910	1914	
5	William Sedgwick	1914	1929	From 1928 until the 1970s, the Bishop of Aotearoa was a suffragan bishop of Waiapu
6	Herbert Williams	1930	1937	Grandson of William Williams
7	George Gerard	1938	1944	
8	George Cruickshank	1945	1946	
9	Norman Lesser	1947	1971	Also Archbishop of New Zealand from 1961
10	Paul Reeves	1971	1979	
11	Ralph Matthews	1979	1983	
12	Peter Atkins	1983	1990	
13	Murray Mills	1991	2002	
14	John Bluck	2002	2008	
15	David Rice	2008	2014	Translated as Bishop of San Joaquin, USA
16	Andrew Hedge	18 October 2014	incumbent	

== Archdeaconries ==
=== Archdeacons of Waiapu ===
- 1842-1859 Ven William Williams (Consecrated the First Bishop of the Diocese)
- 1862-1894 Ven William Leonard Williams (Consecrated the Third Bishop of the Diocese)
- 1907-1930 Ven Herbert William Williams (Consecrated the Sixth Bishop of the Diocese)
- 1930-1949 Ven Matthew William Butterfield
- 1949-1954 Ven Alfred Francis Hall
- 1954-1970 Ven Arthur Robert Hampton Morris

=== Archdeacons of Tauranga ===
- 1843-1884 Ven Alfred Nesbit Brown
- 1910-1914 Ven Charles Archibald Tisdall
- 1916-1921 Ven Charles Lawrence Tuke
- 1921-1936 Ven Frederick William Chatterton
- 1936-1965 Ven Reginald Hodgson

-Renamed Archdeacon of Tauranga City & Coast

- 2025-Current Ven Peter Bargh

=== Archdeacons of Hawkes Bay ===
- 1888-1907 Ven Samuel Williams
- 1907-1918 Ven David Ruddock
- 1919-1926 Ven William John Simkin
- 1926-1929 Ven Joseph Broadhurst Brocklehurst
- 1930-1943 Ven Kenneth Edward Maclean
- 1944-1954 Ven Joseph Broadhurst Brocklehurst
- 1955-1968 Ven Stephen Francis Newcome Waymouth
- Ven David Van Oeveren OStJ

-Renamed Archdeacon for Hawkes Bay City & Hawkes Bay Coast

- 2025- Ven Alan Burnet
