= Hulme Court =

Historical place in New Zealand

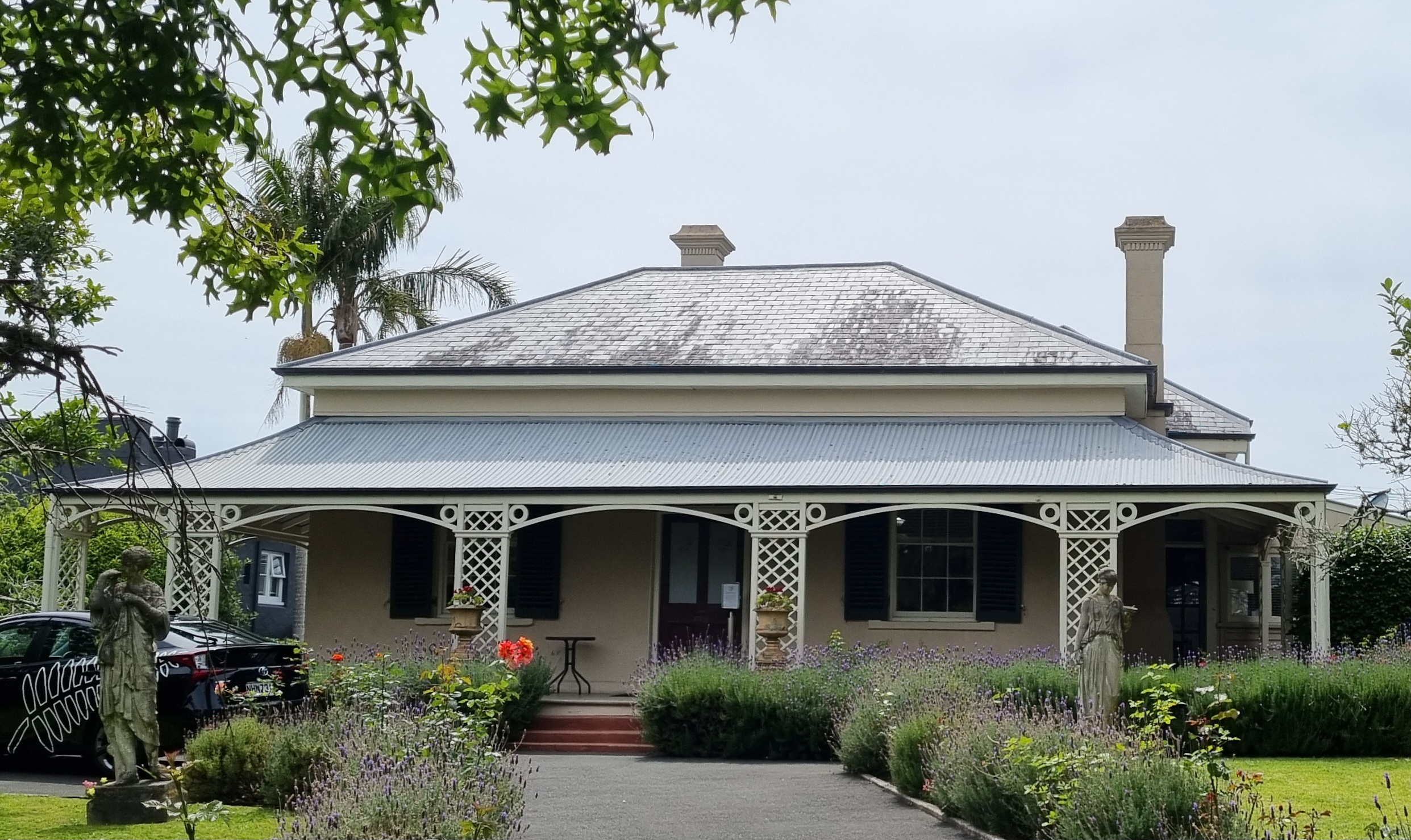

General information
- Architectural style: Regency architecture
- Location: 350 Parnell Road, Parnell, Auckland, New Zealand
- Coordinates: 36°51′25.68″S 174°46′56.11″E

Heritage New Zealand – Category 1
- Designated: 6 June 1983
- Reference no.: 19

Hulme Court is a category 1 historic place in Auckland, New Zealand. It is thought to be the oldest surviving house in Auckland and the oldest dwelling still standing on its original site.

== History ==
In 1843, Hulme Court was built for Sir Frederick Whitaker, later the Premier of New Zealand. It is not known who the architect of Hulme Court was, however, suggestions have been made that it could have been an engineer that Whitaker was working with.

It was later occupied by William Hulme, Commander of British Troops in New Zealand, after whom the house is now named. He bought the home for £610 in 1846. It was then sold following his death in 1855 to Thomas Russell and William Aicken who subdivided the land that the house was a part of.

During the 1850s, it acted as a temporary Government House for Governor Thomas Gove Browne. It was also rented for a time by Bishop George Selwyn. His wife, Sarah, described the library as "the most pleasantest room in New Zealand."

Sir Francis Dillon Bell bought three of the plots of land in 1863, including Hulme Court, and lived there until 1872. In 1872, Bell sold the property to the family of Frederick Ireland, who lived there into the early 1900s. In the early 1910s, it was home to Dr. Alexander Kinder, who also had his surgery based out of Hulme Court. Later on in the 1910s, it was home to W. P. Goodhue, the chief teller of the Bank of New Zealand, who died at Hulme Court in 1919.

In the 1920s and 1930s, it was the residence of Walter Joseph Macklow, one of the Macklow Brothers, timber merchants at Mechanics Bay. In 1941, it was bought by the Clark family, immigrants from Glasgow. From 1951 until its sale in 2011, it was owned by the Maguire family. During the 1950s and 1960s, it underwent several modifications and, at one point, acted as a panel-beating and paint shop.

In January 2012, a restoration project of Hulme Court was begun, and was completed in April 2013. The restoration work, designed by Matthews & Matthews Architects, included structural upgrading, replacement and repairs of the roof and external claddings.

== Description ==
It is a single-storey Regency style plastered bluestone house. The bluestone walls are 300mm thick that were originally plastered with lime. It has a hipped slate roof, and shuttered sash windows. On three of the four sides, there are trellised verandahs. There is a cellar beneath the house and an attic space.

There are stables and servants quarters at the side of the house, built from kauri timber. The additions in the 1950s and 1960s were made in timber rather than stone.

Archaeological investigations were conducted as part of the 2012 restorations showed previous existence of a well, and outbuilding for carriages and stables. Other finishes such as the original kauri roof singles, decorative linoleum mats, wallpaper, tongue and groove linings were also uncovered as part of these investigations.
