= Parnell, New Zealand =

Parnell
- Suburb
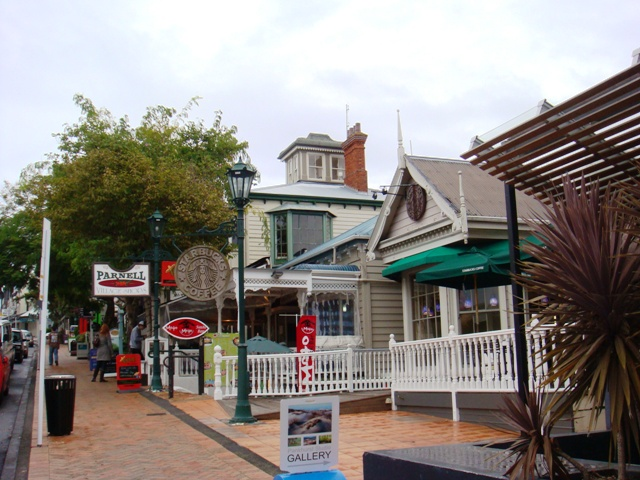
- Parnell Road shops
- Interactive map of Parnell
- Coordinates: 36.8572°S 174.7816°E
- Country: New Zealand
- City: Auckland
- Local authority: Auckland Council
- Electoral ward: Ōrākei ward
- Local board: Waitematā Local Board
- Established: 1841

Area
  - Land: 288 ha (710 acres)

Population (June 2025)
  - Total: 8,390
  - Density: 2,910/km^{2} (7,550/sq mi)
- Train stations: Parnell Railway Station

Auckland CBD	(Mechanics Bay)	(Judges Bay)
Auckland CBD	Parnell	(Hobson Bay)
Grafton	Newmarket	Remuera

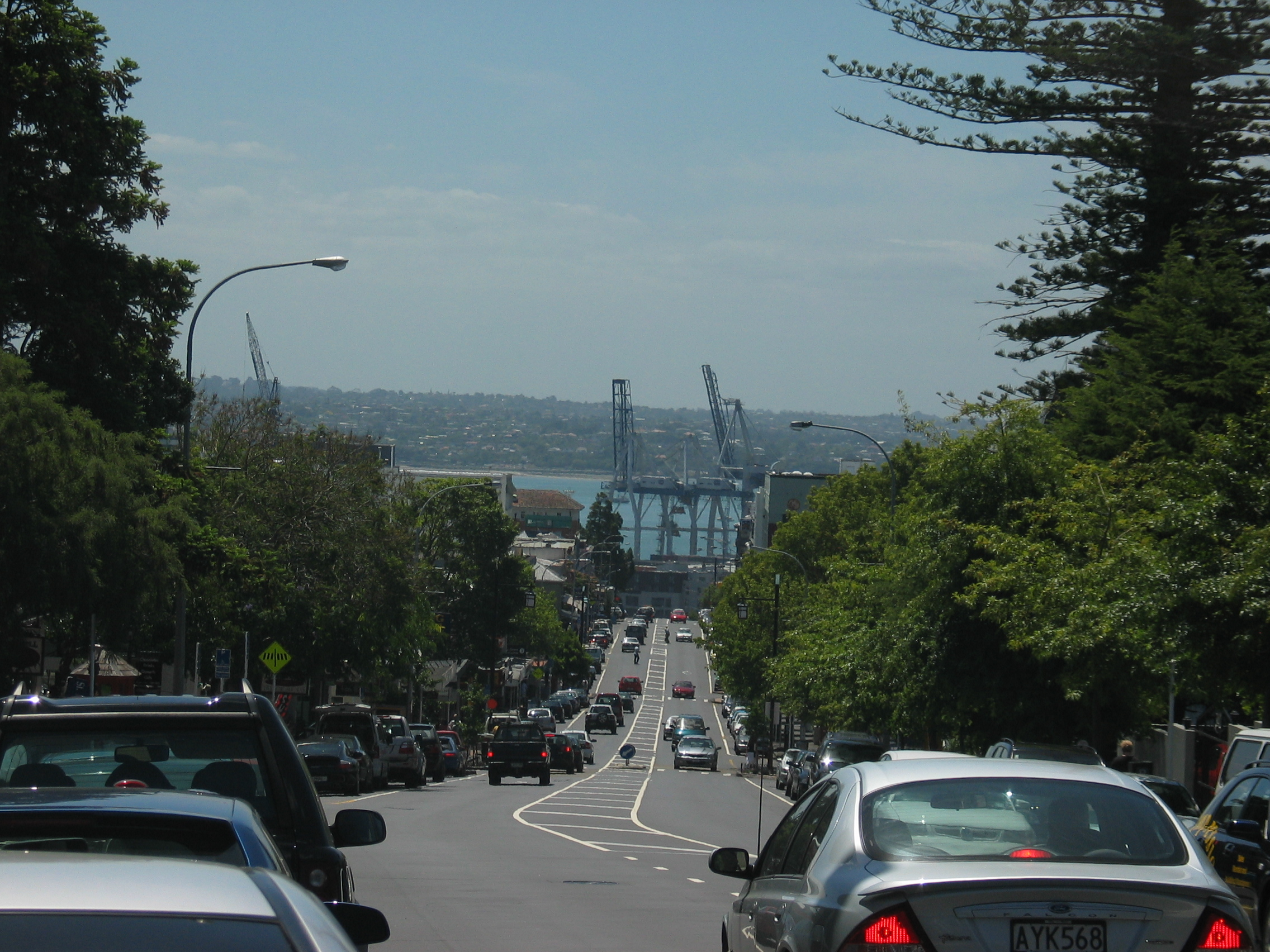
Looking north-north-west down Parnell Road, Ports of Auckland and Waitematā Harbour visible in the distance

Ewelme Cottage in 1867

Parnell (Māori: Panēra) is a suburb of Auckland, New Zealand. It is one of New Zealand's most affluent suburbs, consistently ranked within the top three wealthiest, and is often billed as Auckland's "oldest suburb" since it dates from the earliest days of the European settlement of Auckland in 1841. It is characterised by its mix of tree-lined streets with large estates; redeveloped industrial zones with Edwardian town houses and 1920s bay villas; and its hilly topography that allows for views of the port, the Waitematā Harbour, Rangitoto Island and the Auckland Domain. To its west lies the Auckland Domain, to the south Newmarket, and to the north the Ports of Auckland.

Parnell Rise and Parnell Road make up the main road through Parnell. Parnell Rise leads to the central business district to the west; Parnell Road runs from Parnell Rise uphill to the top of the suburb, and then bends almost 90 degrees and continues towards Newmarket in the south-east. Parnell Road ends at the intersection of George and Sarawia Streets, where it becomes Broadway. Early European settlers knew Parnell Road as "Manukau Road" until well after the formation of Khyber Pass Road in 1845.

== History ==
The Parnell area has a long history of settlement by Tāmaki Māori. Point Resolution was the location of Taurarua pā, occupied by the Waiōhua confederation. The name Taurarua ("annoying chant") refers to a battle between Waiōhua and Ngāti Whātua where Waiohua warriors goaded Ngāti Whātua to attack using mocking chants. This was one of the final strongholds of this iwi before it was taken by Ngāti Whātua in the 1740s, when twin brother chiefs Humataitai and Hupipi were defeated by Ngāti Whātua. Prior to European settlement, Parnell was occupied by Ngāti Whātua-o-Ōrākei. The Domain was known as Pukekawa, which translates to 'hill of bitter memories.' This is in reference to the battles that occurred between Ngāpuhi and Ngāti Whatua during the Musket Wars. The Government acquired the area from Ngāti Whātua as part of a 3,000-acre (12 km^{2}) land deal in 1840.

Robert Tod purchased 3 acres (1.2 ha) from the Government on 1 September 1841. He quickly subdivided it into 36 sections, which he advertised for sale on 4 September 1841 as the "Village of Parnell". In the early 1830s Tod had supplied copies of the Bible to a Plymouth Brethren mission in Baghdad, one of whose members was John Vesey Parnell. Streets in the village of Parnell were named Groves, Cronin and Calman after other missionaries to Baghdad, Anthony Norris Groves, Edward Cronin and Erasmus Scott Calman. These were later renamed Eglon, Fox and Marston Streets.

== Governance ==
=== Local government ===
The Parnell Road District was formed 13 February 1863 but did not operate until 1868. In 1877 the road district was dissolved and the Borough of Parnell was constituted. In 1913 the borough was amalgamated into the City of Auckland.

The following served as mayors of the Borough of Parnell until its incorporation into Auckland City:

	Name	Term
1	Henry Matthew Nation	1877–1877
2	J. W. Melton	1877–1878
3	William Coleman	1878–1879
4	J. W. Robinson	1879–1880
5	J. Friar Clark	1880–1881
6	Robert Walker	1881–1883
7	D. H. McKenzie	1883–1885
8	Jonathan Winks	1885–1887
9	Seymour Thorne George	1887–1888
10	H. B. Sealy	1888–1891
(9)	Seymour Thorne George	1891–1892
11	John McCabe	1892–1894
12	George S. Kissling	1894–1895
13	Spencer Von Sturmer	1895–1896
14	Joseph Thornes	1896–1897
15	N. W. Pollard	1897–1898
16	Hugh Campbell	1898–1903
17	John Fitt	1903–1906
18	George W. Basley	1906–1909
19	Richard Stevenson Briggs	1909–1913

Parnell forms part of the Ōrākei Ward within Auckland Council.

=== Electorate ===
Parnell forms part of the Epsom Electorate for parliamentary representation. Parnell represents approximately 20% of the population in the electorate. The Member of Parliament for Epsom, David Seymour, represents ACT New Zealand.

== Demographics ==
Parnell covers 2.88 km^{2} (1.11 sq mi) and had an estimated population of 8,390 as of June 2025, with a population density of 2,913 people per km^{2}.

Historical population
Year	Pop.	±% p.a.
2006	6,519	—
2013	7,095	+1.22%
2018	7,563	+1.29%
2023	7,788	+0.59%

Parnell had a population of 7,788 in the 2023 New Zealand census, an increase of 225 people (3.0%) since the 2018 census, and an increase of 693 people (9.8%) since the 2013 census. There were 3,678 males, 4,059 females and 48 people of other genders in 3,087 dwellings. 7.1% of people identified as LGBTIQ+. The median age was 36.2 years (compared with 38.1 years nationally). There were 756 people (9.7%) aged under 15 years, 2,376 (30.5%) aged 15 to 29, 3,378 (43.4%) aged 30 to 64, and 1,275 (16.4%) aged 65 or older.

People could identify as more than one ethnicity. The results were 71.6% European (Pākehā); 6.9% Māori; 2.6% Pasifika; 24.3% Asian; 4.7% Middle Eastern, Latin American and African New Zealanders (MELAA); and 1.4% other, which includes people giving their ethnicity as "New Zealander". English was spoken by 96.8%, Māori language by 1.3%, Samoan by 0.3%, and other languages by 29.2%. No language could be spoken by 1.3% (e.g. too young to talk). New Zealand Sign Language was known by 0.3%. The percentage of people born overseas was 41.4, compared with 28.8% nationally.

Religious affiliations were 30.9% Christian, 1.6% Hindu, 1.4% Islam, 0.3% Māori religious beliefs, 1.8% Buddhist, 0.4% New Age, 0.5% Jewish, and 1.7% other religions. People who answered that they had no religion were 55.5%, and 6.1% of people did not answer the census question.

Of those at least 15 years old, 3,507 (49.9%) people had a bachelor's or higher degree, 2,631 (37.4%) had a post-high school certificate or diploma, and 891 (12.7%) people exclusively held high school qualifications. The median income was $54,500, compared with $41,500 nationally. 1,908 people (27.1%) earned over $100,000 compared to 12.1% nationally. The employment status of those at least 15 was that 3,483 (49.5%) people were employed full-time, 1,191 (16.9%) were part-time, and 237 (3.4%) were unemployed.

Individual statistical areas
Name	Area (km^{2})	Population	Density (per km^{2})	Dwellings	Median age	Median income
Parnell West	1.65	4,509	2,733	1,722	32.2 years	$44,300
Parnell East	1.23	3,276	2,663	1,368	44.3 years	$66,000
New Zealand					38.1 years	$41,500

== Notable buildings and landmarks ==
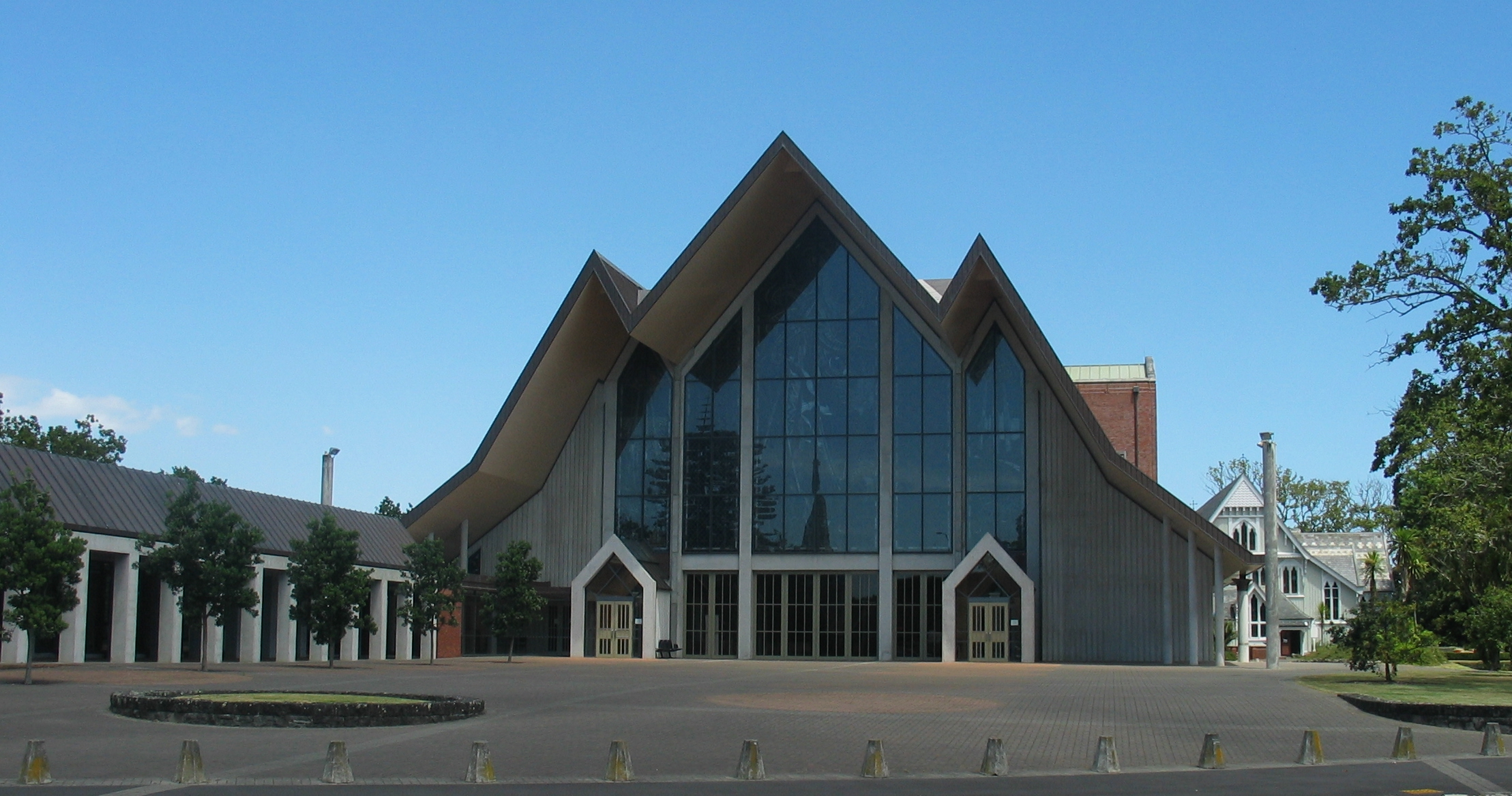
The Anglican Cathedral, with old St Mary's church behind it

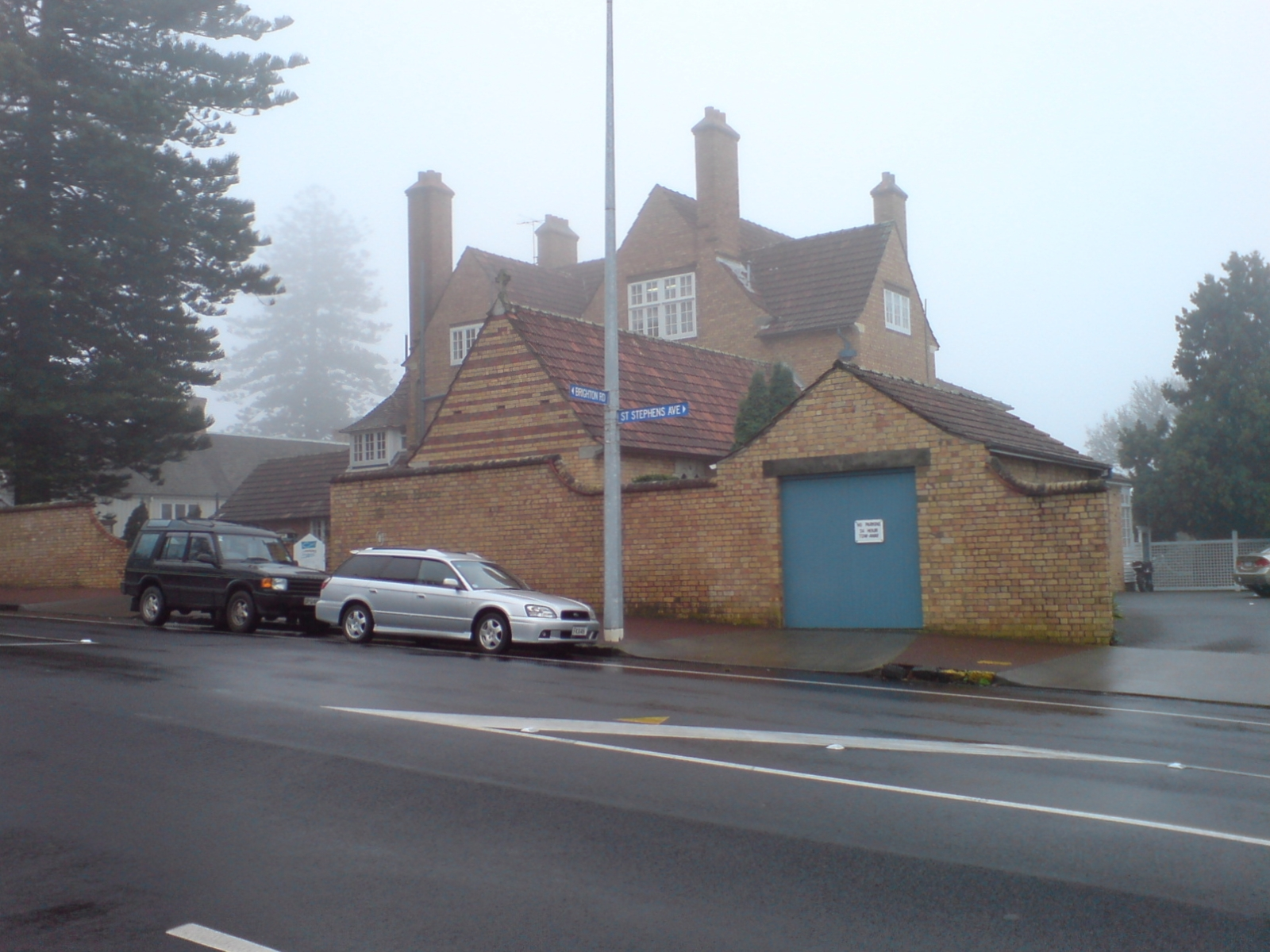
Neligan House, built for Bishop Neligan in 1908

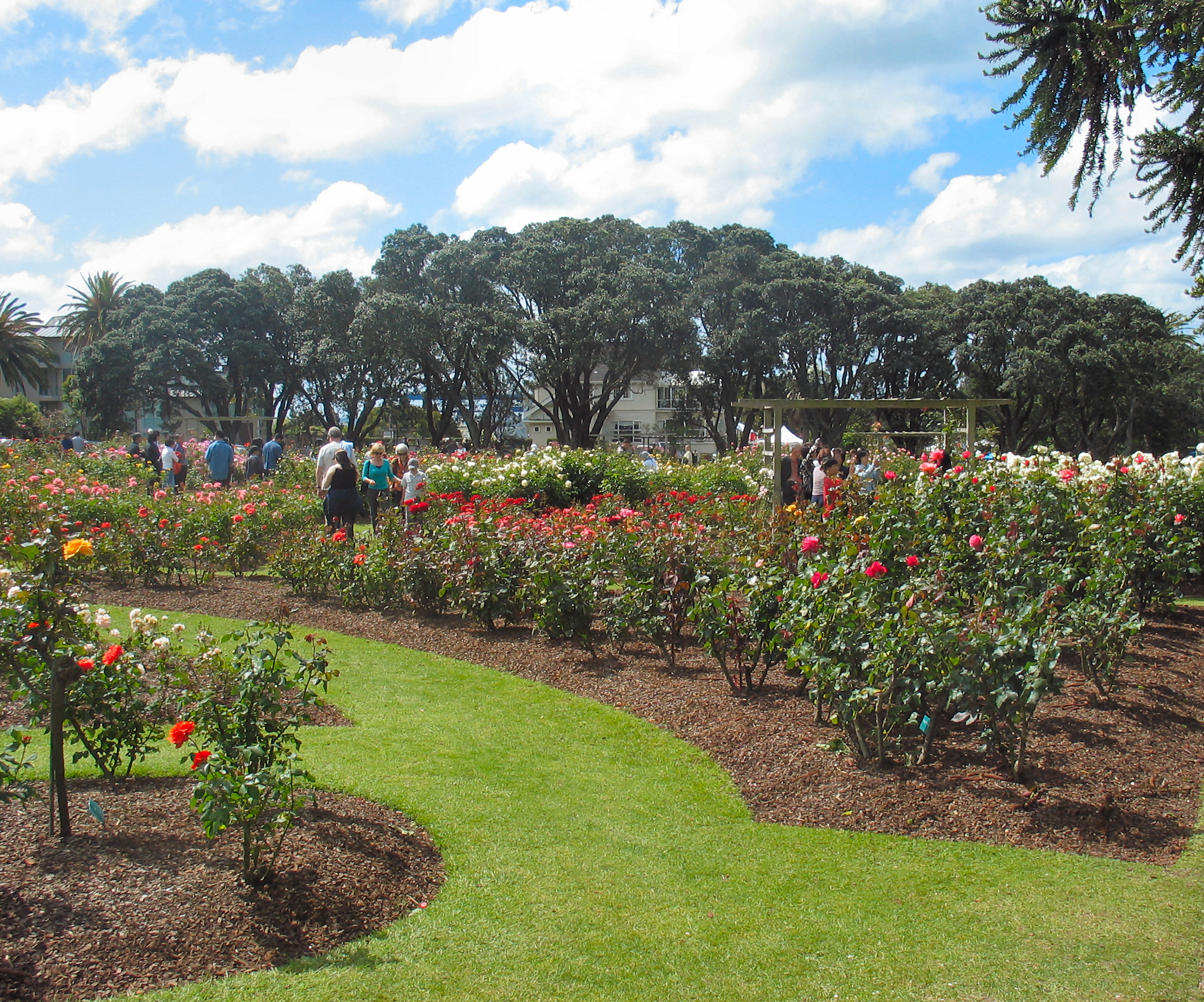
Parnell Rose Gardens during the 2006 Rose Festival

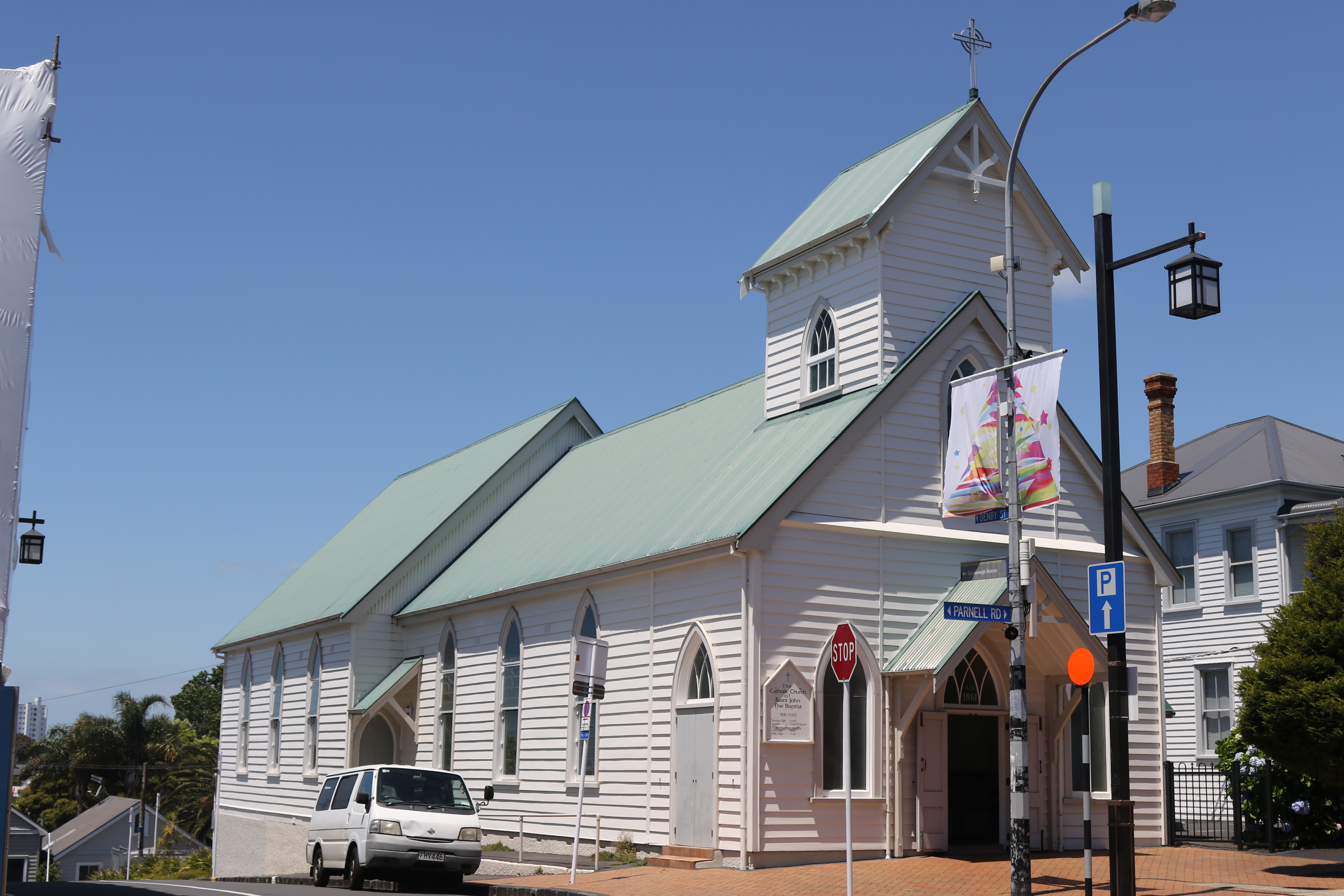
St John the Baptist's Church, Parnell

=== Lower Parnell Road ===
- The Swan Hotel, 31–35 Parnell Rise – constructed prior to 1856 and is one of the earliest timber public houses surviving in Auckland. Additions to the building date from the 1880s and were designed by Edward Bartley. This building originally stood directly on the foreshore. Historically this cove (now completely reclaimed) had been used by Maori to beach their waka; this usage continued after European settlement and part of the foreshore was demarcated as a Maori hostel (currently used by police Commercial Vehicle Safety Team [CVST] as a heavy vehicle weighbridge and compliance checkpoint).
- Parnell Rail Bridge – 19th century metal rail bridge on massive volcanic basalt rock piers. This structure allows the rail line to cross over Parnell Road without disrupting traffic.
- Mayfair Apartments – 1930s brick Neo-Georgian highrise apartment block.
- Windsor Castle Hotel, 144 Parnell Road – a hotel which dates from the 1850s. The hotel was remodelled in the 1880s after the architect R. MacKay Fripp was commissioned to convert the existing hotel into a larger pub; the existing facade was built during this conversion.
- Former Heard Factory – three storeyed art-deco style industrial building built for a confectionery manufacturer.
- Heard Park – this land was donated to the city in 1953 by the Heard family, the owners of Heards Candy, the adjacent large Art-Deco Heards building.
- Church of St John the Baptist (Catholic), 204 Parnell Road – this church was designed by Edward Mahoney and formally instituted by Bishop Pompallier in 1861; it is the only Catholic church in Parnell and the oldest Catholic church in the city. The Sisters of Mercy had a convent here and a Catholic primary school ran for a century, until it closed due to falling rolls in the 1950s.

=== Parnell Road ===
- Whitby Lodge, 330 Parnell Road – erected by the early 1870s, Whitby Lodge is one of few surviving colonial dwellings in Auckland constructed of the local volcanic stone basalt. Possibly erected as early as 1848 or 1852. It is possible that Fraser erected a building on the site at the time of his purchase in 1864, or improved an existing structure. The roof beams are not supported by the masonry walls, suggesting this is an earlier wooden structure which was subsequently clad in stone. The building was occupied by the Consulate General of the Cook Islands as an Embassy from 1978 until 1 December 1994.
- Hulme Court, 350 Parnell Road – a stone-built, Regency-style house surrounded by trellised verandahs, was built in 1843 for Sir Fredrick Whitaker; it is the second oldest surviving house in Auckland, and the oldest documented dwelling still standing on its original site. In its early years, the house was occupied by a succession of notable people including George Selwyn, Governor Gore Browne, who used it as a temporary Government House in the 1850s, and Sir Francis Dillon Bell, who was the Minister of Native Affairs and an advisor to Governor Grey, and Colonel Hulme, who acted as commander of British Army troops in New Zealand, and after whom the house is named.
- Former Parnell Public Library – corner of Parnell Road and St Georges Bay Road. 1920s Neo-Classical building.

=== Saint Stephen's Corner ===
- The Anglican Cathedral, which stands at the top of the hill, is the most distinctive feature of Parnell. The cathedral serves as a replacement to the original St Mary's Cathedral, which was demolished in 1888 after standing for just 28 years. The current building has two parts: the brick choir and body of the church date from about 1960 and represent a "modern" simplified version of Gothic. This closely resembles Guildford Cathedral, by Edward Maufe, completed in 1961. The massing of the forms, the detailing of the masonry and the smooth expanses of plain brick occur in both buildings. Over the transept entrance stands a bronze sculpture of the Archangel Michael defeating the Devil, very similar to the Epstein sculpture of the same subject on Coventry Cathedral (finished 1962). The front part of the church, built in the 1990s to the design of Professor Richard Toy and John Sinclair, recalls the new Coventry Cathedral built after World War II. It features large stained-glass windows, illuminated by the sunlight at certain times of the day. Māori motifs and symbols appear in the newer part of the building, which awaits a large spire to finish the composition.
- St Mary's Cathedral Church – Next to this building stands the smaller St Mary's, a wooden neo-Gothic structure which dates from 1885 and served as the pro-cathedral after the demolition of the earlier St Mary's and until the building of the current cathedral. Designed by B.W Mountfort, it stood on the other side of Parnell Road until the 1980s.
- Bishopscourt – St Stephens Avenue. Also known as Selwyn Court, this is the residence of the Anglican Bishop of Auckland. This wooden gothic house, designed by Frederick Thatcher, has a chapel and an octagonal turret. Bishop Selwyn and his wife moved here in May 1865.
- Neligan House – St Stephens Avenue. Fine Arts & Crafts brick residence built for Bishop Neligan in 1908 by Noel Bamford & Hector Pierce.
- St Stephens House – St Stephens Avenue. Wooden Edwardian mansion, now used for Anglican social services.
- The Old Deanery – St Stephens Avenue – A Frederick Thatcher-designed neo-Tudor house built from volcanic scoria rock, probably by Benjamin Strange. This is probably the birthplace of the novelist Hugh Walpole whose father was Dean of the Cathedral at the time.

=== Northern area of Parnell ===
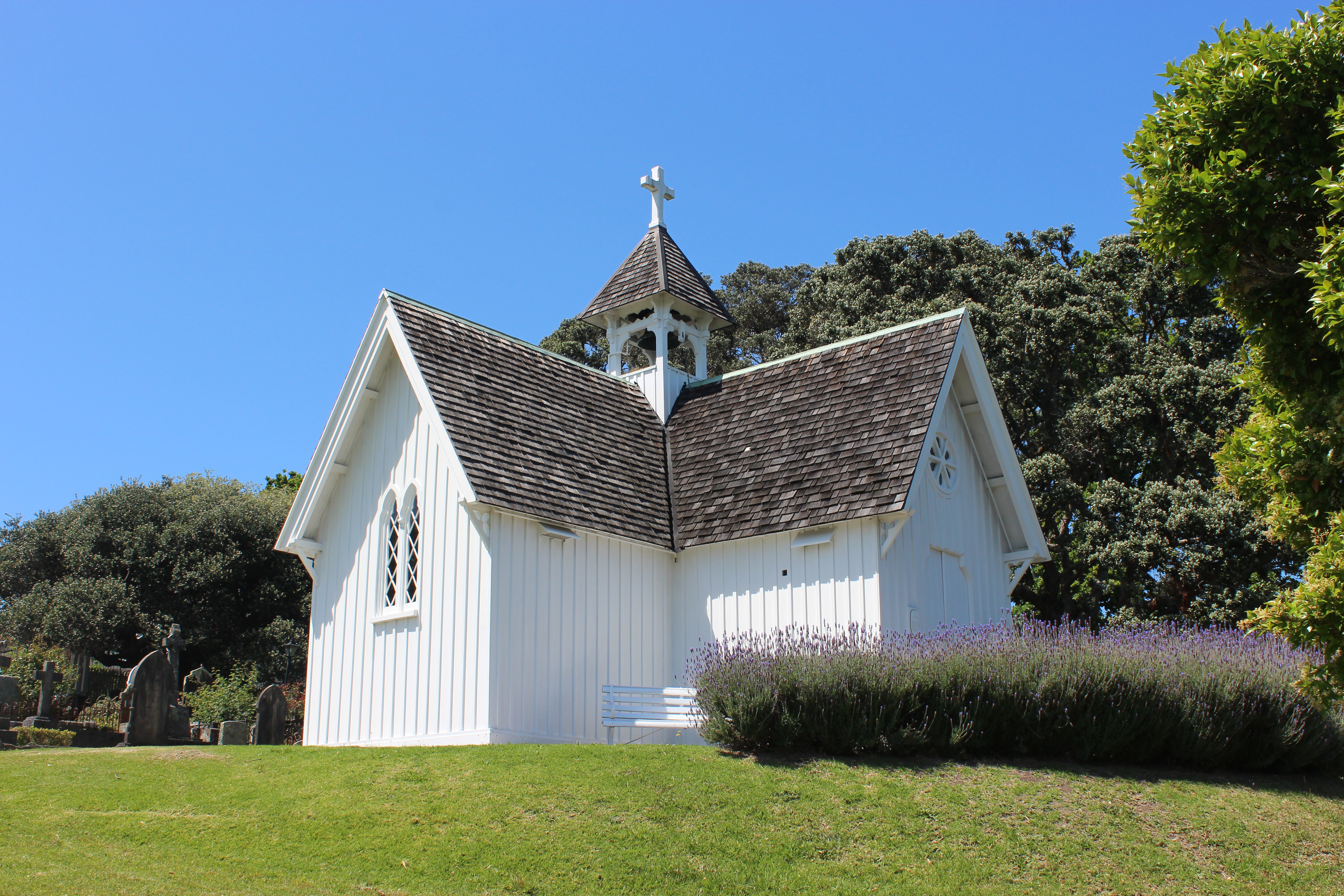
St Stephen's Chapel

- Tower House, 33 St Stephen's Avenue – landmark brick mansion from 1904 with distinctive turret. The residence of A.E.T. Devore, Mayor of Auckland 1886–1889.
- Parnell Rose Gardens Dove Myer Robinson Park, 85 to 87 Gladstone Road, Parnell – this park was created in 1913 as Parnell Park – (Parnell amalgamated with Auckland that year) largely as a result of the activities of Auckland Mayor Christopher Parr (later Sir James Parr). It was renamed in the 1970s to honour the popular and longest-serving mayor of Auckland, Sir Dove Myer Robinson. The park was created out of the gardens of several large estates which occupied the point in the late 19th century; primarily that of Sir John Logan Campbell and Justice Gillies; it enjoys expansive views of the Waitematā Harbour. This area consists of a number of different areas; the cottage style Nancy Steen Garden popular for wedding ceremonies; sweeping on down to Judges Bay and the salt water Parnell Baths. The Parnell Rose Garden is a major city attraction, containing beautifully maintained rose beds, and leads on to extended open spaces and areas with specimen trees. The park is also home to some remarkable native trees – the oldest manuka and largest pohutukawa in Auckland. There are car parking facilities and artworks at the Fred Ambler Lookout, an open space that overlooks the container terminal.
- Judges Bay – so-called because in 1841 Judge William Martin and Attorney General William Swainson arrived in Auckland with houses in prefabricated sections. Swainson built on the west side and the Martins on the east of this bay. Known as Taurarua 'the two ropes' it is thought that this name referred to the two administrators of British justice. From here Martin and his neighbour Swainson would commute to work in Auckland by rowboat; they employed Māori boatmen who were supplied with uniforms. Lady Martin taught English to the local Māori and late in her life wrote of her experiences in early colonial New Zealand.
- Parnell Baths, the largest saltwater pools in New Zealand. Originally opened in 1914, and renovated in 1950 to a modernist design by the office of the City Architect Tibor Donner. It owes much to the AA-trained architect, Ralph Wilkinson, who was then working in Donner's office. Ewen Wainscott was site architect. noted for murals by James Turkington The complex won an NZIA Gold Medal in 1957.
- St Stephens Church and graveyard – important early Anglican Chapel and cemetery.

=== Southern area of Parnell ===
- Kinder House – scoria residence built for the Rev John Kinder (1819–1903)in 1857, of volcanic scoria rock by Benjamin Strange. Now a museum, Kinder House is open to the public weekdays from 11 am to 3 pm. There is a modest entry charge. Various booklets and postcards are on sale.
- Ewelme Cottage – the kauri-constructed Ewelme Cottage has a link with the Anglican community in Auckland, the dwelling designed and built by the Reverend Vicesimus Lush (1817–1882) and his wife Blanche in 1863–64. Ewelme Cottage, was extended 18 years after it was originally built; it remained in family hands until 1968 when it became part of the New Zealand Historic Places Trust.
- Jubilee Building – The New Zealand Jubilee Institute for the Blind was founded in 1890 by John Abbott, merchant, who came to New Zealand in 1864. The Institute school had originally been established in an old boarding house in Parnell in 1889. A more permanent school was built in 1891 with money from a mayoralty fund set up to celebrate the Jubilee of Queen Victoria, resulting in the name "Jubilee Institute". This building burnt down in 1897. Between 1907 and 1909, handsome new brick buildings were built for the institute, designed by well-known architect Edward Bartley and built by W.Philcox and Sons. Additions in 1926 designed by Gummer and Ford provided for adult accommodation, a shop, workshops where the blind worked on various manufacturing projects, and a women's dormitory in 1927. The main building is now an Auckland City community centre and library, the subsidiary buildings are now used for a variety of purposes.
- Emerald Villa - a historic homestead at 4 Tohunga Crescent overlooking Hobson Bay, built by Willian Lodge when this part of Parnell was called Emerald Hill. It is a significant example of the transitional phase from Georgian to Victorian architecture and is heritage-listed.

During the early 1970s the suburb became rather dilapidated. Les Harvey, a local businessman, bought up several properties cheaply and created "Parnell Village", encouraging others to follow his lead. This revitalised the area as a weekend tourist shopping destination. This involved Parnell re-inventing itself as a set of "Ye Olde Worlde Shoppes". As many other Victorian buildings underwent demolition in Auckland at the time, period materials became available cheaply, and the buildings of Parnell village emerged altered, extended and tarted up in a somewhat fanciful but fun ersatz Victorian style. Much of this restyling remains in evidence within Parnell Village and around the Parnell Road shopping area, partly because of the ongoing ownership of the Harvey family's company, City Construction.

Along the upper part of Parnell Road stand a number of 19th-century houses, most of them now used by law firms, accountancy firms, shops, and a few restaurants. The lower part of Parnell has a larger concentration of Edwardian retail buildings, including a number of fashionable boutiques, nightclubs and bars. The streets to each side of Parnell Road remain mainly residential in character, with some townhouses and apartments, especially towards St Georges Bay Road.

At the bottom of Parnell Rise runs Beach Road, so-called because it ran around the beach-front of the now-reclaimed Mechanics Bay and Official Bay. St Georges Bay disappeared at the same time. Here stands the former Auckland Railway Station, an impressive brick 1930 structure, designed by Gummer and Ford. The City Fathers relocated the Auckland train terminus here from the bottom of Queen Street in 1930. The building ceased to operate as a station in 2003 when Britomart Transport Centre became the new Auckland terminus at the former Queen Street site.

== Parks ==
Parnell has several parks and reserves.

- Dove-Myer Robinson Park, more commonly known as the Parnell Rose Garden – this park was created in 1913 as Parnell Park. Parnell Park was created by combining land belonging to several large houses, one of which (the home of the Gillies family) which was retained as the tearooms. One of the other properties belonged to Sir John Logan Campbell whose house Killbryde was demolished in 1924. The park is distinguished by many mature trees which were planted by the previous private owners. The park was renamed for Sir Dove-Myer Robinson, the longest-serving mayor of Auckland, who served for 18 years. The Rose Gardens are popular for weddings and each year in November, the park is host to the Parnell Festival of Roses, which showcases New Zealand craft stalls, art exhibitions, music, strolling performers and thousands of roses. One portion of the garden is a collection of heritage roses collected by the late Nancy Steen, the Nancy Steen Garden. The entrance to the park is a War Memorial built in the 1920s of volcanic basalt composed of three massive arches. The park enjoys views over the Waitematā Harbour; its grounds blend with those of the adjacent historic Anglican St Stephen's Chapel & graveyard, Judges Bay Reserve and Point Resolution Park with its Parnell Swimming Baths.
- Point Resolution Park – located above the Parnell Swimming Baths and includes a walkway across the railway line and Tamaki Drive to connect with the Waitematā Harbour.
- Judges Bay Reserve at Judges Bay and the adjacent Parnell Swimming Baths provide saltwater bathing.
- St Stephen's Churchyard – one of Auckland's oldest cemeteries and the location of a Selwyn Church.
- Ayr Reserve – an area of largely native bush accessible from Ayr Street, Laurie, Avenue, Kenderdine Lane and Cathedral Place.
- Alberon Reserve – an area of native bush accessible from Alberon Street, Staffa Street and St Georges Bay Road.
- Scarborough Reserve – an area of Native bush accessible from Scarborough Terrace.
- Heard Park – located in the centre of Parnell Village. This land was donated to the city in 1953 by the Heard family, the owners of Heards Candy. The large Art-Deco Heards building is adjacent to the park, now no longer a working confectionery factory.
- Fraser Park – located at the western end of Parnell Road. This triangular piece of land was previously the location of Parnell School; its wooden school buildings were demolished in the 1950s.
- Carlaw Park – located in Parnell, was the home of rugby league football in Auckland from 1921 to 2002.
- Auckland Domain – arguably also part of Grafton, forms the westernmost edge of Parnell and houses extensive forest, the Auckland War Memorial Museum, and the Winter Gardens.
- Awatea Reserve - accessible from Waitoa Street and Awatea Road, an area of grass fringed with trees, and a view south-east from the steep bluffs above Hobson Bay.

== Infrastructure ==
Until 2017 Parnell never had a dedicated railway station. Parnell Railway Station was opened to the public in March 2017. Since 2026, it has been served by the South City Line. It was built near the Mainline Steam Depot at the west of the Parnell commercial area, and north of the Parnell Tunnel, which has been located beneath the suburb since 1873.

== Education ==
Parnell lies within easy reach of two universities (University of Auckland and Auckland University of Technology) and of some significant State secondary schools: Auckland Grammar School, Epsom Girls' Grammar School, St Peter's College and Baradene College of the Sacred Heart.

ACG Parnell College is a private composite school (years 1–13) with a roll of 1,963 as of July 2026.

Parnell District School is a state full primary school (years 1–8) with a roll of 520 as of July 2026.

Both these schools are coeducational. Rolls are as of July 2026.

== Notable residents ==
- William Martin (1807–1880), first Chief Justice of New Zealand – lived in Judges Bay – hence the name
- William Swainson 1809–1884, Attorney-General, member of the Executive and Legislative Councils, and writer – the other judge who lived in Judges Bay
- George Selwyn, bishop; resided in the Palace; Bishops Court in St Stephen's Ave or Neligan House next door
- Reverend John Kinder Anglican clergyman, watercolourist and early photographer. Kinder House, Ayr Street
- Reverend Vicesimus Lush (1817–1882) and his wife Blanche in 1863–64, Ewelme Cottage Ayr Street
- Sir Frederick Whitaker, lawyer and New Zealand Premier, built the house now known as Hulme Court
- Lieutenant Colonel William Hulme (1788–1855), Commander of British Troops in New Zealand, lived at Hulme Court, Parnell Road
- Governor Colonel Sir Thomas Gore Browne KCMG CB (1807–1887), Governor of New Zealand (1855–1861); used Hulme Court as a temporary Government House
- Sir Francis Dillon Bell, Minister of Native Affairs and advisor to Governor Grey – resided at Hulme Court
- Sir John Logan Campbell and Lady Campbell, lived on Gladstone road, the house Killbryde was demolished in 1924 and the land incorporated in the Parnell Rose Gardens
- Hugh Walpole, novelist; Walpole was born in Parnell, probably in the Anglican Deanery in St Stephen's Avenue
- Sir John Key, Prime Minister (2008–2016), lives on St Stephen's Avenue
- Harry Diddams (1864–1929), Mayor of Brisbane (1911, 1921–1924)
- Sir Harcourt Caughey KBE CSTJ (1911–1993), All Black and chief executive
- Peggy Spicer (1908–1984), painter
- Peter Hudson (1930–1992) and David Halls (1938–1993), television entertainers and chefs

== Panorama ==
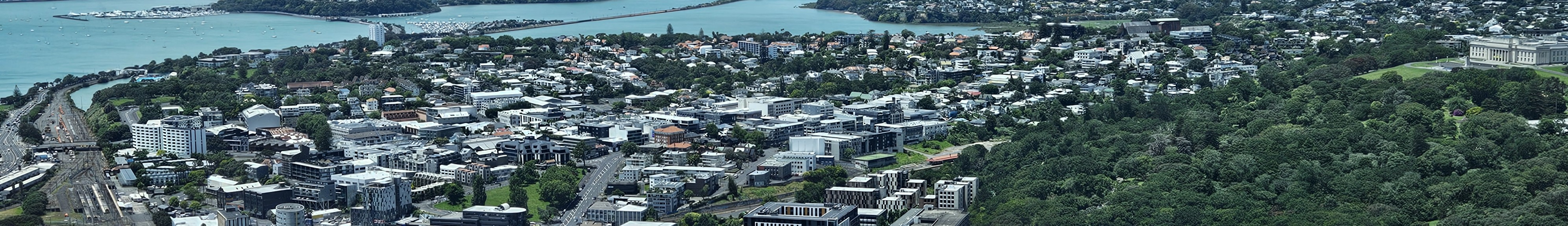
Panorama of Parnell, seen from the Sky Tower.
