= Parnell Baths =

Swimming pool in Auckland, New Zealand

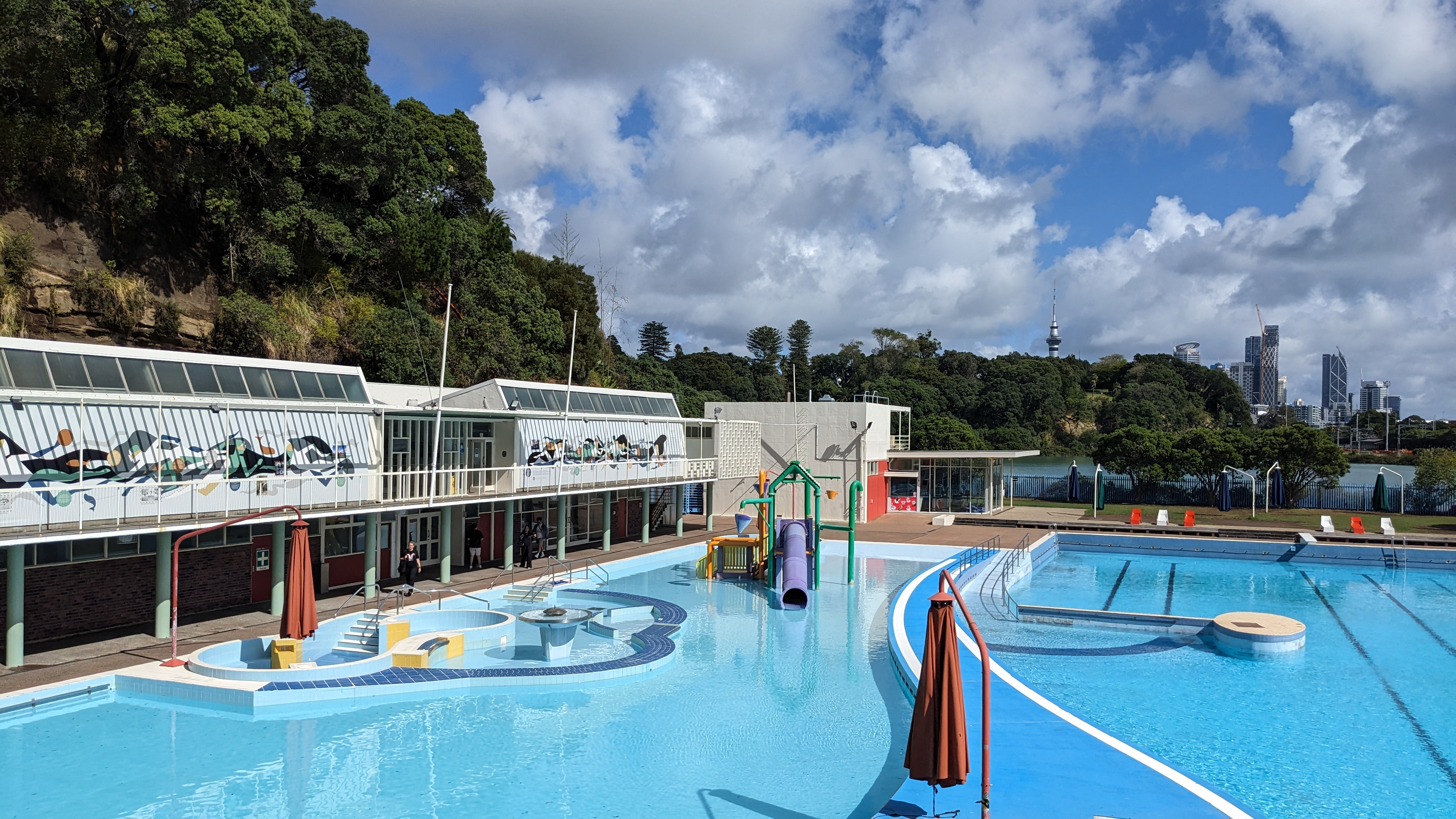
- The Parnell Baths in 2025
- Interactive map of Parnell Baths
- Address: 25 Judges Bay Road, Parnell, Auckland 1052
- Coordinates: 36.849°S 174.792°E

Construction
- Built: 1914; 112 years ago

The Parnell Baths are a historic swimming pool in Parnell, Auckland. The pools feature the largest saltwater swimming pool in New Zealand, originally filling with seawater from the Waitematā Harbour. In the 1950s, the pool complex was redeveloped into the Lido style popular in the United Kingdom, by Hungarian architect Tibor Donner.

== History ==
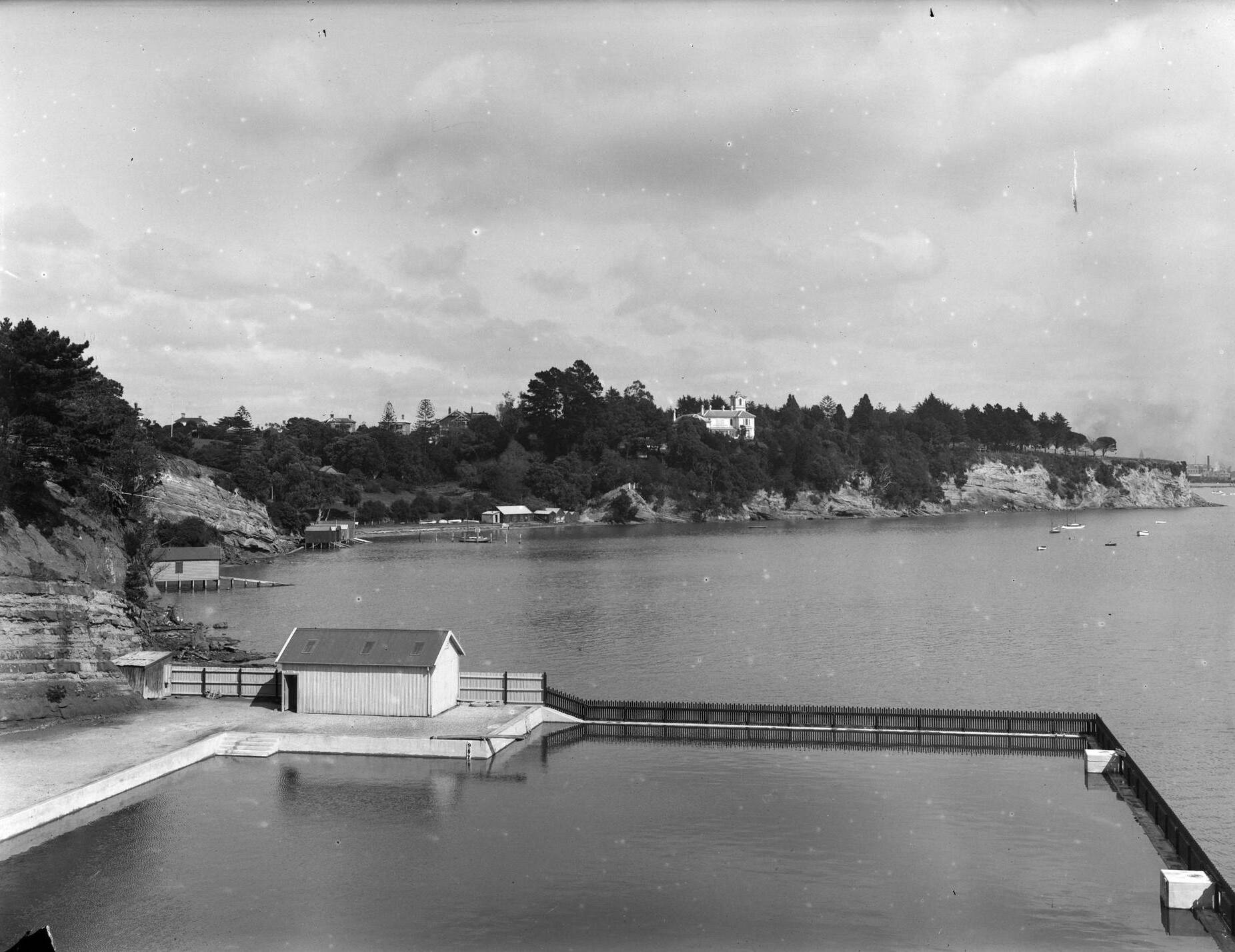
The Parnell Baths and Judges Bay in 1915

After major reclamation works along the Auckland waterfront, many of the beaches residents had traditionally used for bathing in the 19th century were no longer accessible.

In 1912, a decision was made to create a saltwater pool complex at Parnell. Construction on the baths began in 1913, and the pools were officially opened on 7 March 1914. The opening was attended by members of the Auckland Council, local government members and the Auckland Harbour Board. Students from St Stephen's, a local Māori boys boarding school performed a haka and Auckland Mayor James Parr spoke.

The pools were originally only accessible by a narrow stairway down the cliff face from Point Resolution. The Parnell Baths were originally seawater, being filled when Judges Bay was at high tide.

Due to attitudes during the early 20th century, when Parnell Baths first opened men and women were segregated. Complaints were made to the Council about women being denied access on Saturdays, making it difficult for women in the workforce to find time to use the pools. Women were allotted Wednesday afternoons, then in April 1914, after more lobbying, the Parnell Baths finally introduced mixed bathing.

"The water is clean and clear, the surroundings are picturesque, the situation ensures for the bath a minimum of cold winds and a maximum of sunshine, and "mixed bathing," within limits, is permitted. There is no doubt that the latter innovation has proved decidedly popular. The city authorities saw no reason why, when mixed bathing was general on the beaches, the old, early-Victorian rules should apply in so large a bath as that at Parnell. So, while a section of the bath is still reserved for ladies. The ladies may join the gentlemen in the gentlemen's section of the bath. The result has been practically mixed bathing, showing the absurdity of the old rule; and there has been no lack of modesty. The most irreconcilable opponent of mixed bathing might spend a week at Parnell and discover nothing to cavil at." - New Zealand Herald, Volume LII, Issue 16095, 8 December 1915, Page 4.

In 1923, a 1.5 metre springboard was added to the pools. In 1926, a children's pool was added to the complex, and in the following year, the bottom of the pool was concreted.

Between 1926 and 1932, Tamaki Drive was constructed through Hobson Bay, closing off the baths from the sea. During this period, pipes were installed to better fill the baths with seawater, however the sanitation plant at Ōkahu Bay caused the water quality to worsen. This improved in 1939, when water purification plants were installed. From 1944, the Auckland Council began a land reclamation project on Point Resolution, in order to construct an access road to the baths.

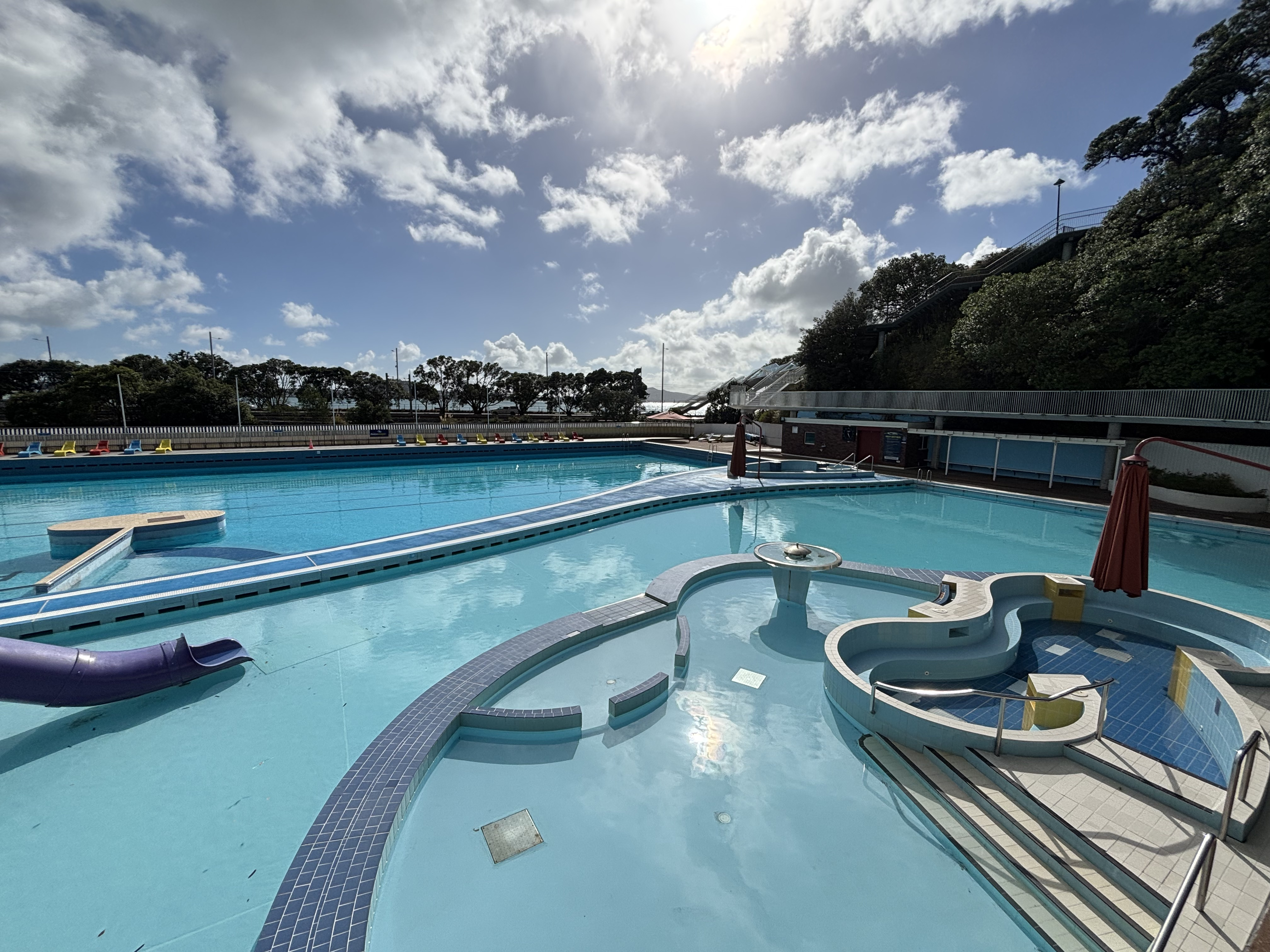
Parnell Baths 2025

In 1954, the pools were renovated in a Lido style by Hungarian architect Tibor Donner, featuring a two-storey building to replace the changing sheds, and a mosaic by New Zealand artist James Turkington. Likely drawing inspiration from Henri Matisse's 'The Swimming Pool,' the mosaic consisted of two murals integrated onto the men's and women's changing rooms, depicting abstracted swimming figures of their respective genders.

Between 2002 and 2003, the pools were upgraded after falling attendance in the 1990s, becoming a modern-style fitness centre. The 2002/3 upgrade of the building was led by Jane Matthews of Matthews and Matthews Architects, restoring the 1950s details and finishes, as well as integrating a redesigned ground floor cafe. The Matthews and Matthews upgrades won two awards in the 2003 Resene Colour Awards - the Commercial Exterior Award and the overall Grand Prix Award.

For the facility's centenary in 2014, the book Parnell Baths: a Jewel in Auckland's Crown was commissioned by Parnell Heritage and the Waitematā Local Board, detailing the site's social history.

After the effects of the 2023 Auckland Anniversary Weekend floods, the pools were closed due to cliff instability.
