= Mechanics Bay =

Coordinates: 36.847631°S 174.785149°E

- Suburb
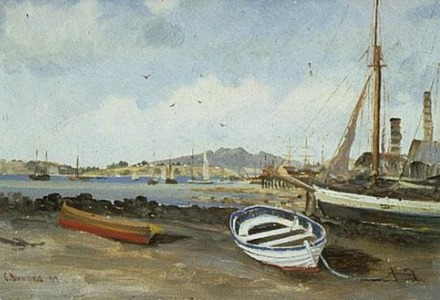
- Painting of Mechanics Bay in 1899, by Charles Blomfield.
- Interactive map of Mechanics Bay
- Country: New Zealand
- City: Auckland Council

	Bayswater	Devonport
Auckland city centre	Mechanics Bay
Newmarket	Parnell	Ōrākei

Mechanics Bay (Māori: Te Tōangaroa) is a reclaimed bay on the Waitematā Harbour in Auckland, New Zealand. It is also the name of the area of the former bay that is now mainly occupied by commercial and port facilities. Sometimes the bay formed between Tāmaki Drive and the western reclamation edge of Fergusson Container Terminal is also referred to as Mechanics Bay.

== History ==
The bay was called Te Tōangaroa by Tāmaki Māori, referring to the need to drag waka a long distance during low tide in the bay. During the early colonial era of Auckland, Mechanics Bay was the main trading port on the Waitematā Harbour for Māori, in a separate location from the main Auckland waterfront.

=== European settlement ===
Along the harbour shore between Point Britomart and St Stephen's Point in Parnell were four bays: Official Bay, Mechanics Bay, St Georges Bay and Judges Bay. Some have now disappeared due to land reclamation and the quarrying of the bordering headlands. Closest to Point Britomart was Official Bay, so called because many government officials lived there during the 1840s.

Almost contiguous with Official Bay was Mechanics Bay. It took its name from its use in housing the labour force the government had brought to construct the new capital. Mechanics Bay contained the mouth of the stream issuing from the springs in the Auckland Domain to the south. The Bay had a broad, flat beach where Māori had long been in the habit of beaching their waka (canoes).

Next to Mechanics Bay was St George's Bay and then Judges Bay, so named because three of the magistrates of the early colony built their houses there. Next to Judges Bay is St Stephen's point, where a small chapel was built.

As early as the 1860s this shore front began to be modified by the European settlers. In particular it was in order to get the railway tracks around to the bottom of Queen Street that Point Britomart was quarried away and Official Bay and Mechanics Bay filled in. Initially the railway tracks came through the gully that lay between the Auckland Domain and the suburb of Parnell, but later when a second route was formed further to the east through Meadowbank the shoreline between Mechanics Bay and Hobson Bay was also modified. St Georges Bay ceased to exist and became the shunting yard for the railway station, and Judges Bay was separated from the harbour by a railway embankment.

The major thoroughfare of Mechanics Bay is Beach Road, which once ran around the beach front of the now reclaimed Mechanics Bay. The former Auckland Railway Station is located here, an impressive brick 1930s structure designed by Gummer and Ford. Formerly located at the bottom of Queen Street, the station was moved to Beach Road to be the centrepiece for the new downtown business area of Auckland. The plan was not a success. The station was decommissioned and the railway terminal returned to its original location, now named the Britomart Transport Centre.

=== Aviation ===
New Zealand's first international airport was in Mechanics Bay. The first aircraft connecting New Zealand with the rest of the world in the 1930s were flying boats. International flights from Britain by Imperial Airways via India, Singapore and Australia connected with TEAL for the Sydney to Auckland leg. Flights by Pan American from America via Hawaii also landed at Auckland. The Short Solent or Boeing 314 flying boats landed in Mechanics Bay, which was the centre of international aviation for New Zealand until the 1950s. Even after the construction of Auckland International Airport at Māngere in the 1960s, Mechanics Bay was still used by flying boats to the Pacific Islands, e.g. for the Coral Route to Fiji.

From 1962 to 1989, Mechanics Bay was home to first Tourist Air Travel, then Mount Cook Airline then Sea Bee Air operating a fleet of Grumman Goose, Grumman Widgeon and Grumman Turbo Goose amphibian aircraft for regular scheduled passenger and freight services to the islands of the Hauraki Gulf (particularly Great Barrier and Waiheke Islands) and operated charter flights to other areas such as the Bay of Islands, Manukau & Kaipara Harbours and elsewhere around the country and to Pacific islands. Operating from what is now the Marine Rescue Centre, they were located near Compass Dolphin (since destroyed in a fierce storm in the early 1990s).

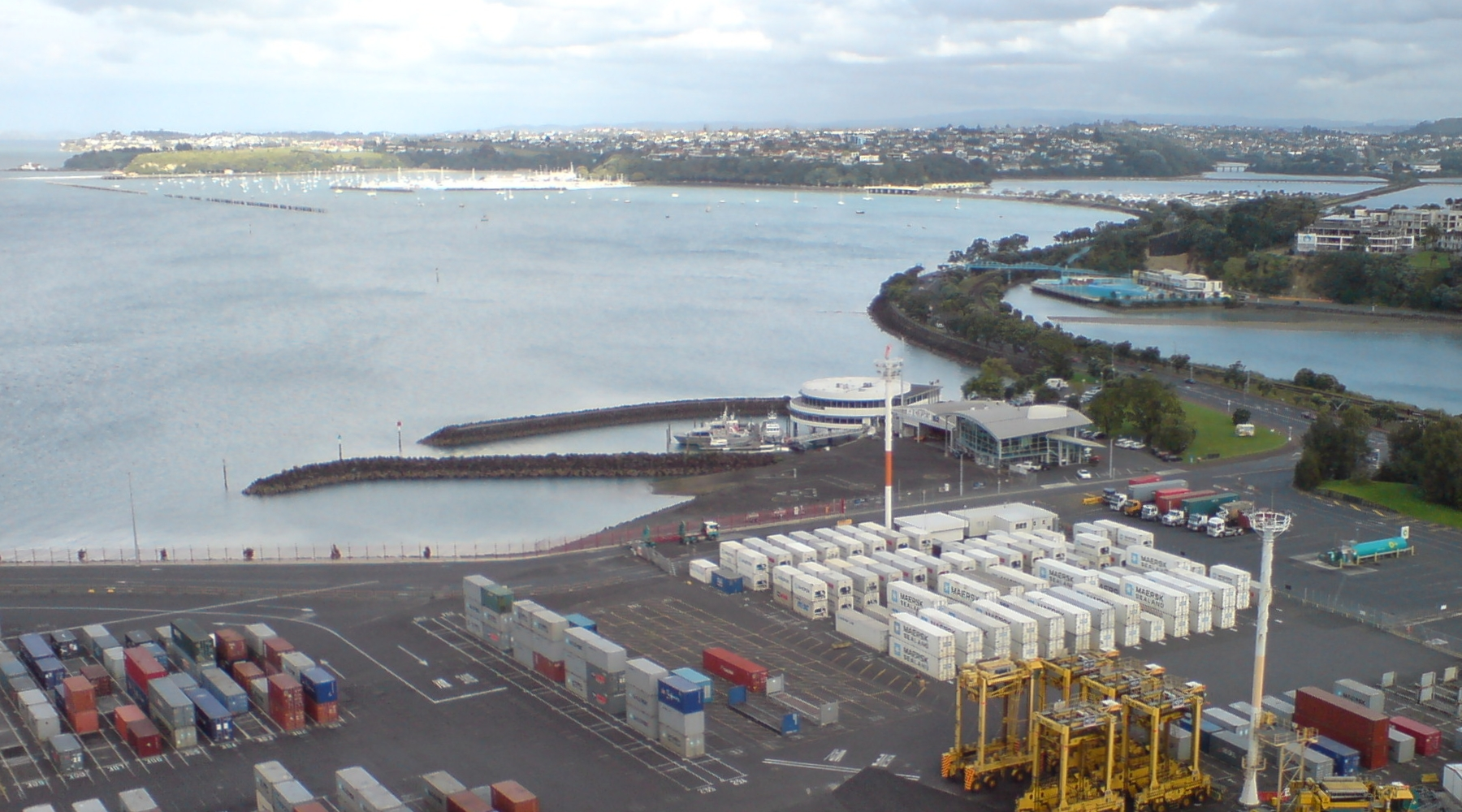
The Mechanics Bay area is now filled in by the container terminal of Ports of Auckland.

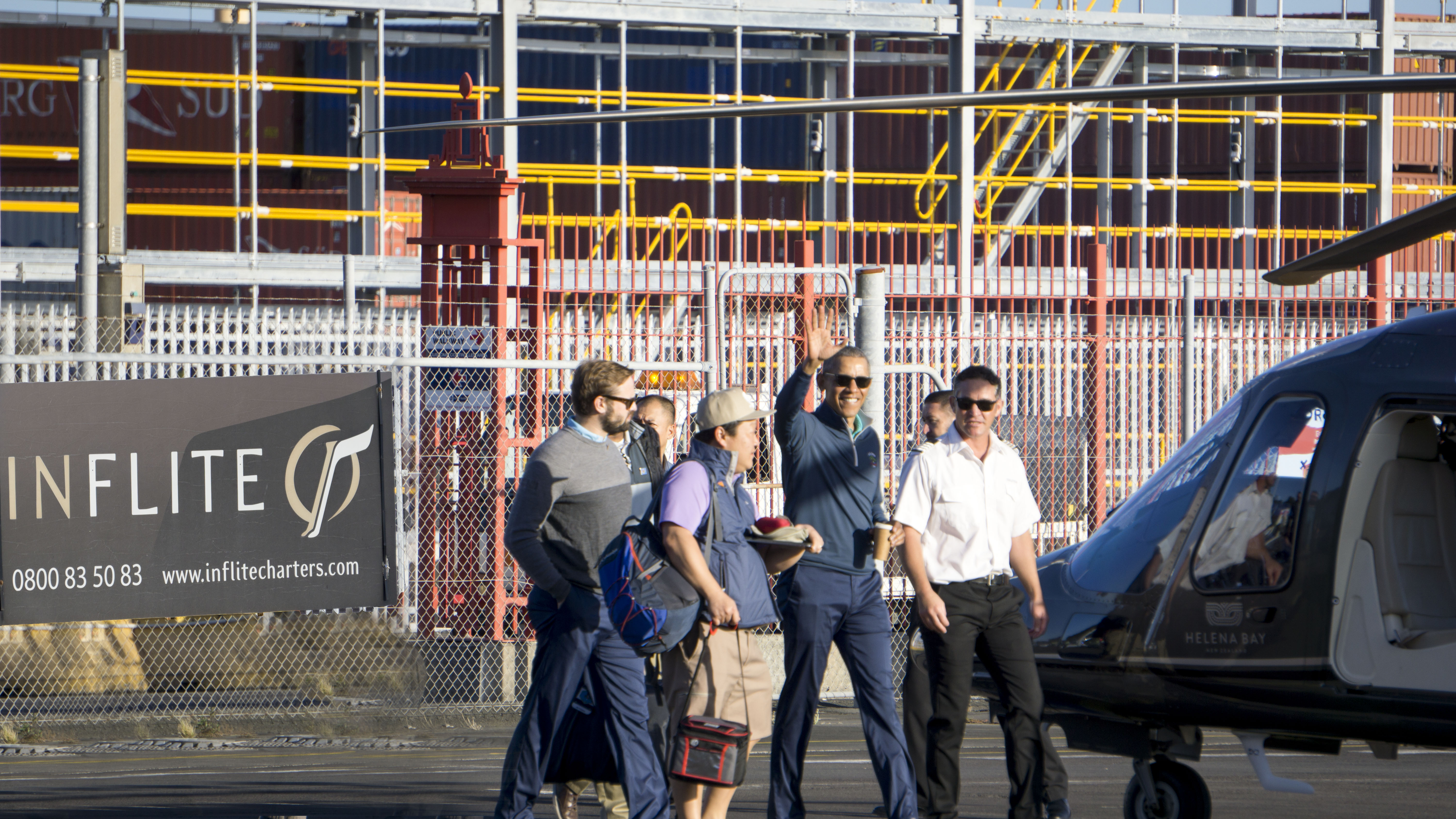
Barack Obama waving to INFLITE & Westpac Rescue staff at Mechanics Bay before boarding his helicopter.

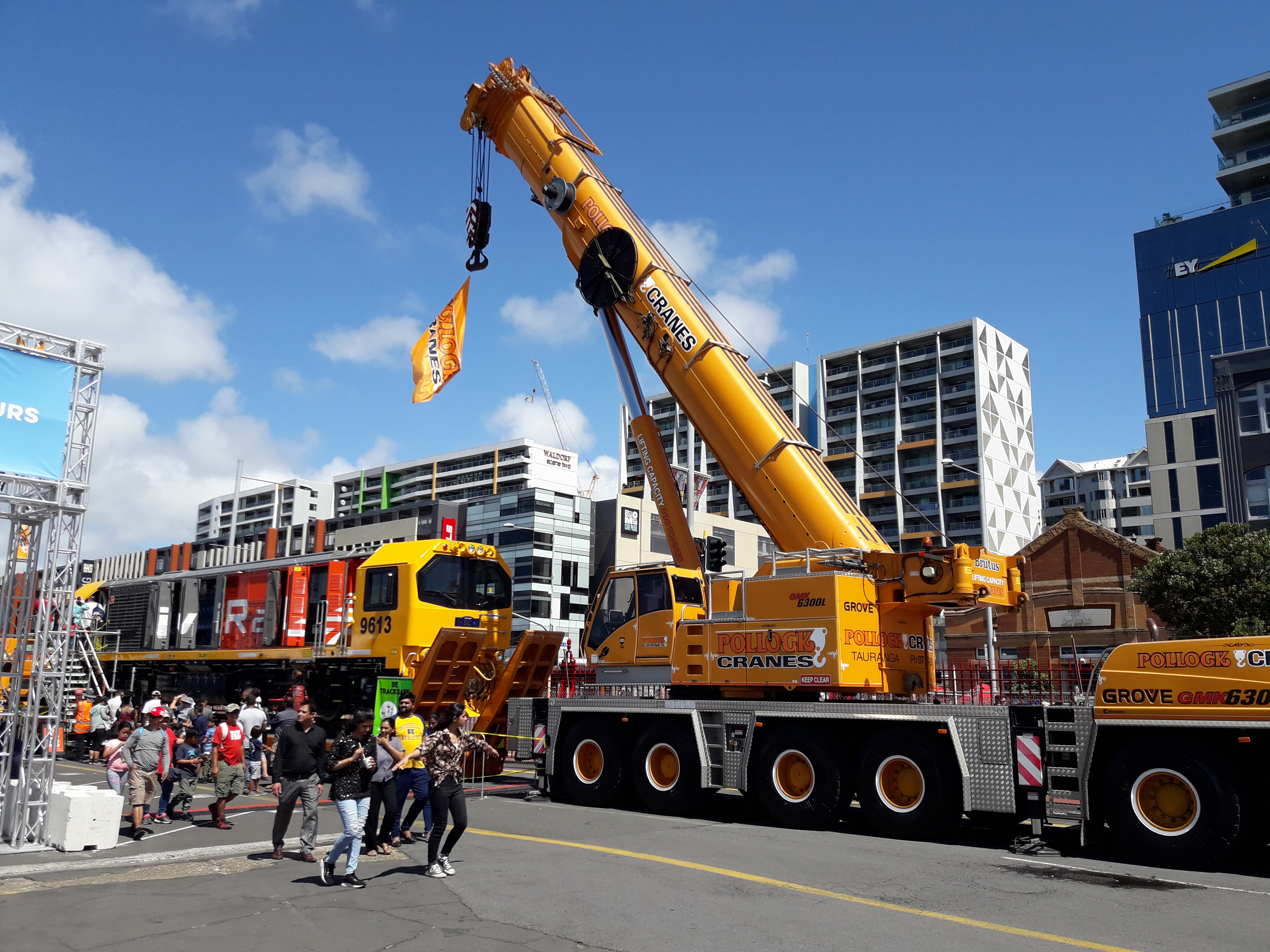
Mechanics Bay as seen from the Ports of Auckland SeePort Open Weekend on Auckland Anniversary Weekend in 2019

Mechanics Bay also has a heliport, which has been the base for a number of sightseeing and commercial flight companies, as well as the Westpac Rescue Helicopter and NZ Police Air Support Unit known as the Eagle Helicopter. It is located next to the Auckland Marine Rescue Centre at the eastern end of the Ports of Auckland container terminal. In May 2013 a helicopter crashed in the water off Mechanics Bay, both the pilot and passenger were quickly rescued from the water unharmed by a nearby navy boat.

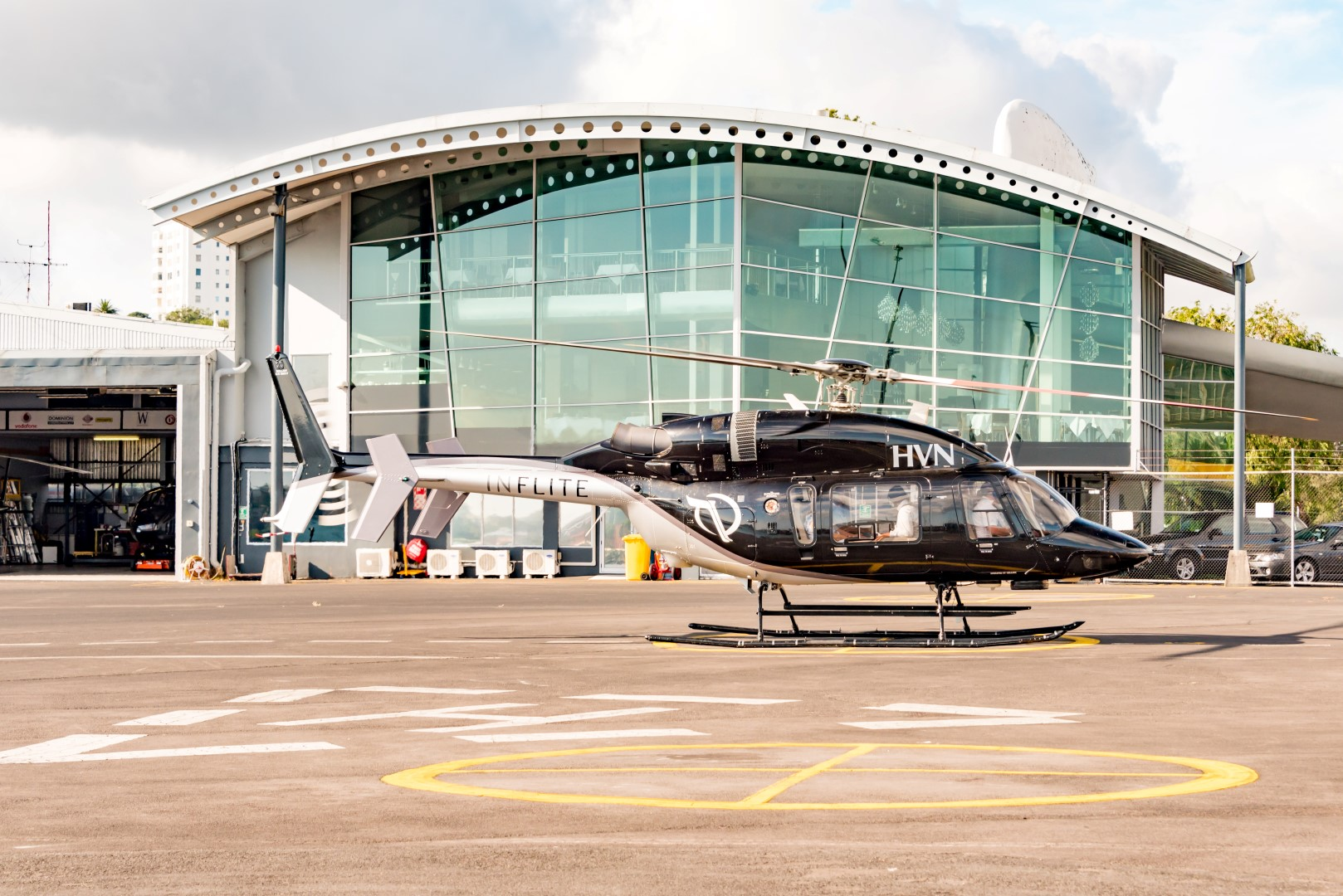
ZK-HVN at Mechanics Bay, about to depart for Waiheke Island

Eagleflight Aviation have occupied and operated Mechanics Bay Heliport since mid-2018. A fleet of Airbus/Eurocopter H130 helicopters are operated by luxury charter company Helicopter Me.

== Surrounding area ==
At its eastern end where Beach Road turns into Parnell Rise is a major intersection, over which the railway is carried on a metal viaduct. The road to the north is The Strand which follows the shore line of the reclaimed St Georges Bay. The road to the south is Stanley Street, which turns into Grafton Road as it ascends the hill towards the hospital and Auckland Domain. Stanley Street is named for Mrs Stanley, who lived in the area during the 1850s and ran a well known and apparently well regarded girls school.

On the corner of Stanley Street and Parnell Rise is the Strand Hotel. This building is almost overpowered by the busy intersection and by the railway viaduct passing close to it. When the Strand Hotel was built in the 1840s as the Swan Hotel it stood directly on the quayside as a waterfront pub. Just opposite it on the other corner of Stanley Street stood the Native Hostel.

Long before the Europeans arrived, Māori had beached their wakas on the broad flat beach just here and right from the founding of Auckland in 1840 into the late 20th century this portion of land was reserved for their use. The 19th century hostel buildings only disappeared in the 1970s, when they were replaced by a depot for the New Zealand Post Office.

== Climate ==
Climate data for Mechanics Bay (1951–1980)
Month	Jan	Feb	Mar	Apr	May	Jun	Jul	Aug	Sep	Oct	Nov	Dec	Year
Mean daily maximum °C (°F)	24.0 (75.2)	24.2 (75.6)	23.1 (73.6)	20.7 (69.3)	17.9 (64.2)	15.8 (60.4)	14.9 (58.8)	15.4 (59.7)	16.9 (62.4)	18.7 (65.7)	20.6 (69.1)	22.4 (72.3)	19.6 (67.2)
Daily mean °C (°F)	20.3 (68.5)	20.7 (69.3)	19.6 (67.3)	17.2 (63.0)	14.5 (58.1)	12.4 (54.3)	11.3 (52.3)	12.0 (53.6)	13.3 (55.9)	15.1 (59.2)	16.9 (62.4)	18.7 (65.7)	16.0 (60.8)
Mean daily minimum °C (°F)	16.5 (61.7)	17.1 (62.8)	16.0 (60.8)	13.6 (56.5)	11.0 (51.8)	8.9 (48.0)	7.7 (45.9)	8.6 (47.5)	9.7 (49.5)	11.5 (52.7)	13.1 (55.6)	15.0 (59.0)	12.4 (54.3)
Average rainfall mm (inches)	65 (2.6)	94 (3.7)	89 (3.5)	113 (4.4)	119 (4.7)	133 (5.2)	138 (5.4)	136 (5.4)	99 (3.9)	98 (3.9)	89 (3.5)	85 (3.3)	1,258 (49.5)
Mean monthly sunshine hours	235	198	194	165	137	122	134	151	157	190	203	228	2,114
Source: NIWA
