= Parnell Rose Gardens =

Park in Parnell, Auckland, New Zealand

Coordinates: 36.850718°S 174.786338°E

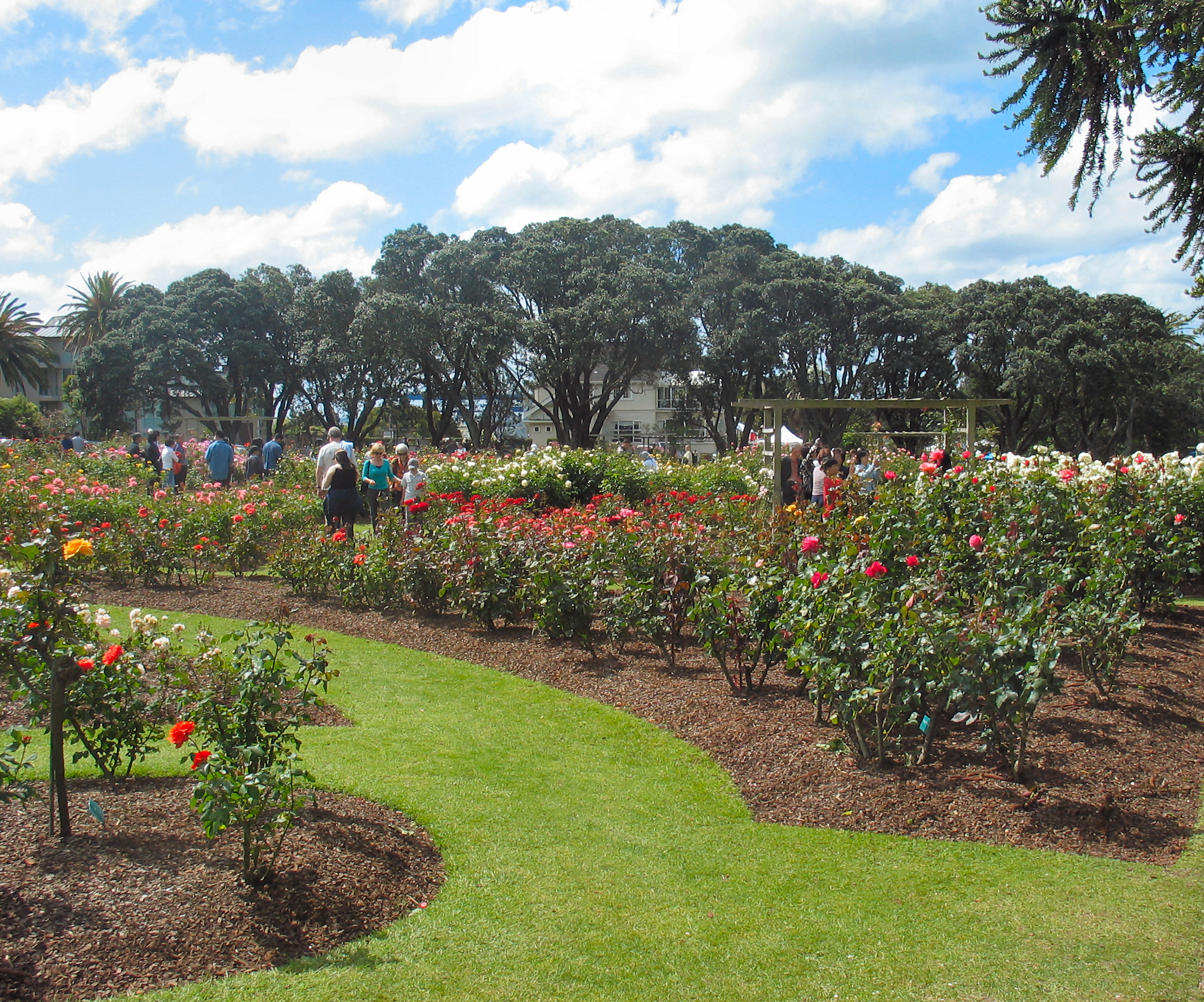
Parnell Rose Garden during the 2006 Rose Festival.

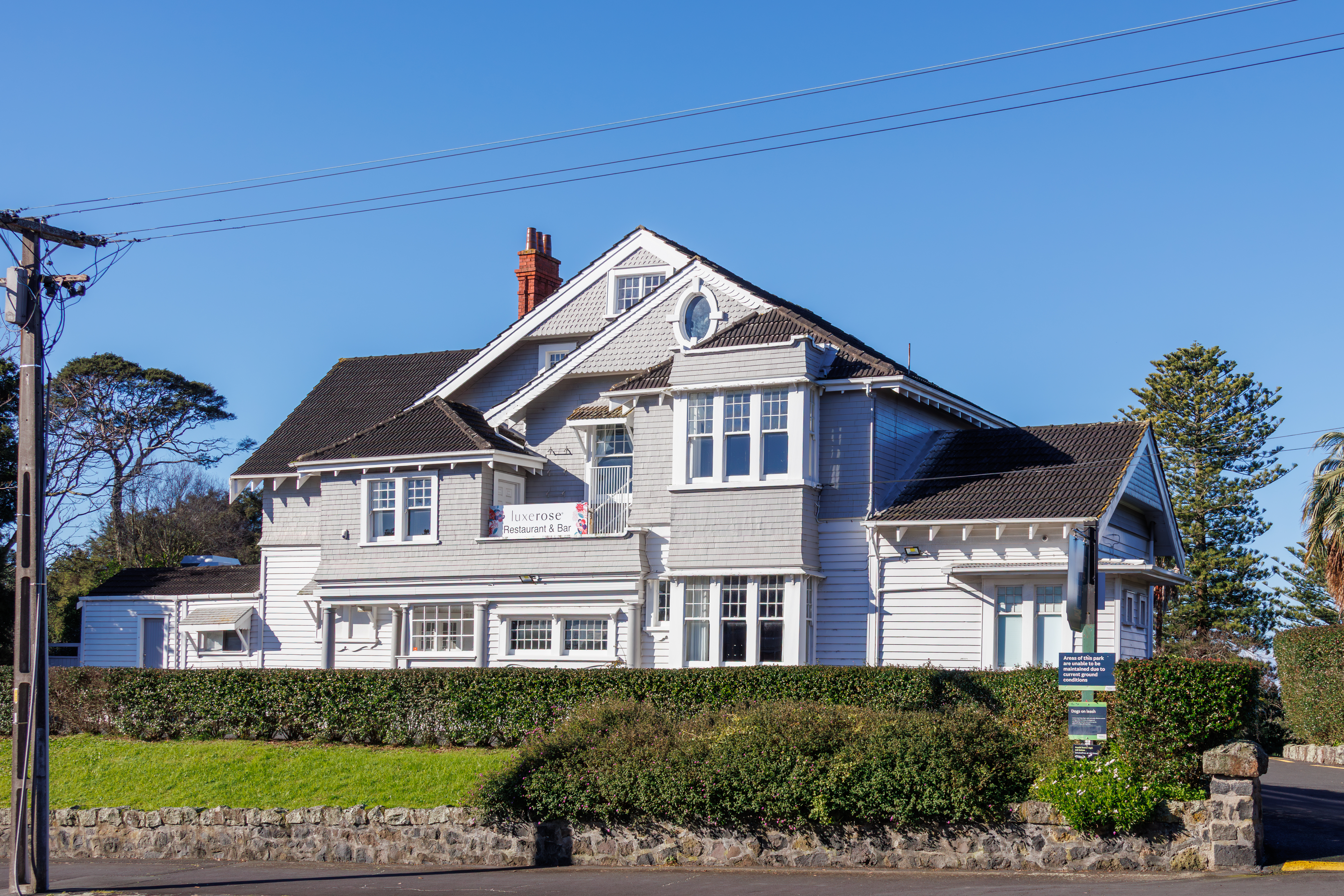
The Kohanga building.

Dove-Myer Robinson Park, more commonly known as the Parnell Rose Garden, is a park in Parnell, Auckland, New Zealand. The park is named after Dove-Myer Robinson, the longest-serving mayor of Auckland, who served for 18 years. There are over 5,000 roses in the garden. Some of the plants in the garden have been bred by internationally celebrated rose breeders.

The 'white garden' is a popular venue for weddings. As of 2010, the park was home to the oldest mānuka and the largest pōhutukawa tree in Auckland. Parnell Festival of Roses, takes place each November, with stalls and entertainment during the day.

== History ==
The area was once known as Taurarua. It was included in the land made available by Ngati Whatua for the establishment of Auckland city in September 1840 .

In around 1905, what is now the Luxerose cafe, was built for Emily Gillies, the widow of Robert Gillies, as a timber and shingle, Arts and Crafts style house, named "Kohanga". It is likely to have been designed by Charles Le Neve Arnold, the architect of Auckland Grammar School.

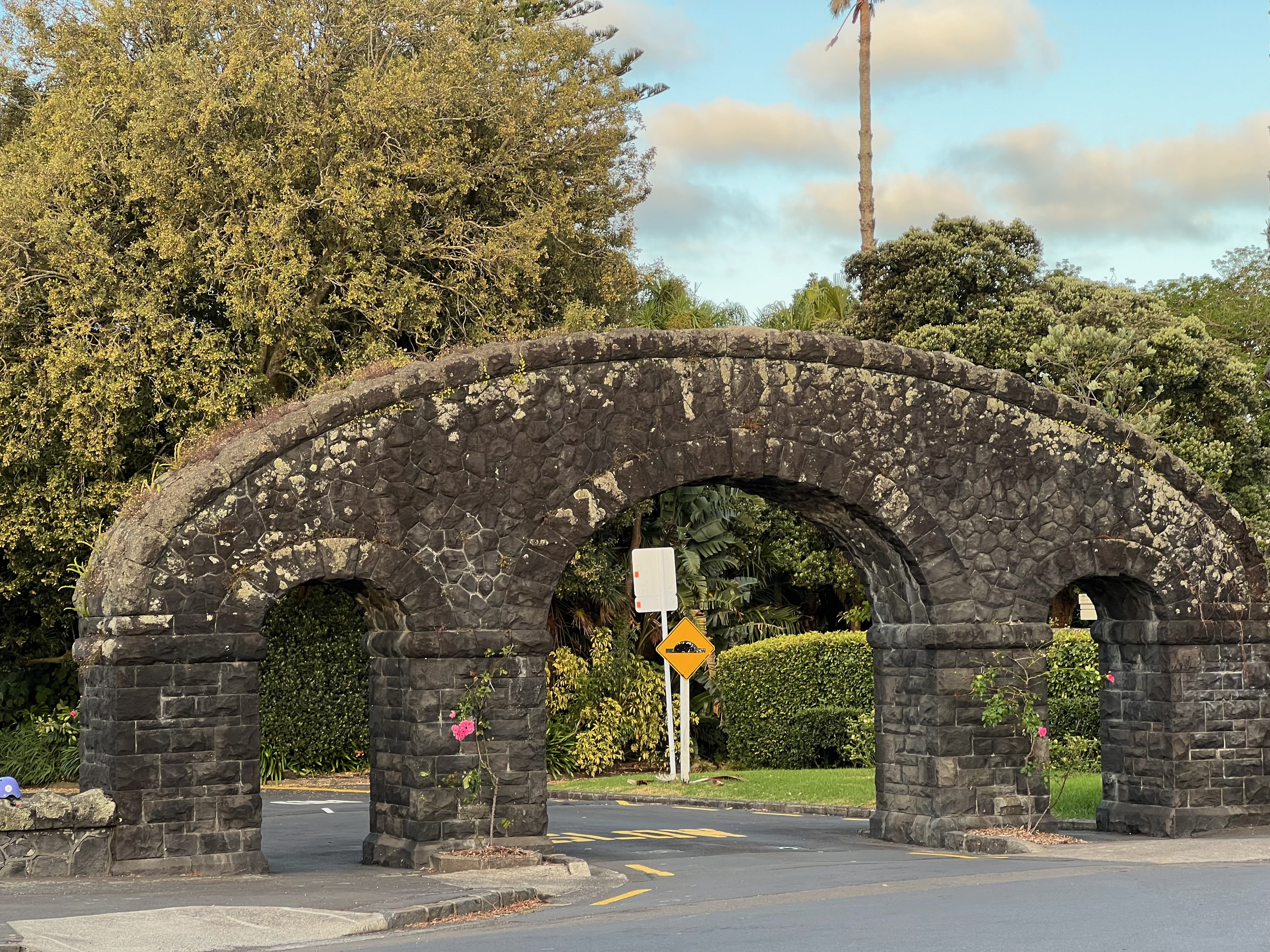
The controversial 1925 stone entrance

In 1914 ratepayers voted by 815:575 for a £15,000 loan to buy 3.8 hectares (9 1/2 acres) for a park. In 1915 a court settled the price at £16,125. The Gillies residence was converted to a tea house in 1925. Also in 1925, a controversial stone entrance was built.

Other additions include; The Netherlands War Memorial (1963), the Signals sculpture (1971), the Dove-Myer Robinson Lookout Shelter (1981) and the Nancy Steen Garden (1984). The gardens were renamed after the former mayor in 1981.

== The Nancy Steen Garden ==
Her Excellency Lady Beattie opened the Nancy Steen Garden, a joint project by Heritage Roses New Zealand Inc. and Auckland Council, on 13 November 1984.

The Nancy Steen Garden displays heritage roses to honour rosarian and artist Nancy Steen (1898 - 1986), who was born Agnes Acheson in Otautau on 22 September 1898.

Nancy's family left Otautau in 1906. She attended Columba College in 1915 and 1916, and the Nancy Steen Memorial Garden was opened next to the Bishopscourt Boarding House in 2012.

Nancy married David Harvey Steen at St. Luke's Church, Remuera, on 12 July 1927. Her daughters were born in 1930 and 1934. She grew roses at the family's home at 30 Upland Road, from 1944.

Her book 'The Charm of Old Roses' was first published in 1966.

The Floribunda blush pink 'Nancy Steen' rose was developed by George C. Sherwood in 1976.

The fortieth anniversary of the Nancy Steen Garden was celebrated on 9 November 2024.
