= Ewelme Cottage =

Historic cottage in New Zealand

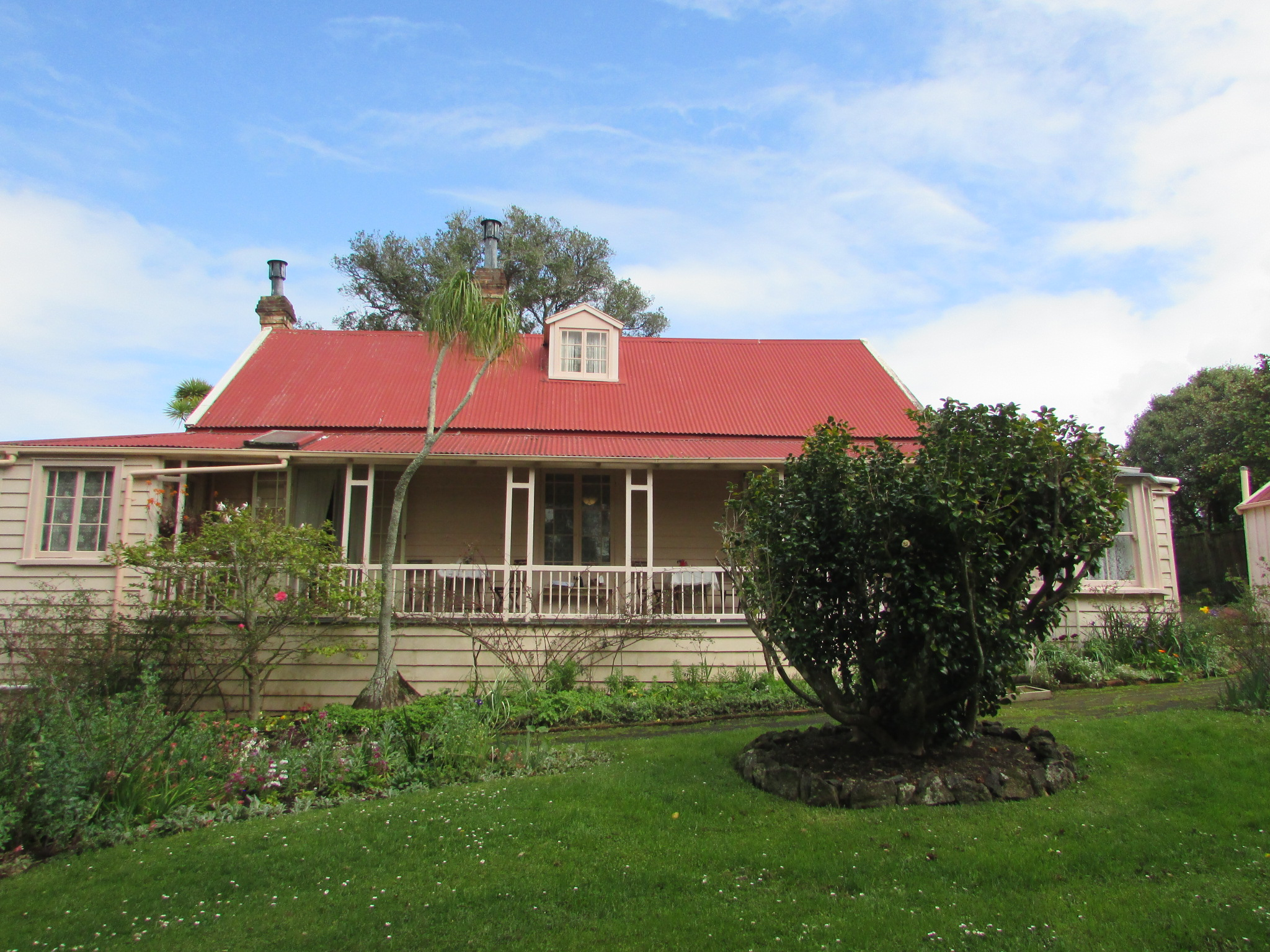
- Front of Ewelme Cottage in 2024
- Etymology: Ewelme Church

General information
- Architectural style: Georgian
- Location: Parnell, 14 Ayr Street, Parnell, Auckland
- Coordinates: 36.862825°S 174.783653°E
- Year built: 1863–1864

Website
- https://visitheritage.co.nz/visit/auckland/ewelme-cottage/

Heritage New Zealand – Category 1
- Designated: 11 November 1983
- Reference no.: 15

Ewelme Cottage is a historic cottage in Parnell, Auckland, New Zealand that is listed as a Category I building by Heritage New Zealand.

Ewelme Cottage was built for Vicesimus Lush to serve as a home for his sons so they could attend an Anglican school whilst he was away on religious duties. It was purchased about a century later by the Auckland City Council and is now managed by Heritage New Zealand.

== Description ==
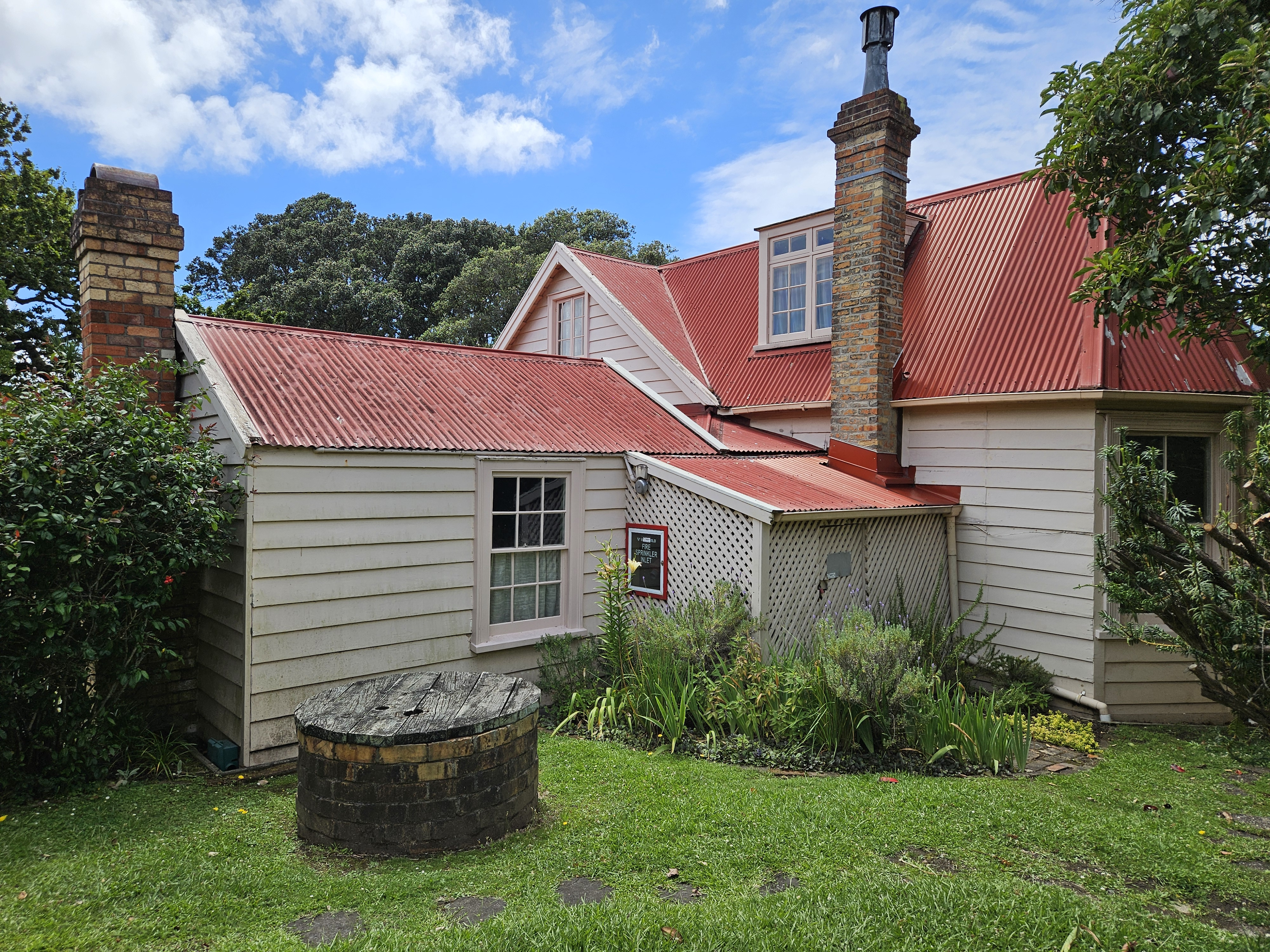
Rear of Ewelme Cottage. The building below the tallest chimney was used to store butter and other goods that required cooler temperatures, the building to the left is the kitchen

Ewelme Cottage is a one and a half storey Georgian cottage. The groundplan may have been planned by Lush with an architect in England in 1850. Lush may have been influenced by an idea prevalent in ecclesiology at the time which advocated for mediaeval architectural influence in contemporary buildings. The original building was Georgian in its external design but differed in the room layout compared to traditional front and backs of Georgian buildings. The cottage originally contained five rooms with two connected lean-tos. The lean-tos likely held a scullery and woodshed. The interior and furnishings are well preserved from the 19th century, with original furniture and 2,000 books. The property has a 19th-century garden.

Ewelme Cottage is named after the Ewelme Church in England.

== History ==
Ewelme Cottage in 1867

The construction of Ewelme Cottage was commissioned by the vicar of Howick, Vicesimus Lush. Parnell was the seat of the Anglican Bishop of New Zealand and the cottage enabled Lush's sons to attend the Church of England grammar school in Parnell whilst he attended to religious duties elsewhere. Ewelme Cottage was built between 1863 and 1864. Lush's family lived in the cottage until 1871 where they followed him to his new position as the vicar of Thames.

The building would see modifications in 1865, with the verandah enclosed to enlarge the house; an extension c.1871, to add a rear kitchen and attic; and extensive alterations in 1882–1883. Following this however the building has remained largely the same with some minor modifications made in 1970–1971 to conserve the building.

The Lush family would continue to own the property for over a century. In 1969 they sold the property to the Auckland City Council and is currently managed by Heritage New Zealand.

== Hillside ==
Lush built a property in 1883 on the neighbouring lot which he named Hillside.

== Legacy ==
According to Heritage New Zealand the building is 'held in high public esteem'. An article in the New Zealand Herald called it the 'possibly most important of Auckland's Historic Places Trust properties'.

Rumours around ghosts inhabiting the property exist.

Ewelme Cottage was used in the filming of The Piano.
