= Tibor Donner =

Architect in New Zealand (1907–1993)

- Born: Tibor Karoly Donner; 19 September 1907; Szabadka (Subotica), Austria-Hungary (now part of Serbia)
- Died: 11 March 1993 (aged 85); Auckland, New Zealand
- Occupation: Architect

Tibor Karoly Donner (19 September 1907 – 11 March 1993) was an Austro–Hungarian born New Zealand architect, who was the chief architect for the Auckland City Council from 1947 to 1967.

== Personal life ==
Donner was born in Szabadka, Austria-Hungary (now known as Subotica and part of Serbia), on 19 September 1907. He was the second child of Ladislaus Cornel Donner, an engineer, and Maria Donner née Kovats de Dalnok. He and his brother Cornel were brought up in the Lutheran faith of their father, and his sister Klara in the mother's Roman Catholic faith.

The family immigrated to New Zealand in 1927 aboard the SS Rimutaka. Donner studied architecture at Auckland University College and from 1935 until 1937 worked privately in the profession. In 1938 he joined the Public Works Department. He remained with the department until 1947 when he established the architectural office at the Auckland City Council. He was the council's chief architect until his retirement in 1967.

Donner married Margaret Bennett in 1934. The couple had one child, a daughter also called Margaret. Tibor Donner died at Auckland on 11 March 1993, survived by his wife and his daughter. His work left an enduring legacy to the people of Auckland.

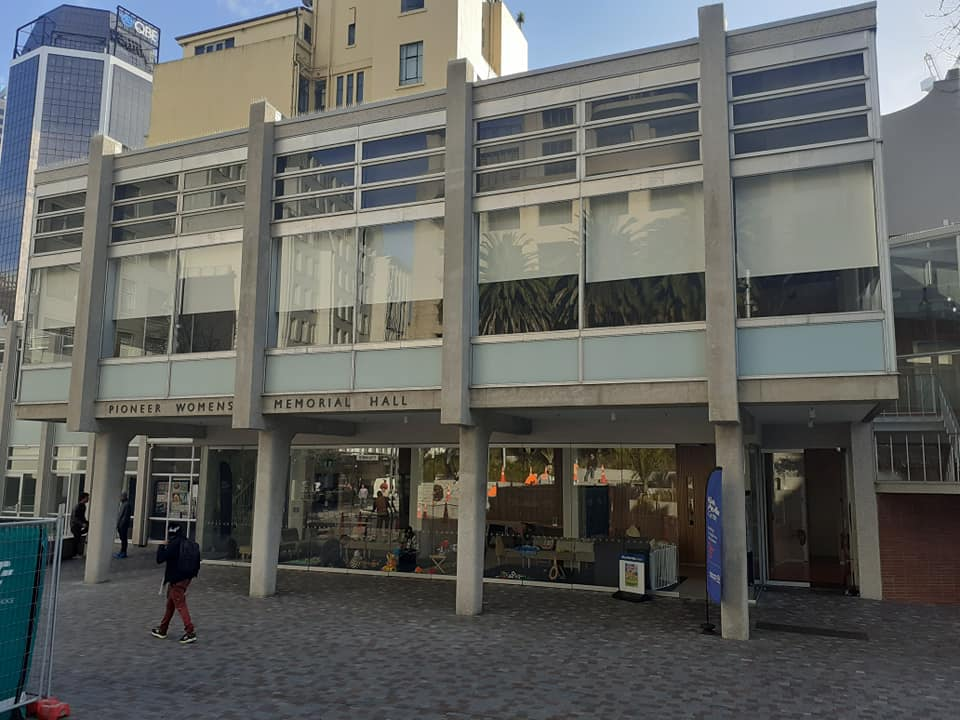
Ellen Melville Centre, formerly Pioneer Women’s & Ellen Melville Memorial Hall, Freyberg Square, Auckland

== Design ==
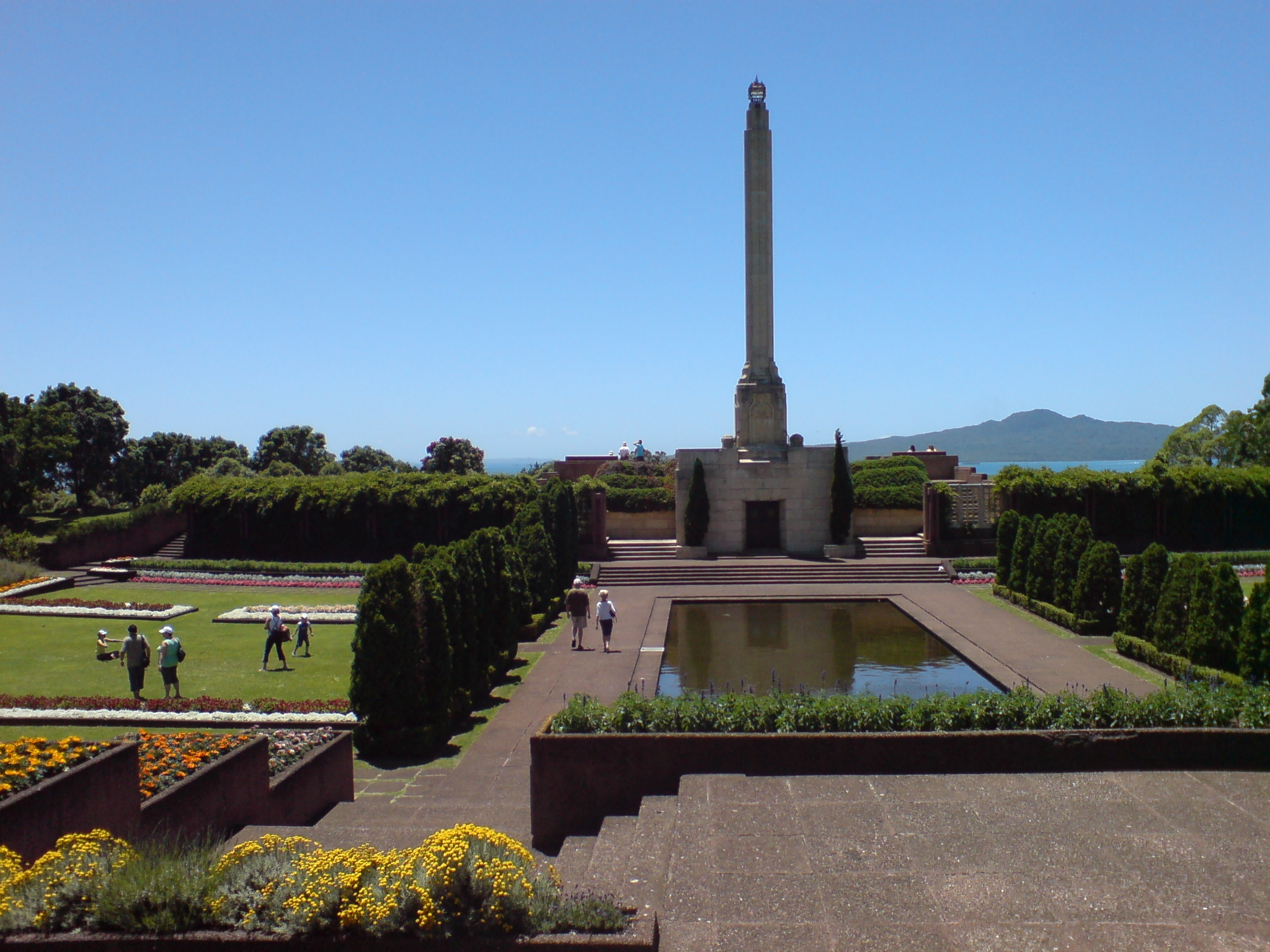
The Michael Joseph Savage Memorial at Bastion Point

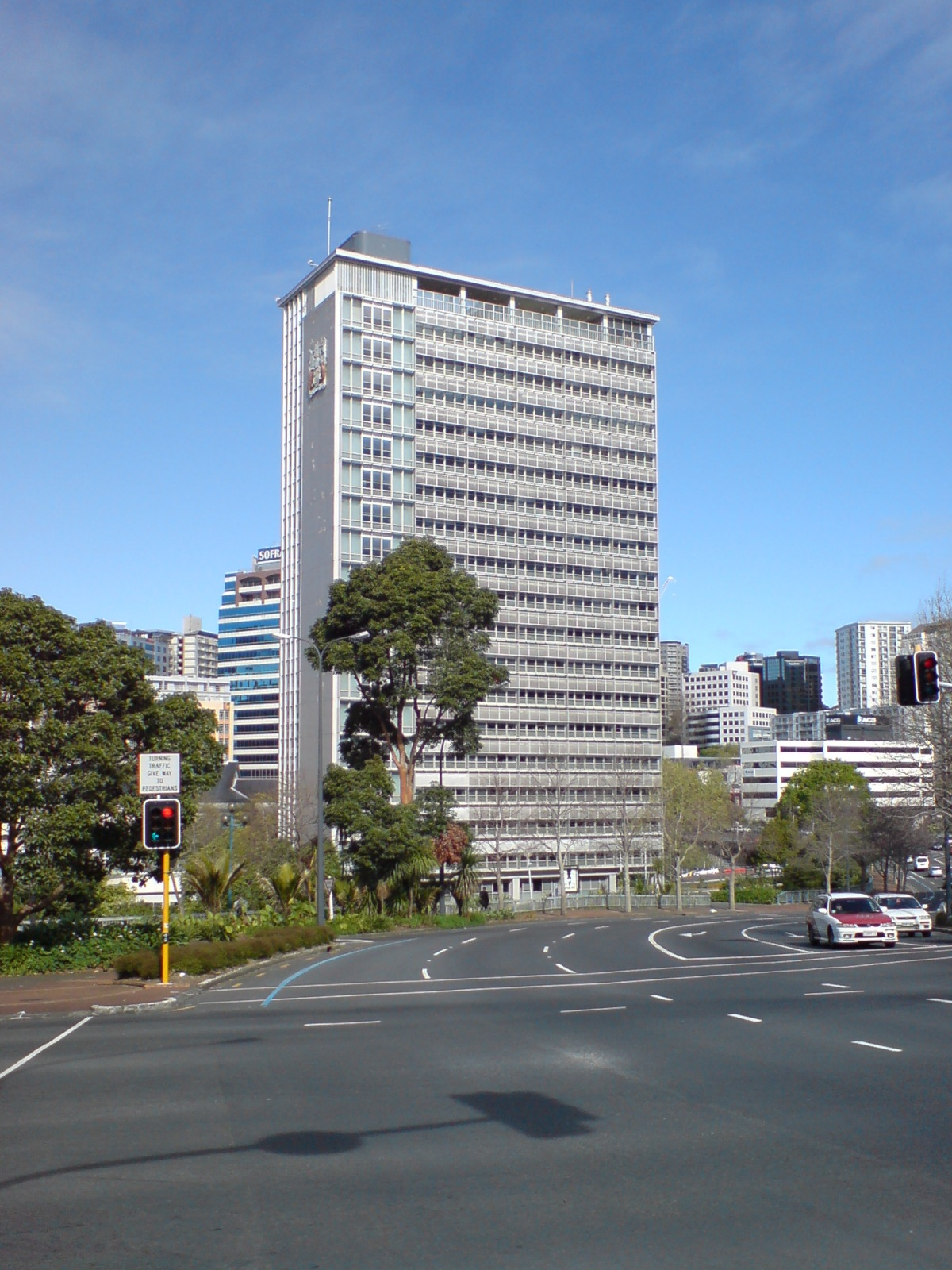
The Auckland City Council Administration Building

Donner's designs incorporated styles from North and South America which were often reflective of high modernism. Although they were influenced by international architectural trends, their usage of local materials also gave them a distinctly New Zealand flavour. Notable structures by Donner include Auckland's Savage Memorial (1941), Avondale Military Hospital – later converted into the high school (1943), Khyber pump station (1947), Parnell Baths (1951–54) and the Auckland City Council's Administration Buildings (1954–60). They reflect the confidence of Auckland during its rapid expansion in the postwar era.

Donner's stylistic influences are particularly evident in the Auckland City Council Administration Building. The building draws significantly from the design principles espoused by Le Corbusier. Donner had visited New York City in 1956 to study Lever House and was aware of emerging contemporary styles (such as those of Ludwig Mies van der Rohe) but chose to reject them. It is significant that Donner had turned away from the more minimal contemporary style of building and the extensive use of glass, since this style is now very common in Auckland.

== List of works ==
=== Public buildings ===
| Year | Building | Location |
|---|---|---|
| 1937 | Newmarket Post Office | [formerly located at 180 Broadway, Newmarket – demolished in 1999] |
| 1941 | Michael Joseph Savage Memorial | 36.845646°S 174.826103°E |
| 1943 | Avondale Military Hospital (now Avondale College) | 36.8907°S 174.6903°E |
| 1947 | Khyber Pump Station | 36.865759°S 174.761482°E |
| 1951 | Auckland City Council Housing Developments | [various locations in Freemans Bay and Parnell] |
| 1951–54 | Parnell Baths | 36.849247°S 174.791364°E |
| 1953–57 | Vehicle Testing Station | [formerly located at 285 Great North Rd, Grey Lynn – now demolished] |
| 1954–60 | Administration Building (Greys Ave) | 36.852844°S 174.76194°E |
| 1958 | Auckland Centennial Memorial | (Auckland Domain) 36.857638°S 174.774706°E |
| 1959–61 | Pioneer Women’s & Ellen Melville Memorial Hall (now the Ellen Melville Centre) | 36.847657°S 174.766916°E |
| 1960–61 | Pt Erin Baths | 36.839011°S 174.740791°E |
| 1961–64 | Victoria St Parking Building | 36.849038°S 174.766429°E |
| 1966 | Glen Innes Public Library | 36.879261°S 174.8567°E |
| 1970 | Green Bay Kindergarten | 36.930229°S 174.675355°E |

=== Houses ===
Aside from his work for the Auckland City Council and the Public Works Department, Donner also designed several houses in the hills around Titirangi. His former house is located in Kohu Road, but he also designed several others in the surrounding area for his friends.
