= St Stephen's Chapel, Auckland =

Historic church building in Parnell, New Zealand

Coordinates: 36°51′1.28″S 174°47′22.37″E

St Stephen's Chapel
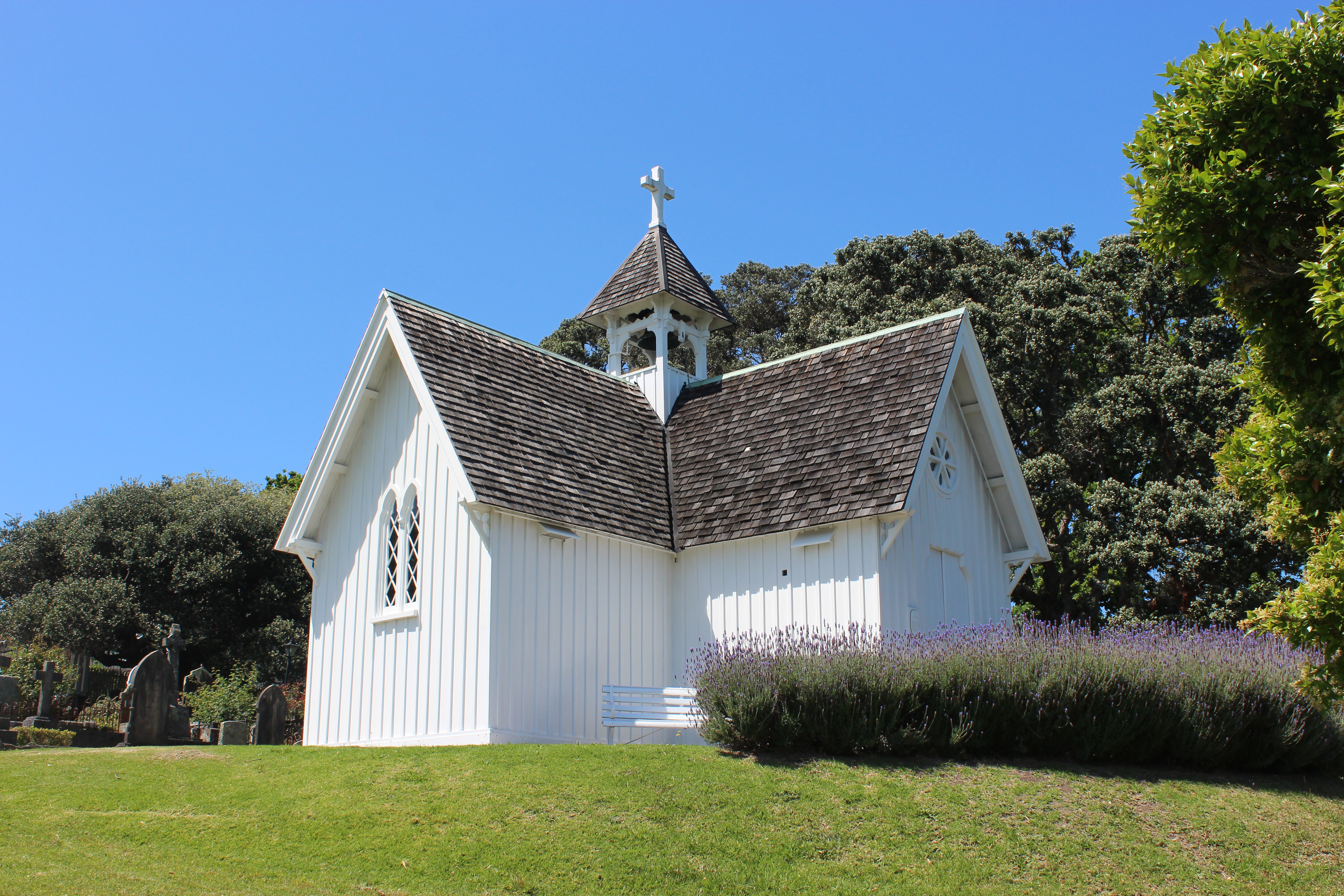
- St Stephen's Chapel in 2018
- Address: 12 Judge Street, Parnell, Auckland
- Denomination: Anglican
- Website: www.holy-trinity.org.nz/ststephenschapel

History
- Status: Chapel and churchyard
- Dedication: Saint Stephen
- Events: 1857 signing of the Constitution of the United Church of England and Ireland in New Zealand

Architecture
- Functional status: Active
- Architect: Frederick Thatcher
- Style: Neo-Gothic
- Completed: 1857

Administration
- Diocese: Auckland
- Parish: Cathedral of the Holy Trinity

Heritage New Zealand – Category 1
- Designated: 1 September 1983
- Reference no.: 22

The St Stephen's Chapel is a historic Neo-Gothic Anglican chapel and associated churchyard located in Judges Bay, Parnell, Auckland, New Zealand, and registered as a category 1 building with Heritage New Zealand.

== Description ==
St Stephen's Chapel is situated on an elevated position above Judge's Bay. The chapel is designed in a Greek cross shape, unlike the Latin cross shape used for most churches. The chapel is made up of five different units each one 10ft by 10 ft (3.0 m). It has high pitched rooves, small lancet windows, and a belfry in the middle.

== History ==
George Augustus Selwyn, the first Bishop of New Zealand moved to Parnell in 1844. At this time the nearest Anglican church was the old St Paul's Church in Emily Place. Selwyn purchased two and a half acres of land situated above Judge's Bay. Selwyn then funded construction of a chapel, which he named St Stephen's Chapel. The chapel was an English Gothic building designed by Sampson Kempthorne and constructed from scoria and rubble. Bishop Selwyn used the chapel until 1847 when a hurricane caused it to collapse on account of the poor quality of construction.

In 1857 Bishop Selwyn commissioned a new chapel. Frederick Thatcher designed it. The chapel is unique in that it was almost certainly built specifically as the place of signing of the constitution of the United Church of England and Ireland in New Zealand on 13 June 1857, and its floor plan is a Greek Cross as a symbol of the establishment of the church, whilst all other churches built for Bishop Selwyn use the traditional Latin cruciform plan.

The chapel fell into disrepair, and was restored in the late 1920s by Archbishop Alfred Averill.

The lych-gate was dedicated by Archbishop Averill on 20 March 1947.

The chapel and its churchyard were registered on 1 September 1983 by the New Zealand Historic Places Trust as a Category I historic place with registration number 22.

== Notable burials ==
- Charles Baker (1803–1875), missionary
- William Cowie (1831–1902), bishop of the Anglican Diocese of Auckland
- Josiah Firth (1826–1897), businessman and politician
- James Kemp (1797–1872), missionary
- William Swainson Attorney General
- Frederick Whitaker (1812–1891), premier of New Zealand (twice)
- Reader Wood (1821–1895), politician and architect
