= Hudson baronets =

Extinct baronetcy in the Baronetage of the United Kingdom

There have been two Hudson Baronetcies, both of which are now extinct. A third, which began with Sir Charles Hudson, 1st Baronet of Wanlip Hall on 21 June 1791, changed name with the second Baronet becoming the Palmer baronets.

== Hudson baronets of Melton Mowbray, Leics (1660) ==
Escutcheon of the Hudson baronets of Melton Mowbray

The Hudson Baronetcy of Melton Mowbray, in the County of Leicester was created on 3 July 1660, in the Baronetage of England, for Henry Hudson. It became extinct on the death of the 7th Baronet in c. 1781

- Sir Henry Hudson, 1st Baronet (c. 1609–1690)
- Sir Edward Hudson, 2nd Baronet (c. 1637–1702)
- Sir Benjamin Hudson, 3rd Baronet (c. 1665–1730)
- Sir Charles Hudson, 4th Baronet (died 1752)
- Sir Skeffington Hudson, 5th Baronet (1683–1760)
- Sir Charles Hudson, 6th Baronet (died 1773)
- Sir Charles Vallavine Hudson, 7th Baronet (1755–c. 1781)

== Hudson baronets of North Hackney, Middlesex (1942) ==
The Hudson Baronetcy of North Hackney, in the County of Middlesex was created on 9 July 1942, in the Baronetage of the United Kingdom, for the Conservative Party politician Austin Hudson. It became extinct on his death in 1956.

- Sir Austin Uvedale Morgan Hudson, 1st Baronet (1897–1956)
