= William Martin (judge) =

The Honourable Sir William Martin
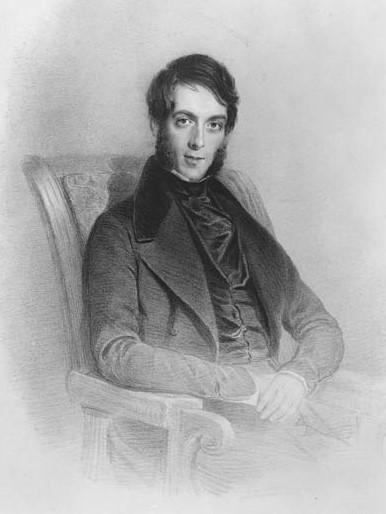

1st Chief Justice of New Zealand
- In office 5 February 1841 – 12 June 1857
- Appointed by: William Hobson
- Preceded by: Office established
- Succeeded by: George Arney

Personal details
- Born: 1807 Birmingham, England
- Died: 18 November 1880 (aged 72–73) Torquay, England
- Spouse: Mary Ann, Lady Martin (née Parker)

Sir William Martin (1807 – 18 November 1880) was the first Chief Justice of New Zealand, from 1841 until he resigned in 1857.

== Biography ==
Originally from the family of the Martins of Long Melford, Suffolk, Martin was born in Birmingham. He was born in 1807 and baptised on 22 May 1807. He was educated at King Edward VI Grammar School, Eton, and St John's College, Cambridge. On 3 April 1841, he married Mary Ann Parker at St Ethelburga's Bishopsgate where her father was rector. He was appointed Chief Justice of the Colony of New Zealand by the Colonial Office in January 1841 (warrant under Royal sign manual 5 February 1841; sworn 10 January 1842), and arrived in New Zealand in August 1841.

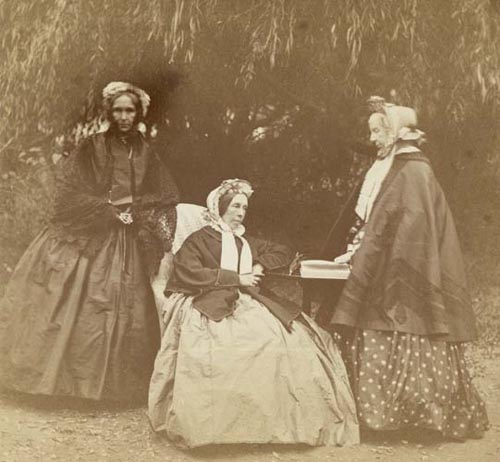
Caroline Abraham, Mary Ann Martin and Sarah Selwyn

He worked in New Zealand with Henry Samuel Chapman, who in 1843 was appointed Judge for New Munster, the southern province of New Zealand including Wellington and the South Island, and was resident judge at Wellington for eight years to 1852. They produced the 1852 Report on Supreme Court Procedure for New Zealand. Sir William also sat on circuit as a judge around New Zealand. Martin, the Attorney-General William Swainson and Thomas Outhwaite, the first Registrar of the Supreme Court, were responsible for setting up the New Zealand judicial system.

Martin, a friend of Bishop George Selwyn was sympathetic to the missionary and evangelical aspirations of the Anglican Church in the South Pacific, and to the Māori. Martin was appointed one of the two lay members of the council of St John’s College in 1850; and acted as a co-examiner with Bishop Selwyn of candidates for ordination in the Anglican church.

He wrote protests against the Crown's disregard of its moral obligations under the Treaty of Waitangi and the invasion of Taranaki.

He resigned on 12 June 1857, and was knighted in 1860. Martin was one of the authors of a book written in support of the native people of New Zealand called Extracts of letters from New Zealand on the war question. He created it with his wife, Mary Ann, George and Sarah Selwyn, Charles Abraham and his wife Caroline. This book was distributed privately after being printed in London in 1861. He returned to England in 1874, dying at Torquay in 1880.

As a judge, Sir William Martin was courteous and patient, but firm, impartial, and of unimpeachable integrity.

Legal offices
New office	Chief Justice of New Zealand; 1841–1857	Succeeded by George Arney
