= Sarah Selwyn =

New Zealand human rights activism (1809–1907)

Sarah Harriet Selwyn
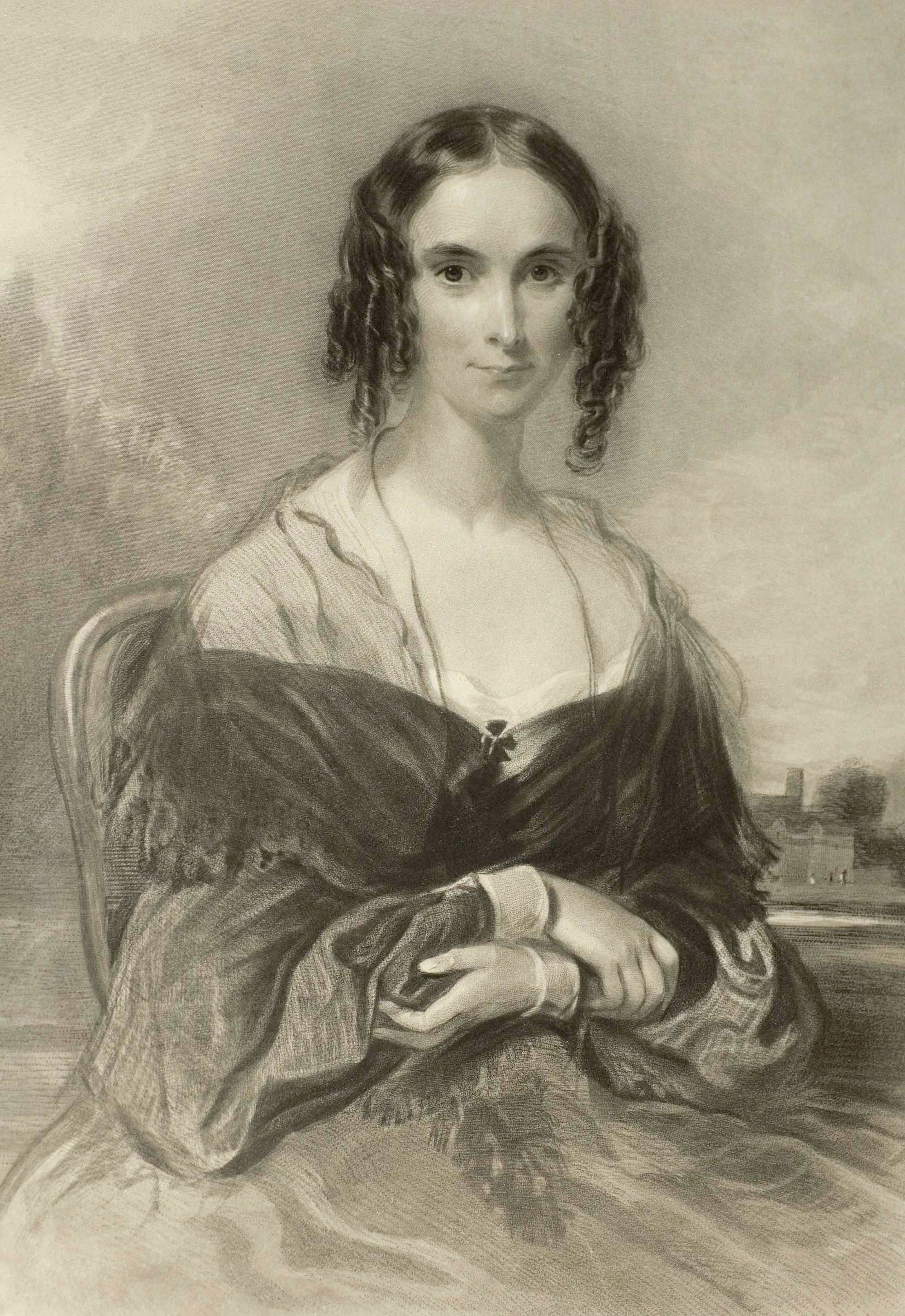
- Born: Sarah Harriet Richardson; 2 September 1809; Leicestershire, England
- Died: 24 March 1907 (aged 97); Lichfield, England
- Other names: Mata Pihopa ("Mother Bishop"); nickname "Sasa"
- Known for: pamphlets condemning British colonial policies in New Zealand
- Spouse: Bishop George Augustus Selwyn
- Parent(s): Lady Harriet and Sir John Richardson
- Relatives: cousin Caroline Harriet Abraham (née Hudson)

Sarah Harriet Selwyn (née Richardson; 2 September 1809 – 24 March 1907) was the wife of George Augustus Selwyn, the first Anglican bishop of New Zealand and later of the Diocese of Lichfield, in England. Often left behind to manage missionary stations while her husband travelled throughout New Zealand and the islands of the western Pacific Ocean, Sarah Selwyn contributed to the work of building the hierarchy of the Church of England in New Zealand from 1841 to 1868.

Her humanitarian idealism as well as her own personal experiences among the Māori people fuelled her criticism of British and New Zealand policy. Together with Mary Ann Martin and Caroline Abraham, Sarah Selwyn contributed her private correspondence for a publication protesting at the British colonial policies of land confiscation and military conquests against the Māori in New Zealand.

== Early life ==
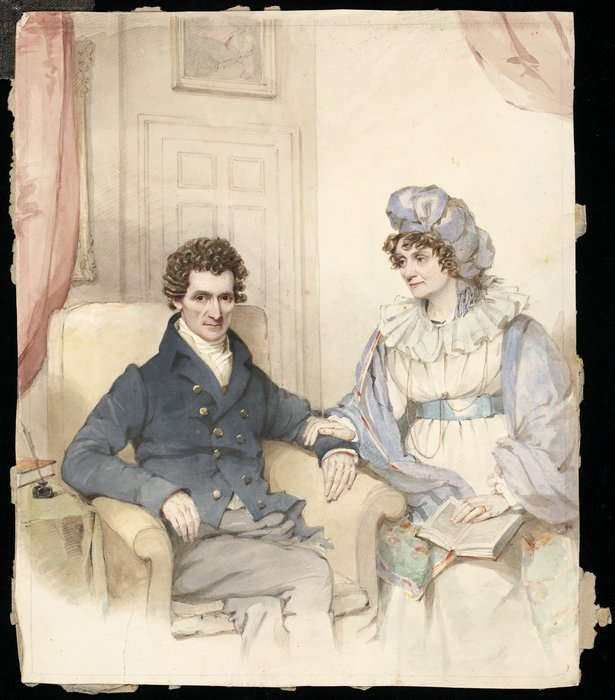
Sir John and Lady Harriet Richardson (née Hudson)

Sarah Harriet Selwyn was born 2 September 1809 in Wanlip, Leicestershire, England, at the childhood home of her mother Lady Harriet Richardson (died 1839). Wanlip Hall had been inherited by her grandmother, Catherine Susanna Palmer, the first wife of Sir Charles Hudson, 1st Baronet. She spent much of her childhood in London, but, due to his asthma, her father, Sir John Richardson (1771–1841) retired from his service as judge of the Court of Common Pleas. When she was fourteen, the family spent long periods in southern Europe, including Malta.

Sarah had no formal education, a governess for a few years, and tutors in dancing, French, writing and Latin. However, she read with her father in history and literature. Lady Harriet died in March 1839, a few months before Sarah was to be wed.

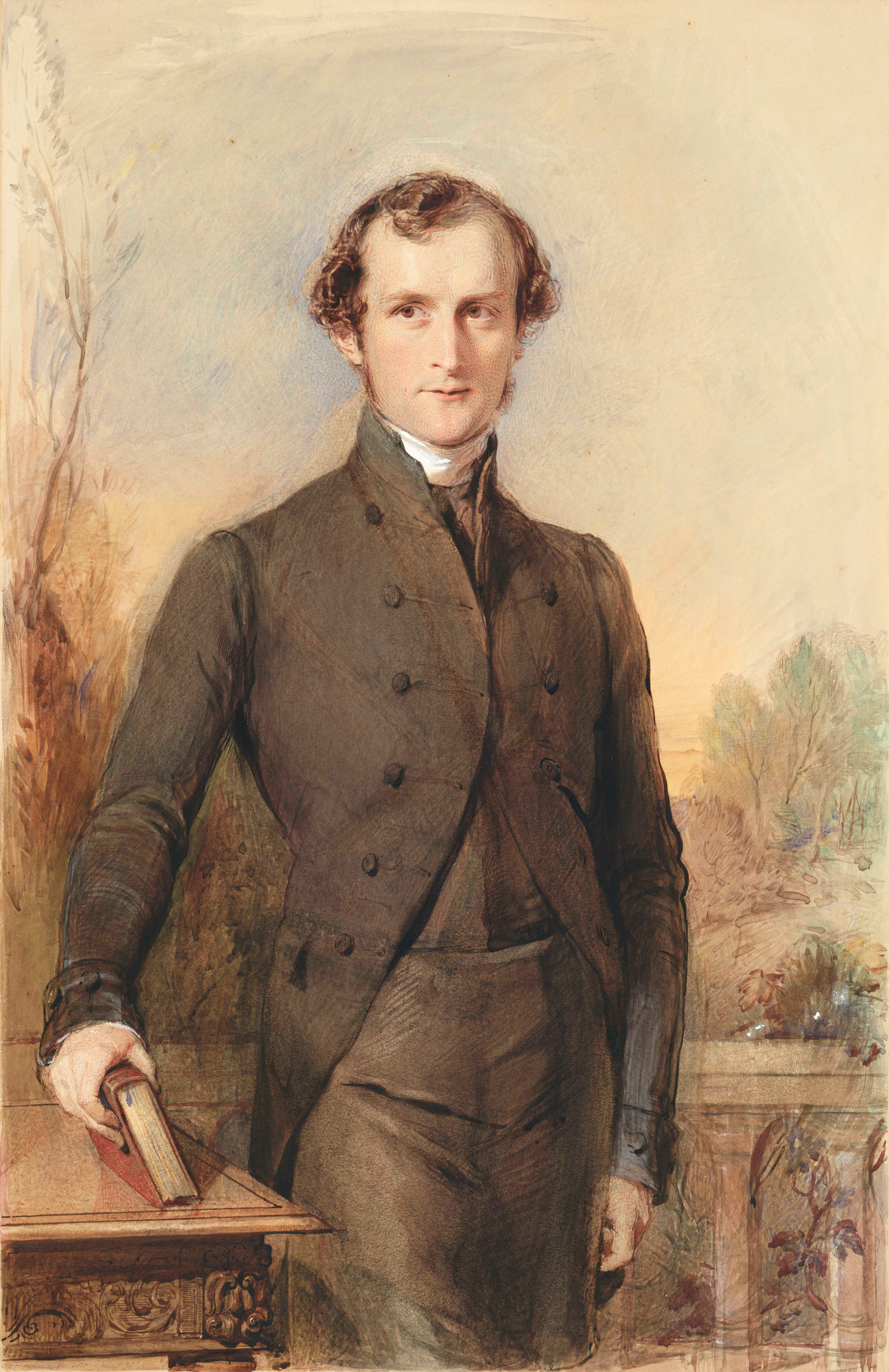
George Augustus Selwyn (1809–1878) circa 1841

At nearly thirty years of age, she married George Augustus Selwyn on 25 June 1839, at St Giles in the Fields, London. At that time he was the curate in the parish of Windsor while also serving as a tutor at Eton College.

They had two sons, both of whom became Anglican priests: William (1840–1914), who was born at Eton, and John Richardson Selwyn. Sarah Selwyn had a still-born child, and then their daughter Margaret Frances Selwyn (1850–1851) was born prematurely in Auckland, New Zealand, living only a few months before she died of a fever.

== Life in New Zealand ==
When Canon William Selwyn turned down the appointment for a new bishopric for New Zealand,{rp|13} the Archbishop offered it to his younger brother George who accepted it in July 1841. Sarah Selwyn's father, Sir John Richardson, died earlier that year at his house in Bedford Square, London, on 19 March 1841. With several servants and a toddler, Sarah prepared for their departure to New Zealand in December. Travelling aboard the Tomatin, the Selwyns and their travelling companions, also clergy along with Mary Ann Martin (wife of William Martin, New Zealand's first Chief Justice), began learning the Māori language from Rupai, a young man returning home from England.

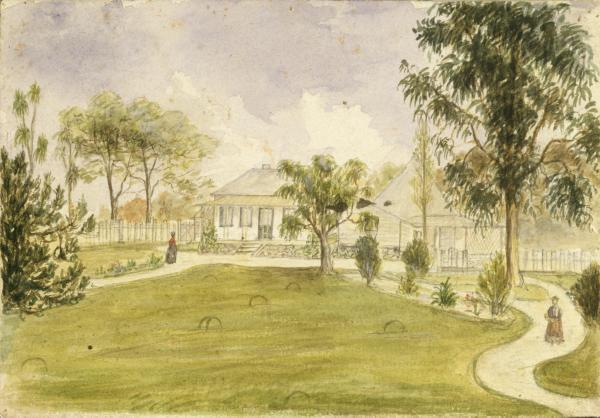
CMS Mission House at Paihia, watercolour by Rev. Henry Williams

By June 1842 Sarah Selwyn journeyed from Sydney to Paihia in the Bay of Islands in the Northland Region of the North Island of New Zealand where she lived with the Anglican missionary activists Henry Williams and his wife Marianne Williams. Here she saw the strong role of women as educators and support for Māori converts within the New Zealand Church Missionary Society (CMS). A week or so later, she moved to her first home at the Te Waimate Mission in Waimate North. There Bishop George Selwyn established St John's College using his residence and adjacent buildings to train candidates for ordination into the Anglican Church. He left within days to journey around the country for six months, and he left his wife and his chaplain, Rev. William Cotton in charge of the school.

Sarah Selwyn continued learning the language and visited the local families, attending to the sick. She was treated with great respect and became known among the Māori as Mata Pihopa (Mother Bishop). She presided over the dining hall where along with the English students and ordination candidates were Māori families as the diverse student population took their meals together alongside teachers. However, Sarah Selwyn grew increasingly sick from "severe nervous headache" and the Bishop found her a retreat where he stored his library at the Stone Store, Kerikeri. In October 1843 they journeyed to Auckland where Sarah, by then pregnant with her second child, could stay with Mary Ann Martin while the Bishop went on another journey, this time as far south as Stewart Island.

In 1844 Bishop Selwyn began moving St John's College south to West Tamaki, east of Auckland, and in June 1846 she moved with her two sons onto the campus. There she supervised and trained the married Māori converts and their children. She also started a primary school that enrolled the local children of the European settlers (the Pākehā) as well. The two women served as proof-readers for the College Press as it began producing parts of the Bible as well as schoolbooks in Māori. While the Bishop was away, Sarah Selwyn conducted the weekly audit of supplies for the college and maintained the schedule for the college schooner that was used for transportation. She oversaw the behaviour of the students as they worked to acculturate to the use of British clothes, accoutrements and manners as well as hostess for the many visitors interested in the college. Meanwhile, in buildings bought by Bishop Selwyn, the missionaries Margaret Kissling and her husband George Kissling established a Māori girls boarding school in Kohimarama (near Mission Bay) nearby until a fire destroyed it. In 1851 the Kisslings established St Stephen's School for Native Girls in Parnell which was funded by the New Zealand Female Aborigines Washing Establishment. When the Bishop expanded St Stephen's to serve as a theological school for male Māori, Margaret was supported by Mary Ann Martin and Sarah Selwyn as she took on the training of the candidates' wives and children.

In 1848, the Selwyns sent their seven-year-old son William, and then in 1853 ten-year-old John, to England to attend school at Eton College and Trinity College, Cambridge. Meanwhile, the Bishop's mission to Melanesia had more fully developed and the Melanesian Mission was founded in 1849. Sarah Selwyn supported this work as a teacher herself during her travels to the various islands with her husband. At Norfolk Island she was presented with a surf board her students had made.

By August 1850, Sarah's cousin Caroline Abraham had migrated to Auckland with her new husband the Rev. Charles Abraham who became the Master of the English department of St John's College. While the Abrahams lived there, the college campus expanded. The panorama drawn by Caroline Abraham sometime in 1851 shows that the campus included: a printing office; a wash house; the Bishop's house (a two-storied stone building); English school; dining hall; a kitchen; the Māori adult school (a two-storey building which included the weaving room and a surgery); St John's College Chapel with a belfry on its gabled roof; two school buildings; the stables as an outbuilding to the tall half-timbered weaver's house; and, a well near two more houses and the carpenter's shop.

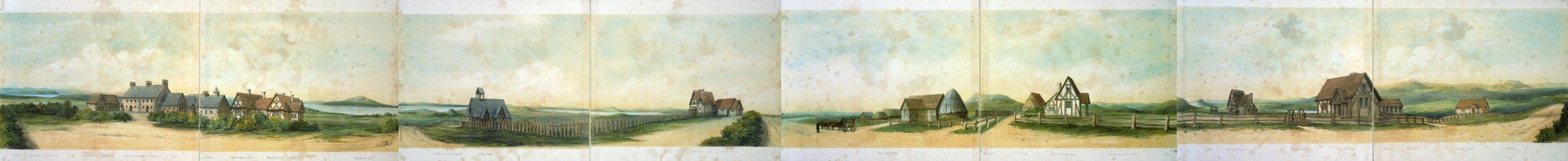
Watercolour of St John's College campus by Caroline Abraham in 1851, lithographed by Miss Cotton c1862

Margaret Frances Selwyn was born at St John's College on 5 February 1850. She died after a few months old while her father was overseas. When he returned, she was buried on 25 February 1851 in the St John's College graveyard.

Caroline Abraham wrote that "Sasa" (her nickname for her cousin Sarah Selwyn) "used to shut herself up in her room & come out only to slave away at some drudgery, or some teaching work, & look distressed & one dared not notice it, least she shd. put on a forced cheerfulness."

Sarah and George Selwyn visited England in 1854 to give updates on their work in New Zealand and recruit funders as well as more missionaries. They were invited to Windsor where they dined with Queen Victoria.

In December 1858 Mary Ann Martin and her husband William (who had resigned from the position of chief justice) came to stay at the college. Mary helped Sarah teach the children there and at St Stephens. The three women were close friends and helped each other in their various endeavours. They came to be called "The Three Graces" in colonial social circles.

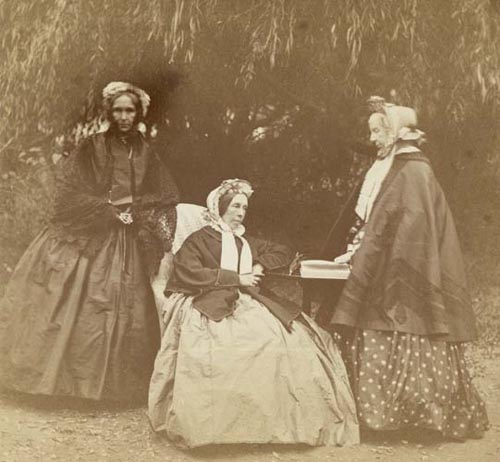
Caroline Abraham, Mary Ann Martin and Sarah Selwyn

=== Public response to the Waitara purchase ===
Bishop Selwyn had long advocated for Māori rights, and Sarah supported him in this as well as in the defence of the Treaty of Waitangi which had since 1840 recognised Māori communal ownership of their lands and other possessions. In 1859 groups of Māori led by Wiremu Kīngi Te Rangitāke opposed the colonial government's attempts to purchase land near the Waitara River in north Taranaki. This led to the military invasion by Governor Thomas Gore Browne and the Taranaki Wars. Several prominent citizens and missionaries published formal public statements in newspapers and pamphlets protesting against those politicians and settlers pushing for a military solution and uncontested access to the rich farming land held by collective groups of Māori.

Five of Sarah Selwyn's letters (dated May, August and October 1860), two by Caroline Abraham (dated October and April 1860), as well as four letters by Mary Ann Martin (dated May, August and October 1860) were included in a 106-page pamphlet, "Extracts of Letters from New Zealand." While their husbands used newspapers, public speeches and books for their writings about the events at Taranaki, the women expressed their views in personal letters to frame the issue on moral grounds. This allowed them to participate in political discourse beyond their domestic circle in New Zealand and in England. In defending her husband's objection to the Governor's actions, Sarah's private letter to her cousin Mary Anne Palmer, a sister of Caroline Abraham, (dated 30 August 1860) started with "I must write a pamphlet, or I shall burst." She argued that the colonial government, the governor, the military leaders and white settlers, all had:

... rushed into a bloody quarrel without trying all other methods of settling the dispute first; assuming that the natives are rebels before they have done one single thing to prove themselves to be so, and denying them the ordinary privileges of British subjects, which the Treaty of Waitangi declare them to be ... it goes to our hearts to see a noble race of people stigmatized as rebel, and driven to desperation, by the misrule of those who are at the same time lowering their own people in their eyes."

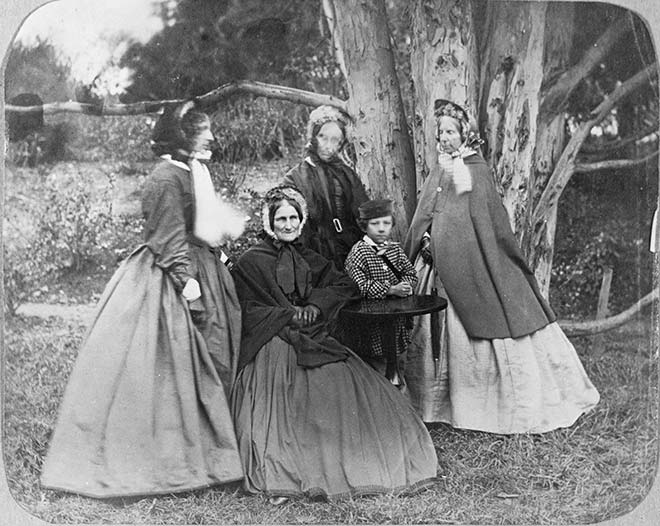
Wives of NZ Anglican bishops, probably early 1860s: (from left) Emily Harper; Sarah Selwyn; Caroline Abraham; and, (seated) Jane Williams. The little boy is thought to be Caroline Abraham's son, Charles.

Sarah Selwyn left New Zealand on the troopship Boanerges on 5 February 1861 to visit her sons at Eton. She reached England in May when the extracts of her letters were published, and her poise and calm demeanour helped their cause. Meanwhile, Bishop Selwyn had already attracted the anger of British settlers with his ideas of educating Māori to aid their assimilation as citizens and church leaders within the British Empire, and by 1865 he had angered also the Māori who were allies with the Crown. When she returned to New Zealand, she hosted the wives and widows of the British military at the bishop's residence in Auckland. She also went to stay with her cousin Caroline Abraham in Wellington where Charles Abraham served as the first bishop of Wellington. Even though Sarah Selwyn was part of the colonising wave of the Pākehā through her mission work, she protested at what she considered an illegal confiscation of Māori land. She also, in a radical way compared to other English missionary wives, challenged the growing sentiment that white settlers had an inherent superiority over the indigenous people of New Zealand. Even later in life, in her Reminiscences written in the 1890s for her children and friends, Sarah Selwyn had sharp words for "the blindness and wrong-headedness of the Ministry" during this time of war.

== Return to England ==
Sarah and her husband returned to England in order that the bishop could attend the First Lambeth Conference in 1867. While they were in England he was offered the diocese of Lichfield. He was at first reluctant to accept the position. Eventually, however, he did accept after an intervention from the Queen on condition that they be allowed to return to New Zealand in order to say their goodbyes to the country they had called home for the previous 26 years. In January 1868 Selwyn was installed as Bishop of Lichfield. George & Sarah Selwyn returned to New Zealand accompanied by their son John in mid-1868. Sarah, Bishop Selwyn and John finally sailed for England together with the Abrahams on 20 October 1868 and arrived on 31 December. Charles Abraham later resigned his see of Wellington and joined Bishop Selwyn as assistant bishop in 1870. Sarah oversaw the addition of two wings to the bishop's residence at Lichfield, and she often hosted visitors from New Zealand. Her son John was ordained a deacon by Bishop Selwyn in 1869, and he became a priest the following year. Caroline Abraham lived near her cousin Sarah in the Cathedral Close, and Sarah visited her often as Caroline became bedridden with ill health. In 1874 her friend Mary Ann Martin returned to England and settled also at Lichfield.

== Widowhood and death ==
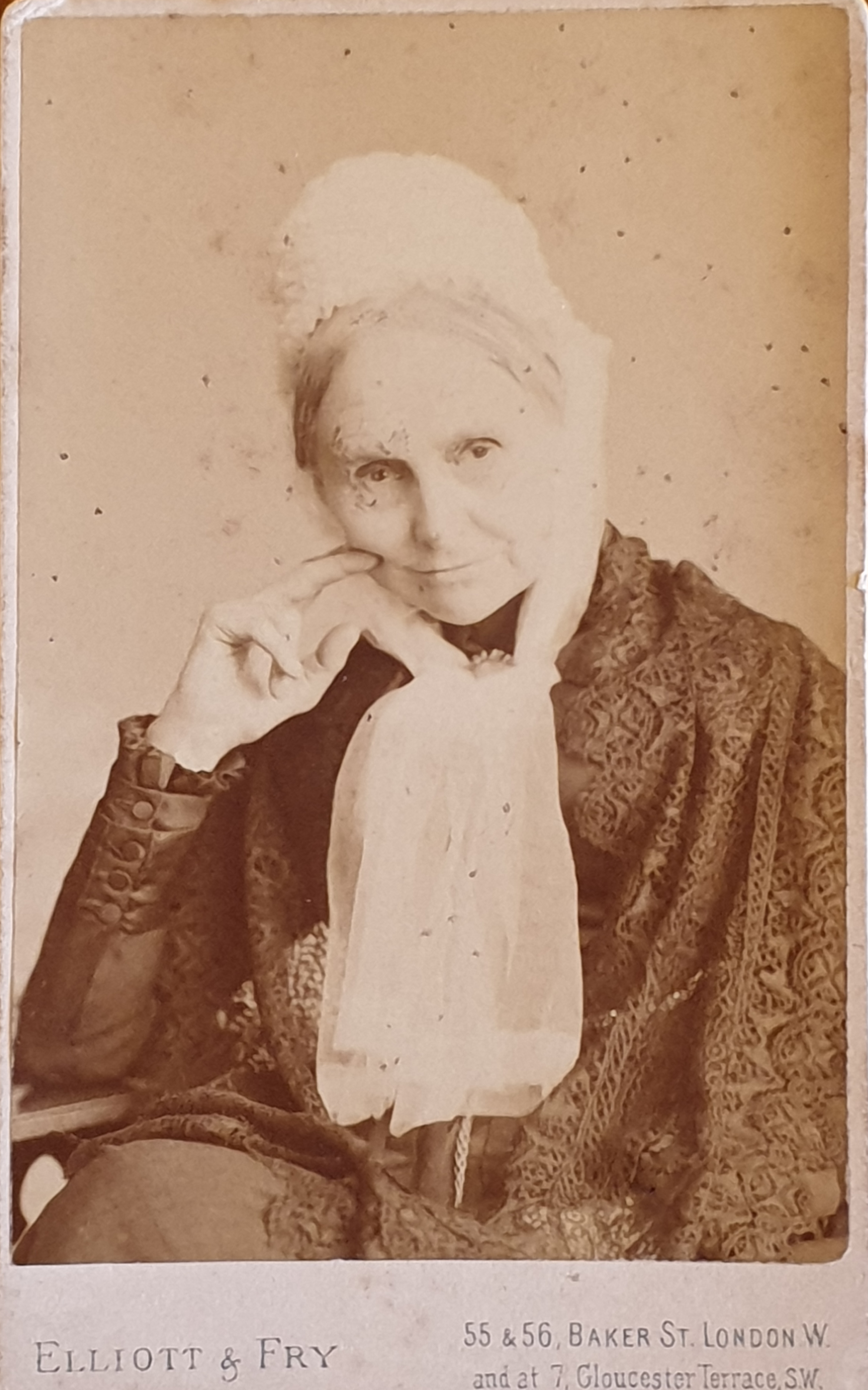
Carte de Visite of Sarah Harriet Selwyn in later life

Bishop Selwyn died on 11 April 1878, and he was buried at Lichfield Cathedral.

At the request of Sarah Selwyn, a two-volume biography of the Bishop was published within a year. By January 1892, she finished her own Reminiscences, 1809–1867 which referenced her letters and journals. Historian Charlotte Macdonald described Sarah Selwyn as "an agent of empire at the same time as a fierce critic of imperial policy."

Although suffering from ill-health her whole life, she outlived her son John (died 1898), who had like his father become Bishop of Melanesia and, from 1892 to 1895, had served as honorary chaplain to Queen Victoria.

On Palm Sunday, 24 March 1907, Sarah Selwyn died in Lichfield aged 97 and was buried with her husband at Lichfield Cathedral.

== Legacy ==
The Sarah Selwyn Hospital (opened in 1998) and the twenty-six acre Selwyn Village (established in 1954), provides a rest home offering dementia care and independent living located in Auckland near the Waitematā Harbour.
