= Charles Abraham (bishop of Wellington) =

First Anglican Bishop of Wellington; artist

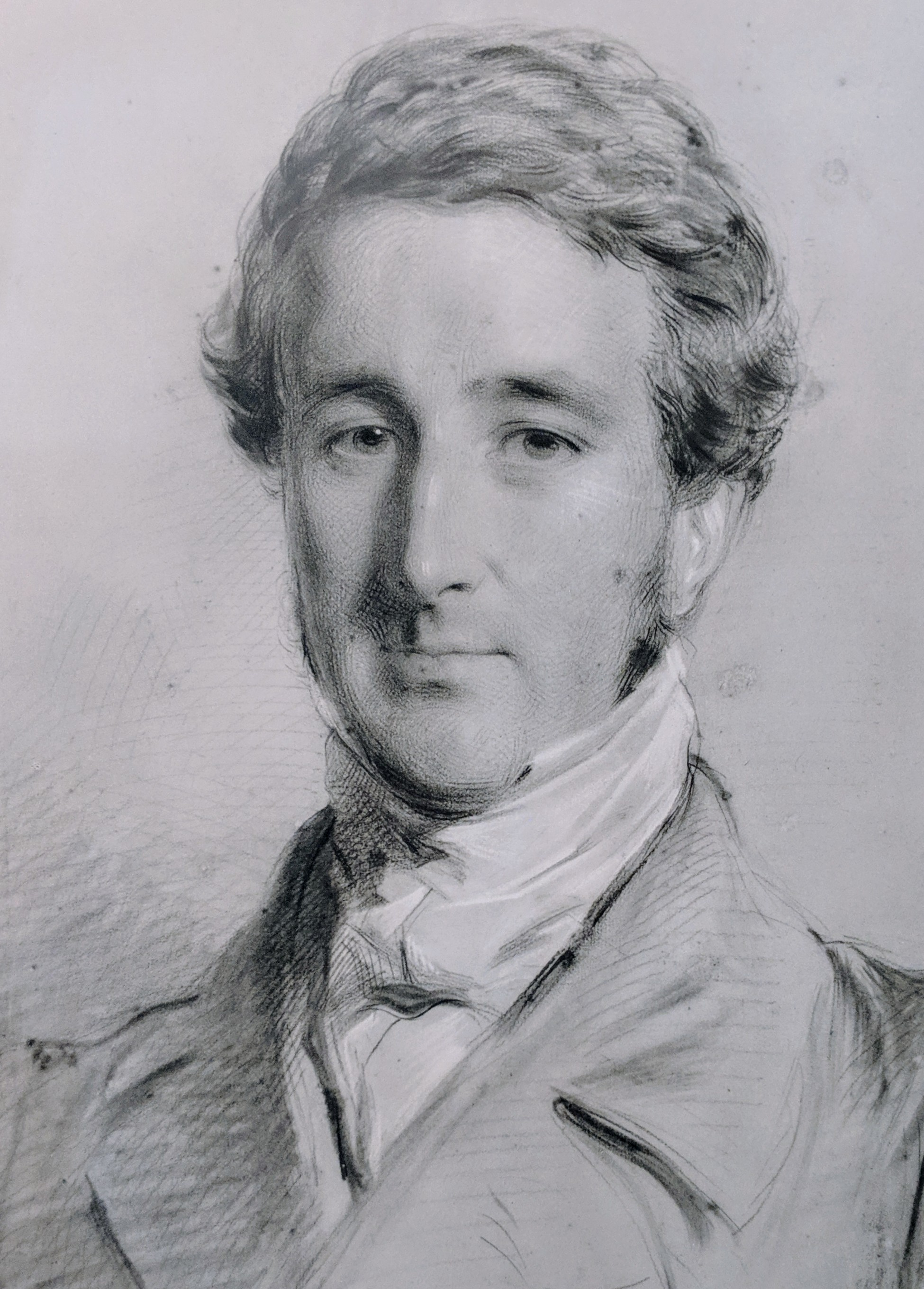
Engraving of a portrait of Charles Abraham

Charles John Abraham (1814 – 4 February 1903) was the first Anglican Bishop of Wellington. He married Caroline Palmer who became a noted artist.

== Life ==
Born in Farnborough, Hampshire, in 1814, the son of Royal Navy captain Abraham, he was educated at Eton and King's College, Cambridge and was later a fellow. He gained his BA in 1837, MA (Cantab) in 1840, BD in 1849, and received the degree of DD in 1859. He was made deacon on 11 March 1838, and ordained priest 26 May 1839, both at Lincoln. He was Assistant Master at Eton until 1850, when he went out to New Zealand to become Master of the English department of St John's College, Auckland.

In 1853, he was appointed Archdeacon of Waitemata by George Selwyn, Bishop of New Zealand. Selwyn had for two or three years been offering to members of the Church of England a Church Constitution, under which they were to govern themselves; and during the two years which followed, while absent in England, he left Abraham to set out its principles.

In 1857, a convention of churchmen was held in Auckland, which resulted in the framing of the Constitution. In the following year Abraham, who had also been acting as chaplain to the bishop, was appointed first Anglican Bishop of Wellington: he was confirmed (legally taking the See) on 4 September 1858 and consecrated a bishop on 29 September by John Sumner, Archbishop of Canterbury; Samuel Wilberforce, Bishop of Oxford; and John Lonsdale, Bishop of Lichfield, at Lambeth Palace chapel. He arrived back in New Zealand 30 March 1859 and was installed at St Paul's Pro-Cathedral on 3 April.

When the New Zealand Wars broke out by reason of the purchase by the government of the Waitara block, Abraham presented a protest to the governor, claiming for the Maori as British subjects the right to be heard in the Supreme Court.

On 20 October 1868, he returned to England with Selwyn, and assisted him in the Diocese of Lichfield; he resigned his see effective 1 June 1870 and was licensed as assistant bishop (described as a coadjutor bishop) to Selwyn as Bishop of Lichfield. This office he held until Selwyn's death in 1878. From 1872 to 1876, he was Prebendary of Bubbenhall in Lichfield Cathedral, and in 1875-6 was rector of Tatenhill, Staffordshire. From 1876 to 1890 he was canon and precentor at the cathedral.

Abraham wrote "Festival and Lenten Lectures in St. George's Chapel, Windsor," 1848-9 (Parker), and other works. He was involved in correcting an early edition of the Māori Bible.

After he resigned the canonry in 1890, he lived with his son who was vicar of Bakewell. He died at the vicarage, Bakewell, on 4 February 1903.

== Family ==
Abraham married in 1850 Caroline Harriet, daughter of Harriet Pepperell and Charles Palmer, 2nd Baronet, of Wanlip Hall, Leicestershire. Caroline "Cary" Abraham was a talented artist and cousin of Sarah Selwyn, the wife of Bishop George Selwyn. She died at Bournemouth on 17 June 1877.

Their only son was Bishop Charles Abraham of Derby, and their grandson Philip Abraham was Bishop of Newfoundland.

Church of England titles
New title	Bishop of Wellington; 1858–1870	Succeeded by Octavius Hadfield
