= Mary Martin (teacher) =

New Zealand community leader, teacher and writer

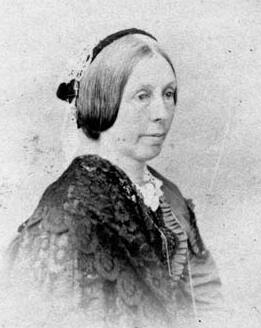
- Born: 5 July 1817
- Died: 2 January 1884
- Spouse: William Martin

Mary Ann Martin, Lady Martin (née Parker; 5 July 1817 – 2 January 1884) was an English community leader, teacher and writer in New Zealand.

== Biography ==
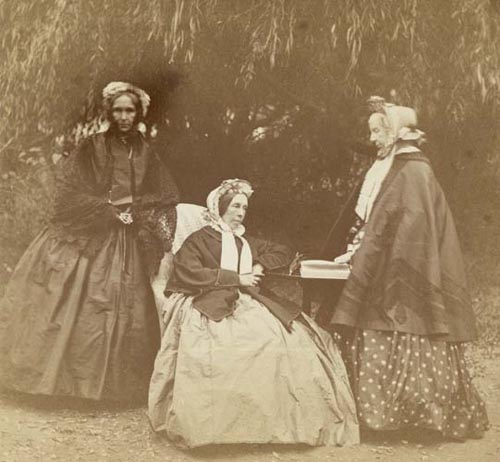
Caroline Abraham, Mary Ann Martin and Sarah Selwyn

Mary Ann Parker was born in London in 1817. Her father William Parker, a Church of England clergyman, was rector of St Ethelburga's Bishopsgate. On 3 April 1841 at St Ethelburga's, she married William Martin who had been appointed the first chief justice of New Zealand and she soon followed him to New Zealand.

In 1874 they left New Zealand for Lichfield in England, where Selwyn was bishop. After Selwyn's death in April 1878 they moved to Torquay, Devon. There Mary Martin was involved in the church and in the work of the recently founded Girls' Friendly Society. After her husband's death in 1880 she remained in Torquay until her death on 2 January 1884.

== Legacy ==
Her book, Our Maoris, was published posthumously in 1884 by the Society for Promoting Christian Knowledge.

Martin is the subject of the play On the Upside Down of the World written by Arthur Meek. It debuted at the Concert Chamber at the Auckland Town Hall in July 2011 and has been performed internationally, including at Theatre Row in New York City in 2013 and at the 2014 Edinburgh Fringe Festival. Meek said of the work:

... I wanted to be confident that we served her well; that she would jump out of her diaries and on to the stage as a fun, motivated and highly able person who rose to any challenge. I wanted—want—audiences to have a sense of her as an original Kiwi battler.
