= Sir Charles Hudson, 1st Baronet =

English businessman and aristocrat

Sir Charles Hudson Bt FRS
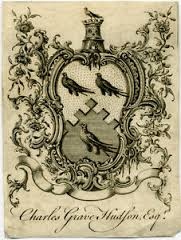
- bookplate
- Born: 3 April 1730; Tunis
- Died: 24 October 1813 (aged 83); Wanlip
- Known for: High Sheriff of Leicestershire

Sir Charles Grave Hudson, 1st Baronet FRS (3 April 1730 – 24 October 1813) was a director of the South Sea Company and became a High Sheriff of Leicestershire in 1783. He was a Fellow of the Royal Society and he became a baronet on 21 June 1791. He married well and became the owner of Wanlip Hall in Leicestershire.

== Life ==
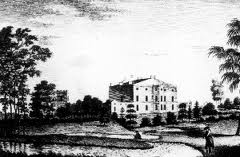
Wanlip Hall

Hudson was born in Tunis in 1730 to Joseph Hudson, a Dutch consul, and Sarah (born Plowman). Charles was the second and last child and only son. His elder sister, Jane Catharine, married in 1769 George Keate, poet, writer, and friend of Voltaire. Their daughter, his niece, was Georgiana Keate Henderson, a painter.

Hudson was elected a Fellow of the Royal Society in 1757 as a ""curious enquirer into natural philosophy"

Hudson married Catherine Susanna Palmer, daughter of Henry Palmer of Wanlip Hall, Leicestershire. Catherine was the eldest of four daughters, all co-heiresses; as part of the marriage settlement, Hudson had to make payments to his wife's sisters to balance the inheritance from his father-in-law. Hudson extended and improved this imposing building, originally constructed about 1750 beside the River Soar. The couple had eight children. Catherine died and Hudson remarried.

Hudson had interest in slave plantations in Surinam. He was also a director of the South Sea Company. He became a High Sheriff of Leicestershire in 1784 and a baronet in 1791.

Hudson died in Wanlip in 1813.

== Legacy ==
In August 1804, one of Hudson's daughters, Harriet, married Sir John Richardson, a lawyer who became a judge. One of the offspring of this union was Sarah Harriet, who in 1839 married George Selwyn; they spent most of their married life in New Zealand, where he was the first bishop and she helped build up the structures of the Anglican Church there.

Hudson's son Charles Thomas succeeded to the title in 1813, taking the name of his maternal grandfather, Palmer. The 2nd baronet successfully challenged his father's 1812 will; the Master of the Rolls considered that his request that his executors pass on his wealth (2,500 pounds) to the children that were surviving 28 years after his death was too vague and remote. Caroline Harriet Palmer was a daughter of the 2nd baronet. Several years after her cousin, she too emigrated to New Zealand, having married Rev. Charles Abraham, later Bishop of Wellington. There she became a noted artist and defender of the rights of the Maori people.

Wanlip Hall remained in the Palmer family and his baronetcy was passed down via the Palmer line. The hall was demolished in the twentieth century.

Honorary titles
Preceded by Charles Loraine Smith	High Sheriff of Leicestershire; 1784–1785	Succeeded by William Vann of Belgrave
Baronetage of Great Britain
New creation	Baronet (of Wanlip Hall); 1791–1813	Succeeded by Charles Thomas Hudson Palmer
