= Hudson (later Palmer) baronets of Wanlip Hall (1791) =

Baronetage of Great Britain

Palmer (once Hudson) baronets
- Escutcheon of the Hudson, later Palmer baronets, of Wanlip Hall
- Creation date: 1791
- Status: extant
- Seat: Wanlip Hall

The Hudson, later Palmer Baronetcy, of Wanlip Hall in the County of Leicester, was created in the Baronetage of Great Britain on 28 July 1791 for Charles Grave Hudson, a Director of the South Sea Company and High Sheriff of Leicestershire in 1784.

In 1813 the 2nd Baronet assumed the surname of Palmer only, in lieu of his patronymic, conforming to the will of his maternal grandfather, Henry Palmer of Wanlip.

== Hudson, later Palmer baronets, of Wanlip Hall (1791) ==
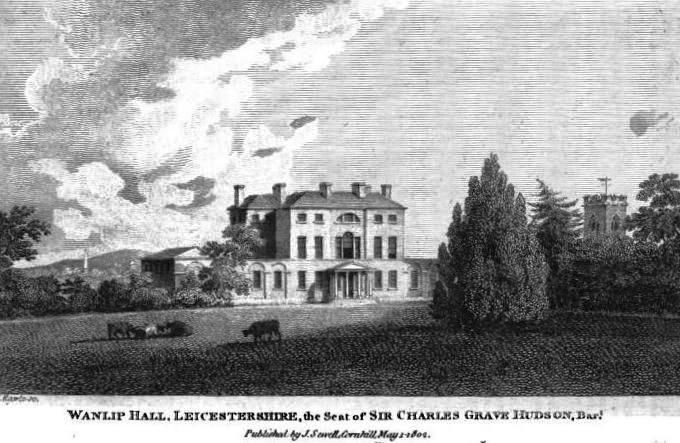
Wanlip Hall close to Leicester from the European Magazine 1809 – demolished before 1939

- Sir Charles Grave Hudson, 1st Baronet (1730–1813)
- Sir Charles Thomas Hudson Palmer, 2nd Baronet (1771–1827)
- Sir George Joseph Palmer, 3rd Baronet (1811–1866)
- Sir Archdale Robert Palmer, 4th Baronet (1838–1905)
- Sir George Hudson Palmer, 5th Baronet (1841–1919)
- Sir Frederick Archdale Palmer, 6th Baronet (1857–1933)
- Sir John Archdale Palmer, 7th Baronet (1894–1963)
- Sir John Edward Somerset Palmer, 8th Baronet (1926–2019)
- Sir Robert John Hudson Palmer, 9th Baronet (born 1960)

The heir apparent is Charles Henry Somerset Palmer (born 1992), eldest son of the above.

== See also ==
- Palmer baronets

== Notes ==
Baronetage of Great Britain
Preceded by Rich baronets of Shirley House (1791)	Hudson baronets of Wanlip Hall; 28 July 1791	Succeeded by Tapps baronets
