= William Pepperrell the younger =

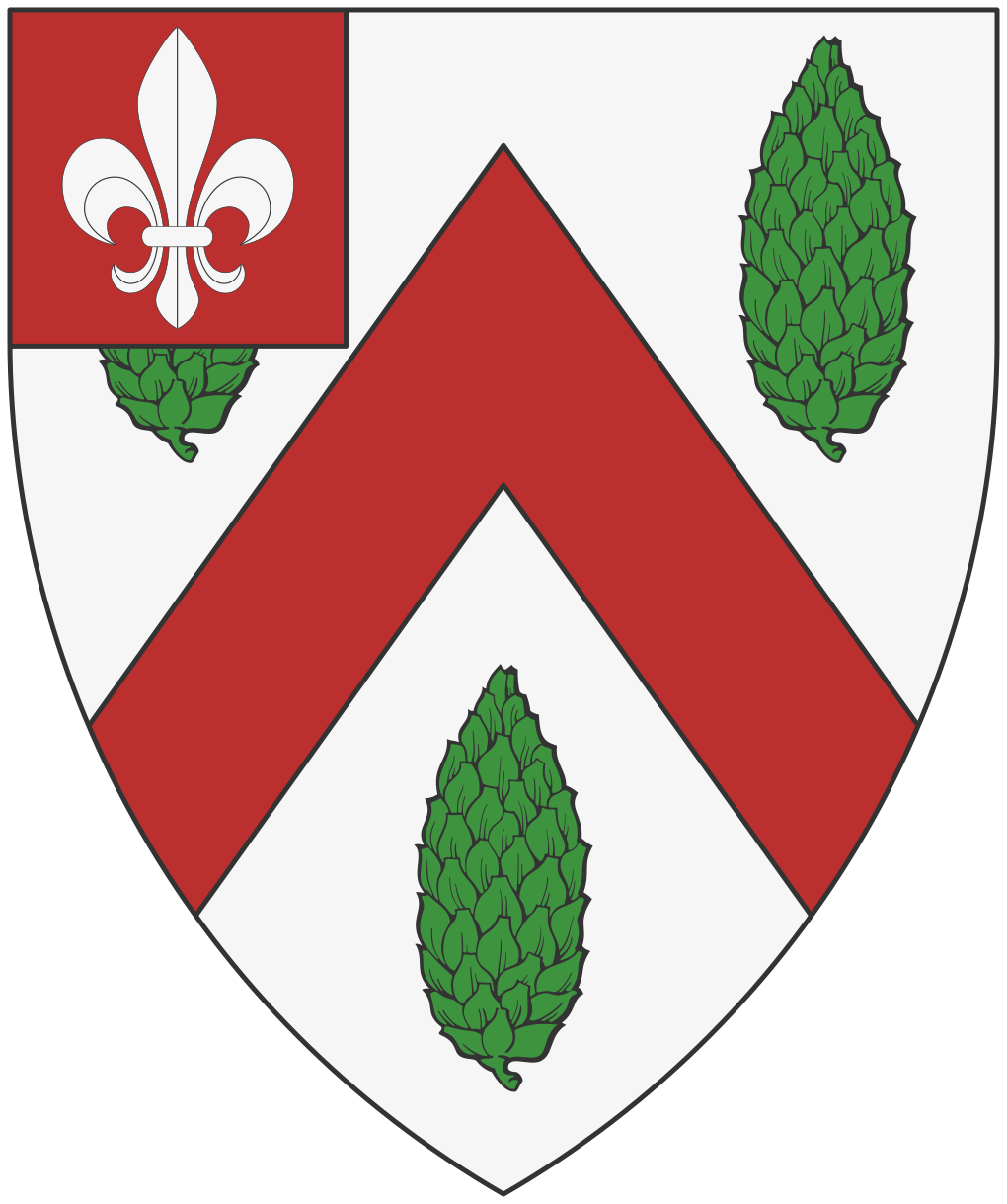
Escutcheon of the Pepper(r)ell baronets of Boston

Sir William Pepperell, 1st Baronet (1746–1816) of Boston, of the 2nd creation, or Pepperrell, birth name William Sparhawk, was an American landowner. The grandson on his mother's side of Sir William Pepperell, 1st Baronet of the 1st creation, he inherited most of his grandfather's estate; but as a Loyalist of the American Revolutionary War then lost it.

== Early life ==
William Sparhawk was born at Kittery Point, at that time in York County, Massachusetts, where he later resided in the Sparhawk Mansion. His parents were Elizabeth Pepperrell (1723–1797), only daughter and heir of Sir William Pepperell the elder and his wife Mary Hirst, and her husband Nathaniel Sparhawk (1715–1790) whom she married in 1742. He was a student at Harvard College, where he graduated in 1766.

His younger sister Mary (1754–1815) married the Boston physician Charles Jarvis, and his mother Elizabeth moved to the Jarvis home after the death of his father Nathaniel. The Sparhawk Mansion had been built for Elizabeth by her father.

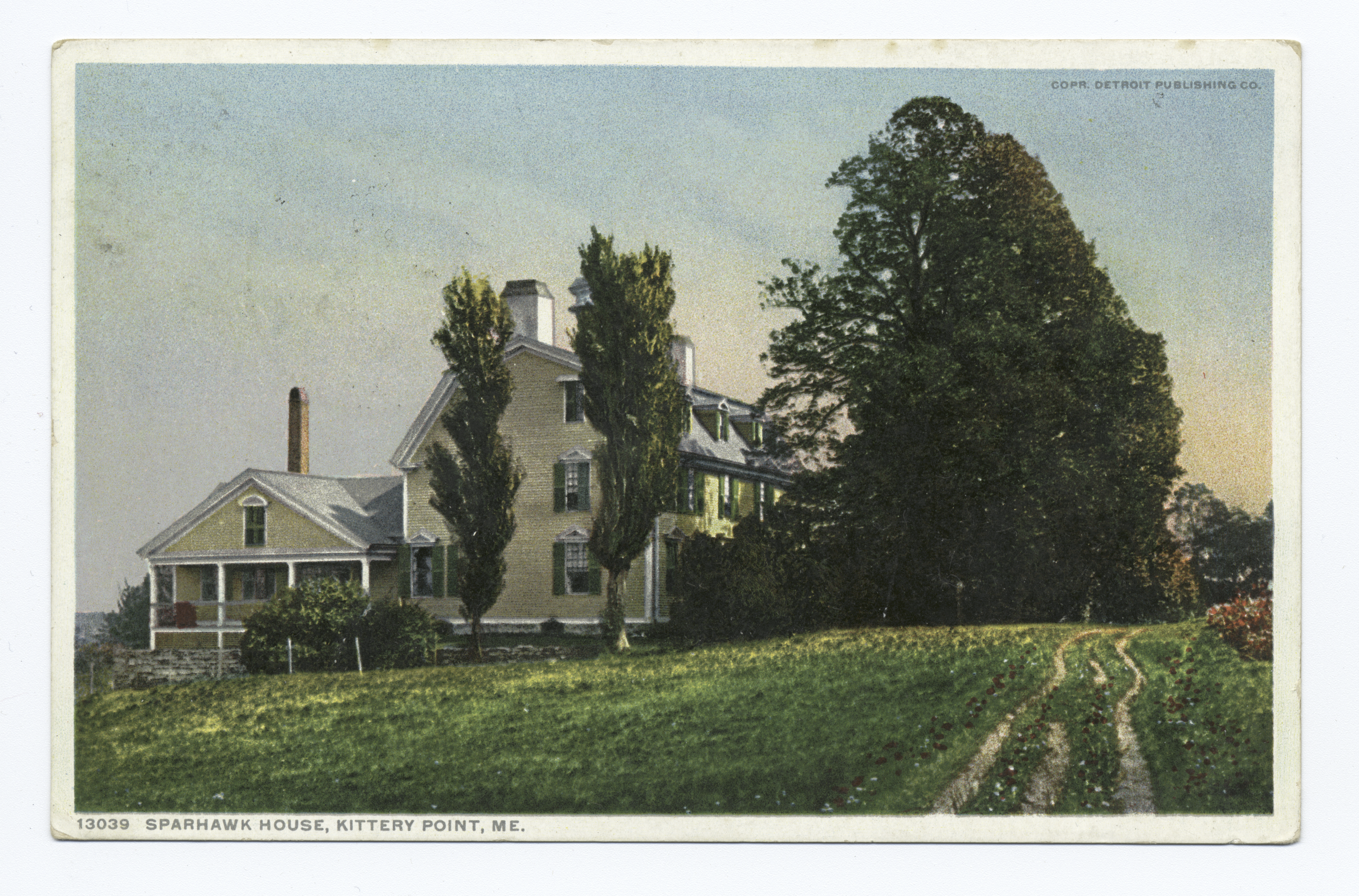
Sparhawk House, Kittery Point, postcard after 1898

== Pepperell inheritance ==
Usher Parsons, in his 1855 biography of Sir William Pepperell the elder, wrote:

In his will, rewritten with great care in January, 1758, he gives, after the decease of his wife and daughter, portions of her real estate to his grandchildren, Nathaniel, Andrew, Samuel, and Mary Sparhawk; but the great bulk of it, including his Saco lands, was left, unspecified, to a fourth grandson, William, as residuary legatee, on condition of his changing his name from Sparhawk to Pepperrell. All these grandsons remained loyalists or tories, and left the country, and these vast domains passed into other hands.

== Later life ==
Pepperell was a Councillor and Mandamus Councillor in the Province of Massachusetts Bay.

As Loyalists, Pepperell and his family left America for Great Britain in 1775. His wife Elizabeth died at the age of 26 on October 9, 1775, during the voyage, of smallpox, and was buried in The Old Burying Ground, Halifax, Nova Scotia. He was proscribed in the Massachusetts Banishment Act of 1778.

Pepperell spent the latter part of his life in London, where he helped to found the British and Foreign Bible Society. He died at home at Portman Square in 1816.

== Family ==
Pepperell married in 1767 Elizabeth Royall, third child of Isaac Royall and Mary McIntosh of Massachusetts. Their only son William Royal Pepperwell predeceased his father, in 1798 (Foster) or 1808 (Bowen), and the title became extinct in 1816. The couple's three daughters were associated by family connections with West Indian planters. They were:

- Elizabeth Royall (1769–1855), married c.1799 Henry Hutton (died 1833), rector of Beaumont, Essex. They had four sons and six daughters. Of the daughters: Elizabeth married William Moreton and was mother of Elizabeth Moreton (1821–1912) of Clewer House of Mercy who inherited Little Moreton Hall in 1896; and Mary Anne married the Rev. William Walford and was mother of Edward Walford.
- Mary Hirst McIntosh (1771–1739), married in 1799 William Congreve of Aldermaston Hall. She left no issue.
- Harriet or Harriot (1773–1848), married in 1802 Charles Thomas Hudson, son of Sir Charles Hudson, 1st Baronet. They had six children.
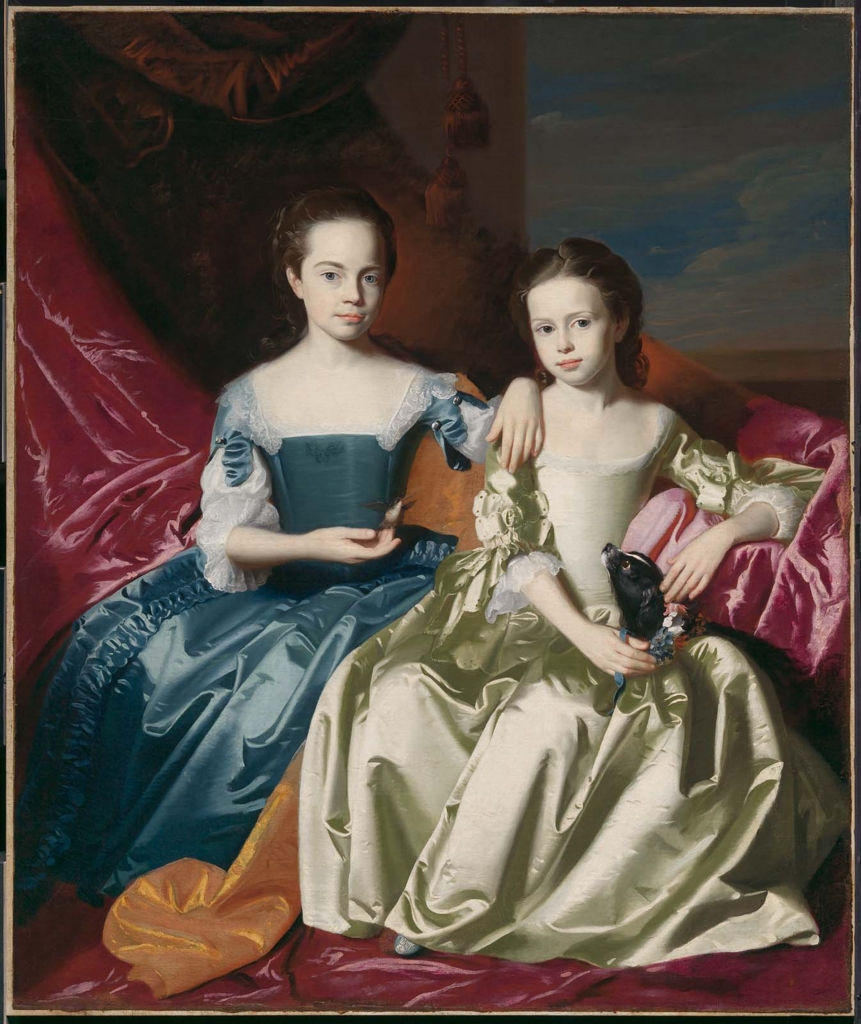
Mary and Elizabeth Royall, 1758 double portrait by John Singleton Copley

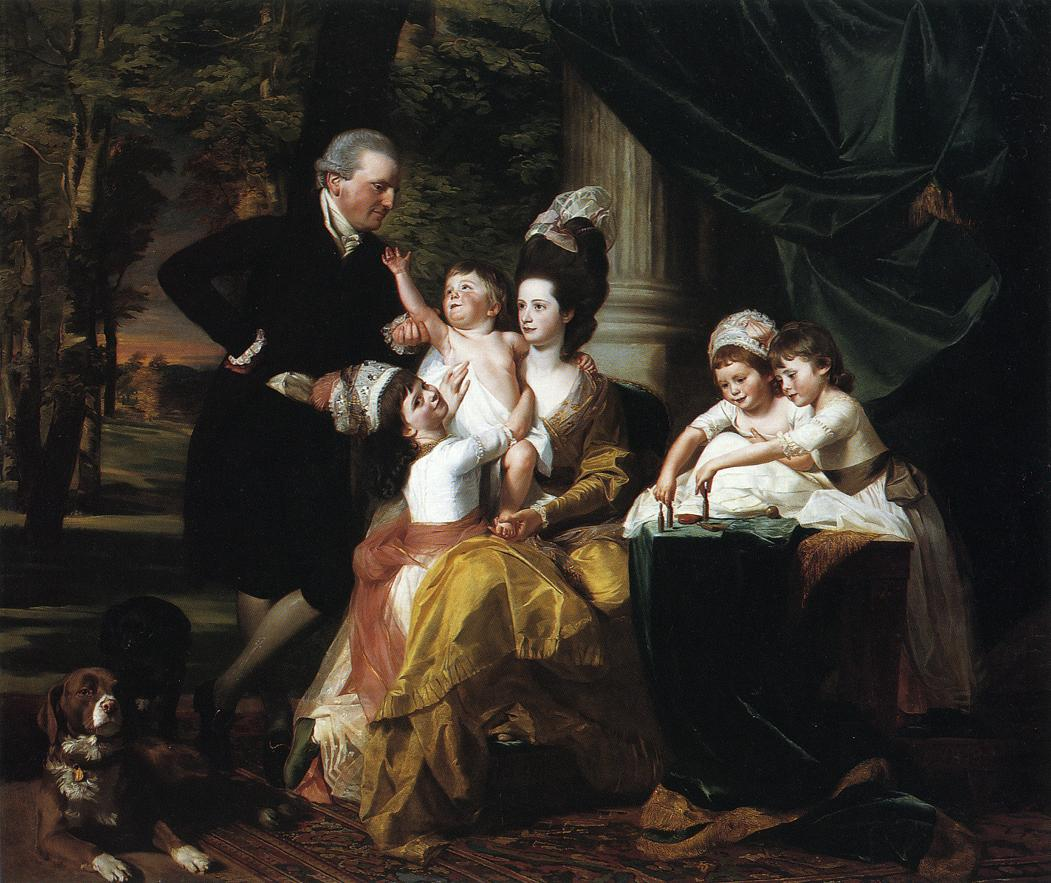
Sir William Pepperrell and His Family (1778), family group portrait by John Singleton Copley

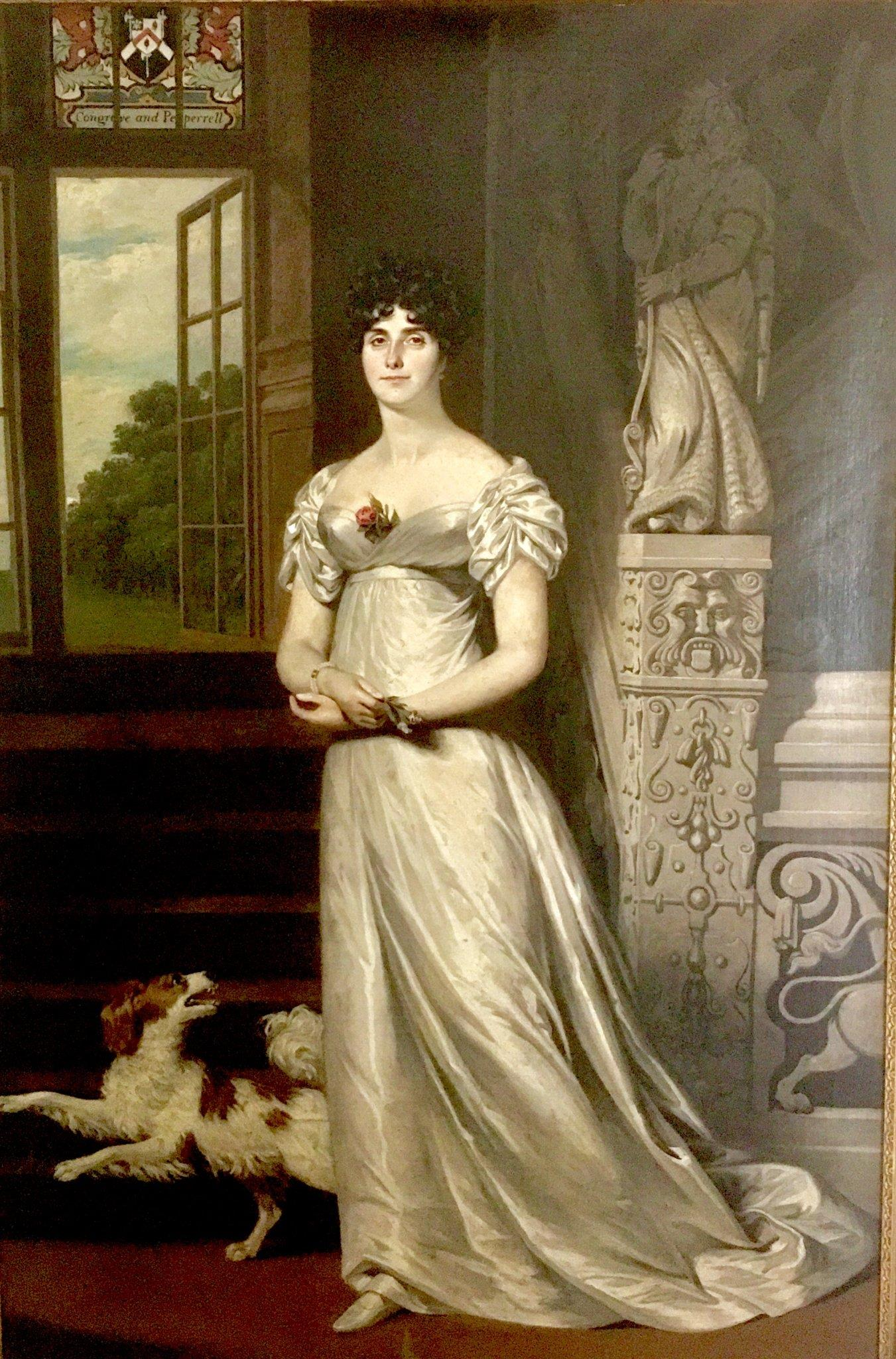
Mary Hirst Pepperell

=== Thomas Palmer ===
The plantation and slave owner Thomas Palmer in Surinam, who had married a sister of Elizabeth Royall, left his estate on his death in 1820 in equal shares to the three daughters and their husbands.

=== Joseph Royall ===
The daughters also had had monetary legacies from Joseph Royall (died 1814), slave owner in Jamaica. The family connection was left open by Vere Langford Oliver, who gave Royall's birth date as 5 May 1721; Edward Doubleday Harris in The New-England Royalls makes a probable identification with the son Joseph, born 13 May 1721 in Dorchester, of Robert Royall (1688–1757). He died in Great Cumberland Street, London, on 3 June 1814, aged 93.

== Notes ==
Baronetage of Great Britain
Preceded by Duntze baronets	Pepperell baronets of Boston; 9 November 1774	Succeeded by Warren baronets
