= Sir Charles Palmer, 2nd Baronet =

English landowner

Charles Thomas Hudson Palmer
- Born: 20 May 1771; Wanlip Hall, Leicestershire
- Died: 30 April 1827 (aged 55)

Sir Charles Thomas Hudson Palmer, 2nd Baronet (20 May 1771 – 30 April 1827) was an English landowner. His family seat was in Wanlip Hall in Leicestershire.

== Life ==
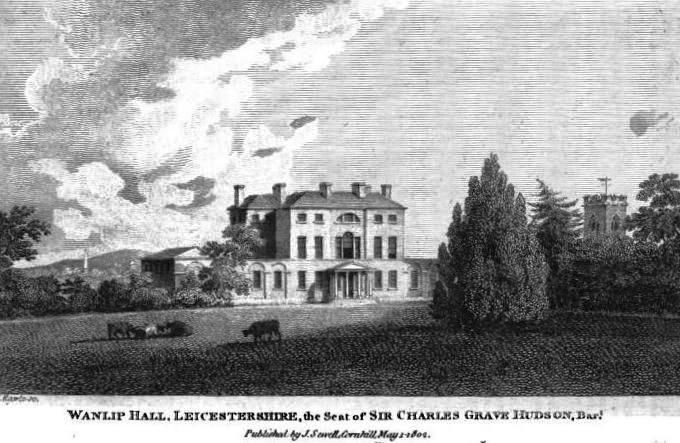
Wanlip Hall from The European Magazine 1809.

Charles Thomas Hudson was born on 20 May 1771 to Sir Charles Hudson, 1st Baronet of Wanlip Hall and his wife Catherine Palmer.

He succeeded to the title in 1813. Under the terms of his maternal grandfather's will, he changed his name to Palmer and what had been the Hudson baronetcy became the Palmer baronetcy of Wanlip Hall. He successfully challenged the will that the first baronet had written shortly before his death. The Master of the Rolls considered that the 1st Baronet's request that his executors pass on his fortune of £2,500 to the children that were surviving 28 years after his death was too vague and remote.

Palmer died in Wanlip in 1827.

== Family ==
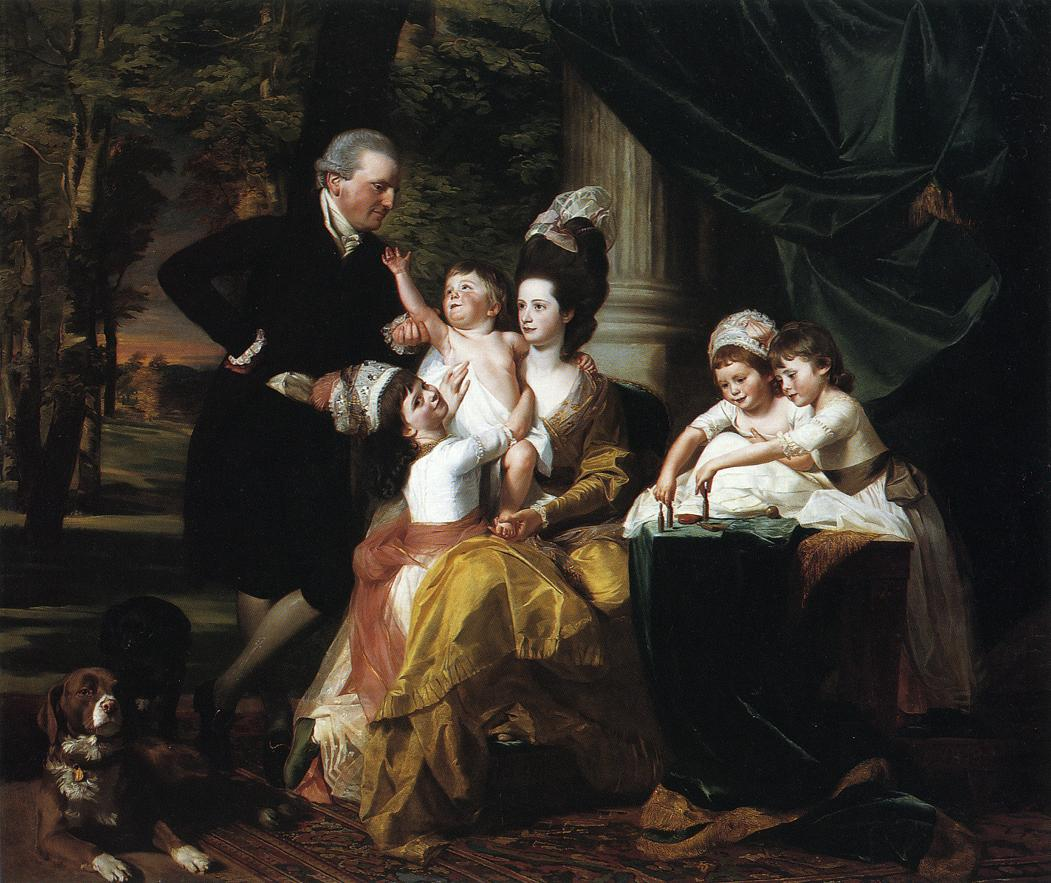
Sir William Pepperrell, 1st Baronet and his family, by John Singleton Copley, 1778

In 1805 Hudson, as he still was then, married Harriet Pepperell (born on 17 December 1773), one of the three daughters of the Anglo-American Sir William Pepperell of Boston and Elizabeth the daughter of Isaac Royall. A portrait of William Pepperell and his three daughters and short-lived son was painted by John Singleton Copley in 1778.

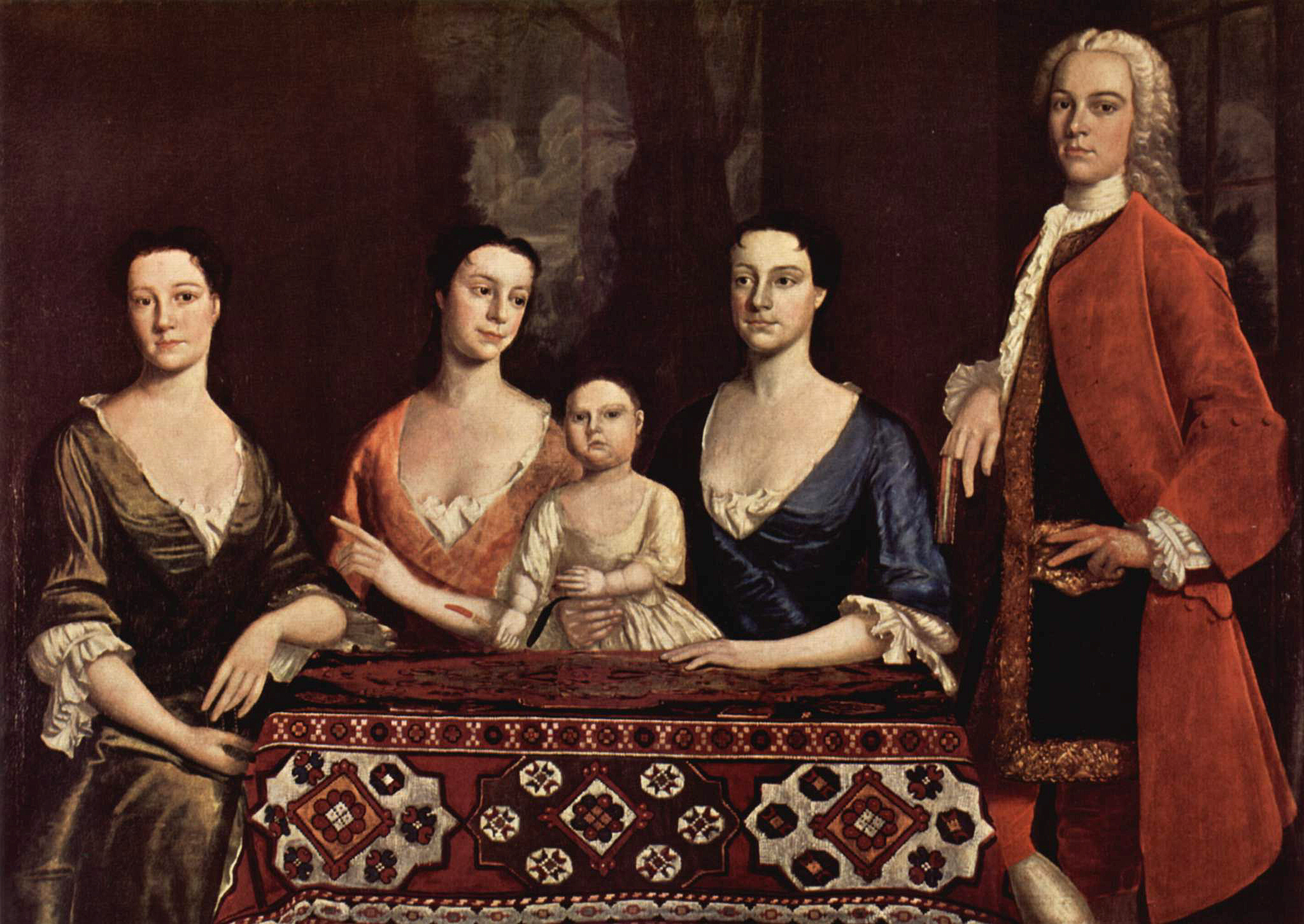
Isaac Royall and his family by Robert Feke – the child in the centre would become Hudson's mother-in-law

Hudson's marriage was important as it linked his family not only to the Pepperell inheritance, but also connected him to the American Royalls. The latter had become rich due to their Antiguan slave plantations. Both Isaac Royall and Hudson's father had interest in slave plantations in Surinam.

In 1803 Charles and Harriett had Louisa and in 1806 came Mary Ann. A third daughter, Caroline Harriet, was born in 1809, followed by the heir, George Joseph, in 1811. His final two children were Charles Axdale and William Henry.

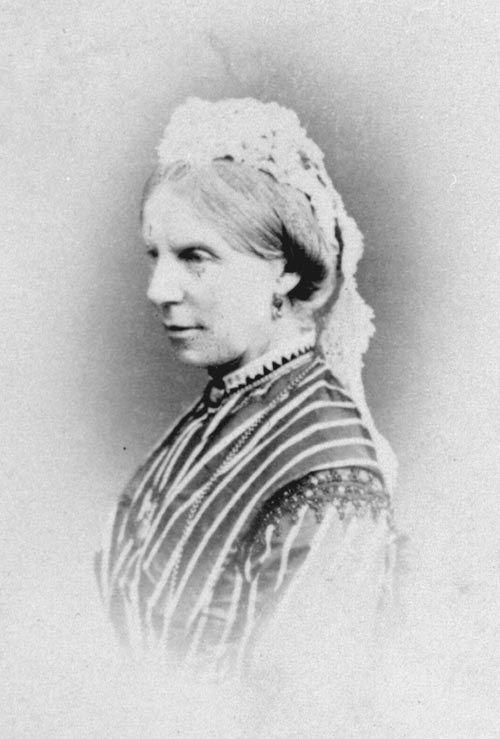
Caroline Harriet Abraham was his daughter

His third daughter was notable in the history of New Zealand. She married Rev. Charles Abraham, who with her able assistance became bishop of Wellington; their only child, Charles Abraham, and his son Philip Abraham, both became bishops. It is under her married name, Caroline Harriet Abraham that she became known as an artist and defender of Maori rights.

His heir, George, married Emily Elizabeth Holford; their daughter Emily Frances married James Tomkinson, landowner and Liberal politician. Through this line are descended the Palmer-Tomkinson family, who still own much of the land in the area around Wanlip.

Baronetage of Great Britain
Preceded by Charles Hudson	Baronet (of Wanlip Hall); 1813–1827	Succeeded by George Joseph Palmer
