= Caroline Abraham =

New Zealand artist (1809–1877)

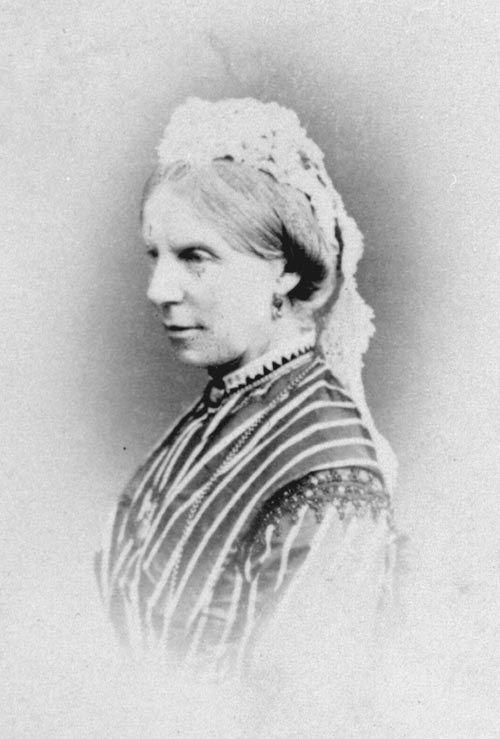
- Born: Caroline Harriet Hudson; 25 May 1809; Wanlip, Leicestershire, England
- Died: 17 June 1877 (aged 68); Bournemouth, Hampshire, England
- Other name: Caroline Harriet Palmer
- Known for: Watercolour artist; writer; wife of an Anglican bishop
- Spouse: Charles Abraham (m. 1850)
- Relatives: Charles Palmer (father); Charles Abraham (son)

Caroline Harriet Abraham (née Hudson, later Palmer; 25 May 1809 – 17 June 1877) was an English artist significant in the history of New Zealand, creating a useful record of that country in the nineteenth century. She was the influential wife of a bishop and the mother of another. She put together a book, with others, supporting Māori rights.

== Life ==
Caroline Harriet Palmer was born and baptised in 1809 in Wanlip, Leicestershire, England. She was the daughter of Harriet Pepperell and Charles Thomas Hudson. In 1813, her father succeeded to the Palmer baronetcy of Wanlip Hall and changed the family name from Hudson to Palmer in order to meet the terms of an inheritance. The family seat was Wanlip Hall, which was demolished in the 20th century.

In 1850, she married the Rev. Charles Abraham and they emigrated to New Zealand shortly after, as her husband wanted to work with George Selwyn, since 1841 the Bishop there. They arrived in Auckland on 6 August 1850 with their servant. Selwyn appointed her husband to lead the multi-level educational establishment, St John's College, which he had founded in 1843. Her husband trained both Māori and European youths.

Her husband was ordained to become the Bishop of Wellington whilst on a trip to England in 1857. Her only son, Charles, was born the same year and he went on to be the Bishop of Derby.

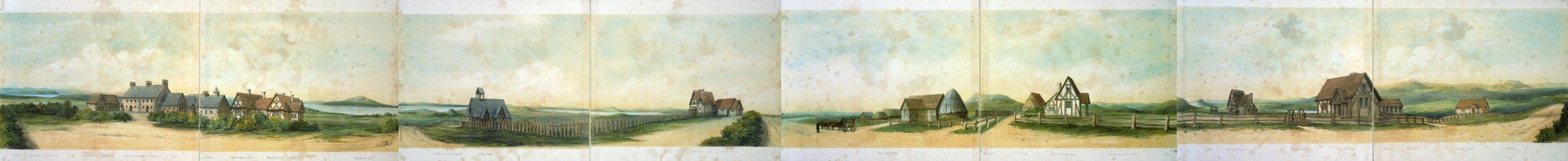
1862 panorama of St John's College in West Tamaki, New Zealand

Abraham was a water colourist and her scenes of early New Zealand immigrant settlements are held by the National Library of New Zealand and Auckland Council They are an important source of information from this period. During the New Zealand Wars she advocated for the Māori.

The publication that she helped create was called Extracts of letters from New Zealand on the war question and it was published in 1861. She wrote it with her cousin Sarah Selwyn, Bishop George Selwyn, her husband and Sir William and Lady Mary Ann Martin. George Selwyn was Bishop of New Zealand, and Sir William Martin was the Chief Justice. Abraham believed that the Māori people (then called natives of New Zealand and similar) were a proud race whose rights needed to be considered. This book was distributed privately after being printed in London.

In 1862 a set of eight matching lithographs were published, based on images she had created. Together they represented a panorama of West Tamaki, showing the site of St John's Chapel and school buildings in Auckland. The lithography was achieved by an unnamed sister of Rev. William C. Cotton.

In 1867 Abraham and her son returned to England in order for him to study at Eton. Three years later, her husband also went back to England as his friend George Selwyn was to be made Bishop of Lichfield.

Abraham died in Bournemouth in 1877.

== Legacy ==
She was the wife of a bishop and the mother of another. Her paintings and sketches are held in several collections in New Zealand. One of her sketchbooks is in Auckland Public Library and this records the influence on her of classically trained, but New Zealand artists like Albin Martin and John Hoyte.
