= Wanlip Hall =

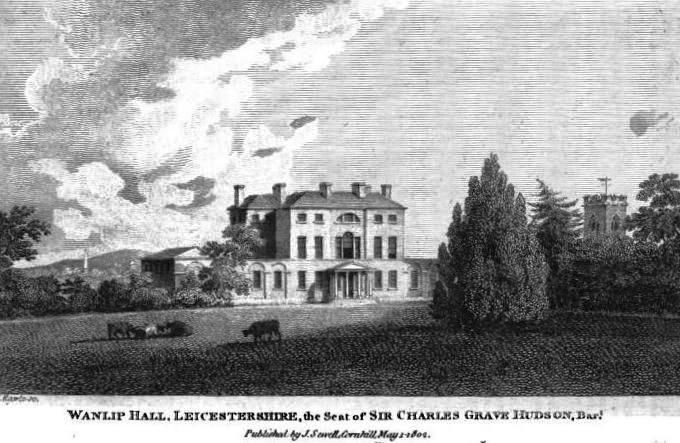
- from the European Magazine 1809
- Interactive map of the Wanlip Hall area

General information
- Type: Home
- Location: by the River Soar in Wanlip, Wanlip, Leicestershire
- Coordinates: 52°41′37″N 1°06′37″W
- Construction started: c. 1750
- Demolished: 1939
- Client: Palmer family

Wanlip Hall was a large house in Wanlip near the English city of Leicester. It was the ancestral home of the Palmer family. The building was demolished before the Second World War.

== History ==
There was a hall in Wanlip that came into the possession of Walter Palmer of Staffordshire in 1622 from Sir Walter Aston. The Palmer family were only the third family to own the manor in the last 800 years. This former hall was designed for defence and it had castle-like properties.

The older hall was demolished and it was replaced by the Palmer family with a new hall in about 1750. They later extended and improved this imposing building that stood beside the River Soar.

The first baronet was Charles Grave Hudson. He married Harriet who was one of the three daughters of Sir William Pepperell of Boston. Harriet's mother was Elizabeth, the daughter of the rich American Isaac Royall. There is a portrait of William Pepperell and his family by John Singleton Copley.

When the nearby river was canalised a plan was created to avoid the new canal coming into Wanlip. Charles Grave Hudson became a baronet before he died in Wanlip in 1813.

The second baronet to live here was Charles Thomas Hudson Palmer who took the name of Palmer. The hall continued in the ownership of the Palmer baronets. Unlike many neighbouring manors, the Palmer family resisted the trend to sell off land. The few families that did live at Wanlip eventually moved away leaving the Palmer family as the sole owners and occupiers of 900 acres of land. This family did make changes but they reputedly treated the villagers as if they were under their control. In 1901, Archdale Palmer who owned the land died and his widow, Lady Augusta, lived on at Wanlip Hall until 1933. The hall was demolished in 1938.

Today the land is in the possession of Palmer family descendants.

== Notable residents ==
- Caroline Abraham (born Palmer) was an artist in New Zealand
