= George Selwyn (bishop of New Zealand) =

New Zealand clergyman (1809–1878)

The Right Reverend George Selwyn
- Bishop of Lichfield
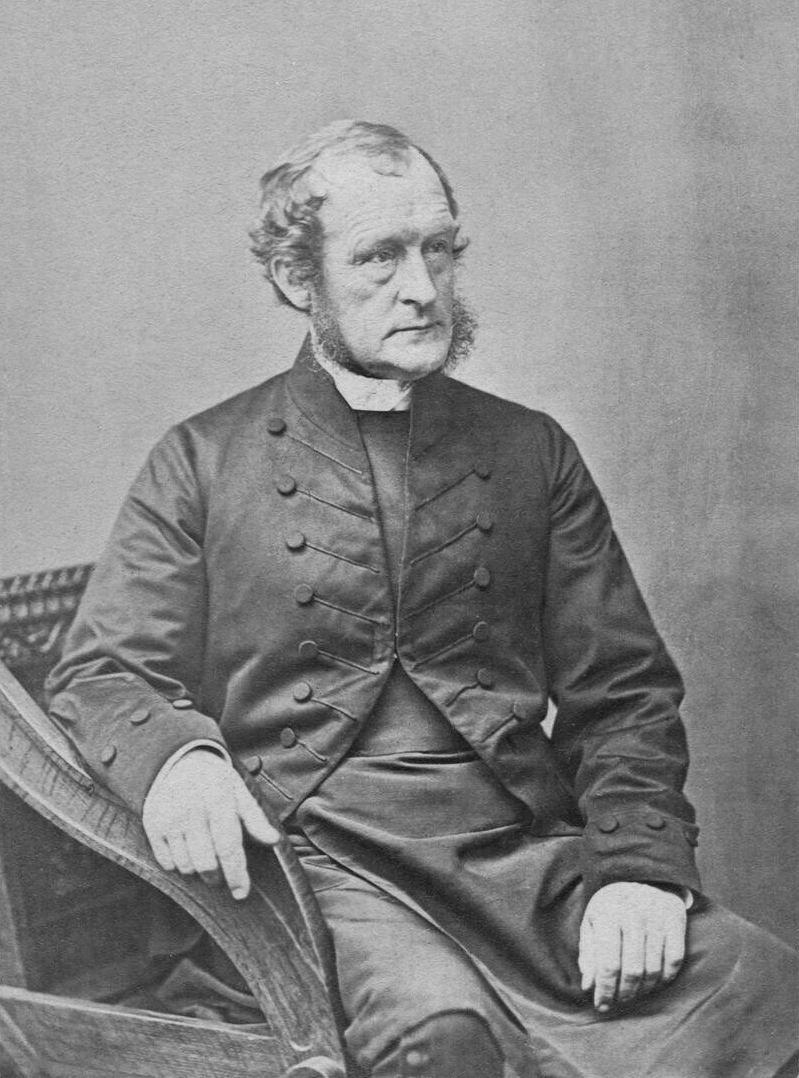
- Selwyn in 1867
- Church: Church of England
- Diocese: Diocese of Lichfield
- In office: 1868 to 1878
- Predecessor: John Lonsdale
- Successor: William Maclagan
- Other posts: Bishop of New Zealand (1841–1868); Primate of New Zealand (1858–1868)

Orders
- Ordination: 1833 (deacon); 1834 (priest)
- Consecration: 17 October 1841

Personal details
- Born: 5 April 1809 Church Row, Hampstead, England
- Died: 11 April 1878 (aged 69) Bishop's Palace, Lichfield, England
- Denomination: Anglican
- Spouse: Sarah Harriet Richardson (m. 1839)
- Children: 2 including John Selwyn
- Education: Eton College, St John's College, Cambridge

Sainthood
- Feast day: 11 April
- Venerated in: Anglican Communion
- Patronage: Selwyn College, Cambridge

George Augustus Selwyn (5 April 1809 – 11 April 1878) was the first Anglican Bishop of New Zealand. He was Bishop of New Zealand (which included Melanesia) from 1841 to 1869. His diocese was then subdivided and Selwyn was Metropolitan (later called Primate) of New Zealand from 1858 to 1868. Returning to Britain, Selwyn served as Bishop of Lichfield from 1868 to 1878.

After his death, Selwyn College, Cambridge and Selwyn College, Otago were founded to honour his life and contribution to scholarship and the church. The colleges and other educational facilities uphold the legacy of the bishop.

== Early years ==
Selwyn was born at Church Row, Hampstead, the second son of William Selwyn (1775–1855) and of Laetitia Frances Kynaston. At the age of seven he went to Great Ealing School, the school of George Nicholas and his two sons, where the future Cardinal Newman and Newman's brother Francis were among his schoolfellows. He then went to Eton, where he distinguished himself, both as scholar and as athlete, and knew William Ewart Gladstone.

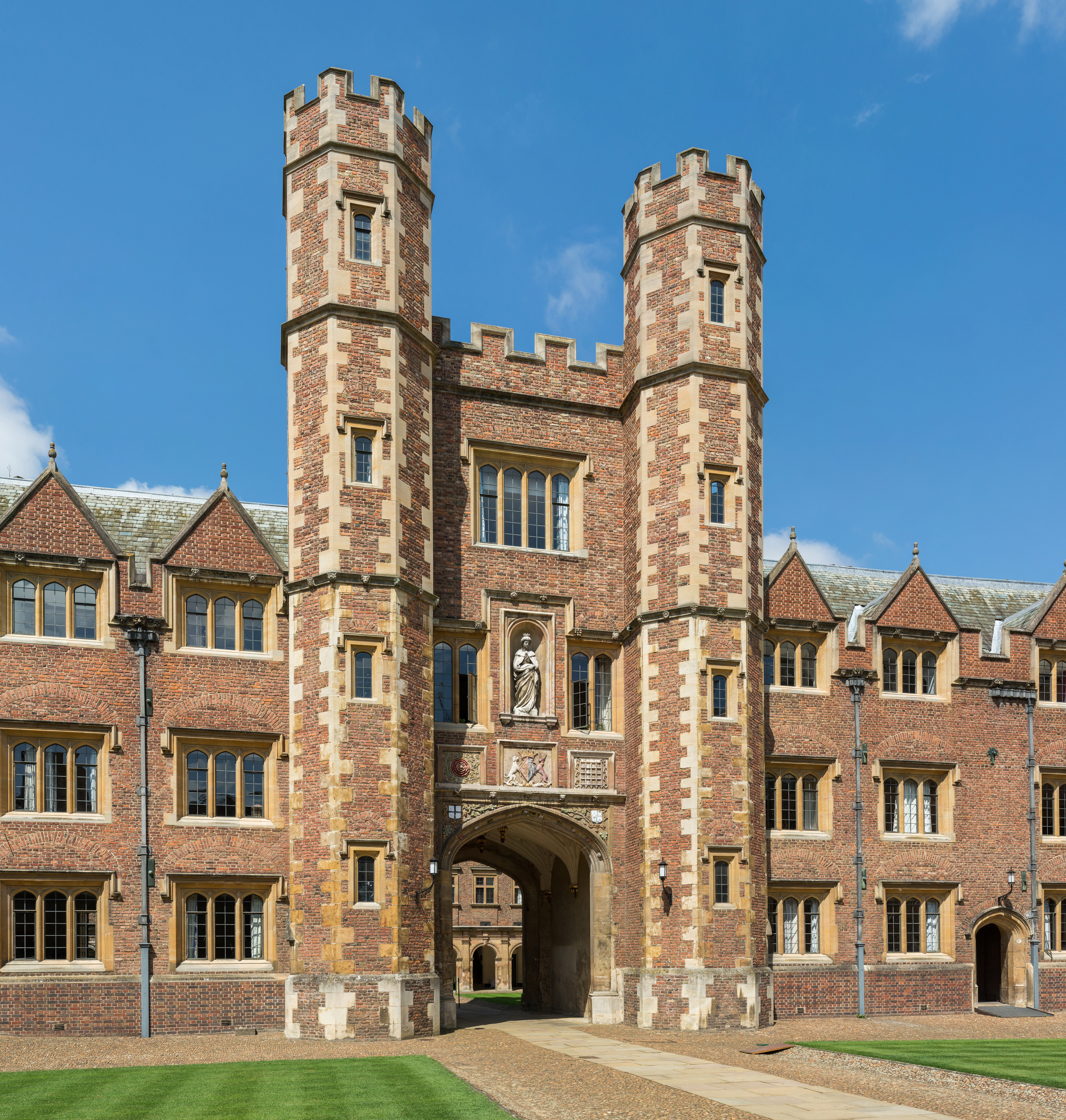
Selwyn's alma mater, St John's College, Cambridge

In 1827 he became scholar of St John's College, Cambridge. He came out second in the Classical Tripos in 1831, graduating Bachelor of Arts (BA) 1831, Cambridge Master of Arts (MA Cantab) 1834, and Doctor of Divinity (DD) per lit. reg. 1842, and was a fellow of St John's from 1833 to 1840. He was a member of the Cambridge crew which competed in the inaugural Oxford and Cambridge Boat Race at Henley on Thames in 1829.

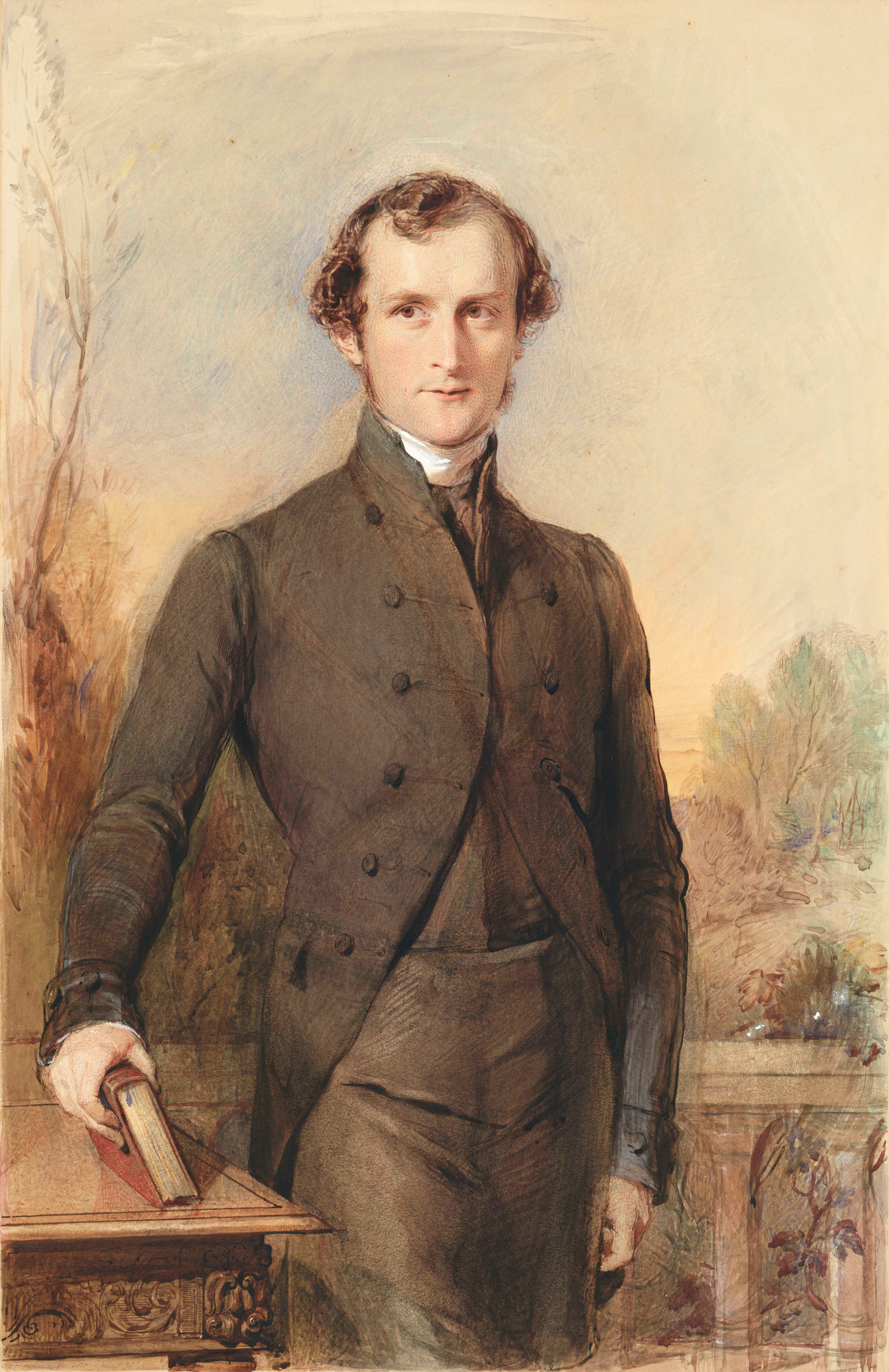
George Selwyn as a young man

After graduating from Cambridge, Selwyn worked at Eton College, becoming assistant master and tutoring the sons of Edward Herbert, 2nd Earl of Powis. In 1833 he was ordained deacon, and in 1834, a priest; he acted as curate to Isaac Gosset, the vicar of St John's, Windsor from 1833 until 1841. Both at Eton and at Windsor, Selwyn displayed much organising talent. In 1841, after an episcopal council held at Lambeth had recommended the appointment of a bishop for New Zealand, Charles James Blomfield, Bishop of London, offered the post to Selwyn.

== Bishop in New Zealand ==
Consecrated at Lambeth on 17 October 1841, Bishop Selwyn embarked for his new missionary diocese on 26 December. He appointed William Charles Cotton as his chaplain. The 23-member missionary party set sail from Plymouth late in December 1841 on board the barque Tomatin. In addition to their luggage, the missionaries brought various animals and four hives of bees. On the outbound voyage, Selwyn studied the Māori language with the help of a Māori boy returning from England and was able to preach in that language immediately on his arrival. He also acquired enough seamanship to enable him to be his own sailing master among the dangerous waters of the Pacific. In April 1842 the Tomatin arrived in Sydney.

The boat hit a rock on landing and, rather than wait for its repair, some of the party, including Selwyn and Cotton, set sail for New Zealand on the brig Bristolian on 19 May. They arrived in Auckland on 30 May. After spending some time as guests of Captain William Hobson, the first Governor of New Zealand, Selwyn and Cotton set sail on 6 June on the schooner Wave to visit the mission stations on the Hauraki Gulf, then north to the Bay of Islands. where he arrived on 20 June. Among the party was a clerk, William Bambridge, who was also an accomplished artist and was later to become photographer to Queen Victoria.

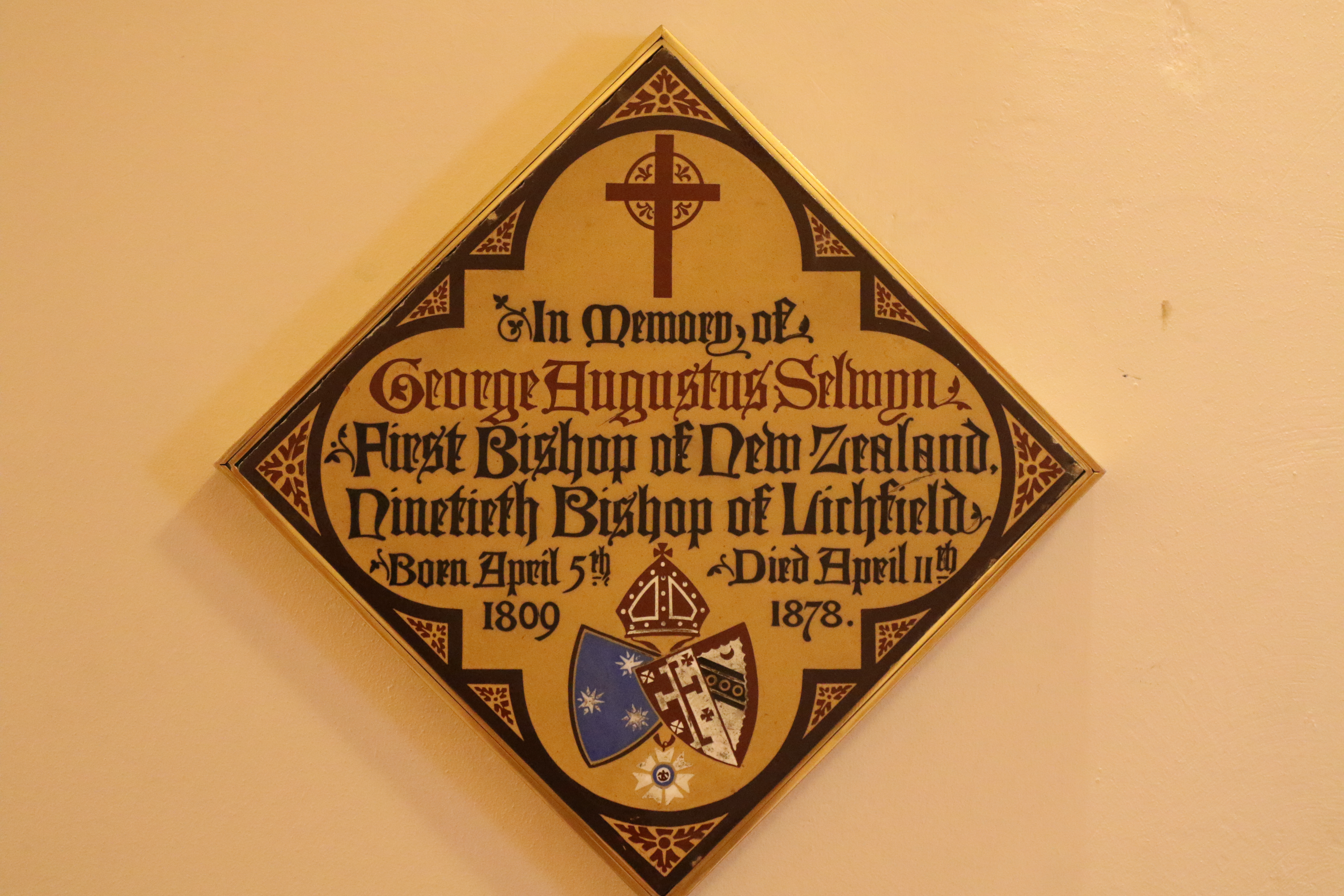
Memorial in Wellington Cathedral of St Paul

In June 1842, Selwyn set up residence at Te Waimate mission, some 15 miles (24 km) inland from Paihia where the Church Missionary Society (CMS) had established a settlement 11 years earlier.

Some buildings at Waimate were converted for use by the College of St John the Evangelist, to teach theology to candidates for ordination. On 5 July 1842 Selwyn set out on a six-month tour of his diocese leaving the Mission Station in the care of Sarah, his wife, and Cotton. In November, Selwyn travelled on the brig Victoria down the west coast of the North Island to visit Octavius Hadfield at the Ōtaki mission and the mission at Whanganui; then up the east coast to visit William Williams. By October 1843, more missionaries had arrived at Waimate, and Selwyn, accompanied by Cotton, embarked on his second tour, this time to mission stations and native settlements in the southern part of North Island. Their journey was made partly by canoe but mainly by walking, often for large distances over difficult and dangerous terrain. Part way through the tour Selwyn decided to split the party into two sections with one section led by himself and the other by Cotton. After being away for nearly three months, Cotton arrived back at Waimate early in 1844 and Selwyn returned a few weeks later.

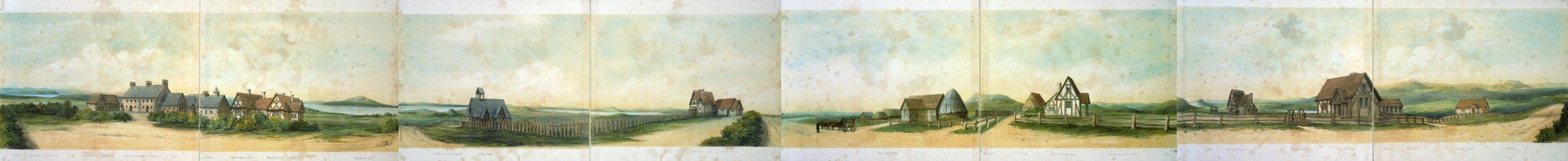
Panorama of St John's College and additional buildings in eastern Auckland, painted by Caroline Abraham, c. 1862

Later in 1844 Selwyn decided to move some 160 miles (257 km) south to West Tamaki near Auckland where he bought 450 acres (180 ha) of land, giving it the name of Bishop's Auckland. The party left on 23 October and arrived in Auckland on 17 November. The staff and students lived in huts at the head of the Purewa Creek which served as the port while the college was constructed upstream. The first buildings were built of scoria, with the kitchen / dining hall erected in 1846, but additional buildings were constructed in wood. The Collegiate Chapel was consecrated in 1847. During the first six months of 1845 Selwyn was away for much of the time and management of the settlement, and particularly the schools, fell to Cotton.

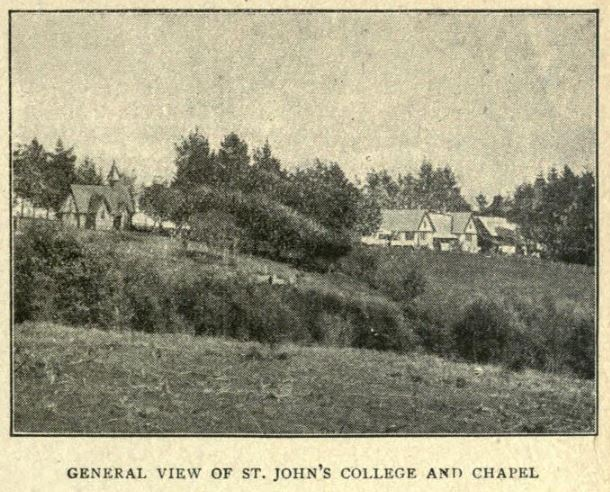
St John's College and Chapel, Auckland, c. 1910

The Bishop of New Zealand's seat was St Paul's Church, Auckland which served as Auckland's Cathedral for over 40 years, including the whole 28 years Selwyn had the role.

Selwyn clashed with Archdeacon Henry Williams, the leader of the CMS in New Zealand, when he supported Governor George Grey's accusations of improper land purchases by Williams. Grey twice failed to recover the land in the Supreme Court, and when Williams refused to give up the land unless the charges were retracted, he was dismissed from the CMS in November 1849. However Selwyn later regretted the position he had taken and in 1854 Williams was reinstated to the CMS after the bishop lobbied for his return to membership. The CMS missionaries held the low church beliefs that were common among Evangelical members of the Anglican Church. There was often a wide gap between the views of the CMS missionaries and the bishops and other clergy of the high church traditions of the Oxford Movement (also known as the Tractarians) as to the proper form of ritual and religious practice. Selwyn held high church (Tractarian) views although he appointed CMS missionaries to positions in the Anglican Church of New Zealand including appointing William Williams as the first Bishop of Waiapu.

Bishop Selwyn's see was an early foundation in the series of colonial sees organised by the English church, and his organisation and government of his diocese proved of special importance. In six years he completed a thorough visitation of the whole of New Zealand, and in December 1847 began a series of voyages to the Pacific Islands, which were included in his diocese by a clerical error in his letters patent. His see should have been defined as lying between 34th and 50th degrees of south latitude. The clerk drafted the boundaries as lying between 34th degrees of north latitude and 50th degrees of south latitude, which included islands to the north of New Zealand. At the time of his appointment, Selwyn was aware of this clerical error, but he chose not to point out the error.

His letters and journals descriptive of these journeyings through Melanesia present the reader with a vivid picture of his versatility, courage, and energy. In 1850 he formed the Australasian Board of Missions which led to the Melanesian Mission in the Western Pacific. His voyages and the administrative work described below resulted in 1861 in the consecration of John Coleridge Patteson as the first Bishop of Melanesia.

Selwyn elaborated a scheme for the self-government of his diocese. In 1854 he visited England to secure authorisation to subdivide his diocese, as well as permission for the church of New Zealand to manage its own affairs by a "general synod" of bishops, presbyters, and laity. His addresses before the University of Cambridge produced a great impression. On his return to New Zealand four bishops were consecrated, two to the North Island and two to the South Island, and the legal constitution of the church was finally established. His diocese having been subdivided, letters patent were issued (dated 27 September 1858) appointing Selwyn metropolitan bishop over all the dioceses of New Zealand. The first general synod was held in 1859. Selwyn's constitution of the Anglican Church of New Zealand greatly influenced the development of the colonial church. By the time of the 1858 revision of the General Synod's constitution, his role as metropolitan had come to be called "the Primate"; that title was added to the constitution at that synod and remains today.

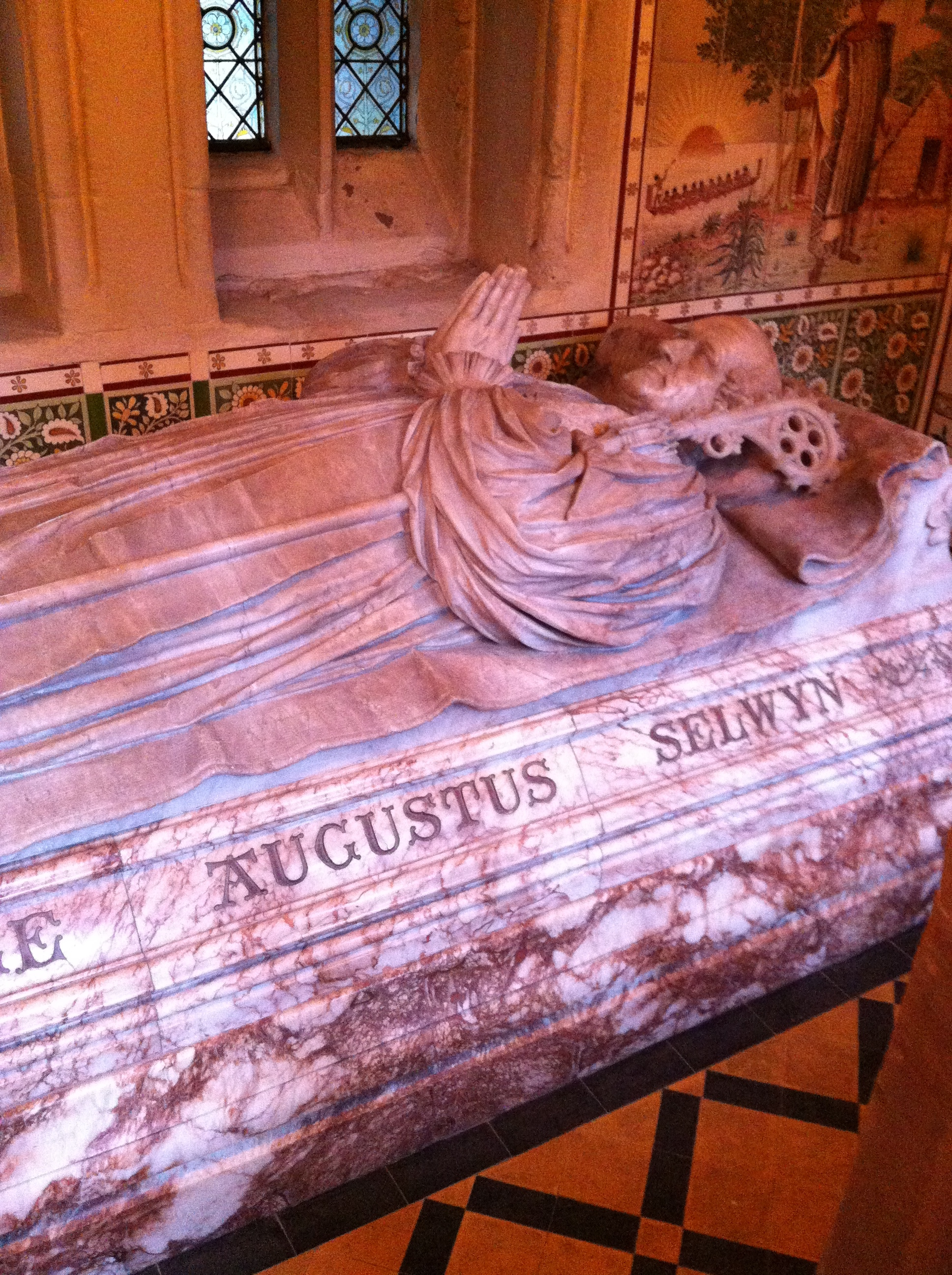
Memorial to Selwyn in Lichfield Cathedral

Selwyn was criticised by missioners in New Zealand like Thomas Grace, and by the CMS in London, including Henry Venn, for being ineffective in training and ordaining New Zealand teachers, deacons and priests – especially Māori. The CMS had funded half of his role on the condition that he ordain as many people as possible, but Selwyn slowed this down by insisting those in training learn Greek and Latin first. It would be 11 years until the first Māori deacon, Rota Waitoa, would be ordained by the Bishop at St Paul's, Auckland, and 24 years before he ordained a Māori priest. Selwyn was blamed for undermining the work of the CMS and damaging the enthusiasm Māori had for Christianity.

Selwyn generally advocated for Māori rights and was often a critic of the unjust and reckless land acquisition practices that led to the New Zealand Wars. In April 1860, following a land dispute in Taranaki, Selwyn wrote to Henry Tancred, acting Colonial Secretary, protesting how premature the Government had been in declaring martial law against Te Ati Awa, claiming this tribe had been 'faithful and efficient allies of the Government'. In the letter he further held that military action should not have been engaged in before exploring 'civil power' to resolve the dispute, called for a full scale investigation and concluded that Māori deserved the government's 'respect and gratitude...[instead of]...bullets'. However his support of the Invasion of the Waikato, where, as chaplain, he was frequently seen riding on horseback on the frontlines with the British and colonial forces, damaged his and the church's relationship with Māori, which is still felt today. After an engagement which resulted in the deaths of women and children in a burning whare at Rangiaowhia on 21 February 1864, it was charged that the bishop had treacherously misled them into believing the village was a safe haven. Other stories claimed that Selwyn assisted in the massacre and blessed the troops involved. A pamphlet, Ngā minita i roto i te whawhai (The ministers involved in the war), contains Māori testimony which exonerates Selwyn and confirms his presence on the fateful day at Te Awamutu, where he rendered assistance to Māori casualties from nearby Hairini. His acute sense of duty, and his desire to bring compassion to both sides, blinded him to the ambiguity of his presence with the military. He was pained by these charges, and by the damage done to the standing of the church among Māori. One historian has concluded that Selwyn "never recovered the trust he had earlier enjoyed".

== Final years ==
In 1867, Selwyn visited England a second time to participate at the first Pan-Anglican synod of the Lambeth Conference, an institution which his own work had done much to bring about. While in England Selwyn accepted, with much reluctance, the offer of the see of Lichfield.

Selwyn's election as the ninety-first Bishop of Lichfield was confirmed at St Mary-le-Bow on 4 January and he was enthroned at Lichfield Cathedral on 9 January 1868. Later that year, he paid a farewell visit to New Zealand and resigned that See (and the Primacy with it) on (or slightly before) 20 May 1869.

He governed Lichfield until his death, aged 69, on 11 April 1878. Earlier that year, Bishop Selwyn had ordained a class of deacons, one of whom, John Roberts, is known for his missionary work in the Bahamas and Wyoming. Selwyn died at the Bishop's Palace, Lichfield, and was buried in the grounds of Lichfield Cathedral.

== Legacy ==
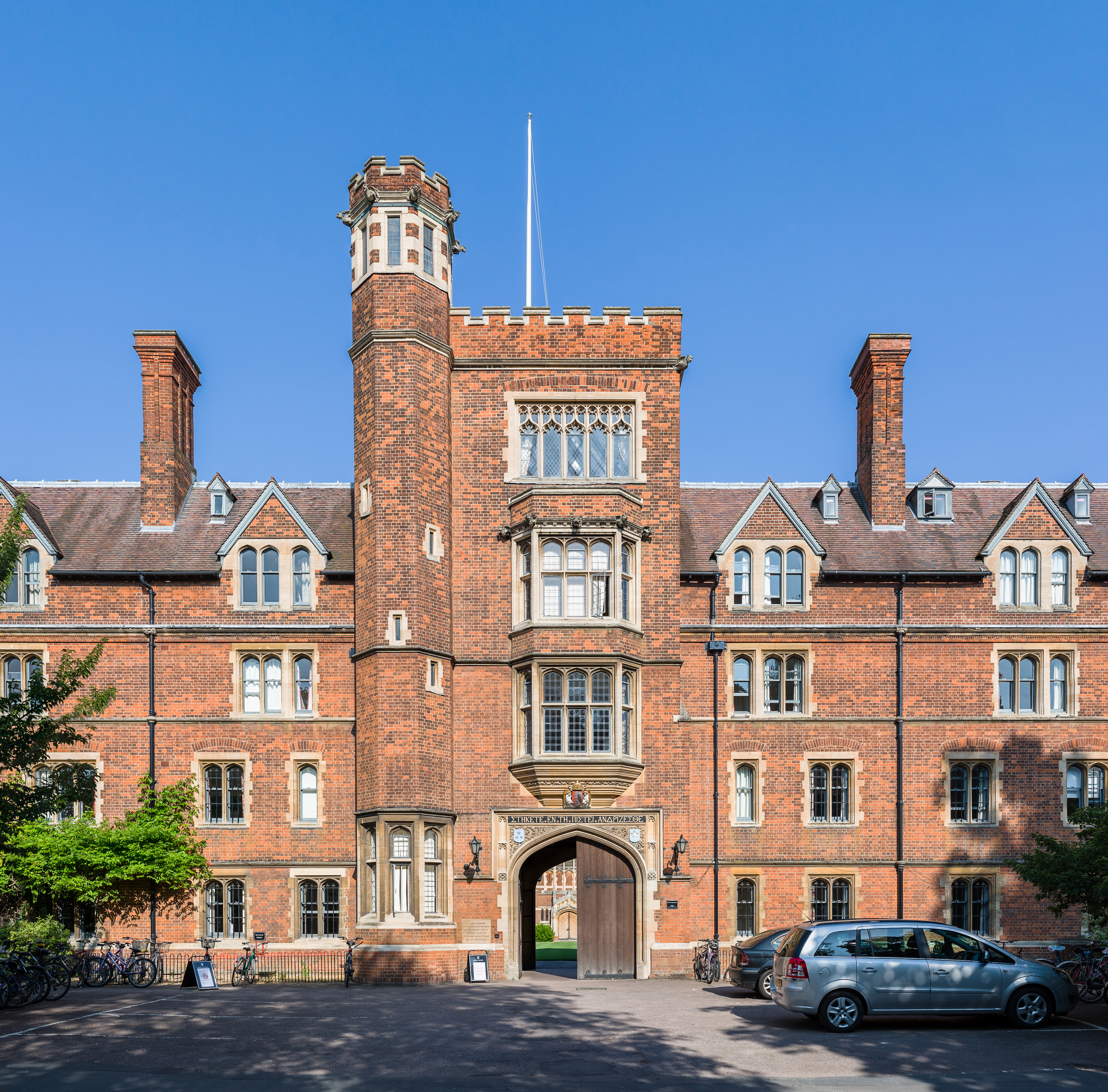
Selwyn College, Cambridge

After his death, Selwyn College, Cambridge was founded to honour his contributions and life. Several other smaller educational facilities were also established, including Selwyn College, Otago (1893), Selwyn College, Auckland (1956) Selwyn College Honiara, Solomon Islands (1971) and Selwyn houses at King's School and King's College in Auckland, Wellesley College, Wellington and Wanganui Collegiate School in New Zealand. Denstone College near Uttoxeter named one of its school houses Selwyn in his honour. The Selwyn Memorial Committee was founded in Spring 1878.

The college's first Master, Arthur Lyttelton, was elected on 10 March 1879, the Archbishop of Canterbury Archibald Tait was invited to become Visitor on 28 June 1878, and the college's founders purchased a six-acre (24,000 m^{2}) farm land site between Grange Road, West Road and Sidgwick Avenue on 3 November 1879 at a cost of £6,111 9s 7d and the building of Old Court, as it is now known, began in 1880. The foundation stone of the college was laid by Edward Herbert, 3rd Earl of Powis in a ceremony on 1 June 1881. A Charter of Incorporation was granted by Queen Victoria on 13 September 1882, and the west range of Old Court was ready for use by the college's official opening (with the Master's installation) on 10 October 1882. Selwyn's first 28 undergraduates joined the original Master and twelve other Fellows at the then Public Hostel of the university in 1882. It became an Approved Foundation of the university in 1926, and was granted full collegiate status on 14 March 1958.

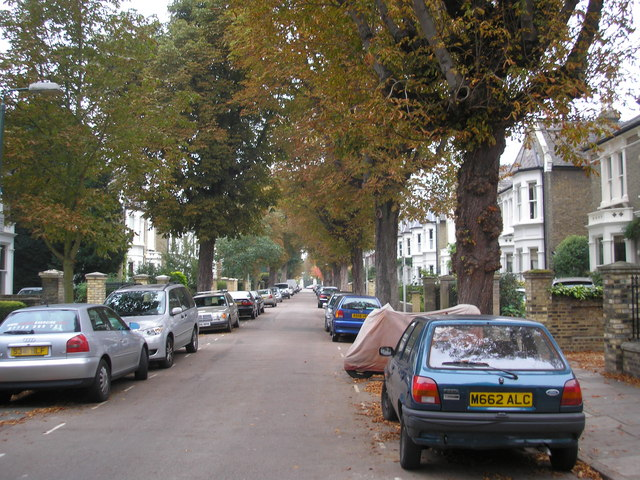
Lichfield Road, Kew

The college was founded with an explicitly Christian mission. Membership was initially restricted to baptised Christians. The foundation charter specified that the college should "make provision for those who intend to serve as missionaries overseas and... educate the sons of clergymen". The chapel was built in 1895 before the dining hall (in 1909), as it was deemed to be more important, and Chapel attendance was compulsory for students from the college's foundation until 1935. The college's coat of arms incorporates the arms of the Selwyn family impaled with a version of the arms of the Diocese of Lichfield.

A portrait of the bishop by George Richmond belongs to St John's College, Cambridge.

The Selwyn family owned a large tract of land in Kew, Surrey, and a road built on it, leading from Kew Gardens station to Kew Gardens, was named Lichfield Road after the bishop.

Selwyn is honoured on the calendars of the Church of England and the Episcopal Church (United States) on 11 April.

The Selwyn River / Waikirikiri in the Canterbury Region of New Zealand is named in his honour, as are the associated Selwyn District (through which it runs) and settlement of Selwyn. In 1905, Selwyn Road in Epsom, Auckland was named in his honour.

== Personal life ==
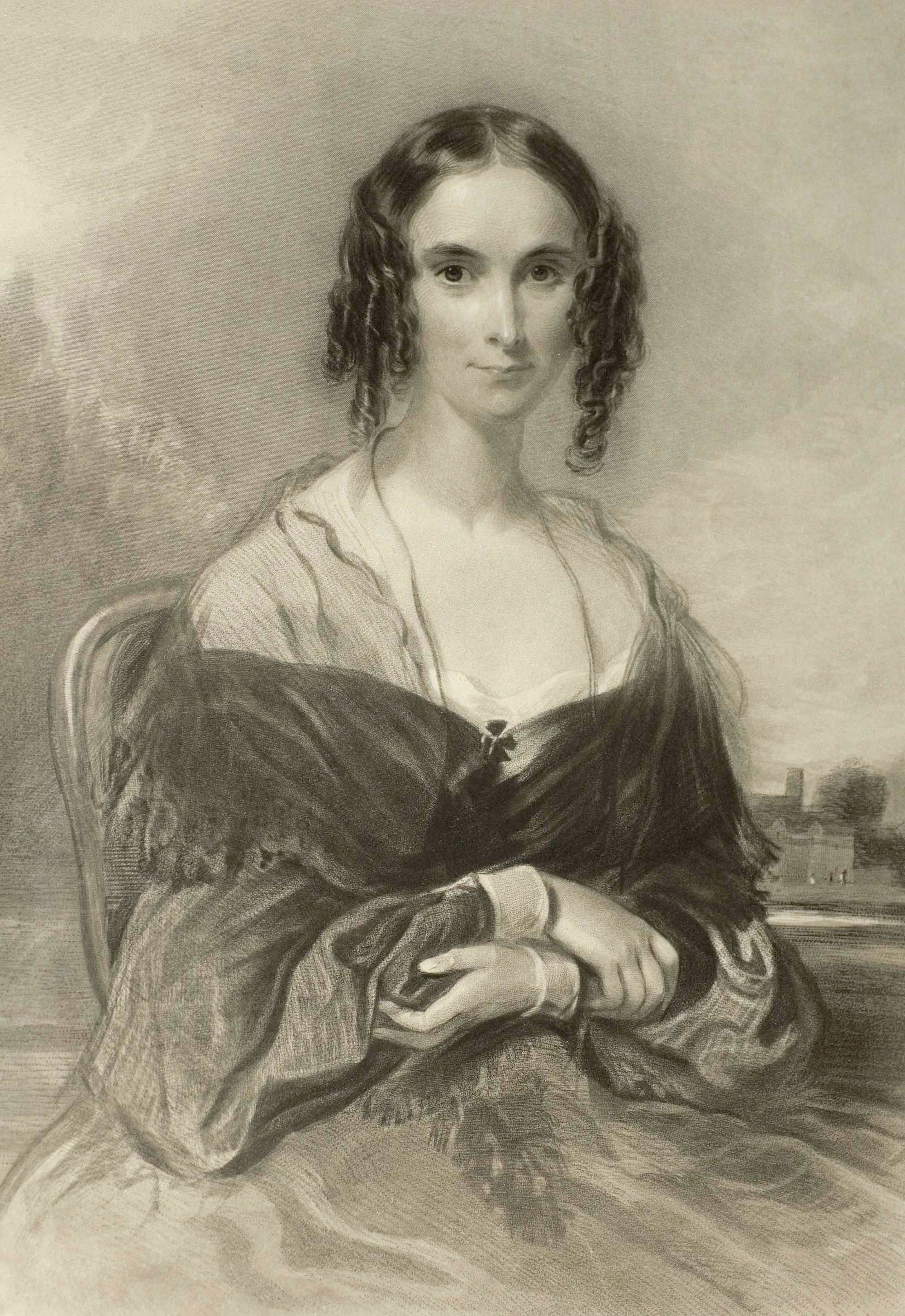
Sarah Harriet Selwyn, née Richardson

Selwyn married Sarah Harriet Richardson, the only daughter of John Richardson on 25 June 1839. They had two sons, William, prebendary of Hereford, and John Richardson Selwyn, Bishop of Melanesia. John Selwyn later became the second Master of Selwyn College, Cambridge.

Selwyn was brother of Charles Jasper Selwyn, and of William Selwyn (1806–1875).

== Writings ==
Page from a notebook containing grammatical notes on the dialects of New Caledonia, New Hebrides and other Melanesian Islands, and sketch maps and pencil sketches of the islands

Besides numerous sermons, letters, and charges, Selwyn was the author of:

- Are Cathedral Institutions useless? A Practical Answer to this Question, addressed to W. E. Gladstone, Esq., M.P., 1838; written in answer to an inquiry from Gladstone.
- Sermons preached chiefly in the Church of St John the Baptist, New Windsor, privately circulated, 1842.
- Letters to the Society for the Propagation of the Gospel from the Bishop of New Zealand, with extracts from his Visitation Journals; printed in the society's series entitled Church in the Colonies, Nos. 4, 7, 8, 12 and 20.
- Verbal Analysis of the Holy Bible, intended to facilitate the Translation of the Holy Scriptures into Foreign Languages, 1855.

His papers for the period 1831–72 are stored in the archives of Selwyn College, Cambridge.

== See also ==
- List of Cambridge University Boat Race crews
- Saints in Anglicanism
- Selwyn churches

== Notes ==
Anglican Communion titles
New title	Bishop of New Zealand; 1841–1869	Succeeded by William Cowie as Bishop of Auckland
New title	Metropolitan/Primate of New Zealand; 1858–1868	Succeeded by Henry Harper
Church of England titles
Preceded by John Lonsdale	Bishop of Lichfield; 1868–1878	Succeeded by William Dalrymple Maclagan
