= St John's Theological College, Auckland =

St John's Theological College
- Māori: Hoani Tapu te Kaikauwhau i te Rongopai
- Anglican theological college
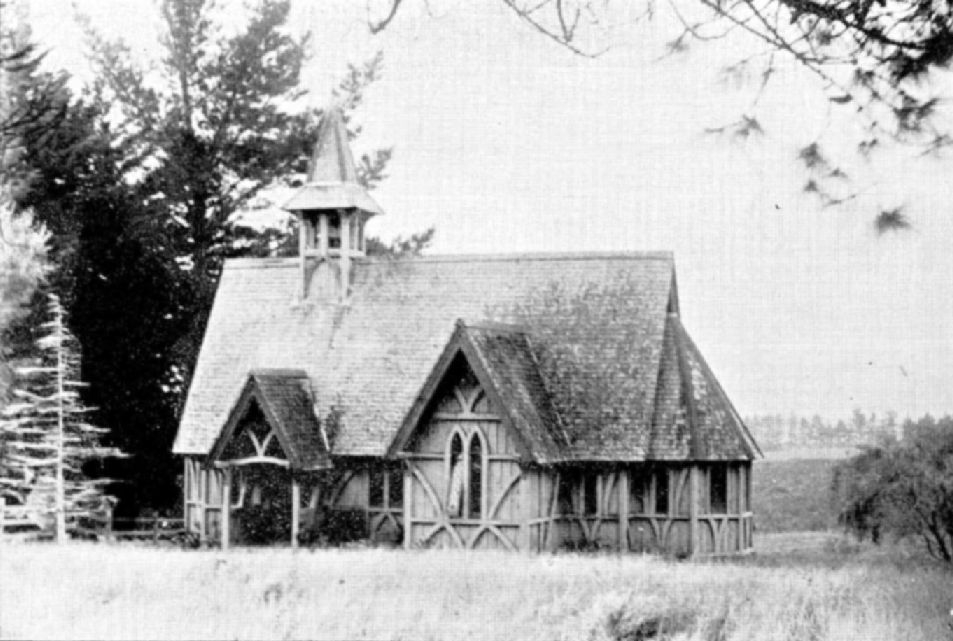
- St John's College Chapel, c. 1900
- Location: Meadowbank, Auckland, New Zealand
- Coordinates: 36°52′25″S 174°50′27″E
- Full name: College of St John the Evangelist
- Motto: Māori: Te Whakamana i ngā Kairui
- Motto in English: Enabling Missional Leaders
- Established: 1843; 183 years ago
- Principal: Ven. Dr. Hirini Kaa
- Benefactor: Anglican Church in Aotearoa, New Zealand and Polynesia
- Endowment: NZ$470 million
- Website: www.stjohnscollege.ac.nz

The College of St John the Evangelist or St John's Theological College (Māori Hoani Tapu) is the residential theological college of the Anglican Church in Aotearoa, New Zealand and Polynesia.

The site at Meadowbank in Auckland is the base for theological education for the three Tikanga of the province with ministry formation onsite as well as diploma level teaching in the regions across New Zealand and Polynesia. The college has partnerships with various other tertiary providers of degrees in theology.

The college was established in 1843 by George Augustus Selwyn, Bishop of New Zealand, initially at Te Waimate mission.

The College, through the St John's College Trust Board, is one of the best endowed theological colleges in the Anglican Communion, with assets in 2014 of NZ$293m. It was subject to a critical review of its financial sustainability in 2014.

== Theological activities ==
It taught the Licentiate in Theology (LTh) for the Joint Board of Theological Studies from 1968. Later it offered Melbourne College of Divinity degrees, primarily the BD. From 1993 it offered the University of Auckland BTheol.

Undergraduate ordinands study a NZ Diploma in Christian Studies and then undertake the remaining years of their theology degree at Laidlaw College, Carey Baptist College or the University of Otago. Other lay and ordained persons around NZ study the NZ Diploma in Christian Studies regionally (through weekend intensives) and by FlexiLearn (a distance learning programme with live online classes).

It previously had an on-site ecumenical partnership with Trinity Methodist Theological College, the theological college of the Methodist Church of New Zealand, but now has only Anglican students.

The John Kinder Theological Library Te Puna Atuatanga is the library and archives for the college as well as for the Anglican Church in Aotearoa New Zealand and Polynesia. Although based on the St John's College site, it also has responsibilities to the whole Church and all its theological educational enterprises. It is named after John Kinder, a former principal of the college.

== Notable alumni and alumnae ==
- Frank Buckland (1847–1915), MP and mayor
- Thomas Frederic Cheeseman, notable English born botanist and naturalist
- Julian Dobbs, bishop of the Anglican Diocese of the Living Word in the United States
- Mary Gray-Reeves, bishop of the Episcopal Diocese of El Camino Real in California, US
- Hone Kaa (1941-2012)
- Trevor Ogilvie-Grant, 4th Baron Strathspey (1879–1948), member of the House of Lords
- Edward Osborne-Gibbes, (1850–1931) — a baronet, former Secretary of the New Zealand Education Department and the architect of that country's modern public education system
- Harry Wollaston KCMG ISO, (1846–1921), Comptroller-General of Customs in Australia

== Gallery ==
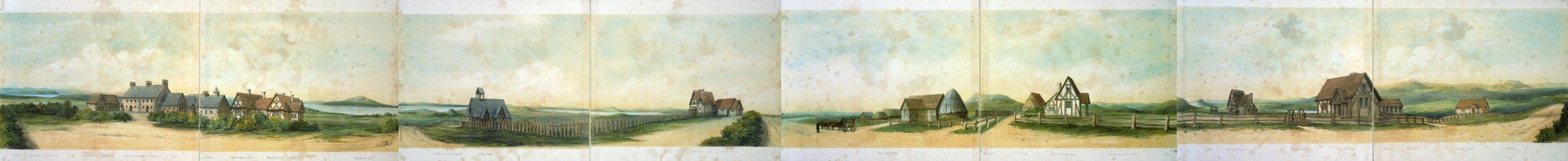
Panorama of St John's college Tamaki Auckland St John's College 1862 by Caroline Harriet Abraham

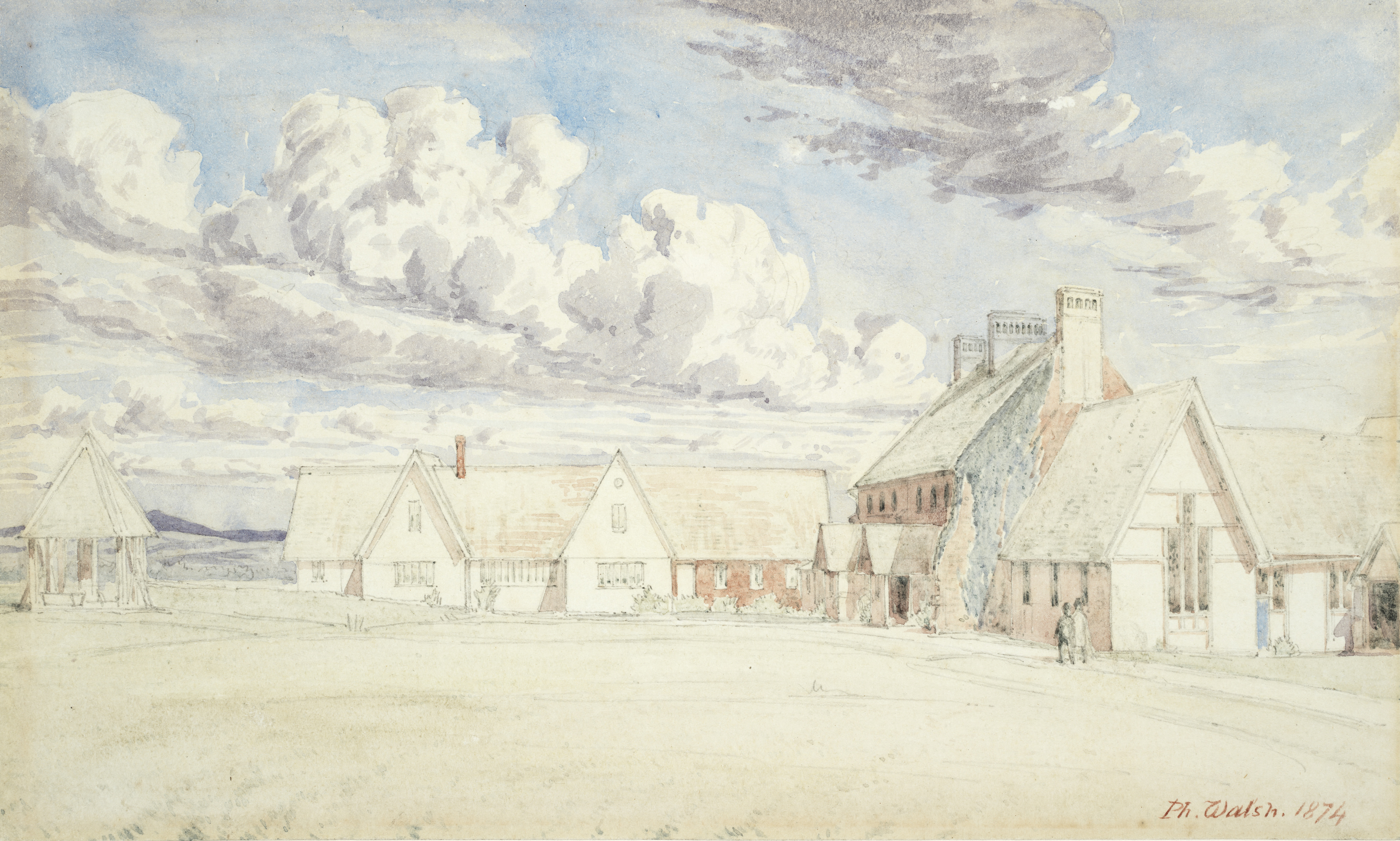
1874 painting by Philip Walsh of St John's College

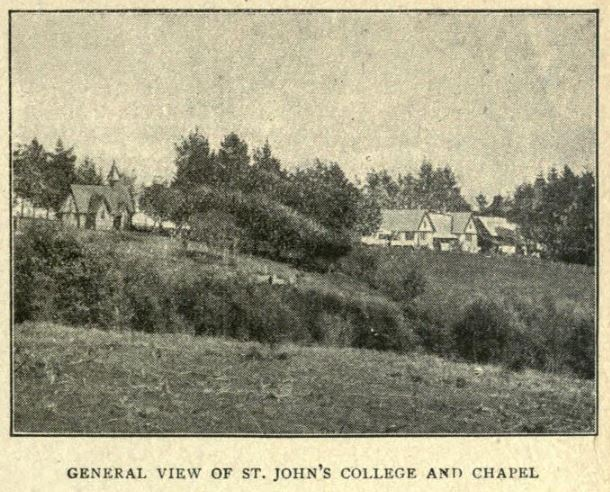
St. John's College and Chapel, Auckland c. 1911
