= Wanlip =

Village in Leicestershire, England

Coordinates: 52.691°N 1.115°W

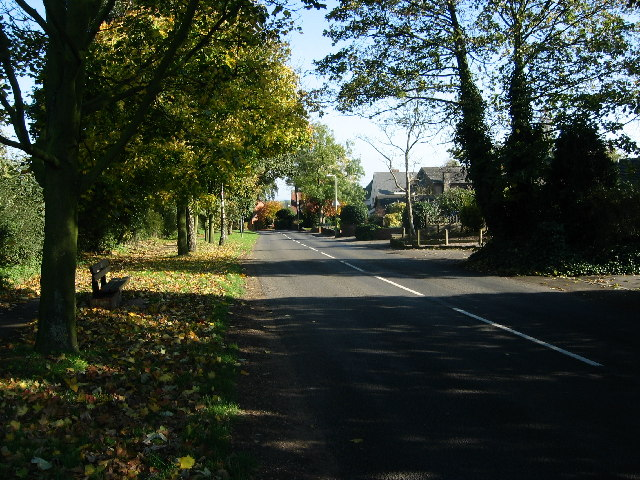
- Rectory Road, Wanlip

- Location within Leicestershire
- Population: 305 (2011)
- OS grid reference: SK5910
- Civil parish: Wanlip
- District: Charnwood
- Shire county: Leicestershire
- Region: East Midlands
- Country: England
- Sovereign state: United Kingdom
- Post town: LEICESTER
- Postcode district: LE7
- Dialling code: 0116
- Police: Leicestershire
- Fire: Leicestershire
- Ambulance: East Midlands
- UK Parliament: Mid Leicestershire

Wanlip is a small village and civil parish in the Charnwood district of Leicestershire, with a population measured at 305 at the 2011 census. It is a countryside village, north of Birstall, and west of Watermead Country Park and the River Soar. The A46 road runs directly past the village. Wanlip won the 2008 Leicester and Rutland Best Village Competition for villages with a population under 500.

To the south of Wanlip is Wanlip Meadows, a Leicestershire and Rutland Wildlife Trust nature reserve. To the north is a Severn Trent sewage treatment plant, serving a population of more than half a million. The Cedars Academy lies to the south at the edge of Birstall. To the east lies the 14 hectare Reedbed Local Nature Reserve, part of the Watermead Country Park.

Wanlip is the site of a 132-metre-high wind turbine which went into operation at the end of 2013.

== History ==
Mountsorrel he mounted at,

Rodely he rode by,
Onelep he leaped o'er,
At Birstall he burst his gall,

At Belgrave he was buried at.

Folk rhyme about a giant called Bell who boasted that he could reach Leicester in three leaps,
mentioning Wanlip as Onelep, a pun on "One Leap".

An Iron Age settlement was unearthed just to the north of Wanlip and an Anglo-Saxon cemetery was discovered during the building of Longslade School in 1958,

One of the earliest mentions of Wanlip is in Domesday Book, where it is listed as Anelepe, among the lands given to Earl Aubrey by the King. The land described includes a mill. The Earl's son Aubrey de Vere II went on to become Lord Chancellor.

The surnames of the three families who have owned the manor over eight centuries are:

- Walsh 1230-1526
- Aston 1526-1626
- Palmer 1626-today

William Wilberforce, the 19th century MP and leading abolitionist, lived for some years at Wanlip Hall.

There are four listed buildings in Wanlip: a brick ice house, the church of Our Lady and St. Nicholas, Manor Farm and Hall Farm.

== Church of Our Lady & St Nicholas ==
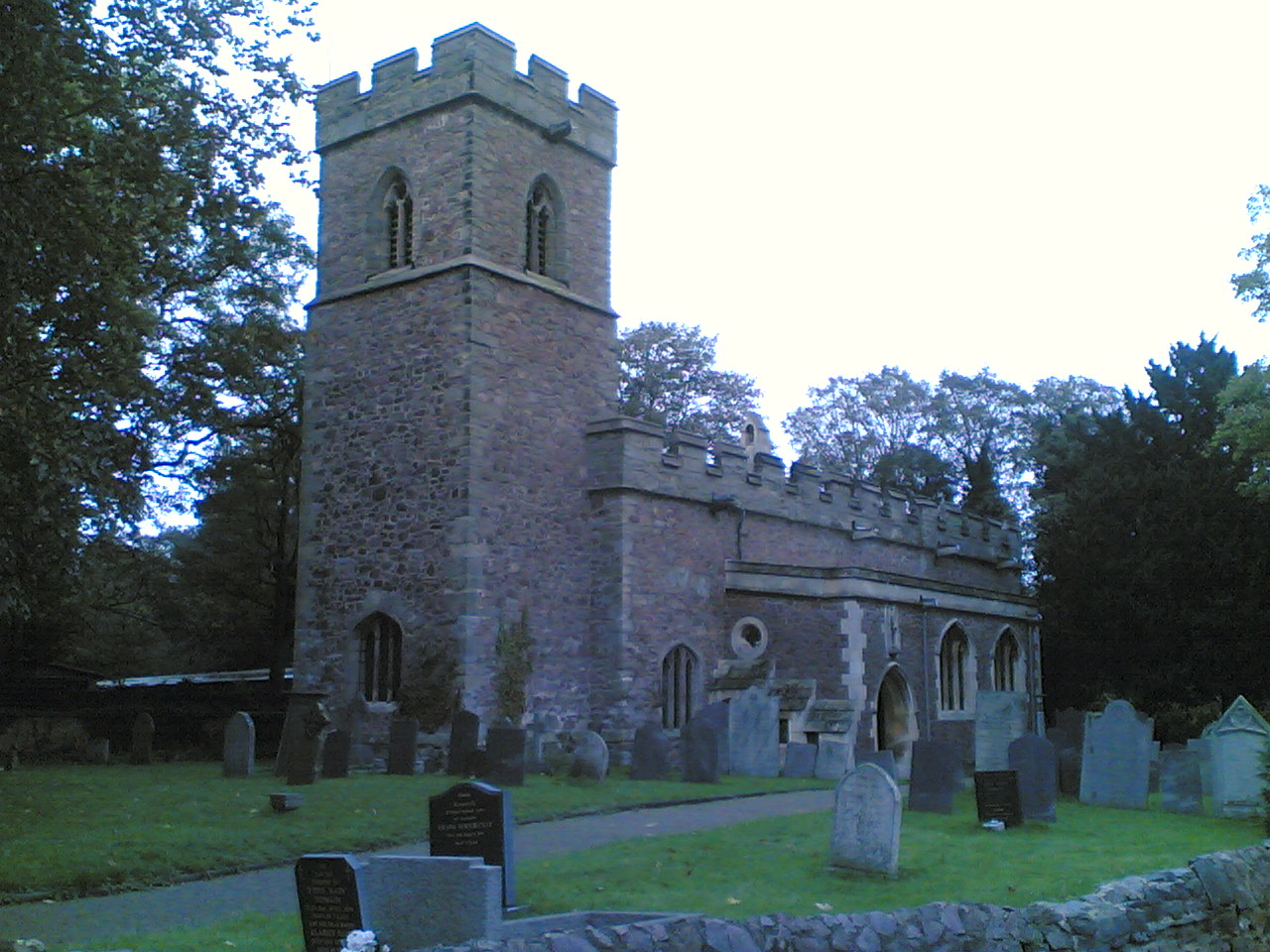
Our Lady & St. Nicholas Church

Much of the structure of this parish church was erected in the 13th and 14th centuries but there have been a variety of later alterations, including changes made in the 19th century and the south aisle which was built in 1904. The walls are constructed mainly of granite rubble with ashlar dressing. It is a Grade II listed building.

The chancel floor is notable for housing the brass that commemorates Sir Thomas Walsh and his wife Katherine. This comprises the figures of the couple with a border that is the earliest surviving example of an English inscription for a high-status tomb monument. The inscription reads:

“Here lyes Thomas Walssh knyght lorde of Anlep and dame Katine his wife whiche in her tyme made the kirke of Anlep and halud the kirkyerd first in Wurchip of god and of oure lady and seynt Nicholas that god have her soules and mercy anno domini millesimo CCC nonagesimo tercio [i.e. 1393].”

The memorial is the subject of a detailed article by Nigel Saul, who commented that the church is a distinguished building incorporating motifs from the state apartments at Kenilworth Castle that had been commissioned by John of Gaunt, with whom Sir Thomas Walsh was closely connected.

In the churchyard is a substantial headstone with the following epitaph: "Sacred to the memory of Rasselas Morjan, who was born at Macadi on the confines of Abyssinia and died at Wanlip Hall August 25th 1839 in the 19th year of his age. Rescued from a state of slavery in this life and enabled by God's grace to become a member of his Church he rests here in the hope of a greater deliverance hereafter. This stone is raised in remembrance of his blameless life by one whom he loved."

== Palmer family ==
Wanlip is said to be unusual because in 1906 the land there was all owned by just one family - the Palmers.

The Baronetcy at Wanlip has been held by the (later named Palmer) family since 1791 when it was awarded to Charles Grave Hudson. Notable members of the family include the artist Caroline Harriet Abraham and her father Charles Thomas Hudson Palmer, 2nd Baronet.

Charles Palmer-Tomkinson, father of socialite Tara Palmer-Tomkinson, is a landowner in Wanlip and Birstall, responsible for the Hallam Fields development in next-door Birstall.

The current holder of the baronetcy is Sir John Edward Somerset Palmer, 8th baronet.
