= Southern Cross (1891 Melanesian Mission ship) =

1891 Melanesian Mission ship

Coordinates: 40.14°S 143.87°E

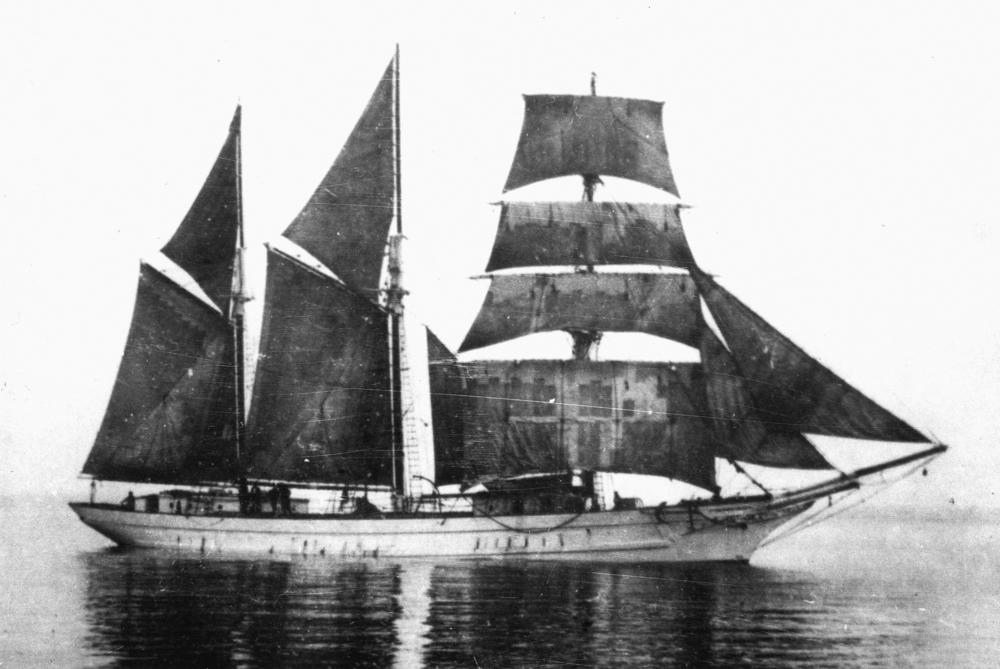

History
- Name: Southern Cross
- Operator: Melanesian Mission
- Builder: Forrestt & Sons, Wivenhoe
- Yard number: 100
- Completed: 1891
- Fate: Wrecked in Bass Strait, September 1920

General characteristics
- Tons burthen: 257 tons Old Measurement
- Length: 131 ft 4 in (40.03 m)
- Beam: 26 ft 0 in (7.92 m)
- Draught: 14 ft 2 in (4.32 m)
- Installed power: engine (prior to 1902)
- Propulsion: sail & steam (prior to 1902)
- Sail plan: Three-Mast Schooner, changed to Brigantine

Southern Cross was a three-masted auxiliary barquentine built in 1891 for the Melanesian Mission of the Anglican Church and the Church of the Province of Melanesia, and was lost with all hands off King Island, Tasmania in 1920.

== Design and construction ==
Southern Cross was built at Wivenhoe, Essex, England, by Forrest & Sons in 1891 as an barquentine-rigged yacht, with auxiliary steam power.

Built for service with the Melanesian Mission of the Anglican Church with funds estimated at £9,000 contributed by Bishop John Richardson Selwyn and others. Originally built as a steam yacht, she underwent conversion to a barquentine rig several years later.

== Career ==
On her maiden voyage, she was extensively damaged by a storm in the English Channel during October 1891. After repair, she left in early November and arrived in Auckland on 12 March 1892.

She was in service with the Melanesian Mission from 1892 to 1902. The engines were removed in 1904 prior to her sale.

== Final voyage ==
On 11 September 1920, Southern Cross sailed from Melbourne for Hobart with a general cargo including 1,000 cases of benzine stored on its main deck. On 22 September, a large quantity of wreckage was found on the north coast of King Island. Further searches found wreckage around the island with a concentration at the southern end. As the wreckage bore traces of burning, it was speculated that the ship's deck cargo had caught fire, or that it had struck a mine laid by the German raider Wolff in 1917.

The following personnel were reportedly lost in the wrecking - Frank Rule Hodgman, master; T. Watts, mate; C.F. Makepeace, boatswain; D. Dinehy, able seaman; W. O'Connell, able seaman; L. Sward, able seaman; W. Moody, able seaman; Wm. Brown, cook & steward and Stanley Bell, cabin boy.

== See also ==
- Southern Cross (Melanesian Mission ship series)
