= Clement Marau =

Melanesian Anglican clergyman

Clement Marau (c. 1857–1926, alt. Maraw, Marow) was a Melanesian Anglican clergyman. He was made a deacon by Bishop John Richardson Selwyn in 1890, and ordained to the priesthood in 1903 by Bishop Cecil Wilson. Born on Merelava in the Banks Islands, he was taken to Norfolk Island for Christian education and ministerial training. He worked as a teacher and pastor in the Solomon Islands. Marau was removed from his clerical office following a 1907 charge of adultery, but restored in 1918 by Bishop Cecil Wood.

He is commemorated on July 20 on the Calendar of saints (Church of the Province of Melanesia).
