= Merivale Molyneux =

British Anglican bishop

- Bishop of Melanesia
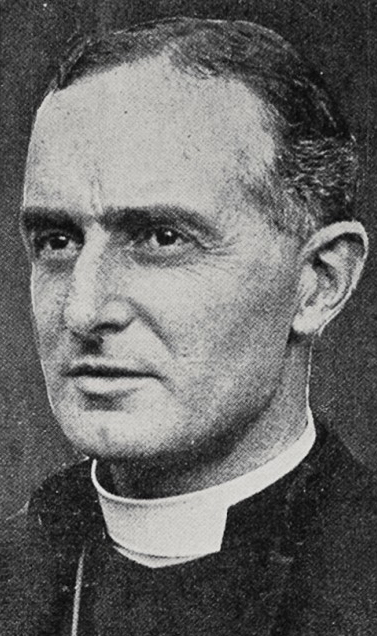
- Diocese: Diocese of Melanesia
- In office: 1928–1931
- Predecessor: John Steward
- Successor: Walter Baddeley
- Other post: Assistant Bishop of Melanesia (1924–1928)

Orders
- Ordination: 1909 (deacon); 1911 (priest) by William Boyd Carpenter
- Consecration: 9 August 1925 by Alfred Averill

Personal details
- Born: 10 May 1885 Bransgore, Hampshire, UK
- Died: 20 November 1948 (aged 63) Royal Victoria Hospital, Boscombe
- Buried: Bransgore, Hampshire, UK
- Denomination: Anglican
- Parents: Frederick (a priest)
- Education: Keble College, Oxford

Frederick Merivale Molyneux (called Merivale; 10 May 1885 – 20 November 1948) was a British Anglican bishop who served as Bishop of Melanesia.

== Family and education ==
Born at Bransgore, Molyneux was the son of Rosa and Frederick Molyneux (a priest) and grandson of lawyer Echlin Molyneux; he was younger brother to Ernest, also a priest, who served as his commissary in Britain (1928–1932). Merivale was educated at Rossall School, and Keble College, Oxford (he graduated Bachelor of Arts {BA} in 1908 and proceeded Master of Arts (Oxford) {MA Oxon} in 1913), and trained for the ministry at Cuddesdon College.

== Early ministry ==
He was made deacon at Advent 1909 (18 December) and ordained priest at Lent 1911 (12 March) — both times by William Boyd Carpenter, Bishop of Ripon, at Ripon Cathedral. His title (curacy) was of All Souls' Leeds, until 1913, when he returned to Cuddesdon as college Chaplain. During this time (the Great War), he was also a Chaplain to the Forces (CF) in Mesopotamia (1916–19): for which he was mentioned in despatches, made a Member of the Order of the British Empire (3 June 1918) and an honorary chaplain to the forces (Hon CF) in 1919. He had been in Mesopotamia for 3 years other than for 6 months leave in 1918 spent in Ceylon. He had spent much of his commission working in hospitals. He served as Vicar of High Wycombe from 1920.

== Melanesia ==
On 14 July 1924, the Melanesian Mission committee in England recommended Molyneux to the New Zealand bishops and John Steward, Bishop of Melanesia, for appointment as an assistant bishop of that diocese; by April 1925, when Thomas Strong, Bishop of Oxford, presented him with a crozier at High Wycombe, that recommendation had been accepted, and he was duly consecrated a bishop on 9 August 1925 by Alfred Averill, Archbishop of New Zealand in St Paul's Pro-Cathedral, Wellington. Molyneux then served as Assistant Bishop of Melanesia from 1925 to 1928: initially, he had responsibility for the Southern Archdeaconery (based in Lolowai, Aoba (now called Ambae), but lived primarily in the Banks Islands; however, as Steward's health declined, Molyneux increasingly assisted him throughout the diocese.

Steward having announced his imminent resignation (due to ill-health), on 13 June 1928 the diocesan synod unanimously chose to nominate Molyneux for the diocesan See; Steward having resigned effective 1 August, the New Zealand bishops elected Molyneux on 16 August, and he was enthroned at St Luke's Cathedral, Siota on 13 November. His assistant bishop Edward Wilton having resigned 1 July 1929, Molyneux he wrote to the Mission committee on 8 October 1930 to ask for a new assistant bishop; in 1931, John Dickinson became assistant bishop for the Southern area.

== Return to Britain ==
In the midst of allegations of "improper conduct with young men" and "concerns about erotic involvements with men", he experienced a "complete nervous breakdown", resigned his See in November 1931, and left the Solomon Islands. He arrived back in Britain in January 1932, where he retired to Hampshire — initially with his father at Martyr Worthy rectory. Cyril Garbett, Bishop of Winchester, declined to license the younger Molyneux to any ministry; he became a farmer. He died at the Royal Victoria Hospital, Boscombe and was buried at Bransgore.

Anglican Communion titles
Preceded by John Steward	Bishop of Melanesia; 1928–1931	Succeeded by Walter Baddeley
