= Norman Palmer (bishop) =

Norman Kitchener Palmer CMG MBE (2 October 1928 – 13 November 2008) was the eleventh Anglican Bishop of Melanesia and second Archbishop of the Province of Melanesia.

Palmer was educated at St John's College, Auckland and ordained in 1966. His first post was as an Assistant Master and Chaplain at All Hallows’ School, Pawa, Melanesia. He was then Priest/Headmaster at Alanguala Primary and then St Nicholas Primary. From 1973 to 1975 he was Dean of St Barnabas when he became Bishop of Central Melanesia and ex officio Archbishop of Melanesia, posts he held until 1987. He was consecrated a bishop on 1 November 1975 at the Cathedral Church of St Barnabas, Honiara.

Anglican Communion titles
Preceded by John Chisholm	Archbishop of Melanesia; 1975–1987	Succeeded by Amos Waiaru
