= Casper Uka =

Anglican bishop

Casper Uka, MBE was an Anglican bishop who served as Assistant Bishop of Melanesia from 1974 to 1980.

Uka was educated at St Peter's College, Siota. He was ordained deacon in 1962 and priest in 1964. He was consecrated Assistant Bishop of Melanesia at the Cathedral Church of St Barnabas, Honiara by John Chisholm, Archbishop of Melanesia on 8 November 1975.
