= Ellison Pogo =

Sir Ellison Leslie Pogo KBE (also Pogolamana; 1948 – 13 May 2013) was a Solomon Islands Anglican bishop. He was the Archbishop of Melanesia and Bishop of Central Melanesia from 1994 until December 9, 2008. He was the third Archbishop of Melanesia, following Amos Waiaru. He was married to Roslyn and had three adult children.

Pogo was educated at St John's College, Auckland and ordained in 1979. After an early post at Anderson's Bay, Dunedin he was Bishop of Ysabel in the Solomon Islands until his translation to Melanesia. He was installed as Archbishop of Melanesia on 17 April 1994.

Pogo was the senior primate of the Anglican Communion until his retirement and chairman of the design group of the 2008 Lambeth Conference, and Chairman of Pacific Theological College. He was also one of the few Anglican Primates to have been knighted by Elizabeth II, Queen of Solomon Islands. Rowan Williams, Archbishop of Canterbury awarded him the Cross of St Augustine in October 2008.
