= Cathedral Church of St Barnabas, Honiara =

Cathedral in the Solomon Islands

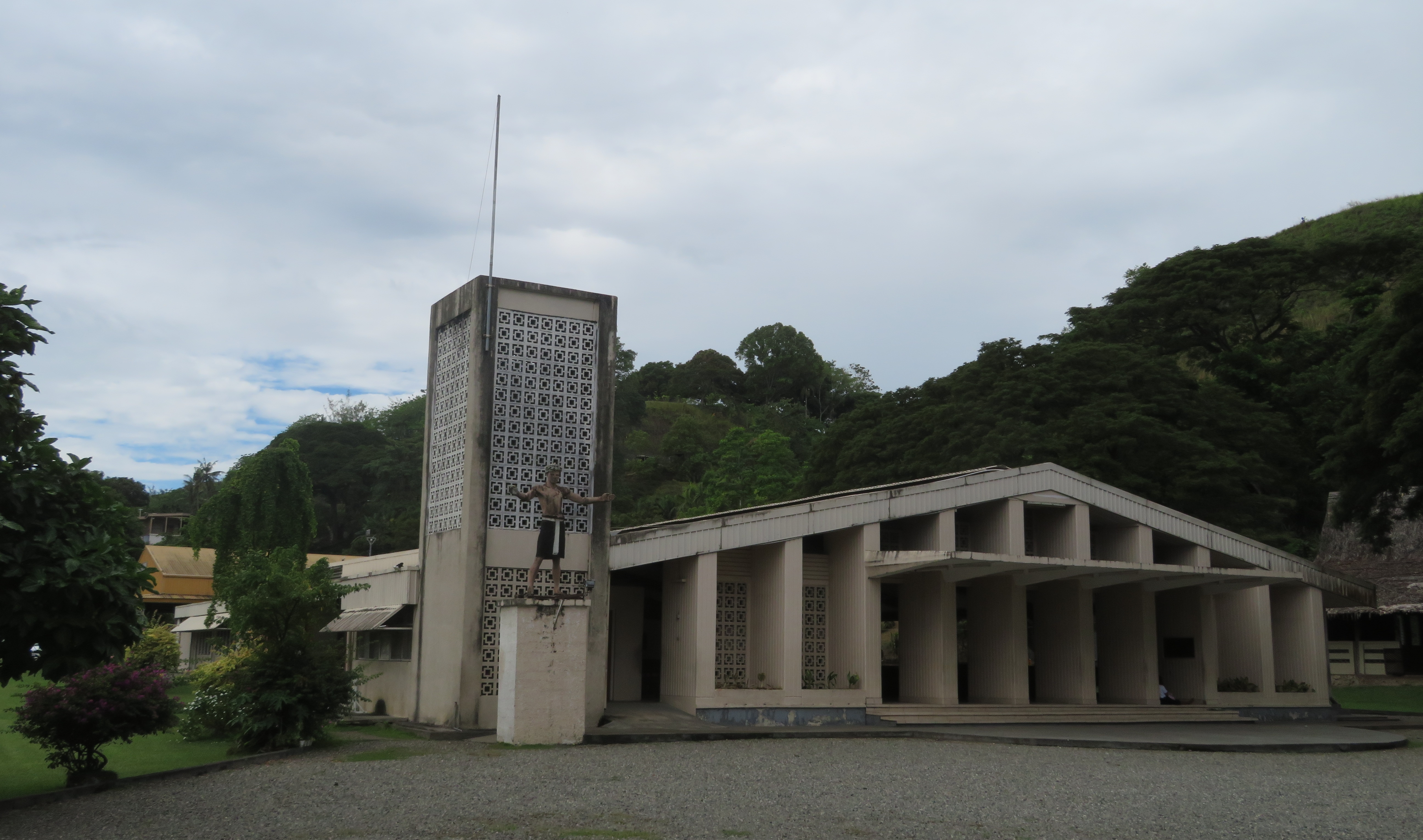
St. Barnabas Anglican Cathedral, Honiara, Solomon Islands

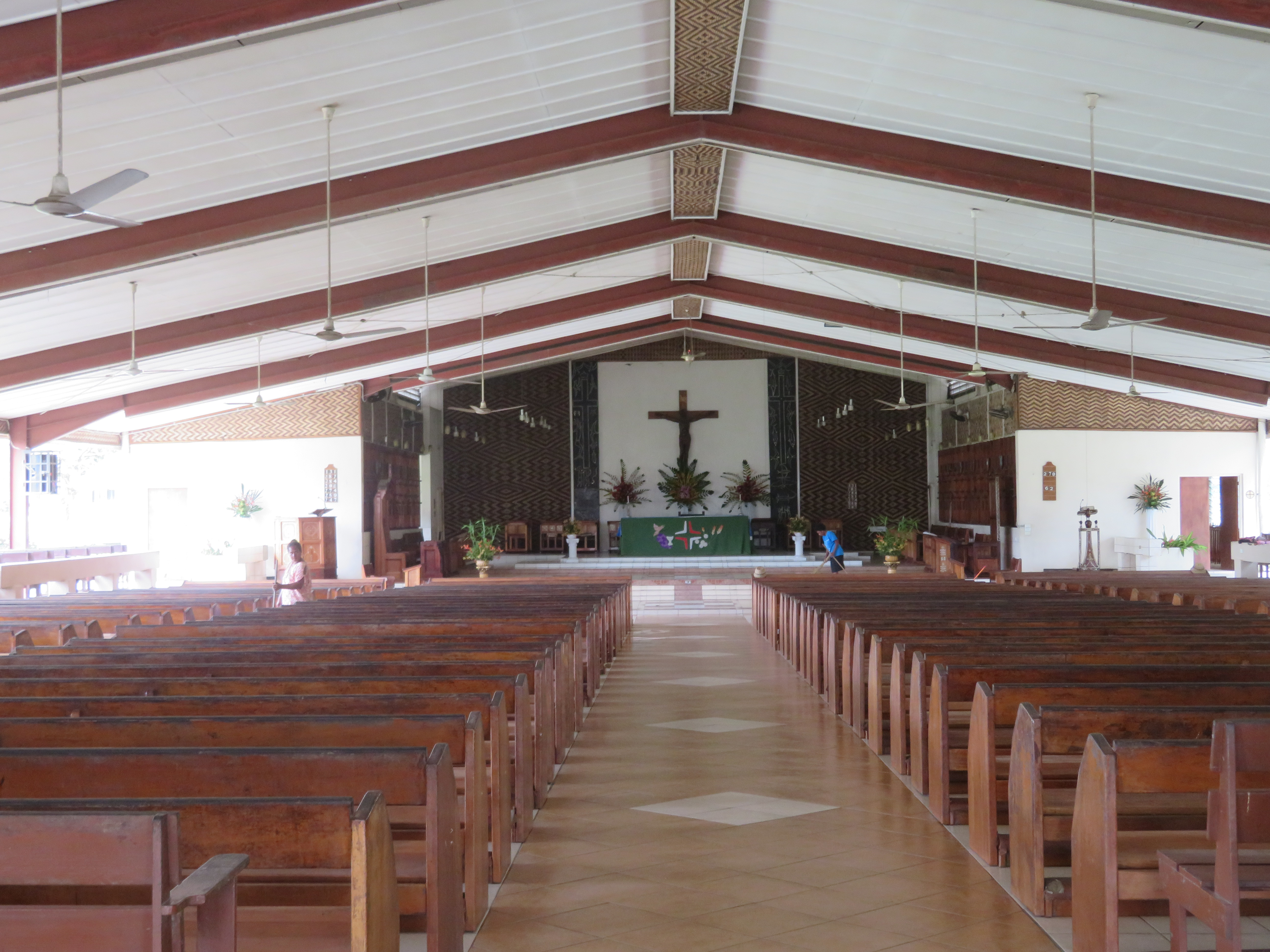
Interior of St.Barnabas Cathedral

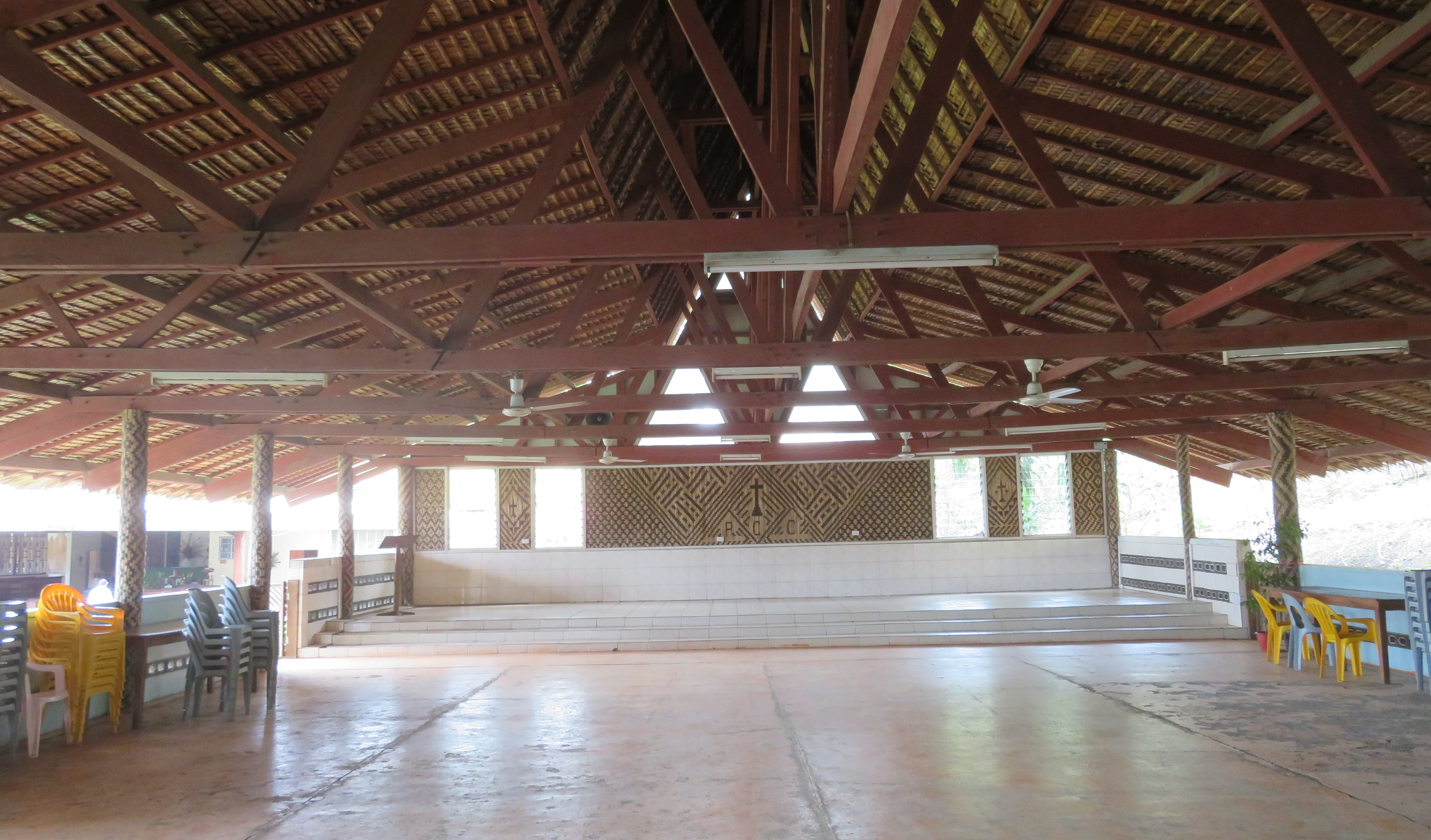
The Melanesia Haus

The St. Barnabas' Anglican Cathedral, Honiara is one of three Anglican cathedrals built in the Solomon Islands. The St. Luke's Cathedral was the first to be built in 1920s at Siota, Nggela but it was destroyed in World War II. The second was the All Saints Cathedral, a temporary structure built in the 1950s which was replaced by the St. Barnabas' Anglican Cathedral, Honiara, named after the St. Barnabas' Chapel and School on Norfolk Island, in the 1960s; the planning to build it started in 1961. The foundation stone for the new cathedral was laid on 6 January 1968 by Bishop Alfred Hill. A dedication service was held on 15 December 1968 which was attended by 1500 people. The cathedral was formally consecrated on 16 June 1969 when 2000 people attended the ceremony and it was dedicated by Bishops Chisholm and Alufurai.

== Features ==
The cathedral is built to a plan of 160 by 73 metres (525 by 240 ft) and is a steel framed structure of modern design. Its roof is made of aluminum sheets. It has a concrete floor and its interior furnishings are traditional Melanesian. It has a seating capacity for 900 people.

== Burials ==
A portion of the grounds was consecrated as a Cathedral garth for the burial of those who served the diocese over a long period. The body of the ninth Bishop, Alfred Thomas Hill was the first to be interred here on 1 September 1969. The cathedral also has a casket which contains the burial mat, baton and chalice of John Patteson, who was the first bishop of Melanesia; he had been killed on Nukapu Island in the Reef Islands in 1871.
