= Melanesian Mission House =

Educational building in Auckland, New Zealand

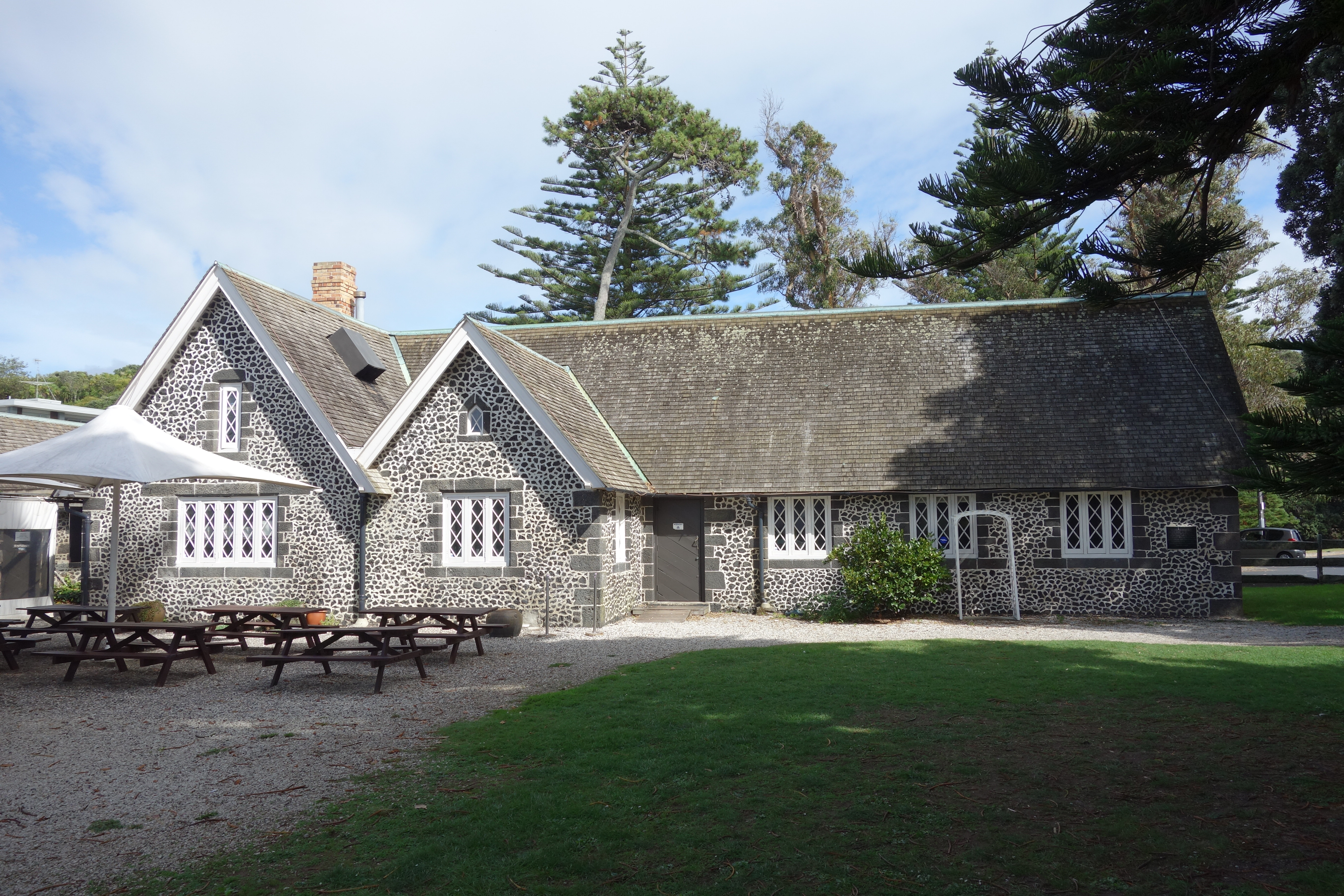
- The Melanesian Mission House
- Interactive map of the Melanesian Mission House area

General information
- Architectural style: Tudor Revival
- Location: 40–44 Tamaki Drive, Mission Bay, Auckland
- Named for: Melanesian Mission
- Year built: 1859
- Owner: Heritage New Zealand

Technical details
- Material: Basalt

Design and construction
- Architect: Reader Wood

Renovating team
- Architect: Jeremy Salmond

Heritage New Zealand – Category 1
- Designated: 6 June 1983
- Reference no.: 111

The Melanesian Mission House is a Tudor Revival former educational building located in Mission Bay, Auckland, New Zealand. Formerly owned by the Anglican Church of New Zealand it is now owned Heritage New Zealand and registered as a category 1 building.

Constructed from local basalt, the building was originally used as part of St Andrew's College, an Anglican school for Melanesians. Following the Melanesian Mission moving to Norfolk Island the building served as a naval school, industrial school, Anglican Sunday school and place of worship, flying school, and museum before being owned by the New Zealand Historic Places Trust. Heritage New Zealand currently lease the building as a restaurant.

== History ==
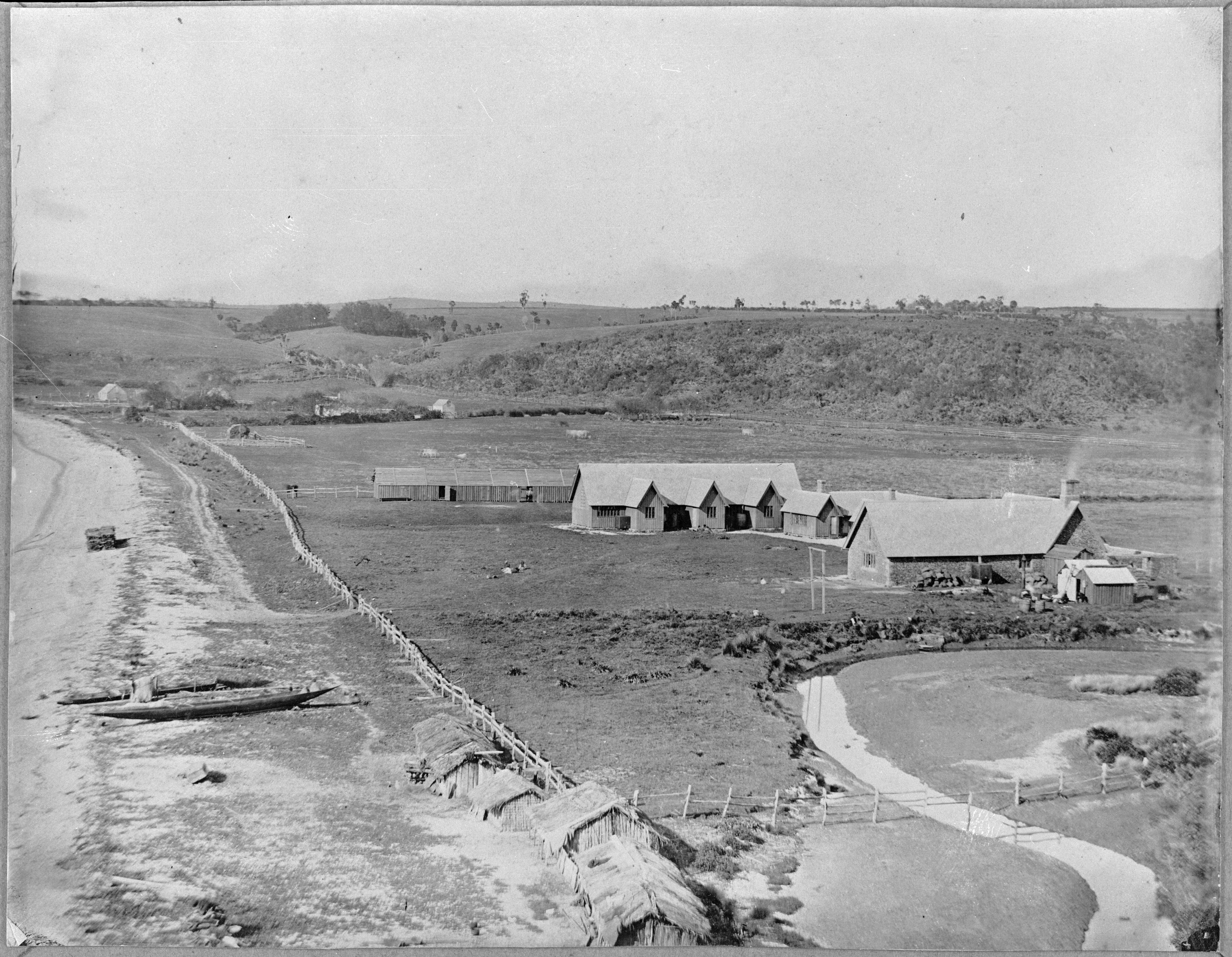
Mission Bay circa 1860

The land for the Melanesian Mission House was owned by George Augustus Selwyn the Anglican Bishop of New Zealand. Selwyn purchased 140 acres (57 ha) of farmland in the area in 1841. Unlike other land Selwyn had given to the church, he retained control of this land. In 1862 Selwyn and Patteson established a trust to manage the land, with rental income from the land being used to support missionary work in the Solomon Islands and New Hebrides

The Melanesian Mission House was constructed in 1859 as part of St Andrew's College, an Anglican school for Melanesians. With the purpose being to give Melanesian men an Anglican education before they return home. The mission also taught agriculture and industry to the Melanesians. The mission was established by the Reverend John Coleridge Patteson using land his father had donated and a gift of £400 from his cousin, Charlotte Yonge. Yonge used the proceeds from The Daisy Chain for the gift. The name St Andrew's came from a church in the novel. Upper-class residents of Auckland would visit the site and expressed admiration about both the work being done and the environment of the college. In 1860 the complex was used to host the Kohimarama conference, an attempt to reduce tensions between Maori and the Crown because of the First Taranaki War.

The building served as a dining hall, kitchen, and storeroom for the college. In 1861 the dining hall had a chimney added. The deaths of many Melanesians due to illness, which was blamed on the climate being too cold for them, and the cost of having to transport Melanesians to New Zealand and back. This led to the mission moving to Norfolk Island in 1867 following a grant of 1,000 acres (400 ha) by the Australian government. The school had grown to quite a large complex by this point. The new mission at Norfolk Island was designed in a similar style.

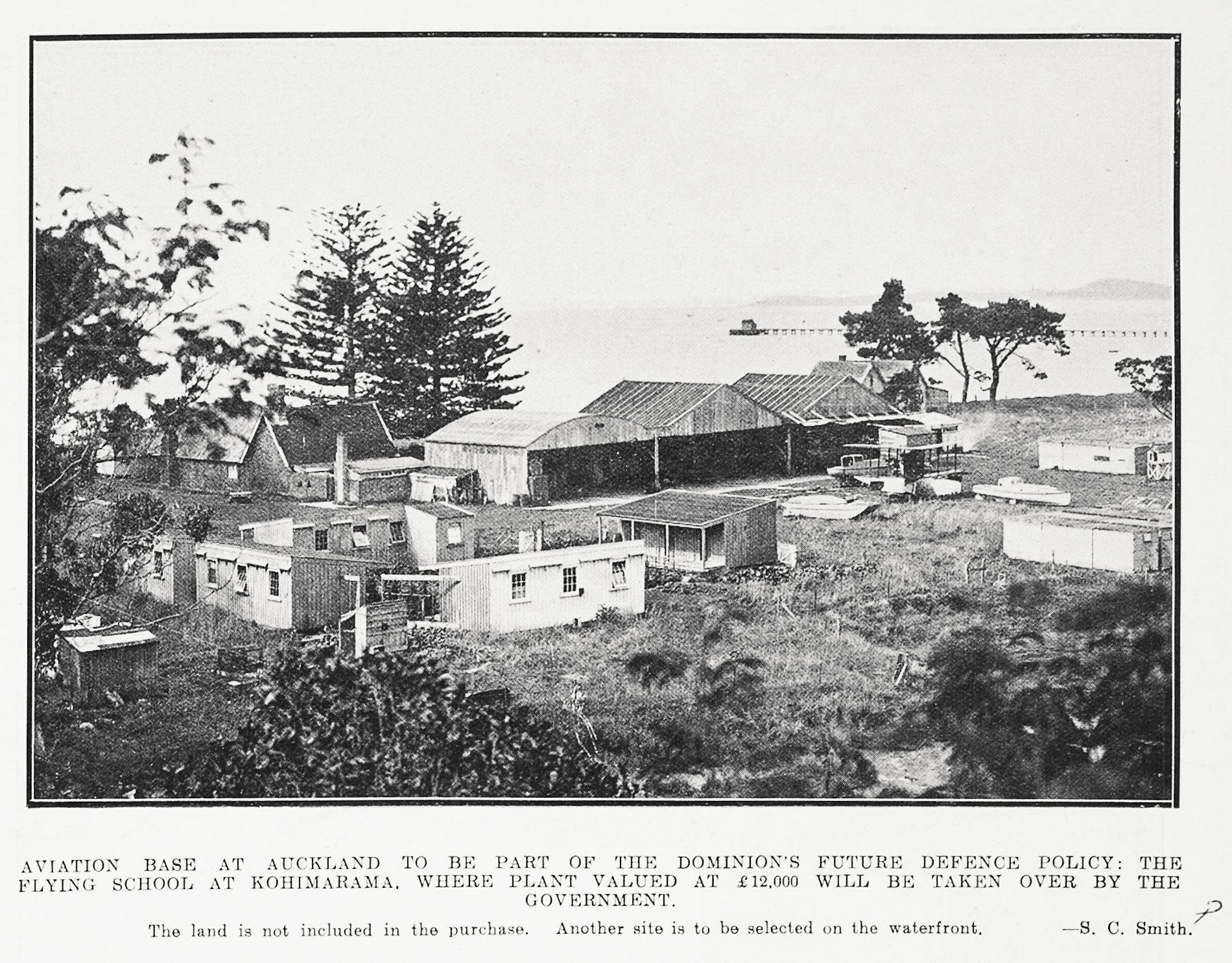
Aviation base in 1924

After the mission moved to Norfolk Island the property was leased with repairs made in 1874 to a roof. Later that year the government agreed to lease the complex at £100 per annum for a naval training school. In March 1882 the naval school became an industrial school. Both schools existed to serve neglected and delinquent boys. In 1893 the school closed. and later for Anglican services and Sunday school. From 1915 to 1924 it was used by the New Zealand Flying School to train pilots for World War One. In 1925 the land of the college was subdivided. 10 acres (4.0 ha) was set aside for the Selwyn Domain reserve. Over the years parts of the complex were demolished until only the Mission House remained by 1926.

In 1928, it opened as the Melanesian Mission Museum following a restoration which included the erection of an outbuilding and removal of parts of the walls. This work was overseen by Arthur J. Palmer, an architect who grew up on Norfolk Island, and whose father served at St Andrew's College. The museum housed artefacts from the South Sea Islands. In February 1929 it was officially opened by the Archbishop Alfred Averill. Shortly after this restoration work took place as the building had deteriorated. It cost at least 1,000 pounds. In 1935 the mortar was replaced with a cement mortar and the internal walls were plastered over with it. It became owned by New Zealand Historic Places Trust in 1974 after the museum planned to close and other plans for the building such as offices for the Melanesian Mission were unpopular. The Historic Places Trust intended to continue to use the property as a museum but were unable to control the humidity to provide appropriate conditions for the artefacts—the collection was later moved to Auckland Museum in 1979—the building then became an eatery and souvenir shop. In 1990 renovations were allowed by the Historic Places Trust to enable a restaurant to lease the facility. This involved the construction of another outbuilding. By 1996 the mortar had to be replaced again, this time a lime mortar was used due to the cement plaster causing moisture to build up in the walls.

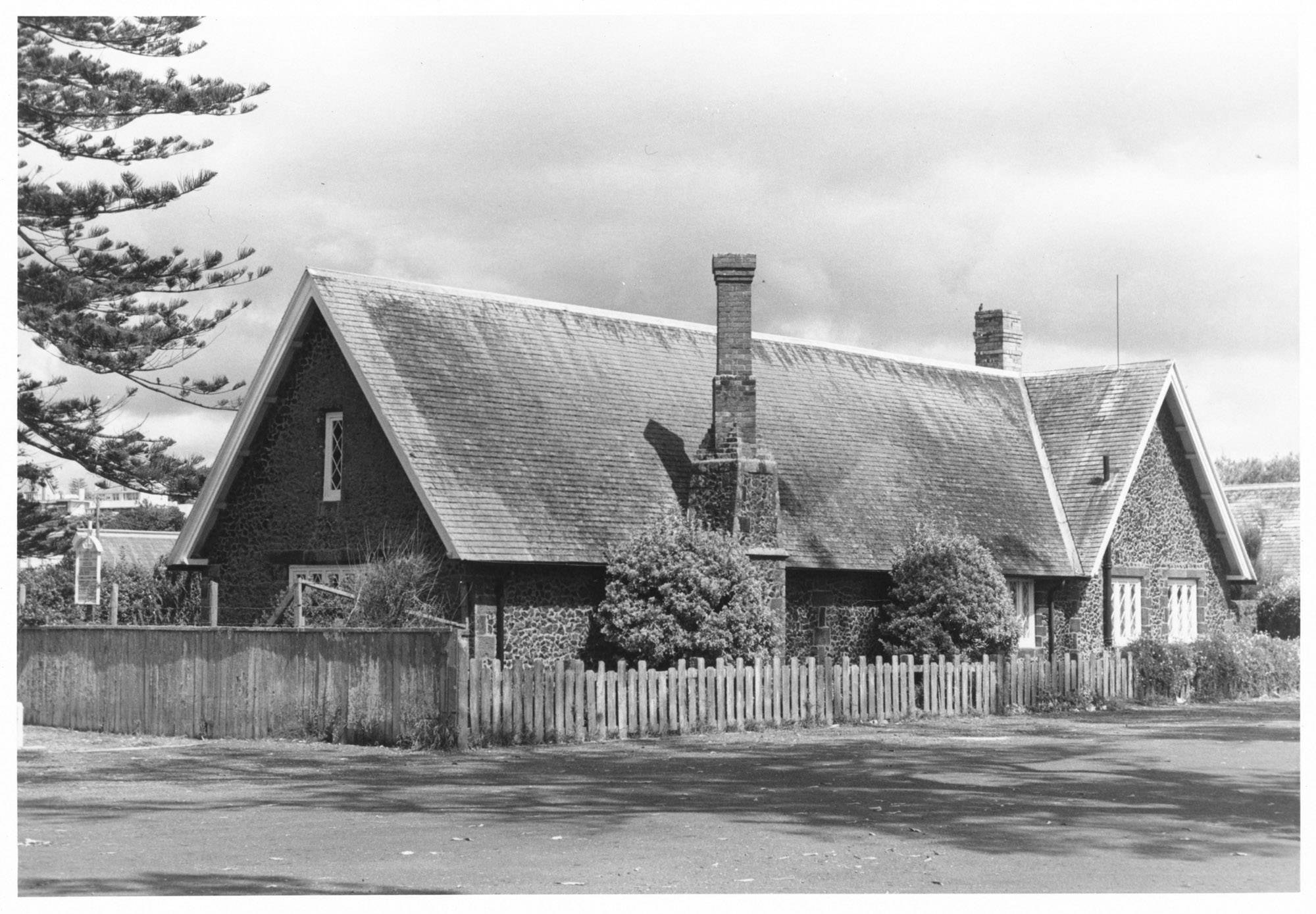
Melanesian Mission House 1963

In 2017 the building was reopened following a $3 million renovation which included the restoration of the Mission House and a new restaurant outbuilding. During the renovation works foundations of the older buildings and a drainage trench were uncovered. A lime-based grout was used to strengthen the building against earthquakes. The restaurant building was designed by Herbst Architects. The restoration work was overseen by architect Jeremy Salmond.

== Description ==
The Melanesian Mission House is an L-shaped building constructed from basalt held together with lime mortar. The basalt came from the nearby Rangitoto Island. Designed in a Tudor Revival style, its steep-pitched rooves and square-headed windows are reminiscent of educational buildings constructed during the late mediaeval and early modern periods in England—this period and its educational expansion are connected with the English Reformation. Patteson described the building to his cousin, Charlotte Yonge in a letter.

The west side consists of a very nice set of stone buildings, including a large kitchen, store room and room for putting things in daily, and immediate use; and the hall, which is the northern part of the side of the quadrangle, is a really a handsome room, with simple open roof and windows of a familiar collegiate appearance. These buildings are of the dark grey scoria, almost imperishable I suppose, and look very well. The hall is long just enough to take seven of us at the high table (so to speak), and thirtyfour at the long table stretching from the high table to the end of the room

Originally part of a wider 47 acres (19 ha) complex, the mission house is the only surviving building. The original complex included an 80 hectares (200 acres) farm.

The site also contains two protected Norfolk pine trees that were planted by Bishop George Augustus Selwyn and John Coleridge Patteson. Patteson described the site to Yonge in a letter written 21 December 1859.

Just opposite the entrance into the Auckland harbour, between the island of Eangitoto [sic] with its double peak and the easternmost point of the northern shore of the harbour, lies a very sheltered bay, with its sea-frontage of rather more than a quarter of a mile, bounded to the east, south, and west by low hills, which where they meet the sea become sandy cliffs, fringed with the red-flower-bearing pohutakawa. The whole of this bay, the seventy acres of flat rich soil included within the rising ground mentioned, and some seventy acres more as yet lying uncleared, adjoining the same block of seventy acres, and likely to be very valuable, as the land is capital—the whole of this was bought by the bishop Bishop many years ago as the property of the Mission, and is the only piece of Church land over which he retains the control, every other bequest or gift to the amount of 14,000 acres, having been handed over by him to the General Synod. This he retains till the state of the Melanesian Mission is more definitely settled
