= Southern Cross (Melanesian Mission ship series) =

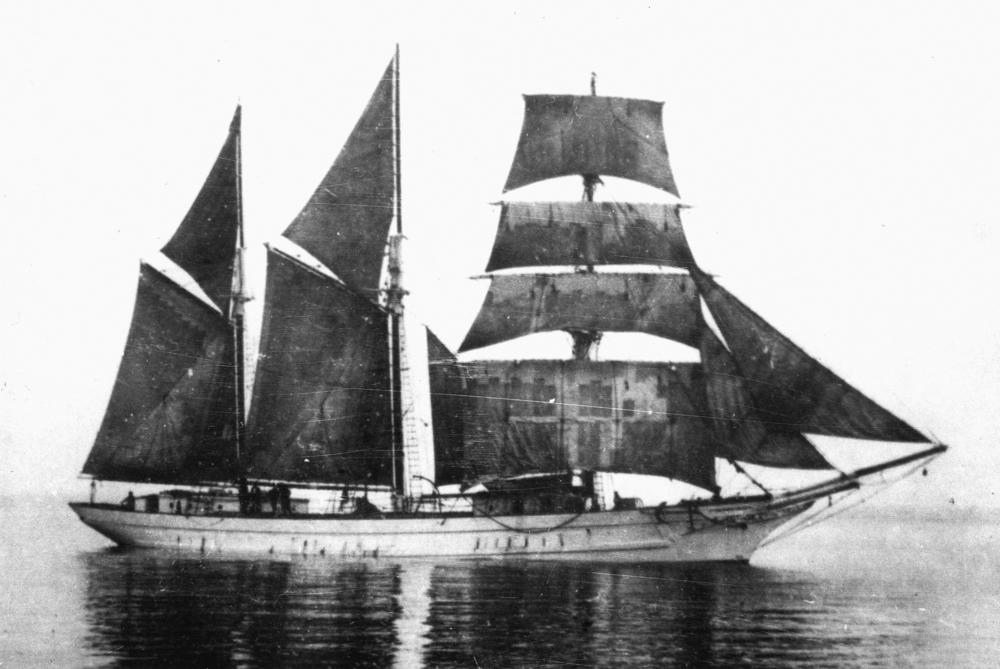
Southern Cross No. 4

Southern Cross No. 5

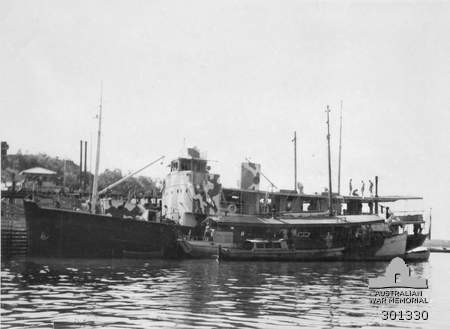
Southern Cross No. 7

Southern Cross is the name given to each of a succession of ships serving the Melanesian Mission of the Anglican Church and the Church of the Province of Melanesia. The first ship having this name succeeded the Undine, a 21-ton schooner built at Auckland and in service from 1849 to 1857.

== Ships ==
=== Southern Cross No. 1 ===
Southern Cross 1 was a schooner of 100 tons, built by Messrs. Wigram of Blackwall Yard, England in 1855; for £1,500. She arrived in New Zealand on 19 July 1855, and she was wrecked on 18 June 1860 at the mouth of the Ngunguru River, New Zealand, during an easterly gale. The first Southern Cross was funded by subscriptions provided by supporters of the Melanesian Mission. These included Charlotte Mary Yonge, who contributed the profits of her book The Daisy Chain.

=== Southern Cross No. 2 ===
Southern Cross 2 was a 93-ton yawl-rigged brigantine, which was built at Southampton and was in service from 1863 to 1873. This ship carried Bishop John Patteson to Nukapu where he was killed, His death was followed by the punitive expedition to the island in 1871 and 1872.

=== Southern Cross No. 3 ===
Southern Cross 3 was a three-masted, two-topsail schooner of 180 tons with auxiliary steam power of 24 H.P. She was built in Auckland at a cost of about £5,000, of which £2,000 was contributed from a fund collected by the Society for the Propagation of the Gospel in memory of Bishop John Coleridge Patteson. This ship was in service from 1874 to 1892.

=== Southern Cross No. 4 ===
Southern Cross 4 (British Registry Official Number 98988) was a three-masted schooner, foremast, square-rigged, main and mizzen, fore-and-aft rig. 240 tons with an auxiliary steam engine. The ship was built in Wivenhoe, Essex, England by Forrest & Sons in 1891 at a cost about £9,000, which was contributed by Bishop John Richardson Selwyn and others. This ship was in service from 1892 to 1902. When this vessel was sold, her engine was removed, and she operated as a cargo vessel around Australia and New Zealand until being lost with all hands off King Island, Tasmania in 1920.

=== Southern Cross No. 5 ===
Southern Cross 5 was a steel three-masted schooner with an auxiliary steam engine. This ship was built in Newcastle upon Tyne by Armstrong Whitworth & Co., with £1,000 towards construction contributed by the Society for Promoting Christian Knowledge, London. She was launched by Bishop Cecil Wilson in 1903. Her officers in 1914 included: William Sinker R.N.R. (captain), H. Burgess R.N.R. (chief officer), R. Gardner R.N.R. (second officer), W. Pitcher (chief engineer) and J. Murray (bosun).

=== Southern Cross No. 6 ===
Southern Cross 6 was steamer of 500 tons. The ship was wreaked in November 1932 on its first voyage into the islands. She was caught in a squall and driven onto a coral reef near Aneityum island of Vanuatu.

=== Southern Cross No. 7 ===
Southern Cross 7 (also known as Akanina, “the ship of all of us”) arrived in Tulagi harbour several months after the loss of Southern Cross 6 and her cargo, due to the immediate action by the Melanesian Mission Secretaries in both England and New Zealand. She was a twin-screw diesel powered ship, with a length of 110 feet and a breadth of 28 feet. She was 298.33 tons gross. She was sold in 1955.

=== Southern Cross No. 8 ===
Southern Cross 8 arrived in Honiara, Guadalcanal, Solomon Islands from Australia after 1955, and she was wrecked soon after during a storm at Maravovo on the north west coast of Guadalcanal.

=== Southern Cross No. 9 ===
Southern Cross 9 was built in Australia in 1962 at the request of the Bishop of Melanesia, Alfred Thomas Hill. She is currently in service after refurbishing and rededication in 2005 by Archbishop Ellison Pogo. As of late 2009, the ship was based at the Taroaniara Anglican Mission Station on the Nggela Islands.
