= Walter Baddeley =

British bishop (1894–1960)

- Bishop of Blackburn
- Photograph, published in 1935
- Diocese: Diocese of Blackburn
- In office: 1954 – 1960 (death)
- Other posts: Bishop of Melanesia (1932–1947); Bishop of Whitby (1947–1954)

Orders
- Ordination: 1921 by Thomas Strong
- Consecration: 1932 by Alfred Averill

Personal details
- Born: 22 March 1894 Portslade, Sussex, UK
- Died: 11 February 1960 (aged 65) Bishop's House, Salesbury, Clayton-le-Dale, Lancashire
- Denomination: Anglican
- Residence: Blackburn: Bishop's House, Salesbury
- Spouse: Kath Thomas
- Children: two
- Occupation: soldier (Great War): DSO MC
- Education: Keble College, Oxford

Walter Hubert Baddeley DSO MC* (22 March 1894 – 11 February 1960) was a British Anglican bishop who served as Bishop of Melanesia from 1932 to 1947 and Bishop of Blackburn from 1954 till his death.

== Family and education ==
Called Hubert by his family, Baddeley was born in Portslade, United Kingdom, and educated at Varndean School and Keble College, Oxford. When the First World War came, he paused his studies to join the British Army: he was mentioned in despatches four times and awarded the Distinguished Service Order (DSO) and the Military Cross (MC). In 1914, he had applied for a temporary commission, and his medical examination described him as 5 feet 9 inches tall, with a weight of 123 lbs but with a ‘chest 2 inches deficient’. He served in France from July, 1915, first with the Royal Sussex Regiment and, from June, 1918 with the East Surrey Regiment. Both his MCs have citations, and his Bar, gazetted on 13 September 1918, demonstrated his courage and leadership qualities. ‘For conspicuous gallantry and devotion to duty during an enemy attack. He commanded his company with great skill and determination. He reorganised and directed men in a masterly manner, and displayed the powers of command.’ There is no citation for the DSO. Baddeley had been promoted from 2nd Lt to Acting Lieutenant-Colonel during the War, and a reference on him dated 7 January 1919, noted that he ‘Commanded the 8th East Surrey Regiment with conspicuous success ... He has proved himself to be a capable and energetic commander in action and when out of the line.’

Baddeley was one of 10 diocesan bishops in England in the 1950s who had been combatants in the First World War.

Following completion of his degree (1920, Bachelor of Arts {BA} in Modern History), he trained for the ministry at Cuddesdon College. He married Mary Katharine Thomas, youngest daughter of Nutter Thomas, Bishop of Adelaide, on 13 November 1935 at St Peter's Cathedral, Adelaide (Thomas conducted the ceremony).

== Early ministry ==
Baddeley was made deacon on Trinity Sunday 1921 (22 May) and ordained priest that Advent (18 December 1921) — both times by Thomas Strong, Bishop of Ripon, at Ripon Cathedral. He served his title (curacy) at St Bartholomew's Church, Armley until 1924, when he became Vicar of South Bank, North Yorkshire (where his curate was John Dickinson, later his assistant-bishop in Melanesia).

== Melanesia ==
Having refused the role of assistant bishop of Melanesia to Merivale Molyneux in late 1930, Baddeley was recommended by Cosmo Lang, Archbishop of Canterbury to become diocesan bishop there after Molyneux's resignation; on 6 July 1932, the New Zealand bishops appointed him Bishop of Melanesia in 1932, and he departed Britain in October. He was consecrated bishop on St Andrew's day 1932 (30 November) by Alfred Averill, Archbishop of New Zealand, at St Mary's Cathedral, Auckland. During his time in the region, he served as a member of the Advisory Council of the Solomon Islands. Following his marriage in late 1935, he spent half of 1936 in Britain, and returned via Vancouver, Hawaii, Fiji, Sydney and Auckland.

Sending his wife and children to Adelaide, Baddeley himself remained in his diocese during World War II, paying particular attention to medical work among those injured in fighting with the Imperial Japanese Army. To hide from the Japanese, he moved hospital equipment into the bush, and continued throughout the fighting to minister to natives and to US and other Allied wounded at Guadalcanal. At the invitation of Henry St. George Tucker, Presiding Bishop of the Episcopal Church, he undertook a tour (1944–5) of the United States; he received an honorary Doctor of Sacred Theology (Hon STD) degree from Columbia University in 1944 and the US Medal of Freedom in 1945. In 1945, he was party to the agreement that the church in the Mandatory Territory of New Guinea (i.e. the north of his diocese) should be wholly ceded to the Diocese of New Guinea (the agreement was enacted 1 July 1949). His appointment as Bishop of Whitby (suffragan bishop in the Diocese of York) having been announced 20 December 1946, he undertook a farewell tour of his diocese and of New Zealand, he vacated his See c. March 1947 and departed for Britain on 2 April 1947.

== Return to England ==
He arrived in London on 10 April and had furlough before taking up his new post. Baddeley was a popular figure with the austere Archbishop of York, Cyril Garbett, but Garbett did not support him for the post of diocesan bishop of Blackburn. ‘Great vigour and personal zeal. On the intellectual side, he would be below the usual standard, for he reads very little’. However, the key figure in the appointments process was the Prime Minister, Winston Churchill, who would have been impressed by Baddeley's record in both World Wars. So, on 13 August 1954, his nomination as Bishop of Blackburn was announced, and he took up the See on 10 October.

He died in post at Bishop's House, Salesbury (Clayton-le-Dale, Lancashire) and his funeral was at Blackburn Cathedral on 15 February 1960, officiated by Michael Ramsey, Archbishop of York. Baddeley is listed in the Calendar of saints (Church of the Province of Melanesia).

Baddeley's son was Martin Baddeley, who was Archdeacon of Reigate, and his grandson is Jeremy Greaves, Archbishop of the Anglican Diocese of Brisbane since 2023.

Religious titles
Preceded by Merivale Molyneux	Bishop of Melanesia; 1932–1947	Succeeded by Gething Caulton
Preceded by Harold Hubbard	Bishop of Whitby; 1947–1954	Succeeded by Philip Wheeldon
Preceded by Wilfred Askwith	Bishop of Blackburn; 1954–1960	Succeeded by Charles Claxton
