= John Steward =

John Manwaring Steward (1874–1937) was the fifth Anglican Bishop of Melanesia, serving from 1919 to 1928. From 1924 he was assisted by Merivale Molyneux as assistant bishop. He was the son of Charles Edward Steward, also an Anglican priest. J.M. Steward was elected Bishop of Melanesia after 17 years of missionary work as a priest in the Melanesian Mission, which he joined in 1902.

In 1920 Steward moved the headquarters of the Melanesian Mission from Norfolk Island to Siota in the Solomon Islands. In 1925 he assisted Ini Kopuria in the formation of the Melanesian Brotherhood, a group of evangelists with a common rule of life. Steward is listed in the Calendar of saints (Church of the province of Melanesia).

Anglican Communion titles
Preceded by Cecil Wood	Bishop of Melanesia; 1919–1928	Succeeded by Merivale Molyneux
