= Bishop Patteson Theological College =

Coordinates: 7°15′8″S 159°41′49″E

- Former names: St Peter's Theological College
- Principal: Robert Santa Fakafu
- Students: 40
- Location: Kohimarama, Solomon Islands

Bishop Patteson Theological College (BPTC) is a theological seminary in Kohimarama, Solomon Islands. It is operated by the Anglican Church of Melanesia and is named after John Patteson, first Bishop of Melanesia. Its current name and location date from 1973; prior to this it was called St Peter's Theological College.

BPTC is a member of the South Pacific Association of Theological Schools. It offers Bachelor of Theology degrees. The student body is entirely Melanesian, and the languages of instruction are English and Pijin.
