= Richard Naramana =

Richard Naramana was the fifth Anglican Bishop of Ysabel, one of the nine dioceses that make up the Anglican Church of Melanesia. He was consecrated and installed on 18 April 2004; and retired in September 2015.
