= Gething Caulton =

British bishop (1895–1976)

Sydney Gething Caulton (1895 – 23 August 1976) was a British bishop who spent much of his career in New Zealand and the South Pacific.

A graduate of St Chad's College, Durham University, where he gained his M.A., Caulton was made a deacon in Liverpool in 1922 and ordained priest there the next year, and remained there until 1930 when he became a missionary in the Diocese of Melanesia.

He arrived in New Zealand in 1937, with his wife and son, to become Vicar of Whakatāne, and then Vicar of St Peter's, Onehunga. He was inducted Vicar of St Mary's, and installed (ex officio) as Dean of Auckland in February 1946. On 2 February 1948, he was consecrated a bishop by Cecil Cherrington, Bishop of Waikato, at St Mary's, and based himself in the New Hebrides (now Vanuatu). On completion of his time as Bishop of Melanesia (March 1954) he became Vicar of Northcote, then St George, Epsom, New Zealand (and Assistant Bishop of Auckland, 1955–1964) before his return to England as Assistant Bishop of Southwark (1964–68); in 1969 he lived in Auckland again.

Anglican Communion titles
Preceded by Walter Baddeley	Bishop of Melanesia; 1948–1958	Succeeded by Alfred Hill
