= John Selwyn (bishop) =

Anglican clergyman and bishop of Melanesia (1844–1898)

John Richardson Selwyn
- Bishop of Melanesia
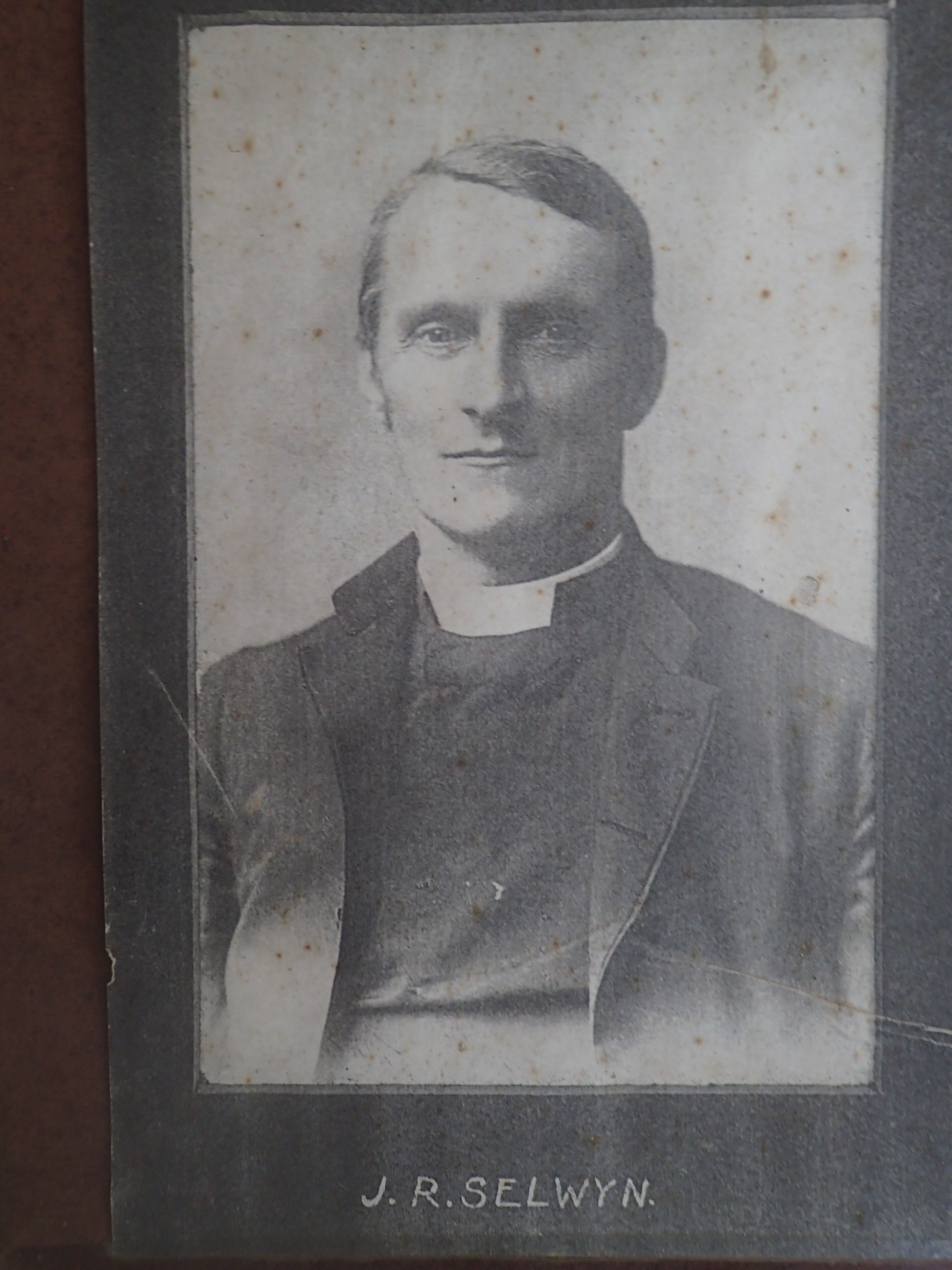
- Bishop John Selwyn
- Church: Church of England
- Diocese: Melanesia
- Appointed: 18 February 1877
- Predecessor: John Patteson
- Successor: Cecil Wilson

Orders
- Ordination: 1869 by George Augustus Selwyn (his father)
- Consecration: 18 February 1877 by: Samuel Nevill (Bishop of Dunedin); Andrew Suter (Bishop of Nelson); Octavius Hadfield (Bishop of Wellington); William Cowie (Bishop of Auckland); Henry Harper (Primate of New Zealand)

Personal details
- Born: 20 May 1844 Waimate North, New Zealand
- Died: 12 February 1898 (aged 53) Pau, France
- Parents: George Augustus Selwyn and Sarah Harriet (née Richardson)
- Spouse: Clara Long Innes (m. 1872; died 1877) Anne Catherine Mort (m. 1885)
- Education: Eton College
- Alma mater: Trinity College, Cambridge

John Richardson Selwyn (20 May 1844 – 12 February 1898) was an Anglican priest who became the second Bishop of Melanesia and then the second Master of Selwyn College, Cambridge.

== Life ==
Selwyn was born in Waimate North, New Zealand, the youngest son of George Augustus Selwyn and his wife Sarah Harriet, the only daughter of Sir John Richardson. His father was the first Bishop of New Zealand and then Bishop of Lichfield, in whose memory Selwyn College, Dunedin and Selwyn College, Cambridge were named.

Selwyn was educated at Eton College and Trinity College, Cambridge, graduating in 1866. Like his father, Selwyn rowed for Cambridge and took part in the Boat Races of 1864 and 1866, both of which were won by Oxford. In 1864, with Robert Kinglake, he won the Silver Goblets at Henley Royal Regatta, beating Edwin Brickwood and his brother in the final.

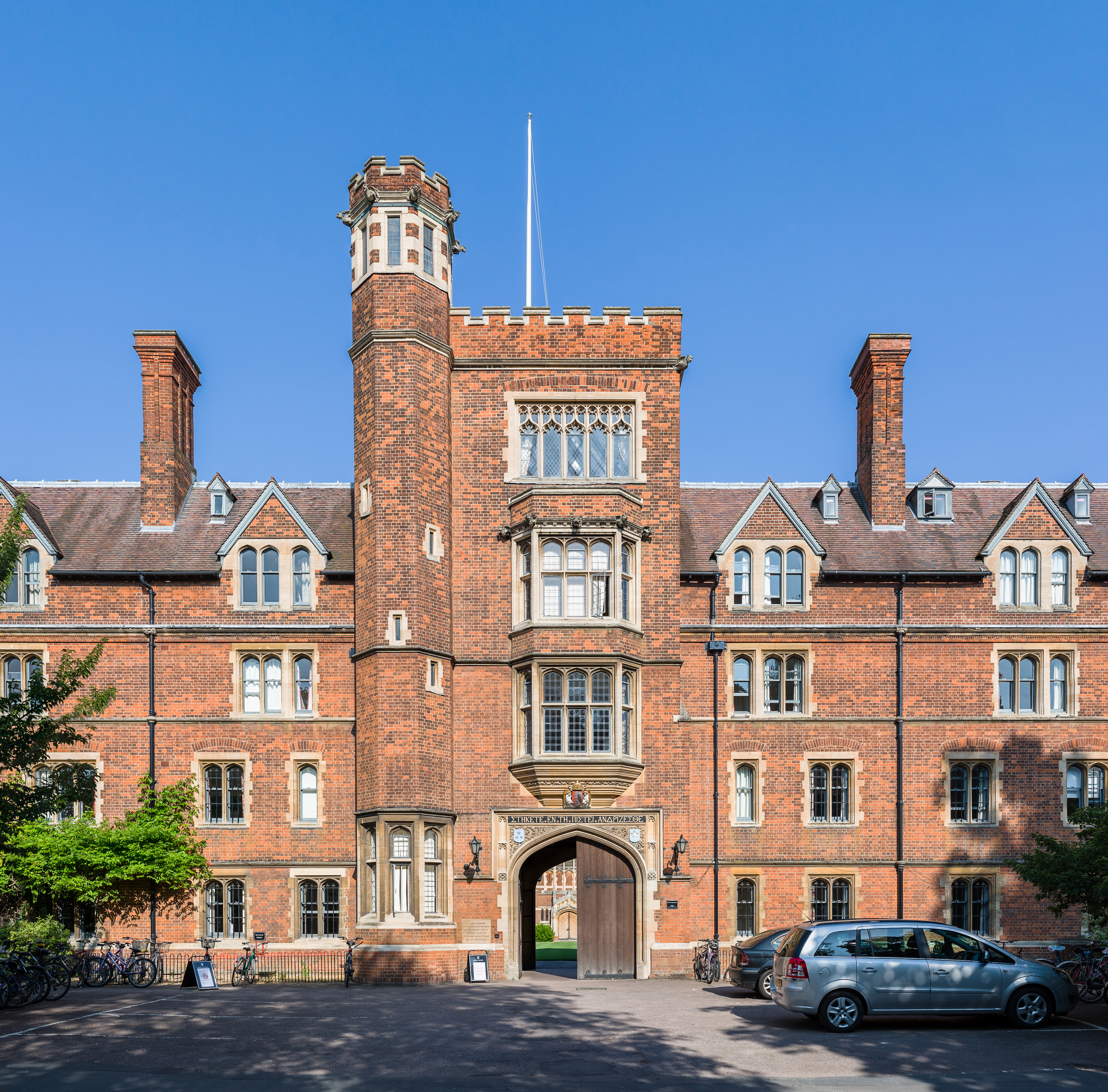
Selwyn College, Cambridge

Selwyn was ordained deacon by his father at Lichfield Cathedral in 1869 and priest the following year. He served as curate of All Saints Church, Alrewas, Staffordshire from 1869 to 1870, then curate of St George's Church, Wolverhampton from 1870 to 1871, before promotion to Vicar of St George's. In 1873 Selwyn travelled to Melanesia as a missionary, and four years later was consecrated Bishop of Melanesia.

He made significant financial contributions to the construction of the ship Southern Cross No. 4, serving the Melanesian Mission.

Illness forced him to return to England in 1891. Selwyn was appointed the second master of Selwyn College, Cambridge, in 1893. He held this position until he moved to Pau, France, at the beginning of 1898 on account of bad health. He died in Pau on 12 February 1898 within two weeks of his arrival and is buried there.

From 1892 to 1895 he also served as an Honorary Chaplain to the Queen.

Selwyn married Clara Long-Innes and, after her death in 1877, Annie Catherine, eldest daughter of Thomas Sutcliffe Mort, the Australian industrialist.

The south-east window of the chapel of Selwyn College was dedicated to the memory of John Selwyn in 1900.

His son George Augustus Selwyn is buried at the Parish of the Ascension Burial Ground in Cambridge; he died in 1912, aged 16.

Selwyn is listed in the calendar of saints of the Church of the Province of Melanesia.

== See also ==
- List of Cambridge University Boat Race crews

Anglican Communion titles
| Preceded by John Patteson | Bishop of Melanesia; 1877–1892 | Succeeded by Cecil Wilson |
Academic offices
| Preceded by Arthur Lyttelton | Master of Selwyn College, Cambridge; 1893–1898 | Succeeded by Alexander Francis Kirkpatrick |
