= Cecil Wilson (bishop of Bunbury) =

English cricketer and Anglican bishop

The Right Reverend Cecil Wilson
- Bishop of Bunbury
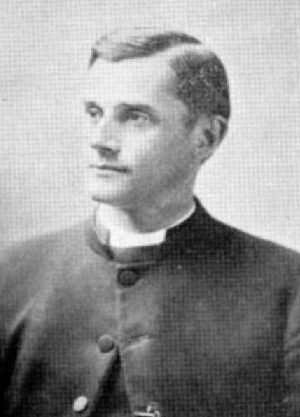
- Wilson c. 1900
- Church: Anglican Church of Australia
- Province: Western Australia
- Diocese: Bunbury
- In office: 1918–1937
- Other post: Bishop of Melanesia (1894–1911)

Orders
- Ordination: 1886 (deacon); 1887 (priest)
- Consecration: 11 June 1894

Personal details
- Born: 9 September 1860 Canonbury, London, England
- Died: 20 January 1941 (aged 80) Perth, Western Australia
- Denomination: Anglicanism
- Spouse: Ethel Julius (m. 1899)
- Relatives: Leslie Wilson (brother); Churchill Julius (father-in-law)

Cecil Wilson
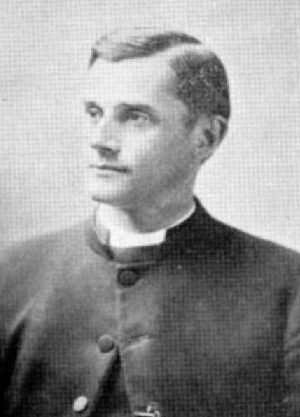

Personal information
- Height: 5 ft 11 in (1.80 m)
- Batting: Right-handed
- Bowling: Right-arm spin
- Role: Batsman

Domestic team information
- Years: Team
- 1882–1890: Kent
- FC debut: 12 June 1882 Kent v Yorkshire
- Last FC: 21 July 1890 Kent v Middlesex

Career statistics
Competition	First-class
Matches	33
Runs scored	1,193
Batting average	23.86
100s/50s	1/8
Top score	127
Balls bowled	366
Wickets	5
Bowling average	44.40
5 wickets in innings	0
10 wickets in match	0
Best bowling	1/2
Catches/stumpings	28/–
- Source: ESPNcricinfo, 14 October 2023

Cecil Wilson (9 September 1860 – 20 January 1941) was an English county cricketer and Anglican bishop. He was the third missionary Anglican Bishop of Melanesia from 1894 to 1911, and subsequently, the second Bishop of Bunbury from 1918 to 1937.

== Early life and family ==
Wilson was born at Canonbury in London, the youngest son of stockbroker Alexander Wilson and his wife Caroline (née Pitman). The family moved from Islington to Beckenham in Kent in 1873 and Wilson, like two of his older brothers, was educated at Tonbridge School. He played cricket in the school XI between 1877 and 1879, captaining the team in his final year at school, before going up to Jesus College, Cambridge. He graduated with a Bachelor of Arts in divinity in 1883 and Master of Arts in 1886.

On 1 February 1899, Wilson married Alice Ethel Julius, the second daughter of Bishop Julius, at ChristChurch Cathedral. The couple had two daughters.

== Cricket ==
Despite his success as a school cricketer, Wilson did not play for Cambridge University Cricket Club―his Wisden obituary says that he was unable to accept an offered Blue in 1883 "because of an engagement to travel abroad"―although he played some cricket for university teams and captained Jesus College in 1882. He played club cricket for Beckenham and made his first-class cricket debut for Kent County Cricket Club in 1882 whilst still at Cambridge, playing in seven top-level matches during the season and scoring 299 runs. He scored 62 not out in his second match for the county, a County Championship fixture against Sussex, made scores of 57 and 50 against the touring Australians during Canterbury Cricket Week, and was awarded his county cap.

Primarily a batsman, Wilson played for Kent in each of the following five seasons before returning to play his final two matches for the county in 1890. He made 28 appearances for Kent, as well as playing two first-class matches for I Zingari and three for Marylebone Cricket Club (MCC). A right-handed batsman, Wilson was considered a "fine batsman" who Wisden said "drove hard and scored rapidly when set". He scored a total of 1,193 runs in first-class matches, including one century, a score of 127 made against Yorkshire at Canterbury in 1886. He took five wickets with his right-arm spin bowling and was considered a fine fielder who "earned a reputation for fast, accurate returns to the wicket-keeper".

Wilson's brother, Leslie Wilson, also played first-class cricket for Kent, making 105 top-level appearances between 1883 and 1897.

== Ecclesiastical career ==
Wilson was ordained by Harold Browne, Bishop of Winchester, as a deacon in 1886, and as a priest the following year. He was in charge of St Faith's mission, in the parish of Portsea, Portsmouth, until 1891. Between 1891 and 1894, he held the incumbency at St John's Moordown, Bournemouth.

In 1894, Wilson was chosen to succeed John Selwyn as Bishop of Melanesia. He left England for New Zealand in April, and was consecrated at St Mary's Cathedral, Auckland, on 11 June 1894. He launched the fifth Southern Cross mission ship in 1903, and advocated for the movement of the centre of Anglican life in Melanesia to the Solomon Islands from Norfolk Island.

Unwilling, however, to himself move to the Solomons, in 1911 he was appointed rector of St Andrew's Church, Walkerville and Archdeacon of Adelaide, South Australia, which posts he held until his Bunbury appointment in 1918.

Wilson is listed in the Calendar of Saints of the Church of the Province of Melanesia.

Wilson died at Perth, Western Australia in 1941 at the age of 80.

== Publications ==
- Wilson, Cecil (1932). The Wake of the Southern Cross: Work and Adventure in the South Seas. London: John Murray.

== Bibliography ==
- Carlaw, Derek (2020). Kent County Cricketers, A to Z: Part One (1806–1914) (PDF). Cardiff: ACS.

Anglican Communion titles
Preceded by John Selwyn	Bishop of Melanesia; 1894–1911	Succeeded by Cecil Wood
Preceded by Frederick Goldsmith	Bishop of Bunbury; 1917–1937	Succeeded by Leslie Knight
