= Voil =

Voil may refer to:

== Company ==
- Voil (studio), Japanese animation studio

== People ==
- Ralph De Voil, English priest
- Walter de Voil, Scottish priest

== Places ==
- Loch Voil, Scotland
- Voil
