= Ellison Quity =

Bishop of Ysabel

Ellison Quity is the sixth Anglican Bishop of Ysabel, one of the nine dioceses that make up the Anglican Church of Melanesia: he was elected in November 2015.
