= Zephaniah Legumana =

Anglican bishop

Zephaniah Legumana, was the fourth Anglican Bishop of Ysabel, one of the nine dioceses that make up the Anglican Church of Melanesia. He served from 28 January 2000 to 2003.
