= John Chisholm (archbishop of Melanesia) =

John Wallace Chisholm (14 September 1923 – 24 May 1975) was an Australian divine who served as the tenth Anglican Bishop of Melanesia and first Archbishop of the Province of Melanesia.

He was educated at Trinity College, University of Melbourne and ordained in 1947. His first post was as a Curate at St Stephen's Church, Rochester Row, Westminster after which he was Sub-Dean of Ss Peter and Paul Cathedral, Dogura, Territory of Papua and New Guinea. From his consecration as a bishop on 24 February 1964 until 1967 he was an Auxiliary Bishop of the Diocese of New Guinea when he became Bishop of Melanesia, a post he held until 26 January 1975 aged 51, when the Diocese of Melanesia became a province and he automatically became Archbishop of Melanesia (and Primate) and Bishop of Central Melanesia. He died on 24 May, shortly after signing the last paperwork of the Province's creation process.

Anglican Communion titles
| Preceded by Alfred Hill | Bishop of Melanesia; 1967–1975 | Succeeded by Himself as Archbishop of Melanesia |
| Preceded by Himself as Bishop of Melanesia | Archbishop of Melanesia; Bishop of Central Melanesia; 1975 | Succeeded by Norman Palmer |
