= Richard Godfrey (priest) =

New Zealand missionary

Richard Godfrey was a priest who worked as a missionary for the Anglican Church in Melanesia.

Godfrey was educated at St John's College, Auckland and ordained in 1916. After a curacy in Middleton, Christchurch, New Zealand he was a missionary on Banks Island from 1918 to 1919. He was subsequently at Pentecost Island from 1920 to 1927, and on the Solomon Islands from 1928. He was Archdeacon of Southern Melanesia from 1934 to 1935. After his missionary service he served the church in Sydney, Aramoho, Grey Lynn, Onehunga and Point Chevalier.
