= Leslie Wilson (cricketer) =

English cricketer (1859–1944)

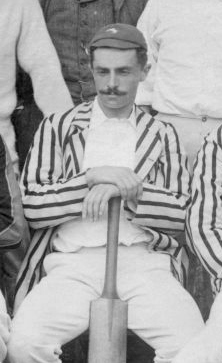
- Wilson as captain of the Kent team in about 1888

Personal information
- Born: 16 March 1859; Canonbury, London
- Died: 15 April 1944 (aged 85); Hastings, Sussex
- Batting: Right-handed
- Bowling: Right-arm medium
- Role: Batmsan
- Relatives: Cecil Wilson (brother)

Domestic team information
- Years: Team
- 1883–1897: Kent
- FC debut: 24 May 1883 Kent v Marylebone Cricket Club (MCC)
- Last FC: 20 May 1897 Kent v MCC

Career statistics
Competition	First-class
Matches	110
Runs scored	3,554
Batting average	19.42
100s/50s	1/18
Top score	132
Balls bowled	432
Wickets	6
Bowling average	44.16
5 wickets in innings	0
10 wickets in match	0
Best bowling	2/17
Catches/stumpings	78/–
- Source: CricInfo, 16 October 2023

Leslie Wilson (16 March 1859 – 15 April 1944) was an English stockbroker and cricketer who played for Kent County Cricket Club between 1883 and 1897. Wilson played in over 100 first-class matches for Kent and scored over 3,000 runs for the county.

== Early life ==
Wilson was born at Canonbury in London in 1859, the third son of stockbroker Alexander Wilson and his wife Caroline (née Pitman). The family moved from Islington to Beckenham in Kent in 1873 and Wilson, like two of his brothers, was educated at Tonbridge School. He opened the batting for Tonbridge in 1876, his final year at school, and played for Beckenham Cricket Club, although despite scoring well in club cricket he was not selected for the Kent team until 1883, the year after his younger brother Cecil first played county cricket.

== Cricket ==
A batsman who Scores and Biographies described as having "good style and judgement", Wilson made his first-class cricket debut for Kent in a May 1883 fixture against Marylebone Cricket Club (MCC) at Lord's, scoring 32 runs in the only innings in which Kent batted. He played in another seven matches during his first season of top-level cricket, scoring a half-century against Middlesex, but was unable to play frequently in 1884 or 1885 due to his business commitments.

Wilson worked as a stockbroker like his father and elder brother William. This limited his opportunities to play county cricket, although he was able to take time from work more regularly after 1887―he played in at least seven first-class matches each season between then and 1894, making 15 appearances in 1890 and 1893 and 14 in 1894. He made 18 half-centuries and scored his only first-class century in 1889, a score of 132 against Gloucestershire during that season's Canterbury Cricket Week―an innings which The Times described as "long and brilliant", with the match reporter considering that "a better display of batting has rarely been seen" on the ground. After the 1894 season he played only three more first-class fixtures, two in 1895 and a final match in 1897.

As well as 105 first-class matches for Kent, Wilson played five for other teams, including for the Gentlemen of England against I Zingari in 1888, and in two matches for both The South and MCC against the touring Australians in 1893. He made a total of 3,554 first-class runs, 3,459 of them for Kent, and took six wickets with his right-arm medium-pace deliveries.

Wilson played club cricket, scoring double centuries for Beckenham―including a score of 246 not out made in an opening partnership of 470 runs with WG Wyld in 1885―and at least four centuries for Band of Brothers, an amateur club closely associated with the Kent county club. His Wisden obituary described him as an aggressive batsman "always looking for runs" whose "cuts and drives to before and after the wicket made by perfect timing marked every innings of any length that he played", whilst commenting that "he sometimes erred in rashness" due to the aggressive nature of his batting. An obituary in The Times, however, described him as "a sound defensive batsman" who could "hit well when set".

== Later life and family ==
Wilson married Ida Eshall at Esher in 1886. The couple had two children and lived at Norbiton for most of their married life. Ida died in 1935 and later in life Wilson lived at Rye in Sussex. He died at nearby Hastings in 1944 aged 85.

== Bibliography ==
- Carlaw, Derek (2020). Kent County Cricketers, A to Z: Part One (1806–1914) (PDF). Cardiff: ACS.
