= Alfred Teall =

English missionary

Alfred Teall was an English Anglican priest who worked as a missionary for the Anglican Church in Melanesia.

Teall was educated at Dorchester Missionary College and ordained in 1921. He was on Ambae Island from 1920 to 1928; and Banks Island from 1928 to 1935. He was Archdeacon of Southern Melanesia from 1935 to 1959.
