= Diocese of Ysabel =

Coordinates: 8°08′S 159°35′E

The Diocese of Ysabel is one of the ten current dioceses within the Anglican Church of Melanesia.

It was one of the four founding dioceses established in 1975 and was inaugurated on 1 March 1975 at Jejevo Primary School. The diocese currently encompasses four regions and 28 districts or parishes, with its headquarters in Jejevo, Buala, located on Santa Isabel Island in the Solomon Islands.

== List of bishops ==
Bishops of Ysabel
From	Until	Incumbent	Notes
1975	1980	Dudley Tuti	First bishop; previously assistant bishop in the Diocese of Melanesia since 1963; retired in 1980 and knighted.
1981	1994	Ellison Pogo	Second bishop; consecrated and installed on 1 November 1981; became Archbishop of Melanesia in 1994 and knighted.
1995	1999	Walter Siba	Third bishop.
2000	2003	Zephaniah Legumana	Fourth bishop; consecrated and installed on 28 January 2000.
2004	2015	Richard Naramana	Fifth bishop; consecrated and installed on 18 April 2004; retired September 2015.
2015	present	Ellison Quity	Sixth bishop; elected 10 November 2015.

== Sources ==
- Anglican Church of Melanesia — Diocese of Ysabel
