= Thomas Cullwick =

English missionary and priest (1862–1948)

Thomas Cartwright Cullwick (5 March 1862 – 8 September 1948) was a priest who worked as a missionary for the Anglican Church in Melanesia and then held several incumbencies in New Zealand.

Cullwick was born at Hadley, Shropshire. He was ordained deacon in 1886, and priest in 1889. He was a missionary on Banks Island from 1887 to 1902 when he became Archdeacon of Southern Melanesia, a post he held until 1906. He was then on Norfolk Island from 1906 to 1913. He then served in New Zealand, holding posts at Waipawa, Hawkes Bay, Takapau, Te Rehunga and Ormondville. He is buried in Dannevirke on New Zealand's North Island.
