= Amos Waiaru =

Amos Stanley Waiaru OBE (19 April 1944 – 12 March 2011) was a Solomon Islands divine from Nafinuatog who served as the third Archbishop of the Province of Melanesia.

Waiaru was educated at Bishop Patteson Theological Centre, Kohimarama, Guadalcanal, and Pacific Theological College and ordained deacon in St Barnabas' Cathedral, Honiara, on 10 December 1972, and priest in St Paul's Pro-Cathedral, Lolowai, on 4 May 1976. His first post was as Chaplain at Vureas High School in Vanuatu. From 1981 to 1987 he was Bishop of Temotu in the Solomon Islands. He was installed as Archbishop of Melanesia on 17 April 1988.
