= Richard Blundell Comins =

English priest and missionary (1848–1919)

Richard Blundell Comins (15 November 1848 – 11 March 1919) was an English Anglican priest who worked as a missionary for the Anglican Mission to Melanesia. He became the first Archdeacon of Northern Melanesia in 1900.

Born in Tiverton, Devon in 1848, Comins went to New Zealand as a teenager to study farming. He arrived in Auckland Harbour on board the passenger ship Bombay in December 1862 and on his return to England did six months of surgical training at St Thomas' Hospital in London. He read for his licentiate in theology at Hatfield Hall, Durham and was ordained in 1873, and subsequently served for three years as a curate in Grantham.

Becoming a missionary in the South Pacific, he served successively in Emae from 1877 to 1880, San Cristobal from 1880 to 1894, and Siota from 1895 to 1902. In 1893 Comins was on board HMS Curacoa as it visited each of the Solomon Islands so its commander, Captain Gibson, could make the formal declaration of the British Solomon Islands Protectorate. He was the Archdeacon of Northern Melanesia from 1900 to 1910 and additionally served as the Chaplain to the Norfolk Islanders from 1903 to 1912, after which he retired to Shannon, New Zealand.

An amateur botanist, Comins sent flowers from Norfolk Island and the Solomon Islands to Kew. He died in Auckland, New Zealand, on 11 March 1919.
