= Archbishop of Melanesia =

Head of the Anglican Church of Melanesia

The Archbishop of Melanesia is the spiritual head of the Anglican Church of Melanesia, which is a province of the Anglican Communion in the South Pacific region, covering the nations of Solomon Islands and Vanuatu. From 1861 until the inauguration of Church of the Province of Melanesia in 1975, the Bishop of Melanesia was the head of the Diocese of Melanesia.

== Responsibility of the Archbishop ==
The Church of Melanesia consists of eight dioceses, formed into a single province. The Archbishop of Melanesia is therefore:

- Diocesan Bishop of the Diocese of Central Melanesia;
- Metropolitan Archbishop of the Province;
- Primate of the Melanesian Church, and its representative to the Anglican Primates' meeting.

== History of the See ==
The first Bishop of Melanesia was John Patteson, consecrated in 1861. Three years later his church suffered its first two martyrdoms, and the Bishop was himself martyred in September 1871. He is now remembered in the calendar (list of saints) of many Anglican provinces. In 1922, the synod of the then-missionary diocese was constituted by the New Zealand General Synod (at the Bishop's and people's request). The mission to Melanesia advanced, and the diocese was subdivided and regional diocesan bishops created, until on 26 January 1975. it was officially formed into a new Province of the Anglican church with the Bishop of Melanesia, John Chisholm, becoming the first Bishop of Central Melanesia and Archbishop of Melanesia. With the 1975 foundation of the province, the Diocese of Melanesia was split in four: the Dioceses of Malaita, of Vanuatu and of Ysabel were erected and the remainder became the Central Melanesia diocese.

The primatial archbishop title belongs ex officio to the diocesan bishop of that metropolitan see – as such, the bishop elected as archbishop leaves his previous see and is translated to Central Melanesia in order to become primate. Chisholm died shortly after appointment and the then dean of St. Barnabas Cathedral, Norman Palmer, was chosen the second archbishop. After Palmer's retirement, the third archbishop was Amos Waiaru, who served until Ellison Pogo replaced him in the office where he served for fourteen years from 1994 to December 2008. He was honored by Elizabeth II, Queen of Solomon Islands – becoming a Knight Commander of the Order of the British Empire – and by Rowan Williams, Archbishop of Canterbury – who awarded him the Cross of St Augustine.

== List of bishops ==
Bishops of Melanesia
From	Until	Incumbent	Notes
1861	1871	John Patteson	Martyred in office.
1877	1892	John Selwyn	Invalided back to the United Kingdom.
1894	1911	Cecil Wilson	Translated to Bunbury, Australia.
1912	1919	Cecil Wood	Returned to the United Kingdom.
1919	1928	John Steward	Returned to the United Kingdom.
1928	1931	Merivale Molyneux	previously assistant bishop; resigned following a mental breakdown.
1932	1947	Walter Baddeley	Translated to Whitby and later Blackburn.
1948	1958	Sydney Caulton	
1958	1967	Alfred Hill	
1968	1975	John Chisholm	Previously auxiliary bishop in New Guinea; became Archbishop of Melanesia in January 1975.
Archbishops of Melanesia
1975	1975	John Chisholm	Died in office, May 1975.
1975	1987	Norman Palmer	
1988	1993	Amos Waiaru	Translated from Temotu.
1994	2008	Ellison Pogo	Translated from Ysabel; knighted in 2000.
2009	2015	David Vunagi	Translated from Temotu.
17 April 2016	25 March 2019	George Takeli	Translated from Temotu; retired 25 March 2019.
2019	present	Leonard Dawea	Translated from Temotu; installed 15 September 2019.
assistant bishops
A priest named Clayton (probably Ralph Clayton, Vicar of St Dunstan's, Liverpool, member of the Melanesian Mission committee) was nominated assistant-bishop, and had accepted, but (by February 1924) had withdrawn before consecration, on grounds of ill-health.
1924	1928	Merivale Molyneux	initially for New Hebrides (Southern archdeaconry), then for whole diocese; elected bishop diocesan, 16 August 1928
1928	1929	Edward Wilton	second for Northern Melanesia; consecrated 11 June 1928, by Wright at Sydney; resigned 1 July 1929.
1931	1937	John Dickinson	for the Southern area
1963	1975	Dudley Tuti	Assistant for the Ysabel region; became first Bishop of Ysabel.
1963	1975	Leonard Alufurai	Assistant for the Malaita region; consecrated 30 November 1963; became first Bishop of Malaita.
1974	1980	Casper Uka	
1974	1975	Derek Rawcliffe	Assistant for the New Hebrides; became first Bishop of Vanuatu.
2022	present	Othnielson Gamutu	First assistant in DCOM; elected 3 November 2021;

== Archdeaconries ==
From 1900/3 until 1910, Richard Blundell Comins, in what is now the nation of Solomon Islands, was also called Archdeacon of Northern Melanesia. He was followed by William Uthwatt until 1915.

In 1933/4, Baddeley constituted a new archdeaconry of Southern Melanesia; followed in 1934 by that of Northern Melanesia (or "for New Britain and the Goldfields"), and in 1934/5 Ralph De Voil was collated the last Archdeacon of Northern Melanesia. De Voil was both priest-in-charge of St George's Rabaul and archdeacon until he returned to Great Britain in 1937.

Archdeacons of Southern Melanesia

- 1894-1902: John Palmer
- 1902–1913: Thomas Cullwick
- December 1933 – 1935: Richard Godfrey
- 13 July 1935 – 1939: Alfred Teall

== Recent elections ==
The college of electors, who choose the new primate during a vacancy, last met from 3–5 March 2009, to carry out their electoral duties following Pogo's retirement. They elected David Vunagi, Bishop of Temotu, as the new Archbishop of Melanesia. He was therefore translated to the Diocese of Central Melanesia and became the Archbishop of Melanesia ex officio. He was enthroned on the Feast of Pentecost, 31 May 2009. He left office on 6 September 2015, being replaced as acting Primate by Nathan Tome. On 12 February 2016, George Takeli was elected to become the new Archbishop of Melanesia. He was enthroned on 17 April 2016 at Saint Barnabas' Provincial Cathedral, Honiara.
