= Cecil Wood (bishop) =

British bishop

Rector of West Grinstead
- In office 1940–1946

Rural Dean of Horsham
- In office 1934–1940

Assistant Bishop of Newcastle and Vicar of Jesmond
- In office 1924–1933

Rector of Witnesham
- In office 1919–1924

Bishop of Melanesia
- In office 1912 – 31 December 1918

Vicar of Wimbledon
- In office 1906–1912

Personal details
- Born: 1874
- Died: 27 April 1957 (aged 82)
- Spouse: Margorie Allen Bell
- Education: St Peter's College, Oxford

Cecil John Wood (1874 – 27 April 1957) was the fourth Anglican Bishop of Melanesia, serving from 1912 to 1919.

== Biography ==
Wood was educated at St Peter's College, Oxford and ordained in 1897. He held curacies at High Halden, St Marylebone, and Bethnal Green before becoming Vicar of Wimbledon in 1906. Six years later he became Bishop of Melanesia, serving for seven years. He resigned his See effective 31 December 1918.

Returning to England he was Rector of Witnesham, 1919–1924; and undertook occasional episcopal duties, including as archbishop's commissary (i.e. acting diocesan bishop) in 1921. He was then appointed Vicar of Jesmond and an Assistant Bishop of Newcastle from 1924 to 1933. He was Rural Dean of Horsham from 1934 to 1940 and then Rector of West Grinstead until retirement in 1946.

He married Margorie Allen Bell, the sister of George Bell, Bishop of Chichester (1929–58). He died in 1957, aged 82.

Anglican Communion titles
Preceded by Cecil Wilson	Bishop of Melanesia; 1912–1919	Succeeded by John Steward
