= Edward Wilton =

Australian Anglican bishop

Edward Nowill Wilton (1872–1966) was an Australian Anglican bishop who served as Assistant Bishop of Melanesia from 1928 to 1929.

Wilton was born in Richmond, Victoria on 11 May 1872. He was educated at Trinity College, Melbourne and St Paul's College, University of Sydney. He was ordained deacon in 1901 and priest in 1902. He served as curate of St John Camden, NSW from 1902 to 1905; and as Rector of Mulgoa, NSW from 1905 to 1907. Wilton was Precentor of St Andrew's Cathedral, Sydney from 1907 to 1916; and a Canon Residentiary at All Saints' Cathedral, Bathurst from 1907 until his appointment as bishop.

Wilton was married to Miss Tamar Watson, daughter of William and Mrs. Watson of Camden on the afternoon of Thursday, January 23 1936 at Saint Andrew's Cathedral. The bride was given away by her brother Mr. Walter Watson and attended by two bridesmaids. Mrs Wilton wore a hydrangea blue frock with navy accessories and a bouquet of large salmon-pink roses (Talisman varietal). She was attended by two bridesmaids, Misses Lorna Cox and Alex Hunter who wore large black hats and frocks of dusty-pink, carrying bouquets of pink roses. The reception was cancelled due to the death of King George V (died January 20, 1936). The wedding was officiated by Dr. P. A. Micklim and Canon Baker of North Sydney. Rev. L. Walker and Mr. V Massey. Neither the bride nor groom's parents were in attendance, both Mr Wilton Senior and Mr Watson senior being deceased.
