= Alfred Hill (bishop) =

Anglican bishop (1901–1969)

Alfred Thomas Hill CMG MBE (2 November 1901 – 27 August 1969) was the fourth Anglican Bishop of Melanesia.

He was consecrated on Trinity Sunday 1954 (13 June), by Reginald Owen, Archbishop of New Zealand and Bishop of Wellington, at All Saints', Honiara. Made a deacon in 1938 and ordained priest in 1939, he had previously been Headmaster of Boys’ School Pawa, Ugi Island (1938–1954). He became a Companion of the Order of St Michael and St George (CMG) and a Member of the Order of the British Empire (MBE).

Anglican Communion titles
Preceded by Sydney Caulton	Bishop of Melanesia; 1954–1967	Succeeded by John Chisholm
