= John Dickinson (bishop) =

British Anglican bishop

John Hubert Dickinson (18 April 1901 – 31 May 1993) was a British Anglican bishop who served as Assistant Bishop of Melanesia from 1931 to 1937.

== Family and education ==
Dickinson was born in Longhoughton, Northumberland in the United Kingdom, the only son of Harry G. Dickinson, priest, and his second wife Edina C. V. Johnson; he was baptised on 23 June 1901 at Longhoughton by his father, and educated at Jesus College, Oxford before training for ordination at Cuddesdon College. In 1937, he married Frances Victoria (daughter of C. F. Thorp, a priest; she died 1991) and they had two daughters.

== Early ministry ==
Dickinson was made deacon in 1925 and ordained priest in 1926, both at York by Cosmo Lang, Archbishop of York. He served as curate of St John's Middlesbrough from 1925 to 1929 and became a Society for the Propagation of the Gospel in Foreign Parts (SPG) missionary in South Tokyo from 1929 to 1931, when he was appointed Assistant Bishop of Melanesia.

He was consecrated a bishop on 30 August 1931 by Alfred Averill, Bishop of Auckland, at St Paul's Cathedral, Wellington. He held the post of assistant bishop (for the Southern archdeaconry) until he resigned before April 1937.

== Return to Britain ==
Just before resigning his See, Dickinson had returned to Britain; on 4 June 1937 he was instituted Vicar of Felkirk-with-Brierley, West Riding of Yorkshire He moved North in 1942 to become vicar of Warkworth, Northumberland; and was (additionally) appointed an honorary canon of Newcastle Cathedral in 1947. In 1959, he left Warkworth to become vicar of Chollerton, also in Northumberland, remaining honorary canon; he retired in 1971 to Riding Mill.
