= Pacific Theological College =

Ecumenical theological college in Suva, Fiji

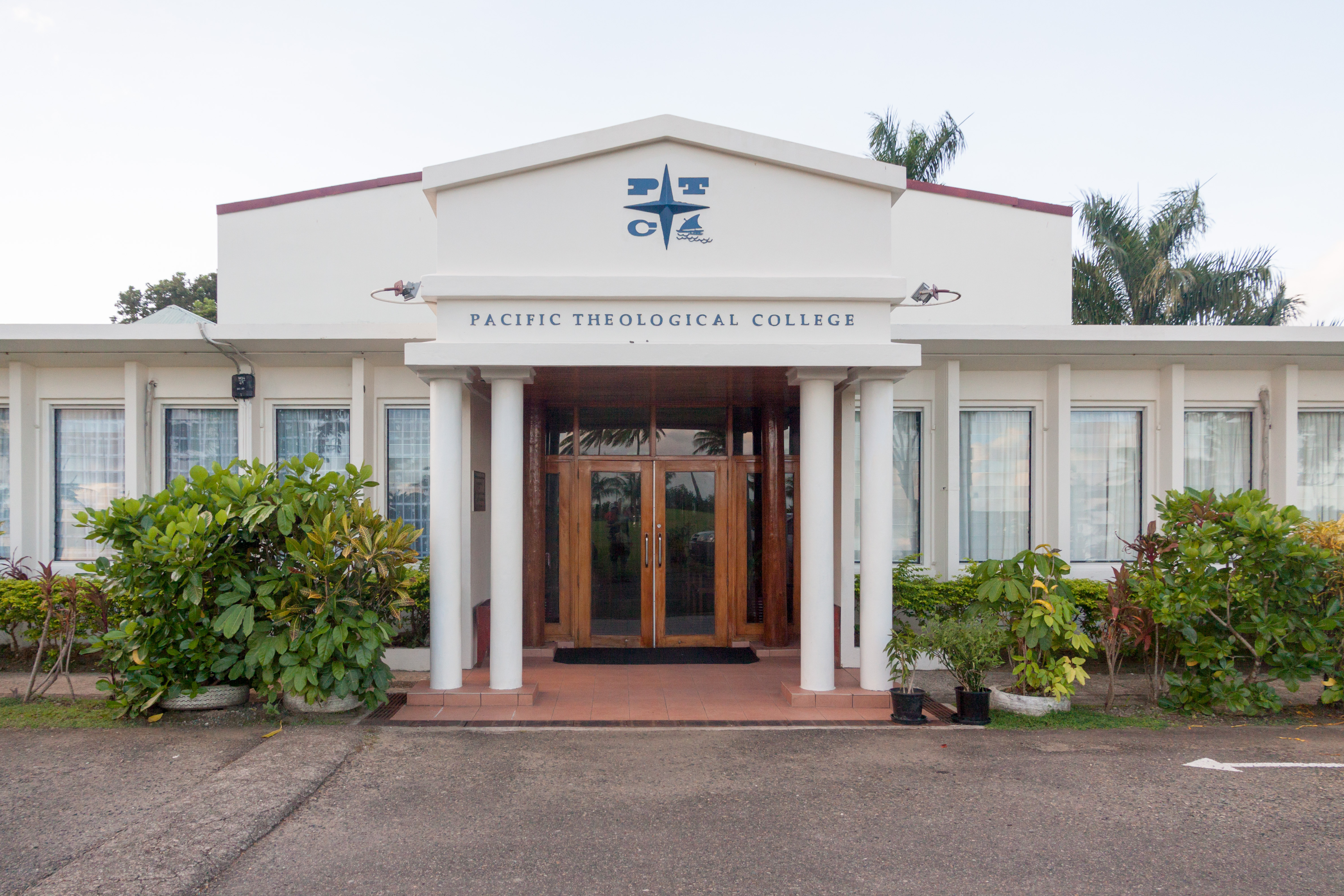
The Pacific Theological College.

The Pacific Theological College (PTC) is an ecumenical theological college located in Suva, Fiji. Established in 1965, it opened for training in 1966 and was originally designed as the only regional institution to offer degree-level education in theology, available primarily to students from Pacific Island churches. Many of the church leaders of the Pacific Islands have been educated at PTC since.

Today, PTC offers theological education at diploma, degree, Masters and doctoral levels. It has a distance education wing (PTC Education by Extension); incorporates the Institute for Research and Social Analysis; hosts the God's Pacific People Programme, which concentrates on personnel exchange programmes, capacity building programmes, and the Face-to-Face Programme (on behalf of the Council for World Mission); and offers conference facilities at its Jovili Meo Mission Centre.
