= Ralph De Voil =

English missionary (1903–1977)

Ralph De Voil (10 January 1903 – 1 March 1977) was an English priest who worked as a missionary for the Anglican Church in Melanesia.

De Voil was born at Clifton, Bristol on 10 January 1903. He was educated at the University of Leeds and the College of the Resurrection. He was ordained deacon in 1928 and priest in 1929. After a curacy in Oxhey he went out to Melanesia in 1931 and was Archdeacon of Northern Melanesia from 1934 to 1937. He served the Scottish Episcopal Church from 1937 to 1941, firstly in Aberdeen, then in Clydebank. He was Vicar of Mickley, North Yorkshire from 1941 to 1945; of Winterton from 1945 to 1948; and Castleton, North Yorkshire from 1948 to 1950. He then went out to Australia where he served in Chinchilla, Brisbane and Beaudesert.

De Voil died in Brisbane on 1 March 1977.
