= John Patteson (bishop) =

English bishop and missionary (1827–1871)

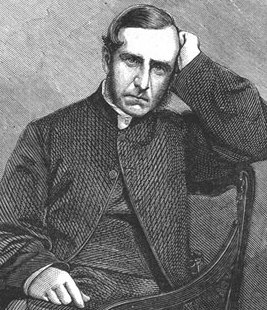

First Bishop of Melanesia and Martyr
- Born: John Coleridge Patteson; 1 April 1827; London, Middlesex, England
- Died: 20 September 1871 (aged 44); Nukapu, Solomon Islands
- Venerated in: Anglican Church of England; Anglican Church of Melanesia; Episcopal Church (United States)
- Feast: 20 September
- Education: The King's School; Eton College; Balliol College
- Father: Sir John Patteson

John Coleridge Patteson (1 April 1827 – 20 September 1871) was an English Anglican bishop, missionary to the South Sea Islands, and an accomplished linguist, learning 23 of the islands' more than 1,000 languages.

In 1861, Patteson was selected as the first Bishop of the Anglican Church of Melanesia. He was killed on Nukapu, one of the easternmost islands of the Solomon Islands, on 20 September 1871. Consequently, he is commemorated in the Church of England calendar on 20 September.

== Early life ==
He was the elder son of Sir John Patteson by his second wife, Frances Duke Coleridge who was a niece of the poet Samuel Taylor Coleridge. Patteson was brought up in Devon at Feniton Court, where his family resided, so as to be near the home of his mother's relatives at Ottery St Mary. After three years at The King's School, Ottery St Mary, Patteson was placed in 1838 at Eton College, under his uncle, the Reverend Edward Coleridge, son-in-law of John Keate, once headmaster there.

Patteson studied there until 1845. From 1845 to 1848, he was a commoner of Balliol College, Oxford, under Richard Jenkyns. He was not interested in academic studies, and obtained a second-class degree. However, at Oxford he began lifelong friendships with prominent figures such as Benjamin Jowett, Max Müller, John Campbell Shairp, Edwin Palmer, James Riddell, James John Hornby, and Charles Savile Roundell.

Having earlier played for the Eton school XI, Patteson continued his involvement with cricket at Oxford, playing for the Oxford University Cricket Club. In 1849, he appeared in the annual University Match against Cambridge University, which had first-class status. In that match, he scored 25 runs in the first innings but only two in the second, with Oxford going on to lose by three wickets after being bowled out for 69 in its second innings.

After taking his degree in October 1849, Patteson travelled in Switzerland and Italy, learned German at Dresden, and devoted himself to the study of Hebrew and Arabic. Languages were to be a lifelong interest. Returning to Oxford in 1852, he became Fellow of Merton College, and spent the years 1852 and 1853 at the college, where there had been recent reform.

== Ordination ==
On 25 September 1853, he was ordained as deacon and curate of Alfington, Devon, and on 24 September 1854 was ordained priest at Exeter Cathedral. On a visit in the summer of 1854, George Augustus Selwyn, the first Bishop of New Zealand, recruited Patteson as a missionary to the South Seas. Patteson left England with the bishop in March 1855, and landed at Auckland in May.

== Missionary work ==
Patteson arrived at Auckland in May 1855. For five years, he toured the islands on the Southern Cross, visiting the indigenous peoples and teaching them about Christianity. He ran the Melanesian Mission's summer school at Kohimarama, Auckland. He also founded St Barnabas College on Norfolk Island, as a training centre for missionaries.

Patteson is noted for his missonary work in Melanesia, with him eventually being consecrated as the first Bishop of that region on 24 February 1861, at Auckland.

A brilliant linguist, Patteson eventually spoke 23 of the more than 1,000 Melanesian languages. He printed grammars and vocabularies and translated some gospels into the Mota language.

In March 1864, Patteson visited Australia. In Sydney, he addressed a large meeting of British colonists, who pledged systematic support of the Melanesian Mission. Patteson devoted his private fortune to the mission, including money inherited from his father, and income from his Merton College fellowship. In 1867, he moved the Melanesian Mission to Norfolk Island, where it was called Saint Barnabas. In that milder climate, the school could continue in the winter months. Native foods, such as yams, could be grown so the students would feel more at home.

== Death ==
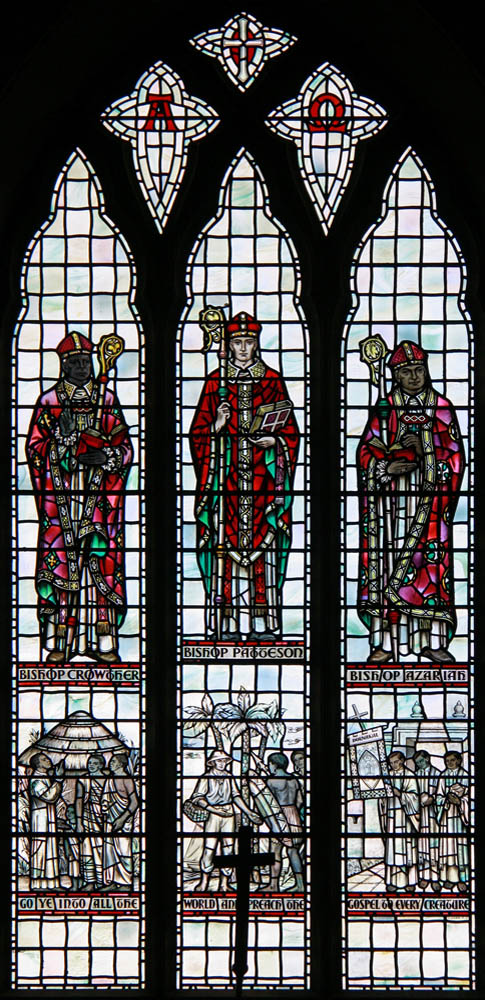
Stained glass window in St Mark's Church, Bromley, with Patteson in the centre

The years of the slave trade in the late nineteenth century created problems for Patteson and other missionaries. Numerous merchantmen, known as "blackbirders", sailed to the islands to recruit, often by deception and force, labourers to work on plantations in Australia or Fiji, under extremely harsh conditions. Sometimes ship captains ordered crews to cut off the heads of resisters, selling the heads at other islands and entering into the headhunter cultures. The slave-trade was technically illegal in the South Pacific at that time, and the traders called the natives indentured workers. Laws for their protection and return to their home islands were rarely enforced; the men were severely treated and many died; thousands of others were abandoned in the work islands.

Patteson worked with the colonial government to suppress the blackbirders and their trade. His task was made harder when traders from Australia began to visit the islands, keen to get men to go and work on their sugar plantations. Usually they kept the law and agreed proper terms of employment: but some simply kidnapped the islanders and carried them off in what became known as "snatch-snatch" boats.

On 20 September 1871, Patteson was killed on the island of Nukapu in the Solomon Islands, where he had landed alone. At the time, it was thought that natives killed him as revenge for the abduction of five men by illegal blackbirders a few days before, who had also killed one man. The 1911 Encyclopædia Britannica says that Patteson was taken for a blackbirder and killed, but the natives realised their mistake and treated his body with respect, as it was found floating at sea, placed in "a canoe, covered with a palm fibre matting, and a palm-branch in his hand".

Two Norwegian historians (Thorgeir Kolshus and Even Hovdhaugen, 2010) have examined the evidence in light of current interpretations related to agency and meanings given by the indigenous people. They have reviewed mission documents, as well as oral histories collected by ethnographers. They suggest that women, especially Niuvai, the wife of the paramount chief, played a more prominent role in the events. They led resistance to having their sons taken away to the distant mission school. Kolshus and Hovdhaugen argue that the natives may not have completely distinguished between the blackbirders and the missionaries, as both took young people away from the communities.

Alternatively, Kolshus and Hovdhaugen also suggest that Patteson had upset the local hierarchy by giving gifts without due regard for precedence, and by cultivating support among women in the community. This was contrary to patriarchal norms. The men considered him a threat to their social order and killed him.

== Legacy ==
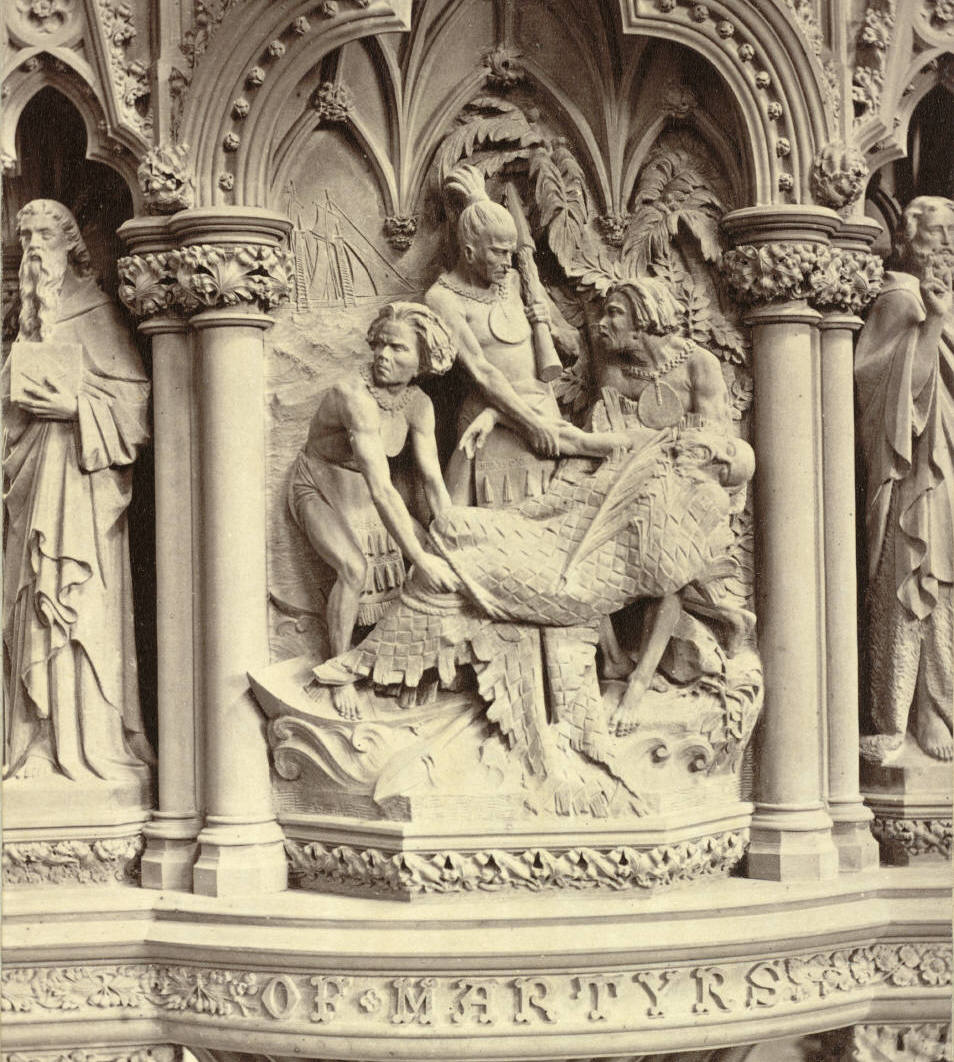
Exeter Cathedral's Martyrs' Pulpit, designed by George Gilbert Scott

As Bishop Patteson's death was associated with native resistance to the abuses of the blackbirders, the British government took measures to stamp out the slave trade in its Pacific territories. His death became a cause celebre in England; it increased interest both in missionary work and in improvement of the working conditions of labourers in Melanesia. The Aborigines' Protection Society took up the cause, resulting in a well-orchestrated campaign in Parliament from William McArthur for the annexation of Fiji to abolish slavery. Britain annexed Fiji in 1874.

Patteson is celebrated in Anglican churches for his saintly life and as a martyr; he is commemorated with a Lesser Festival on 20 September, in the calendar of saints and other Anglican churches. A bas-relief memorial by Thomas Woolner was installed in the Merton College Chapel. The portrait portrays him surrounded by palm leaves, with an image below of him lying in the canoe, as described above.

On Norfolk Island in 1882, the church of St Barnabas was erected to Patteson's memory, with windows designed by Edward Burne-Jones and executed by William Morris. In 1920, the Melanesian Mission was relocated from the island to the Solomon Islands to be closer to its target population. Port Patteson on Vanua Lava and Bishop Patteson Theological College in the Solomon Islands are both named after him. The Martyrs' Pulpit in the nave of Exeter Cathedral was erected in memory of Bishop Patteson who was ordained in the cathedral. It was designed by George Gilbert Scott in the 1870s. In 1873, a memorial for Patteson was erected by Sir John Coleridge at Fairmile Cross near Feniton, Devon.

Bishop Patteson is commemorated as the central figure in the stained glass window of the Seaman's Chapel of Lincoln Cathedral. He is also commemorated as the central figure of a stained glass window in St Mark's Church, Bromley, flanked by Bishops Samuel Ajayi Crowther and Vedanayagam Samuel Azariah.
