= St Mary's Cathedral, Auckland =

Historic church in Auckland, New Zealand

St Mary's Cathedral Church
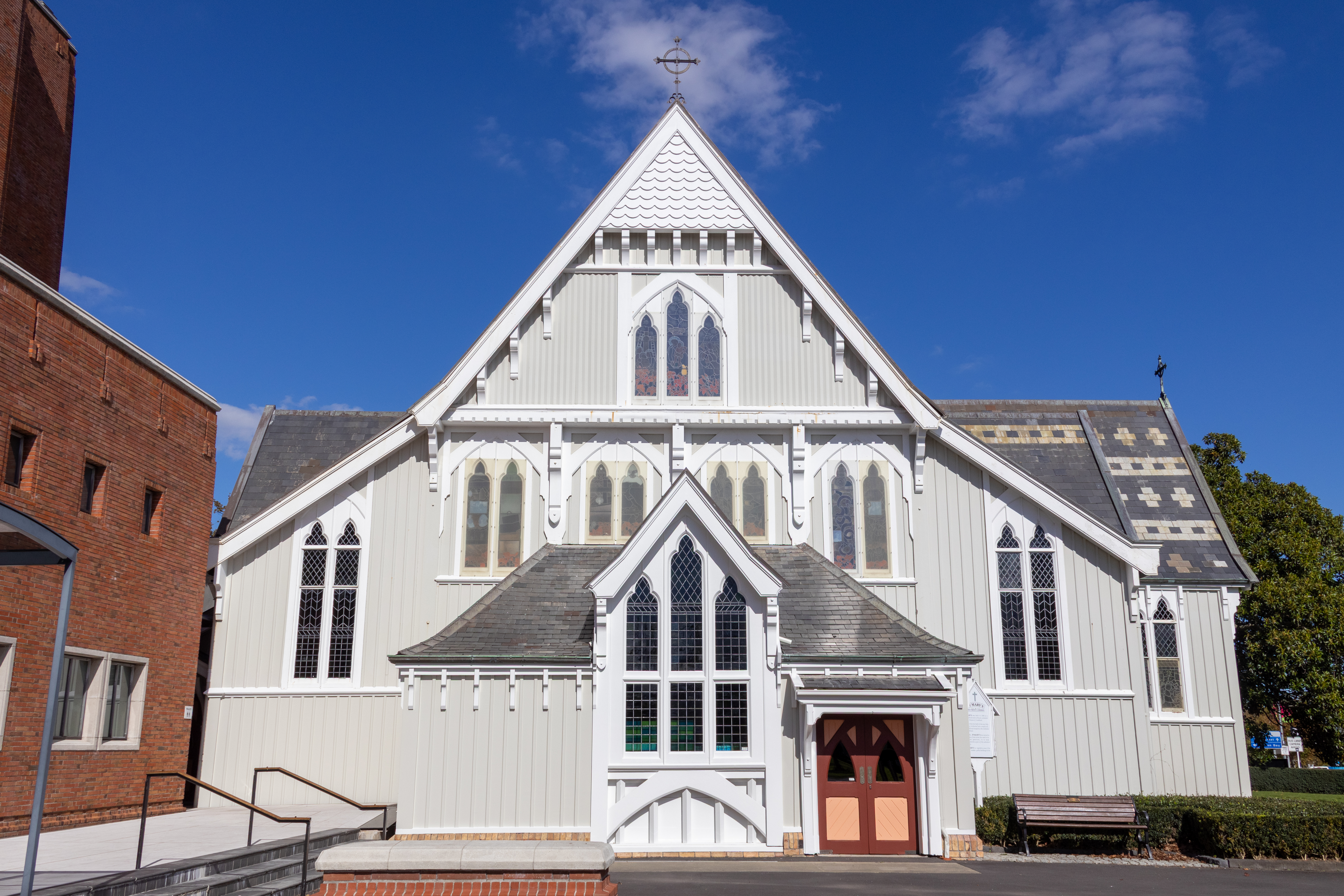
- St Mary's viewed from the north
- St Mary's Cathedral Church
- 36°51′36″S 174°47′00″E
- Location: Parnell, Auckland
- Country: New Zealand
- Denomination: Anglican
- Website: www.holy-trinity.org.nz

History
- Status: Church (since 1973); Cathedral (1888–1973)
- Founded: 1886
- Consecrated: 1888 (nave); 1898 (church)
- Events: Relocated to site adjacent to Holy Trinity Cathedral in 1982

Architecture
- Functional status: Active
- Architect: Benjamin Mountfort
- Architectural type: Church
- Style: Gothic Revival
- Completed: 1898

Specifications
- Length: 50 metres (160 ft)
- Materials: Timber

Administration
- Province: Anglican Church in Aotearoa, New Zealand and Polynesia
- Diocese: Auckland

Heritage New Zealand – Category 1
- Designated: 26 November 1981
- Reference no.: 21

St Mary's Cathedral Church, also known as St Mary's Church or St Mary's-in-Holy Trinity, is an Anglican church located in Parnell Road, Parnell, a suburb of Auckland, New Zealand. The building served as the cathedral church and principal Anglican church of the Diocese of Auckland until 1973 when the chancel of Holy Trinity Cathedral, for which the foundation stone was laid in 1957, came into use.

This wooden Gothic Revival church was designed by the prominent Christchurch architect Benjamin Mountfort and completed in 1897. It replaced the earlier Old St Mary's Church. In 1982, St Mary's Church was moved across Parnell Road to its present site beside the Holy Trinity Cathedral. The church was registered by the New Zealand Historic Places Trust as a Category I building in 1981.

== History ==
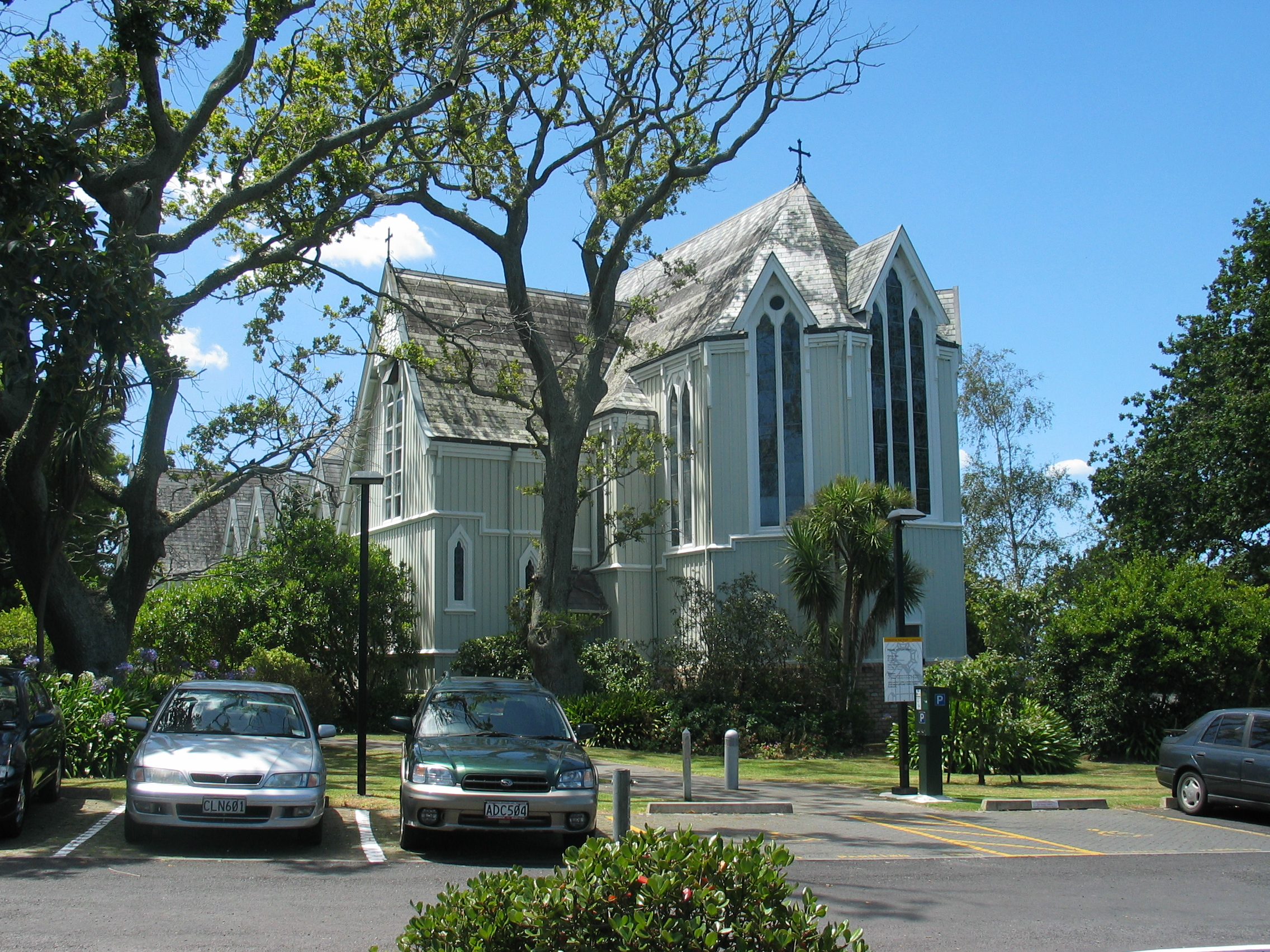
St Mary's Church. The wooden three-sided altar tribune reminiscent of a Romanesque European cathedral

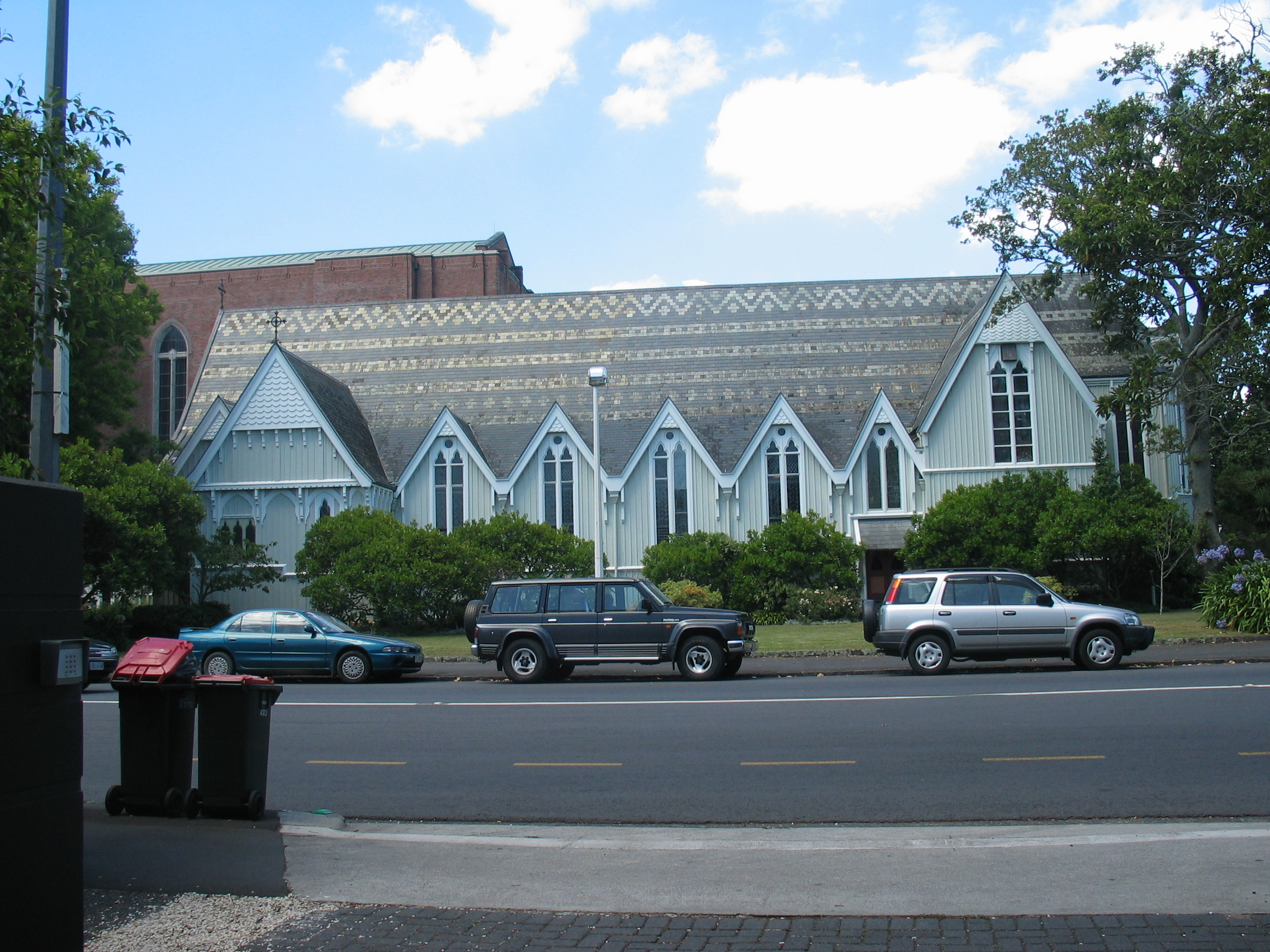
St Mary's Church. Some of the church's numerous gables, their Gothic lancet windows echoed in the design of the windows of the new cathedral immediately behind

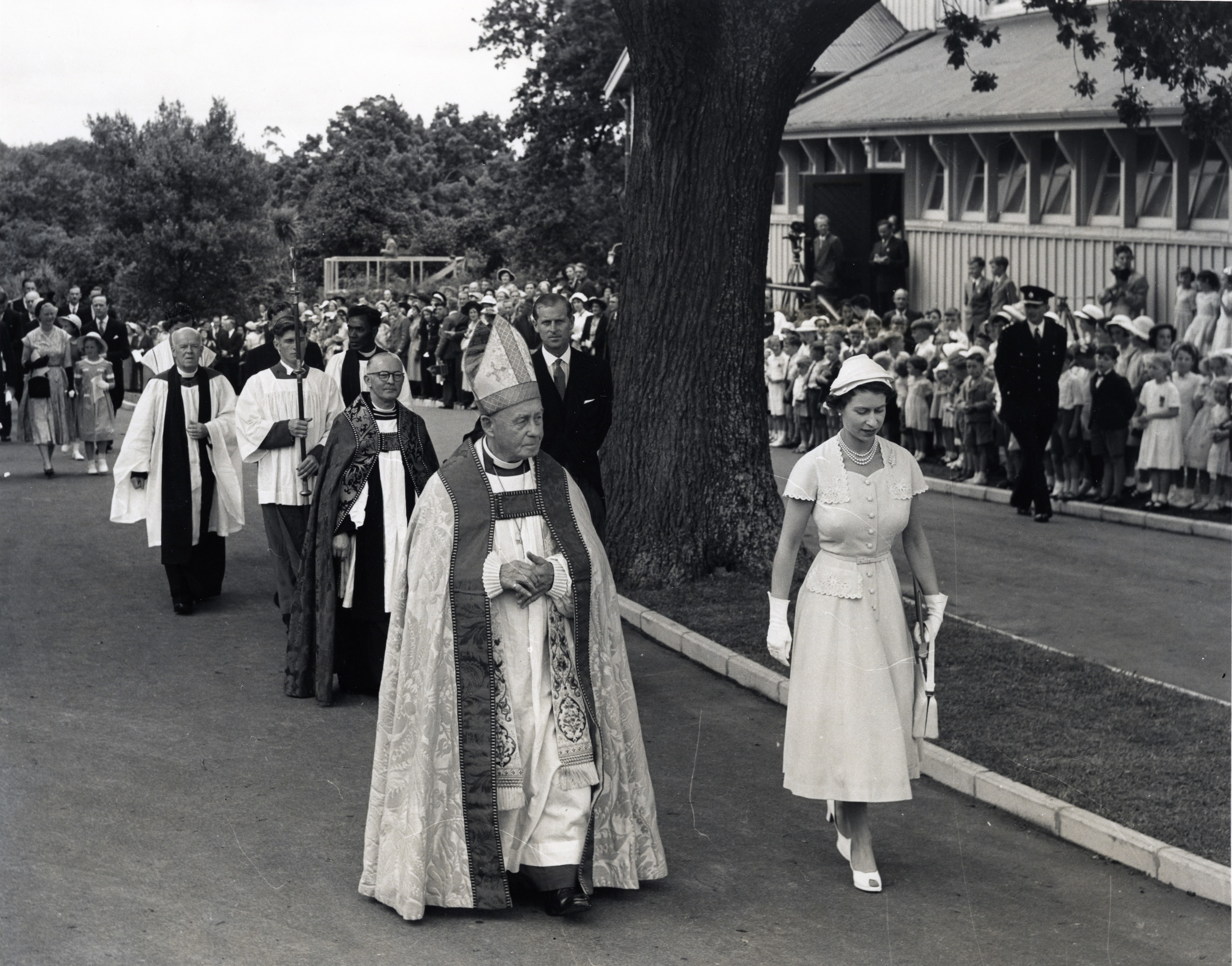
Elizabeth II at St Mary's Cathedral, 25 December 1953

The original church, which came to be known as Old St Mary's, was built in 1860. The foundation stone for the current church was laid in 1886. At more than 50 metres (160 ft) long, it is the largest wooden Gothic church in the world. Its English-born architect, Benjamin Mountfort, had become one of New Zealand's most eminent architects, responsible for many of the Gothic Revival buildings in Christchurch. St Mary's is generally regarded as the most impressive of his wooden church designs.

The original intention had been to build the church in stone, but the plan had been rejected as too expensive. Mountfort seems to have ignored the perishable and limited qualities of wood, and built a vast church worthy of the finest stone. St Mary's covers an area of 840.0 square metres (9,042 sq ft) and has architectural features normally associated only with the great medieval cathedrals of Europe.

Bishop William Cowie instigated the decision to make St Mary's the cathedral church in 1887, and the first part of the church, consisting of the chancel and three bays of the nave, has been consecrated and used since 1888.

The church was completed to its present state with the addition of the four final bays and consecrated in 1898. It was Mountfort's final large-scale work.

Externally, the most noticeable architectural features of the long rectangular building are the numerous gables of the mostly single-story structure. The gables, often placed above lancet-shaped windows, serve to accentuate the Gothic motifs. This is particularly evident on the exterior of the altar tribune, where three tall, narrow windows rise up into the gables. The tribune itself is three sided, with the wooden construction making the traditional Romanesque curve in stone impossible.

The opposing end of the church, containing the principal entrance, displays the full height of the building with one large gable, containing not only ground-floor windows but two levels of clerestory windows above. The gable here slopes at two angles. The architect's reasoning for this was to increase the height of the gable at the façade's centre, rather than allow it to rise uniformly according to the width of the building. This central steeper roof pitch increased the ceiling height to the central aisle, as would be found over the central aisle of a true Gothic cathedral. However, the resultant effect has been to create a gable that appears to be designed to bear the weight of heavy snowfall. In an area where snow does not occur, this gives the façade, with its protruding decorated architrave above the first clerestory, an almost 'whimsical Swiss chalet atmosphere', which adds greatly to the building's distinctness. Almost a hundred years later, this feature was subtly suggested in the corresponding roofline of the new cathedral nave.

In 1982, St Mary's Church was moved into the precinct of the Cathedral of the Holy Trinity, a major feat of engineering when the church was transported across the road and turned 90° onto its present site.

== Heritage registration ==
St Mary's Cathedral Church was registered by the New Zealand Historic Places Trust as a Category I building on 26 November 1981 with registration number 21.
