= Siota =

Coordinates: 9°4′15″S 160°19′31″E

Siota is a region on the north side of Nggela Island at the western end of Utuhu Passage in the Central Province of Solomon Islands, a state in the southwest Pacific Ocean:
