= Melanesian Mission =

Anglican missionary agency in Melanesia

The Melanesian Mission is an Anglican missionary agency supporting the work of local Anglican churches in Melanesia. It was founded in 1849 by George Selwyn, the first Bishop of New Zealand.

== History ==
Bishop Selwyn's see was focused on New Zealand. In December 1847 he began a series of voyages to the Pacific Islands, which were included in his diocese by a clerical error in his letters patent. His see should have been defined as lying between 34th and 50th degrees of south latitude. The clerk drafted the boundaries as lying between 34th degrees of north latitude and 50th degrees of south latitude, which include islands to the north of New Zealand. At the time of his appointment, Selwyn was aware of this clerical error, but he chose not to point it out.

His letters and journals of these journeys through Melanesia present the reader with a vivid picture of his versatility, courage, and energy. In 1849 he formed the Melanesian Mission to work in the Western Pacific.

The Undine, a small 21-ton schooner, serviced the mission from 1849 to 1857. In 1854, Selwyn commissioned the construction of a 100-ton schooner, the Southern Cross to service the mission and enlisted John Coleridge Patteson to lead the mission. His voyages and the administrative work resulted in 1861 in the consecration of Patteson as the first Bishop of Melanesia.

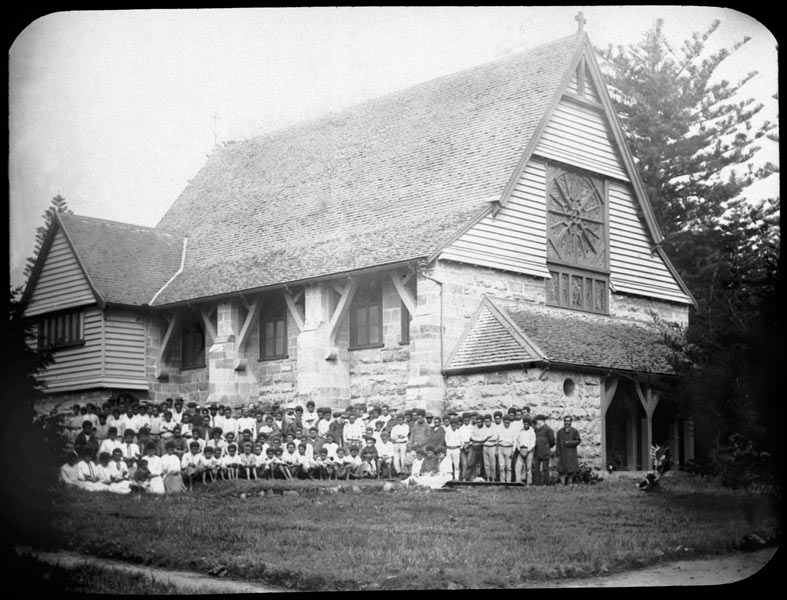
Bishop Patteson Memorial Church (St Barnabas), Norfolk Island in 1908

In 1867, the Mission established St Barnabas College on Norfolk Island, as a church and training centre for missionaries. The Melanesian Mission established an administrative centre on Mota island in the Banks Islands (now part of Vanuatu) and the Mota language became the lingua franca of the mission.

== Members of the mission ==
The missionaries included:

- Bishop John Coleridge Patteson;
- Percy Temple Williams (born 19 March 1866; died 12 October 1933) who was active from 1895 to 1899 in the Melanesian Mission in Queensland, Australian; in the Guadalcanal diocese of Melanesia.
- Richard Cuthbert Rudgard (born 28 December 1901; died 19 April 1985): During World War II a Chaplain to the Forces (mentioned in despatches thrice); later Archdeacon of Basingstoke from 1958 until his retirement in 1971.

== Current activities ==
Today it continues to provide financial and staffing support for the Anglican Church of Melanesia, an independent province of the Anglican Communion. Its headquarters are in Feniton, Devon.
