= Anglican Church of Melanesia =

Church of the Anglican Communion

Church of Melanesia
- Abbreviation: ACOM, COM
- Classification: Protestant (with mostly Anglo-Catholic churchmanship)
- Orientation: Anglican
- Scripture: Holy Bible
- Theology: Anglican doctrine
- Polity: Episcopal
- Primate: Leonard Dawea
- Region: Melanesia
- Language: English, Melanesian Pidgin and various other Melanesian languages
- Liturgy: Anglican Liturgy
- Headquarters: Honiara, Solomon Islands
- Territory: Solomon Islands, Vanuatu, New Caledonia and Torres Strait Islands
- Branched from: ACANZP, C of E
- Members: 244,000
- Official website: www.acom.org.sb

The Church of Melanesia (CoM), also known as the Anglican Church of Melanesia (ACoM) and Church of the Province of Melanesia, is a church of the Anglican Communion and includes nine dioceses in Solomon Islands, Vanuatu, New Caledonia. The Archbishop of Melanesia is Leonard Dawea. He succeeds the retired archbishop George Takeli. In 2017, Growth and Decline in the Anglican Communion: 1980 to the Present, published by Routledge, collected research reporting there were 409,000 Anglicans in Melanesia.

== History ==
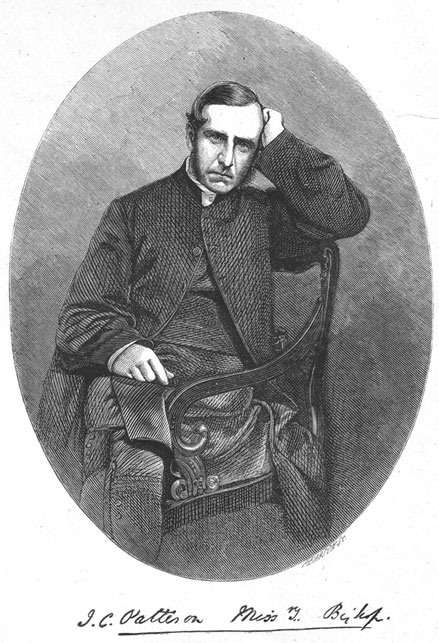
John Coleridge Patteson died a martyr's death in 1871

The church was established by George Selwyn, Bishop of New Zealand in 1849, and was initially headed by a Bishop of Melanesia. One of the important features of the province's life over many years has been the work of a mission vessel in various incarnations known as the Southern Cross. First based in New Zealand, the missionaries, mainly from Oxbridge and the public schools, established their base on Norfolk Island, bringing Melanesian scholars there to learn Christianity until the school was closed in 1918.

The many languages in Melanesia made evangelisation a challenge. The Melanesian Mission adopted the language of the island of Mota in the Banks group of islands as the lingua franca. The Church of Melanesia is known for its pioneer martyrs, especially John Patteson, murdered in 1871, Charles Godden, killed in 1906, among several others.

== Membership ==
Today, there are approximately 244,000 Anglicans out of an estimated population of over 800,000 in Solomon Islands, Vanuatu, and Nouméa, New Caledonia.

== Structure ==
The polity of the Church of Melanesia is episcopal, which is the same as all other Anglican churches. Since being made a province in 1975 the church has maintained a system of geographical parishes organised into dioceses, of which there are now ten. The spiritual head of the province is the Archbishop of Melanesia, whose metropolitan see is the Diocese of Central Melanesia.

The dioceses are: Central Melanesia; Malaita, Vanuatu and New Caledonia (originally New Hebrides), and Ysabel (all 1975); Temotu (1981); Hanuato'o (1991); Banks and Torres (1996); Central Solomons (1997); Guadalcanal (2013); and Southern Malaita and Sikaiana (2024).

On November 18, 2026 the Anglican Church of Melanesia and the Anglican Diocese of Polynesia signed a memorandum on understanding on seminary partnerships and shared support for the Melanesian Commission.

=== Parishes and priests ===
Each diocese except for Central Melanesia (the Honiara area) is divided into regions, each headed by a senior priest. The regions are further subdivided into parishes or districts (the two words being interchangeable), headed by a parish priest, usually called a rector. Parishes may be subdivided into subparishes, headed by assistant priests. Catechists are lay people appointed by a local community and authorised by the bishop to take services and look after the spiritual life of a village.

=== Theological college ===
Bishop Patteson Theological College is a theological seminary in Kohimarama, operated by the Anglican Church of Melanesia. Its current name and location date from 1973; prior to this it was called St Peter's Theological College.

== Worship and liturgy ==
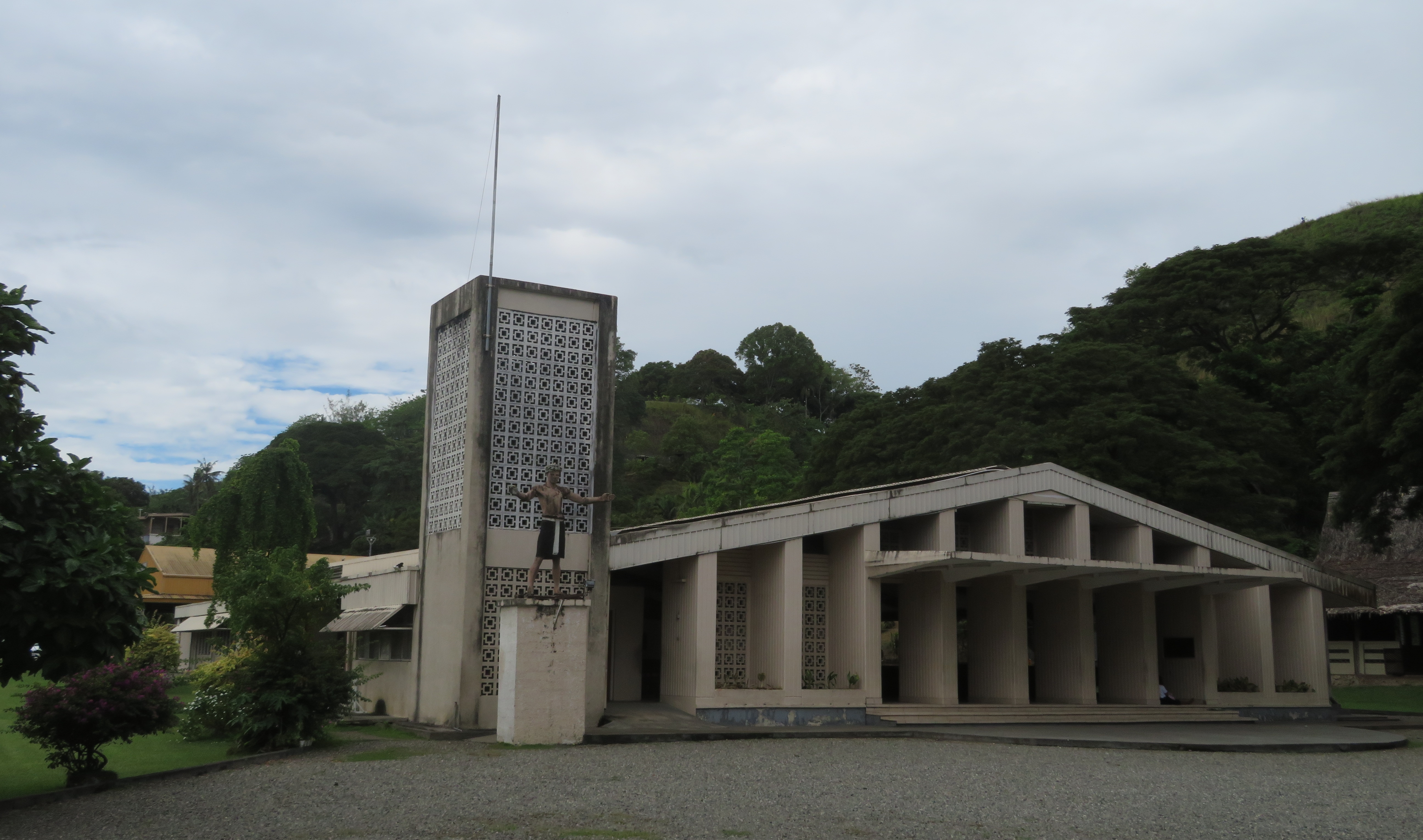
St. Barnabas Anglican Cathedral, Honiara, Solomon Islands

The Church of Melanesia embraces three orders of ordained ministry: deacon, priest and bishop. A local variant of the Book of Common Prayer is used, called A Melanesian English Prayer Book. Its predecessor in local liturgical development was A Book of Common Prayer Authorised for Use in Churches and Chapels in the Diocese of Melanesia, first published in 1938.

== Doctrine and practice ==
See also: Anglicanism and Anglican doctrine

The centre of the Church of Melanesia's teaching is the life and resurrection of Jesus Christ. The basic teachings of the church are summed up in the Apostles' Creed and the Nicene Creed.

The Church is overwhelmingly High Church, thus the focus of the church's worship is the celebration of the Holy Eucharist, sometimes called "Mass", but more often "Communion" or "Communion service". This is celebrated weekly wherever there is a priest and in some communities it is celebrated daily, except for Saturdays.

Morning Prayer and Evening Prayer are offered in most churches and congregations daily; the Angelus/Regina Coeli is prayed at noon, especially in religious communities and mission schools. Evening Prayer, "Evensong", is often sung (except for the Psalms) on Sundays and feasts.

Feast days are celebrated by most communities on a Sunday near the feast day, or at least in the same month.

The church in its canons accepts and teaches the seven sacraments of the Church, Baptism, Holy Eucharist, Confirmation, Penance, Holy Matrimony, Holy Orders, and Anointing of the Sick.

=== Ordination of Women ===
In 2003, the General Synod voted in favor of the ordination of women to the diaconate, priesthood, and episcopate. However, the constitutional amendment necessary was rejected by the ten diocesan synods, meaning that women may not be ordained in the Church of Melanesia. Currently, a woman ordained as a priest in another province of the Anglican Communion may preside over the Sacraments in the Church of Melanesia if she is licensed by the diocesan bishop to do so.

=== Ecumenical relations ===
Like other Anglican churches, the Church of Melanesia is a member of the ecumenical World Council of Churches, and is a member of the Pacific Conference of Churches, the Solomon Islands Christian Council, and the Vanuatu Council of Churches.

The Mothers' Union is quite active, as are the four religious communities active in the province, the Melanesian Brotherhood, the Society of Saint Francis, the Community of the Sisters of the Church and the Community of the Sisters of Melanesia. The province has its own liturgical customs and a calendar of saints.

== Anglican realignment ==
The Church of Melanesia is a member of the Global South and has been involved in the Anglican realignment movement. David Vunagi attended the Global South Fourth Encounter at 19–23 April 2010, in Singapore. He also would be one of the signatories of the Global South Primates letter to the Crown Nominations Commission, at 20 July 2012. Nevertheless, other clergy have sided with the more liberal Anglican provinces, including Terry Brown, former Bishop of Malaita, who has spoken "as an 'out' gay man serving as bishop".
