= Chinese people in Palau =

Chinese in Palau
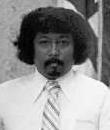
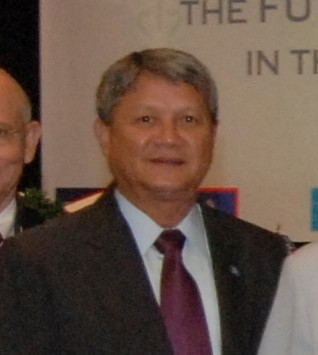
- Yutaka Gibbons, (Note: A former mayor of Koror and High Chief of Koror. Gibbons' paternal grandfather was Chinese. His father inherited the chieftain title from his mother (Ibedul's grandmother). Text source: "Chief Gibbons is a generation removed from Chief Termeteet. His father is a half-blooded Chinese from large and powerful clan of __. He inherited the crown by his mother's line. A veteran of the US Army, he was called back from the service to assume his reign at the death of his uncle,...") Elias Camsek Chin

Total population
- 1,019 (4.9% of the population, 2000)

Languages
- Chinese, Palauan, English

Religion
- Christianity, Chinese folk religion

Related ethnic groups
- Palauans, Overseas Chinese

Chinese have been settling in Palau in small numbers since the 19th century. The early settlers consisted of traders and labourers, and often intermarried with Palauan women. Their offspring quickly assimilated with the local populace and generally identify themselves as Palauan. In recent years, Palau has seen a growing expatriate business community from Taiwan, after Palau established formal diplomatic ties with Taiwan in 1999.

== History ==
=== Early years ===
Chinese sojourners were known to have sailed by the Palau islands back to the 18th century. A Chinese junk reportedly sailed anchored at Palau for several days in 1782, and marooned a Malay-Indonesian man. The following August, the British East India Company (EIC) ship Antelope, under the command of Henry Wilson, with sixteen Chinese sailors, wrecked at Ulong Island. The King of Palau sent his second son, Prince Lee Boo, to London, during which he landed on Macau and reportedly encountered curious sights from the townspeople. In 1791, an English lieutenant of the EIC John McCluer established a fort and agricultural colony at Malakal Island and stayed there for several years with some Chinese labourers. After the departure of McCluer and other lieutenants from Palau after 1798, the Chinese labourers settled in Palau.

One Russian explorer, August von Kotzebue reported that Chinese Filipino traders from Manila sailed to Palau and Yap during the early to mid 19th century to sell dragon jars to the islanders. A few Chinese traders settled down and married women from aristocratic families. English businessmen established commercial agriculture enterprises from the 1840s onwards, and often imported Chinese labourers from Southern China to tend to the plantations. Chinese labourers were shipped into Palau from 1909 after phosphate deposits were discovered at Angaur some three years earlier. A few Chinese labourers occasionally led strikes against their German employers for the incessant flogging that they experienced and the poor-working conditions which they reportedly received. In 1914, Japan annexed Palau from Germany, and Chinese labourers were quickly replaced by Japanese and Micronesian labourers.

A few Chinese labourers continued to arrive in Palau in the 1920s. Many of them were deported during the early days of the Japanese military administration, and only accounted for fifteen individuals in a 1923 census They generally received higher wages than the Palauans and immigrant Chamorro labourers, albeit only two-thirds the amount received by their Japanese counterparts. Offspring of Chinese men and Palauan women assimilated into the local community, and were generally identified as Palauans during the Japanese colonial era and in the years when Palau was under American administration.

=== Recent years ===
A few Taiwanese businessmen began to reside in Palau over a long-term basis after Palau established formal diplomatic ties with Taiwan in 1999. Tourists from Taiwan accounted for 10% of all tourist arrivals in Palau, and many Taiwanese businessmen purchased land in the urban areas. Taiwanese businessmen dominate the tourist and corporate sectors of Palau's economy, and have invested in the country's hotels. As reports of Taiwanese dominance in Palau's business sector surfaced, there was occasional talk of resentment among Palauan politicians from 2005 onwards. In 2009, six ethnic Uighurs from the Guantanamo Bay prison were permitted to resettle in Palau, after the United States managed to secure an agreement with Palau to resettle the former prisoners.

== Bibliography ==
- Charity Organization Society of the City of New York, The Survey, Volume 81, Survey Associates, 1945
- Crocombe, R. G., Asia in the Pacific Islands: Replacing the West, 2007, ISBN 982-02-0388-0
- Denoon, Donald; Meleisea, Malama; Firth, Stewart; Linnekin, Jocelyn; Nero, Karen, The Cambridge History of the Pacific Islanders, Cambridge University Press, 2004, ISBN 0-521-00354-7
- Fuentes, Agustín; Wolfe, Linda D., Primates Face to Face: Conservation Implications of Human-nonhuman Primate Interconnections–Volume 29 of Cambridge Studies in Biological and Evolutionary Anthropology, Cambridge University Press, 2002, ISBN 0-521-79109-X
- Glascock, Michael, Geochemical Evidence for Long-distance Exchange: Scientific Archaeology for the Third Millennium, Greenwood Publishing Group, 2002, ISBN 0-89789-869-9
- Hezel, Francis X., Strangers in Their Own Land: A Century of Colonial Rule in the Caroline and Marshall Islands (Issue 13 of Pacific Islands Monograph Ser. 13), University of Hawaii Press, 2003, ISBN 0-8248-2804-6
- Lévesque, Rodrigue, History of Micronesia: Mostly Palau, 1783-1793–Volume 15 of History of Micronesia: A Collection of Source Documents, Lévesque Publications, 2000, ISBN 0-920201-15-6
- Martin, Frederick; Sir John Scott Keltie, Isaac Parker Anderson Renwick, Mortimer Epstein, John Paxton, Sigfrid Henry Steinberg, The Statesman's Year-book, St. Martin's Press, 1923
- Ngiraked, John O., Heritage Belau, Island Horizon Printing, 1999, Island Horizon, 1999
- Pacific Magazine, Volume 30,–Issues 1-6, PacificBasin Communications, 2005
- Parmentier, Richard J., The Sacred Remains: Myth, History, and Polity in Belau, University of Chicago Press, 1987, ISBN 0-226-64695-5
- Peacock, Daniel J., Lee Boo of Belau: A Prince in London, Pacific Islands Studies Program, Center for Asian and Pacific Studies, University of Hawaii, 1987, ISBN 0-8248-1086-4
- Percy, Reuben; Percy, Sholto, The Percy Anecdotes: Original and Select: Volume 15, J. Cumberland, 1826, Princeton University
- Price, Willard, Japan's Islands of Mystery, The John Day Company, 1944
