= 1783 =

1783 in various calendars
- Gregorian calendar: 1783; MDCCLXXXIII
- Ab urbe condita: 2536
- Armenian calendar: 1232; ԹՎ ՌՄԼԲ
- Assyrian calendar: 6533
- Balinese saka calendar: 1704–1705
- Bengali calendar: 1189–1190
- Berber calendar: 2733
- British Regnal year: 23 Geo. 3 – 24 Geo. 3
- Buddhist calendar: 2327
- Burmese calendar: 1145
- Byzantine calendar: 7291–7292
- Chinese calendar: 壬寅年 (Water Tiger); 4480 or 4273 — to — 癸卯年 (Water Rabbit); 4481 or 4274
- Coptic calendar: 1499–1500
- Discordian calendar: 2949
- Ethiopian calendar: 1775–1776
- Hebrew calendar: 5543–5544
- Hindu calendars
- Vikram Samvat: 1839–1840
- Shaka Samvat: 1704–1705
- Kali Yuga: 4883–4884
- Holocene calendar: 11783
- Igbo calendar: 783–784
- Iranian calendar: 1161–1162
- Islamic calendar: 1197–1198
- Japanese calendar: Tenmei 3 (天明３年)
- Javanese calendar: 1708–1710
- Julian calendar: Gregorian minus 11 days
- Korean calendar: 4116
- Minguo calendar: 129 before ROC 民前129年
- Nanakshahi calendar: 315
- Thai solar calendar: 2325–2326
- Tibetan calendar: ཆུ་ཕོ་སྟག་ལོ་ (male Water-Tiger); 1909 or 1528 or 756 — to — ཆུ་མོ་ཡོས་ལོ་ (female Water-Hare); 1910 or 1529 or 757

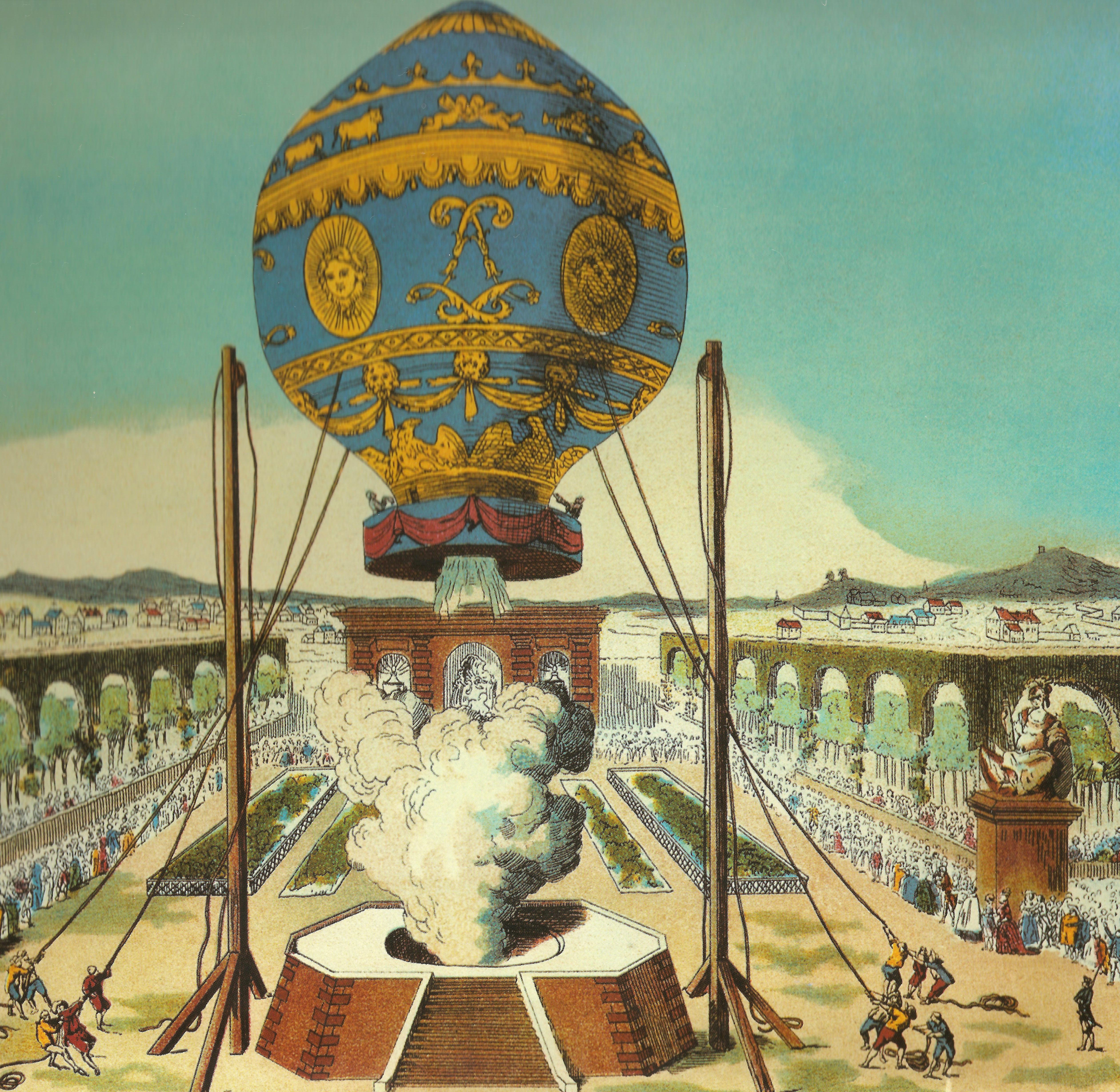
November 21: The first manned hot-air balloon, designed by France's Montgolfier brothers, lifts off from the Bois de Boulogne.

September 3: Great Britain recognizes independence of the American nation, signs Treaty of Paris.

1783 (MDCCLXXXIII) was a common year starting on Wednesday of the Gregorian calendar and a common year starting on Sunday of the Julian calendar, the 1783rd year of the Common Era (CE) and Anno Domini (AD) designations, the 783rd year of the 2nd millennium, the 83rd year of the 18th century, and the 4th year of the 1780s decade. As of the start of 1783, the Gregorian calendar was 11 days ahead of the Julian calendar, which remained in localized use until 1923.

== Events ==
=== January–March ===
- January 20 – At the palace of Versailles, Great Britain signs preliminary peace treaties with the Kingdom of France and the Kingdom of Spain.
- January 23 – The Confederation Congress ratifies two October 8, 1782, treaties signed by the United States with the United Netherlands.
- February 3 – American Revolutionary War: Great Britain acknowledges the independence of the United States of America. At this time, the Spanish government does not grant diplomatic recognition.
- February 4 – American Revolutionary War: Great Britain formally declares that it will cease hostilities with the United States.
- February 5 – 1783 Calabrian earthquakes: The first of a sequence of five earthquakes strikes Calabria, Italy (February 5–7, March 1 & 28), leaving 50,000 dead.
- February 7 – The Great Siege of Gibraltar is abandoned.
- February 26 – The United States Continental Army's Corps of Engineers is disbanded.
- March 5 – The last celebration of Massacre Day is held in Boston, Massachusetts.
- March 15 – Newburgh Conspiracy: A potential uprising in the Continental Army stationed at Newburgh, New York, is defused, when George Washington asks the officers to support the supremacy of the United States Congress.

=== April–June ===
- April – General George Washington sends a letter to the 13 governors of the Confederation of the United States, regarding the needs of the nation.
- April 3 – A Peace and Commercial Treaty is signed between the newly-formed United States and Sweden in Paris, among the first acts of state concluded between the U.S. and a foreign power.
- April 8 – The Crimean Khanate, which has existed since 1441 and is a late remnant of the Mongol Golden Horde, is annexed by the Russian Empire of Catherine the Great.
- April 9–28 – Second Anglo-Mysore War: Siege of Bednore – Tipu Sultan of Mysore with 100,000 troops besieges 1600 British East India Company troops who are obliged to surrender with honours of war.
- April 15 – Preliminary articles of peace ending the American Revolutionary War are ratified by the Congress of the Confederation in the United States.
- April 17 – American Revolutionary War: Colbert's Raid: A Spanish garrison under Captain Jacobo du Breuil defeats British irregulars at Arkansas Post.
- April 18 – Three-Fifths Compromise: The first instance of black slaves in the United States of America being counted as three-fifths of persons (for the purpose of taxation), is included in a resolution of the Congress of the Confederation (this is later adopted in the 1787 Constitution).
- May 13 – The Society of the Cincinnati, a fraternal organization for American veterans of the American Revolution, is formed in Newburgh, New York.
- May 18 – The first United Empire Loyalists, fleeing the new United States, reach Parrtown in Saint John, New Brunswick, Canada.
- May 26 – A Great Jubilee Day, celebrating the end of the American Revolution, is held in Trumbull, Connecticut.
- June 4 or June 5 – The Montgolfier brothers publicly demonstrate their hot air balloon at Annonay, France.
- June 8 – The volcano Laki in Iceland begins an 8-month eruption, starting the chain of natural disasters known as the Móðuharðindin, killing tens of thousands throughout Europe, including up to 33% of Iceland's population, and causing widespread famine. It has been described as one of "the greatest environmental catastrophes in European history".

=== July–September ===
- July 16 – Grants of land in Canada to American Loyalists are announced.
- July 24 – The Treaty of Georgievsk is signed between Imperial Russia and the Kingdom of Kartli-Kakheti, making Georgia a protectorate of Russia.
- August 4 – Mount Asama, the most active volcano in Japan, begins a climactic eruption, killing roughly 1,400 people directly and exacerbating a famine, resulting in another 20,000 deaths (Tenmei eruption).
- August 10 – The British East India Company packet ship Antelope (1781) is wrecked off Ulong Island in the Palau (Pelew) group, resulting in the first sustained European contact with those islands.
- August 18 – The 1783 Great Meteor passes on a 1,000-mile track across the North Sea, Great Britain and France, prompting scientific discussion.
- August 27 – Jacques Charles and Les Frères Robert launch the world's first hydrogen-filled balloon, Le Globe, in Paris.
- August – Robert Burns writes his poem "Now Westlin' Winds" or "Composed in August".
- September 3 – Peace of Paris: A treaty between the United States and Great Britain is signed in Paris, formally ending the American Revolutionary War, in which Britain recognizes the independence of the United States; and treaties are signed between Britain, France, and Spain at Versailles, ending hostilities with the Franco-Spanish Alliance.
- September 9 – Dickinson College is chartered in Carlisle, Pennsylvania.

=== October–December ===
- October 3 – The first Waterford Crystal glassmaking business begins production in Waterford, Ireland.
- October 17 – Mozart's Great Mass is first performed, in Salzburg, Austria.
- November 2 – In Rocky Hill, New Jersey, United States General George Washington gives his Farewell Address to the Army.
- November 3 – The American Continental Army is disbanded as the first act of business by the Confederation Congress, after Thomas Mifflin is elected the new President to succeed Elias Boudinot.
- November 21 – In Paris, Jean-François Pilâtre de Rozier and François Laurent, marquis d'Arlandes, make the first untethered hot air balloon flight (flight time: 25 minutes, Maximum height: 900 m).
- November 24 – In Spain, the Cedula of Population is signed, stating that anyone who will swear fealty to Spain and is of the Roman Catholic faith is welcome to populate Trinidad and Tobago.
- November 25 – American Revolutionary War: The last British troops leave New York City and George Washington triumphantly returns, three months after the signing of the Treaty of Paris.
- November 27 – English rector John Michell concludes that some stars might have enough gravity force to prevent light escaping from them, so he calls them "dark stars".
- November 29 – 1783 New Jersey earthquake: An earthquake of 5.3 magnitude strikes New Jersey.
- December 1 – Jacques Charles and Nicolas-Louis Robert make the first manned flight in a hydrogen-filled gas balloon in Paris.
- December 4 – At Fraunces Tavern in New York City, U.S. General George Washington formally bids his officers farewell.
- December 19 – William Pitt the Younger becomes Prime Minister of Great Britain.

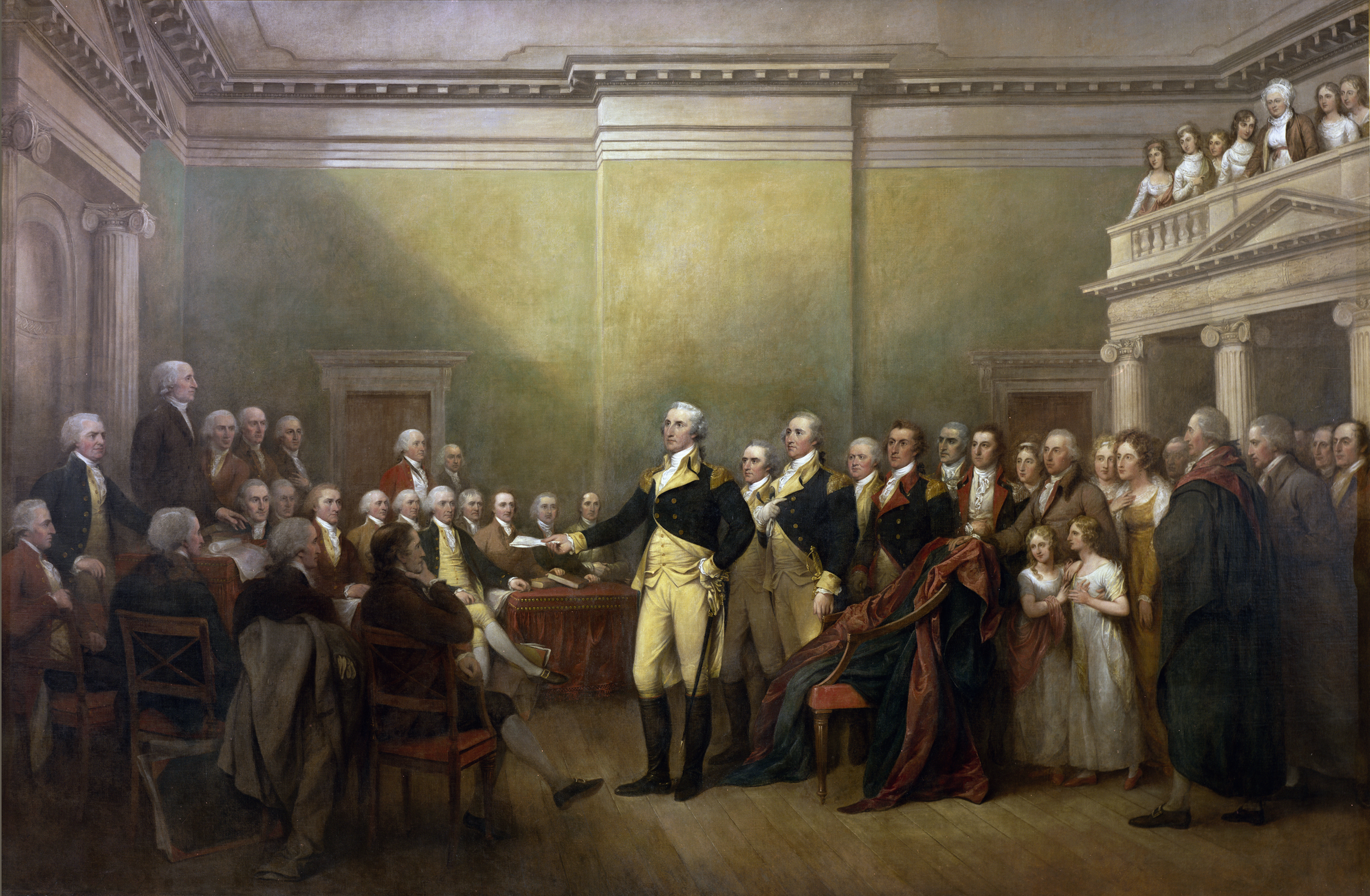
December 23: General George Washington Resigning His Commission

- December 23 – General George Washington resigns his commission as commander-in-chief of the Continental Army to the Congress of the Confederation in the Maryland State House in Annapolis, Maryland, and retires to his home at Mount Vernon. Washington's resignation, described by historian Thomas Fleming as "the most important moment in American history," affirms the United States' commitment to the principle of civilian control of the military, and prompts King George III to call Washington "the greatest character of the age."
- December 31 – Louis-Sébastien Lenormand makes the first ever recorded public demonstration of a parachute descent, by jumping from the tower of the Montpellier Observatory in France, using his rigid-framed model, which he intends as a form of fire escape.

=== Date unknown ===
- Loyalists from New York settle Great Abaco in the Bahamas.
- The city of Sevastopol is founded on the Crimean Peninsula of the Russian Empire, by Rear Admiral Thomas MacKenzie.
- Princess Yekaterina Vorontsova-Dashkova is elected an honorary member of the Royal Swedish Academy of Sciences, the first female foreign member and its second female member, after Eva Ekeblad.
- The Evan Williams (bourbon) distillery is founded in Bardstown, Kentucky.
- Ahmed ibn Muhammad ibn Khalifa, the Emir of Zubarah conquers and rules Bahrain. Shaikh Ahmed restores Arab independence and sovereignty over Bahrain and makes the islands his summer residence.

== Births ==
- January 20 – Friedrich Dotzauer, German cellist, composer (d. 1860)
- January 23 – Stendhal, French writer (d. 1842)
- February 8 – Charles-Marie Denys de Damrémont, French general, governor-general of French Algeria (d. 1837)
- February 16 – Stephen Cassin, United States Navy officer (d. 1857)
- March 8 – Hannah Van Buren, née Hoes, American wife of Martin Van Buren (d. 1819)

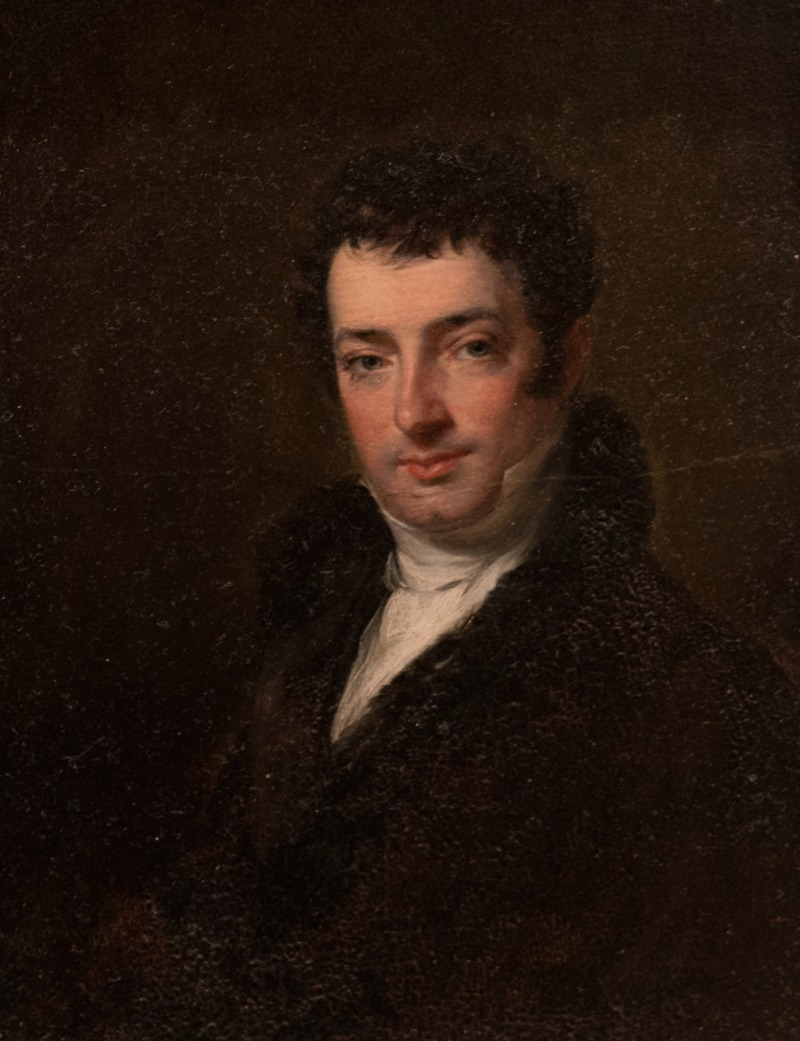
Washington Irving

- April 3 – Washington Irving, American author (d. 1859)
- April 21 – Reginald Heber, English priest (d. 1821)
- May 1 – Vicente Rocafuerte, Ecuadorian politician, 2nd President of Ecuador (d. 1847)
- May 3 – José de la Riva Agüero, Peruvian soldier and politician, 1st President of Peru and 2nd President of North Peru (d. 1858)
- May 25 – Philip P. Barbour, American politician, Associate Justice of the Supreme Court of the United States (d. 1841)

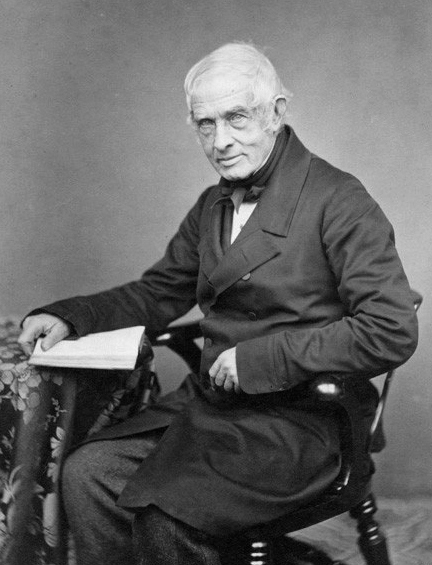
John Crawfurd

- May 27 – John Crawfurd, Scottish physician, colonial administrator, diplomat and author. Last British Resident of Singapore (d. 1868)
- May 29 – Benedetto Pistrucci, Italian engraver and medalist (d. 1855)
- June 19 – Friedrich Sertürner, German pharmacist who discovered morphine in 1804 (d. 1841)
- June 21 – Theodosia Burr Alston, First Lady of South Carolina during War of 1812, daughter of Aaron Burr (d. 1813)

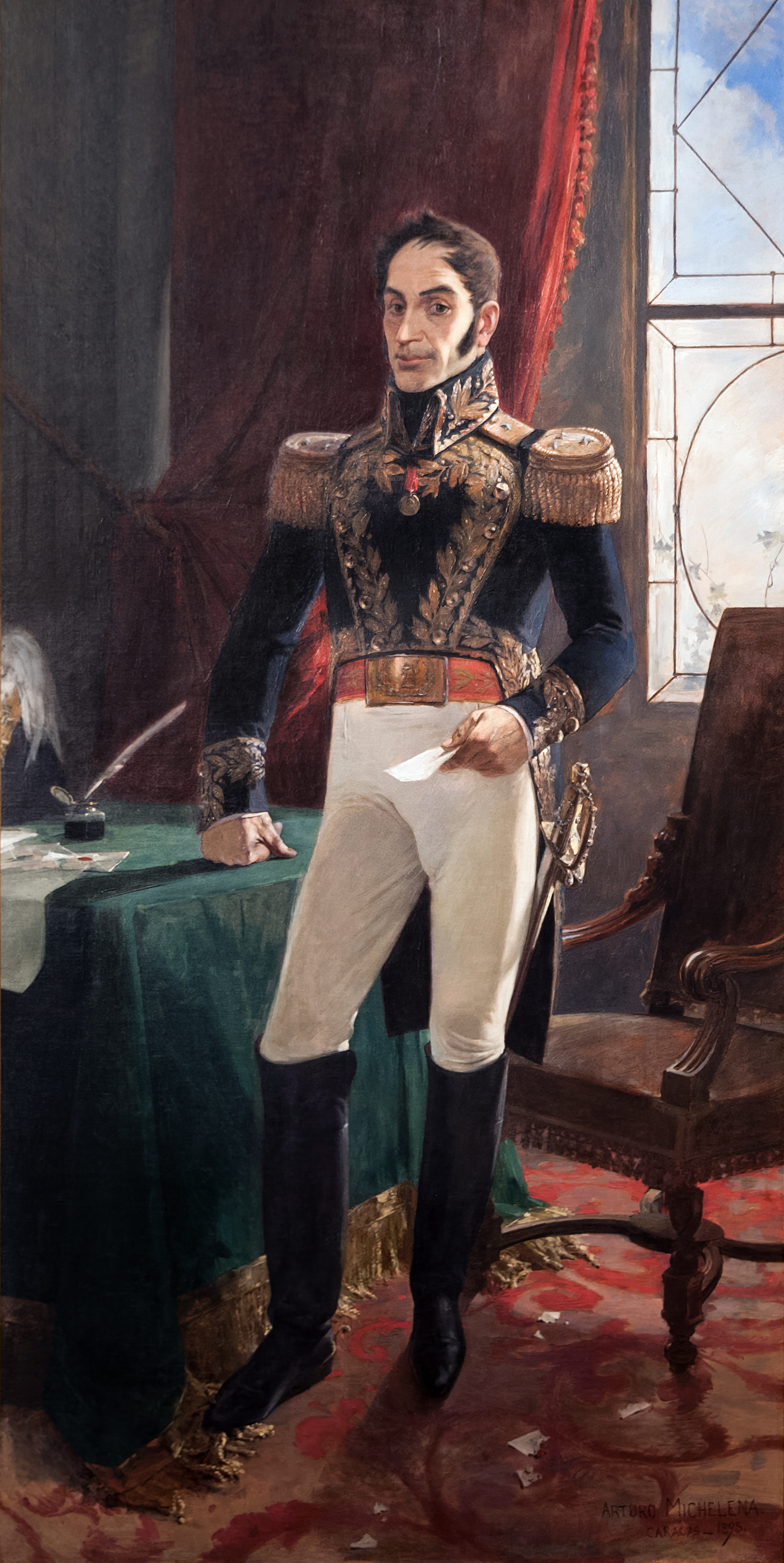
Simón Bolívar

- July 24 – Simón Bolívar, Venezuelan patriot, revolutionary leader and statesman (d. 1830)
- July 28 – Friedrich Wilhelm von Bismarck, German army officer and writer (d. 1860)
- August 7 – Princess Amelia of the United Kingdom, member of the British Royal Family (d. 1810)
- August 26 – Federigo Zuccari, astronomer, director of the Astronomical Observatory of Naples (d. 1817)
- September 17
  - Samuel Prout, English painter (d. 1852)
  - Nadezhda Durova, first female Russian army officer (d. 1866)
- October 31 – Karl Wilhelm Gottlob Kastner, German chemist (d. 1857)
- December 18 – Mary Anne Whitby, English scientist (d. 1850)
- Date unknown – The Two-Headed Boy of Bengal, sufferer from the rare condition Craniopagus parasiticus (d. 1787)

== Deaths ==
- January 2 – Johann Jakob Bodmer, Swiss author (b. 1698)
- January 7 – William Tans'ur, English hymnist (b. 1706)
- January 15 – William Alexander, Lord Stirling, American major-general in the Continental Army during the American Revolutionary War (b. 1726)
- January 18 – Jeanne Quinault, French actress, playwright (b. 1699)
- January 31 – Caffarelli, Italian castrato opera singer (b. 1710)

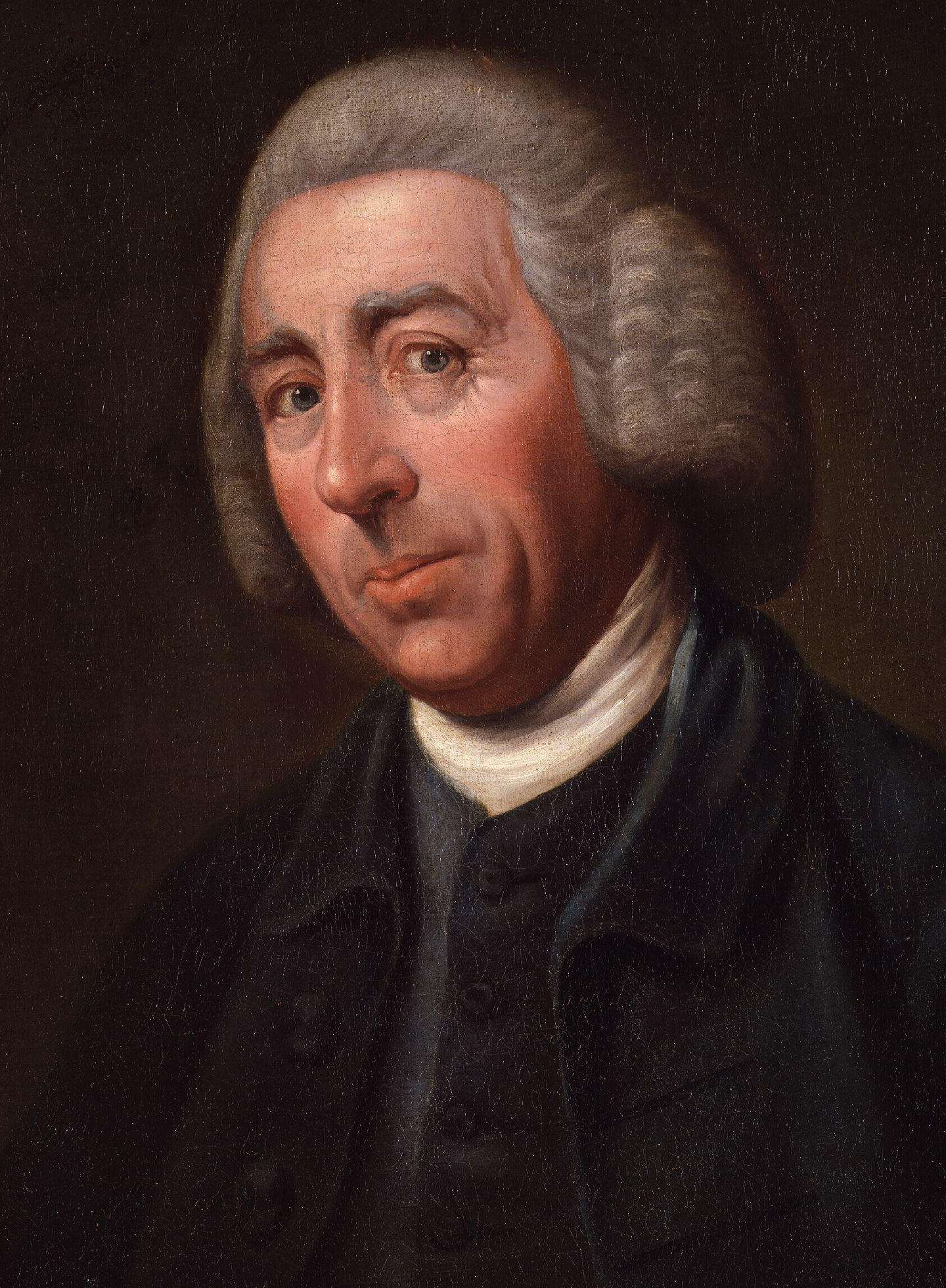
Capability Brown

- February 6 – Capability Brown, English landscape gardener (b. 1716)
- February 10 – James Nares, English composer of mostly sacred vocal works (b. 1715)
- February 15 – Thomas Calcraft, English politician and Lieutenant-Colonel (b. 1738)
- March 2 – Francisco Salzillo, Spanish sculptor (b. 1707)
- March 19 – Frederick Cornwallis, Archbishop of Canterbury (b. 1713)
- March 23 – Charles Carroll, American lawyer, delegate to the Continental Congress (b. 1723)
- March 26 – Anna Rosina de Gasc, German portrait painter (b. 1713)
- March 30 – William Hunter, Scottish anatomist (b. 1718)
- March 31 – Nikita Ivanovich Panin, Russian statesman (b. 1718)
- April 7 – Ignaz Holzbauer, German composer (b. 1711)
- April 16
  - Benedict Joseph Labre, French Catholic saint (b. 1745)
  - Christian Mayer, Czech astronomer (b. 1719)
- May 11 – Juliane Reichardt, German-born Bohemian pianist, singer and composer (b. 1752)
- May 23 – James Otis, American lawyer, patriot (b. 1725)
- June 2 – Charles Spalding, Scottish inventor and underwater diver, killed in diving bell accident (b. 1738)
- August 6 – Adolf Friedrich von Reinhard, jurist and publicist (b. 1726)
- September 14 – James Grenville, British Member of Parliament (b. 1715)

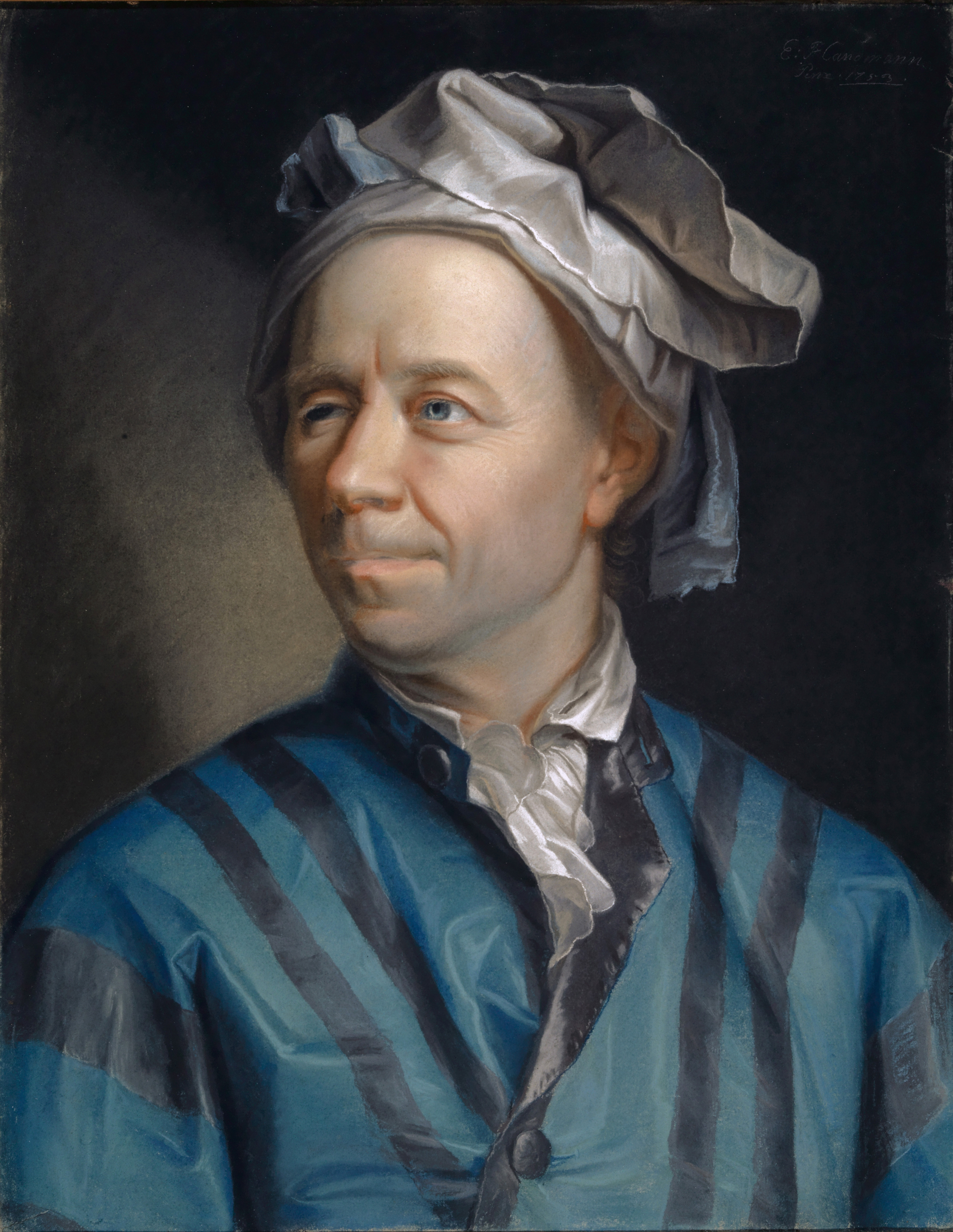
Leonhard Euler

- September 18
  - Leonhard Euler, Swiss mathematician, physicist (b. 1707)
  - Benjamin Kennicott, English churchman, Hebrew scholar (b. 1718)
- September 28 – Marguerite Gourdan, French procurer (b. c. 1730)
- October 2 – Joseph Leeson, 1st Earl of Milltown, Irish politician (b. 1701)
- October 29 – Jean le Rond d'Alembert, French mathematician (b. 1717)
- November 1 – Carl Linnaeus the Younger, Swedish naturalist (b. 1741)
- November 3 – Charles Collé, French dramatist (b. 1709)
- November 15 – John Hanson, American President of the Continental Congress (b. 1721)
- November 23 – Yoriyuki Arima, Japanese mathematician (b. 1714)
- December 13 – Pehr Wilhelm Wargentin, Swedish astronomer (b. 1717)
- December 15 – Ahmad bin Said al-Busaidi, first ruler of Oman of the Al Said dynasty (b. 1710)
- December 16
  - Johann Adolph Hasse, German composer (b. 1699)
  - Sir William James, 1st Baronet, British naval commander (b. 1720)
