= George Keate =

English writer (1729–1797)

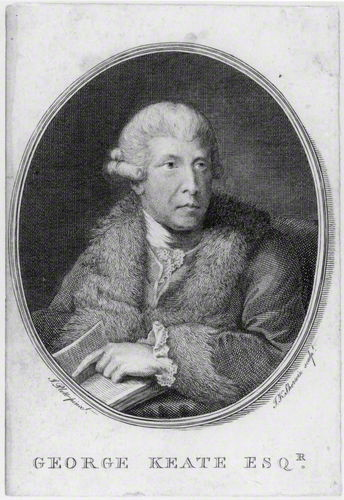
- George Keate, 1781 engraving by John Keyse Sherwin, after John Plott
- Born: 1729; Trowbridge, Wiltshire, England
- Died: 1797 (aged 67–68); Bloomsbury, London
- Occupations: poet and writer

George Keate (1729–1797) was an English poet and writer. He was a versatile author, also known as an artist, who travelled and became a friend of Voltaire.

== Life ==
He was son of George Keate of Isleworth, Middlesex, who married Rachel Kawolski, daughter of Count Christian Kawolski. He was born at Trowbridge in Wiltshire, where his father had property, on 30 November 1729 (according to Daniel Lysons, his baptism was not entered in the Isleworth register until 29 November 1730). Together with Gilbert Wakefield, William Hayley, Francis Maseres, and others, he was educated by the Rev. Richard Wooddeson of Kingston upon Thames.

On leaving school Keate was articled as clerk to Robert Palmer, steward to the Duke of Bedford. He entered the Inner Temple in 1751, was called to the bar in 1753, and made bencher of his inn in 1791, but never practised the law. [The following sentence refers to his grandson listed below in "Family".]In 1850, Henderson inherited his family's money when his mother died. Keate's money came from the dozens of houses that his family owned in Whitechapel. Eight years after his death the income was worth £700 per year.

For some years Keate lived abroad, mainly at Geneva, where he met Voltaire, and in 1755 he was at Rome. After settling in England Keate began to write. He was in turn poet, naturalist, antiquary, and artist. A founder member of the Society of Artists in 1761, he was one of those who left it for the Royal Academy in 1768. He was elected Fellow of the Society of Antiquaries of London and Fellow of the Royal Society in 1766.

Fanny Burney describes Keate in her Early Diary, especially his habit of talking about his own works. Other stories of Keate are in Richard Brinsley Peake's Memoirs of the Colman Family, and Mary Delany in her Autobiography describes visiting his museum in 1779.

During the last few years of life his health visibly declined, and he died suddenly at 10 Charlotte Street, Bloomsbury, on 28 June 1797. He was buried at Isleworth on 6 July, and a white marble monument, with bust by Joseph Nollekens, was placed near the spot where he and his wife, who died 18 March 1800, aged 70, were buried. His specimens of shells were sold by auction after his death. Francis Douce's gift of coins to the Bodleian Library included the collection of Keate.

== Works ==
Keate wrote as an amateur. His works were:

- Ancient and Modern Rome, 1760; an anonymous poem in blank verse, written in 1755.
- Short Account of the Ancient History, present Government and Laws of the Republic of Geneva, 1761; dedicated to Voltaire.
- Epistle [in verse] from Lady Jane Grey to Lord Guildford Dudley, supposed to have been written in the Tower of London a few days before they were executed, 1762.
- The Alps, a Poem, 1763, dedicated to Edward Young.
- Netley Abbey, an Elegy, 1764; 2nd ed. 1769, and often reprinted with John Bullar's Visit to Netley Abbey.
- The Temple Student, an Epistle to a Friend, 1765.
- Poem to the Memory of the celebrated Mrs. Cibber, 1766, anonymous; for Susannah Maria Cibber.
- Ferney; an Epistle to Voltaire, 1768. In praise of Voltaire and his works, but with compliments to Shakespeare, for which the author was rewarded, in the jubilee year 1769, by the mayor and corporation of Stratford-upon-Avon, with an ink-stand made out of a mulberry-tree planted by Shakespeare, and with the freedom of the town.
- The Monument in Arcadia, a dramatic poem in two acts, 1773; suggested by Nicolas Poussin's picture Les Bergers d'Arcadie of shepherds and shepherdesses contemplating a monument with the words Et in Arcadia ego; used by Christian Felix Weiße for a libretto to a lost opera by Johann Adam Hiller.
- Sketches from Nature, taken and coloured in a Journey to Margate, 1779, 2 vols.; an imitation of Laurence Sterne, which passed through several editions, and was translated into French.
- Poetical Works, 1781, 2 vols.; they were dedicated to Dr. William Heberden, and included all his published poems, with many additions, the main being one canto of the Helvetiad, written at Geneva in 1756, and intended for a description of the revolution in Switzerland in the fourteenth century. He was dissuaded by Voltaire from completing it.
- Epistle to Angelica Kauffman, 1781.
- The Distressed Poet, a Serio-comic Poem, 1787; describing his troubles through a protracted suit at common law with his architect, Robert Adam.

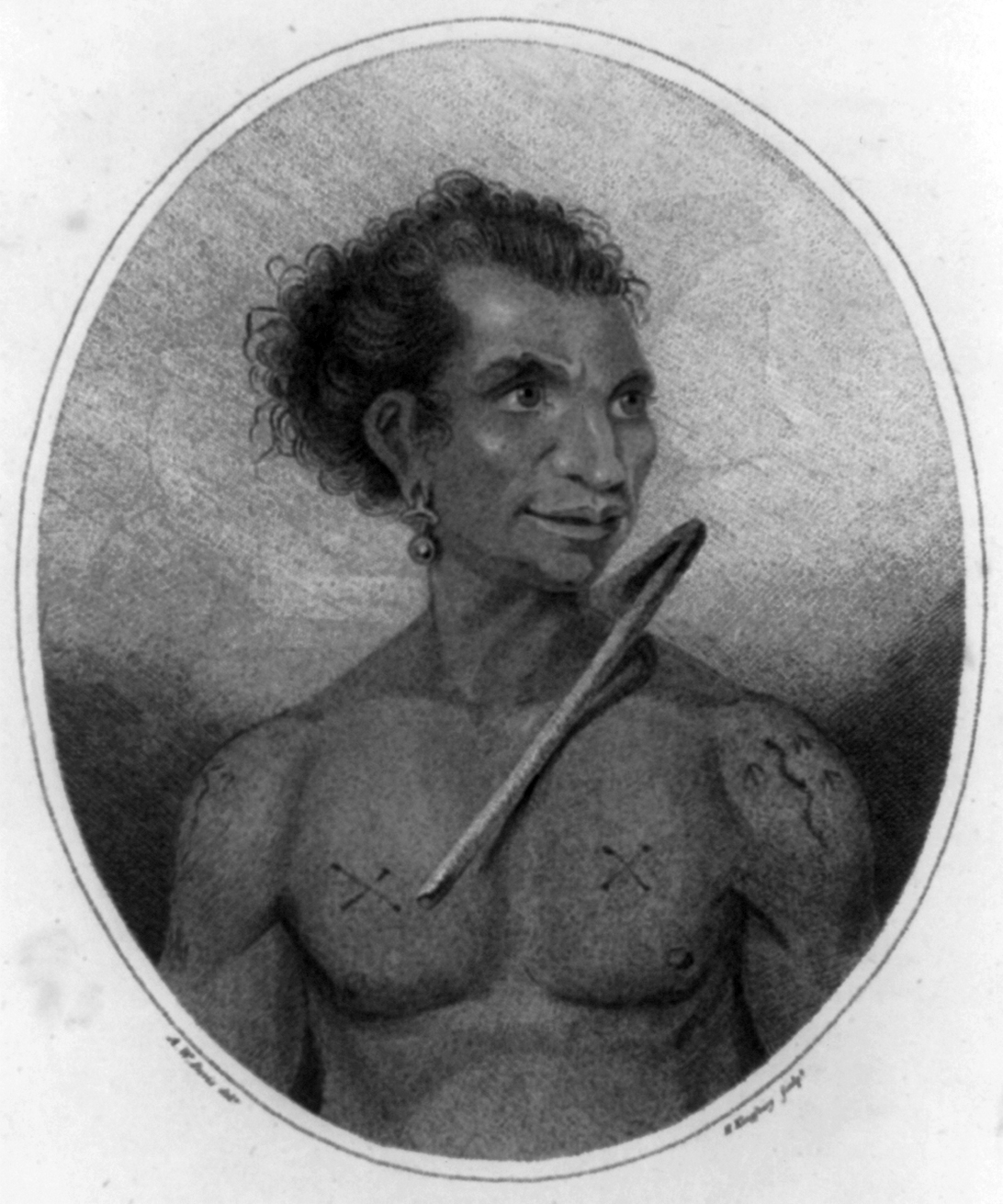
Engraving of the ibedul of Palau, called inaccurately King Abba Thulle, from Keate's Account of the Pelew Islands, after Arthur William Devis.

- Account of the Pelew Islands, from the Journals of Captain Henry Wilson and some of his officers, shipwrecked there in the Antelope in August 1783, 1788. This work was based on the account of Henry Wilson. It was often reprinted (with a supplement by John Pearce Hockin in 1803), including in an abridged version, and was translated into French (1793) and German (1800). The French translation has been attributed to Mirabeau.

Some of Keate's poems are in George Pearch's Collection, iii. 269–74; and he wrote prologues and epilogues for the dramatic representations at Newcome's School in Hackney, besides adapting Voltaire's Sémiramis for the stage. Keate also contributed "Observations on some Roman Earthenware" to Archæologia. vi. 125–9.

Between 1766 and 1789 Keate exhibited six pictures at the Society of Artists and thirty at the Royal Academy. His correspondence with Voltaire and Edward Young went to the British Museum and are now part of the British Library collections (Add MSS 30991–30992).

== Family ==
Keate married in February 1769 Jane Catharine, daughter of Joseph Hudson, who had been Dutch consul at Tunis, and only sister of Sir Charles Grave Hudson, bart., of Wanlip, Leicestershire. Their issue was one daughter, Georgiana Jane Keate afterwards Mrs. Henderson (1770–1850), who exhibited four pictures at the Society of Artists in 1791, and painted from memory a portrait of Prince Lee Boo, fifteen months after his death, for her father's account of the Pelew islands. She married, on 9 June 1796, John Henderson, B.C.L. (1764–1843), of Adelphi Terrace, London, one of the early patrons of Thomas Girtin and J. M. W. Turner, and himself an amateur artist. Their children were Charles Cooper Henderson, John Henderson, and three daughters, who died unmarried. There are portraits of the mother by Angelica Kauffman and John Russell, R.A. She died 8 January 1850, and was buried in her husband's grave at Kensal Green Cemetery.
