= Georgiana Keate =

Georgiana Henderson
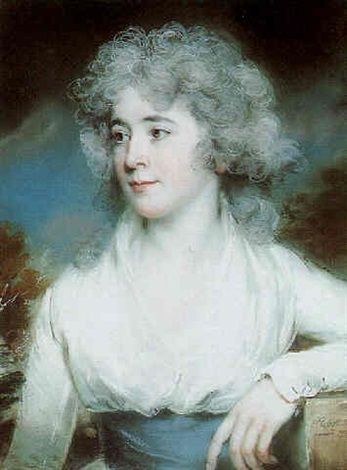
- by John Russell, R.A.
- Born: Georgiana Keate; 1771 (probably)
- Died: 8 January 1850
- Known for: painting
- Spouse: John Henderson

Georgiana Jane Henderson or Georgiana Keate (1771 (probably) – 8 January 1850) was an English painter. She sat for two noted portraits and was the daughter and mother of other noted artists.

== Life ==
Keate is thought to have been born in 1771 but it is not certain. Her father was George Keate and her mother was Jane Catharine (born Hudson) and her uncle was Sir Charles Grave Hudson, bart.

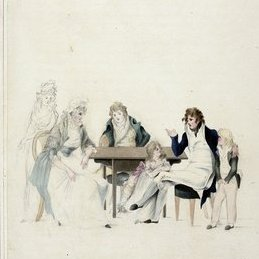
The Return. Watercolour by Georgiana Keate c.1785

In 1785 she painted "Mr Biggin and Mrs Sage ascending from St Georges Fields in Lunardis Balloon 29 June 1785" which records a balloon flight. The picture is now held by the Royal Astronomical Society.

She met Prince Lee Boo who had come from what was then called the Pelew Islands. He died from smallpox. Her father decided to write his story An Account of the Pelew Islands... Georgiana recreated his portrait fifteen months after his death. This portrait was the basis of Henry Kingsbury's engraving in the National Portrait Gallery.

She exhibited four pictures at the Society of Artists in 1791. She married, on 9 June 1796, John Henderson. Her husband was an amateur artist and he was a patron of Thomas Girtin and J. M. W. Turner.

They had five children who included the artist Charles Cooper Henderson who was known for painting coaches and John Henderson who curated important private collections, and three daughters.

There is a portrait of Keate as "a young girl" by Angelica Kauffman who took an interest in Keate's skills.

John Russell, R.A. painted her in 1795.

She died 8 January 1850, and was buried in her husband's grave at Kensal Green Cemetery.
