= Anne Russell =

Anne Russell may refer to:

- Anne Russell, Countess of Bedford (1615–1684), wealthy English noblewoman
- Anne Russell, Countess of Warwick (1548/49–1604), English noblewoman and lady-in-waiting
- Anne Russell, Duchess of Bedford (c. 1705–1762)
- Anne Russell (judge) (born 1940), Canadian judge
- Anne Russell (artist) (1781–1857), British artist

== See also ==
- Annie Russell (1864–1936), British-American stage actress
- Anna Russell (1911–2006), English–Canadian singer and comedian
