= Charles Cooper Henderson =

British painter of coaches

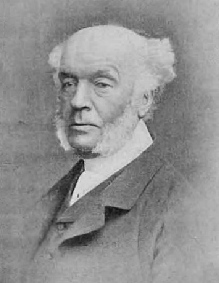
- Charles Cooper Henderson
- Born: 14 June 1803; Abbey House, Chertsey, Surrey, England
- Died: 21 August 1877 (aged 74); Lower Halliford, England
- Known for: Painting horses

Charles Cooper Henderson (14 June 1803 – 21 August 1877) was a British painter of horses and coaches.

== Life ==
Henderson was born in Abbey House, Chertsey, Surrey to John Henderson and Georgiana Jane (born Keate). His maternal grandfather was George Keate and his elder brother was John Henderson, the antiquary and benefactor of the British Museum. He was sent to Winchester School and then studied to be a lawyer. His father was an amateur artist and patron and his mother had exhibited four of her paintings in 1791. Henderson trained under Samuel Prout.

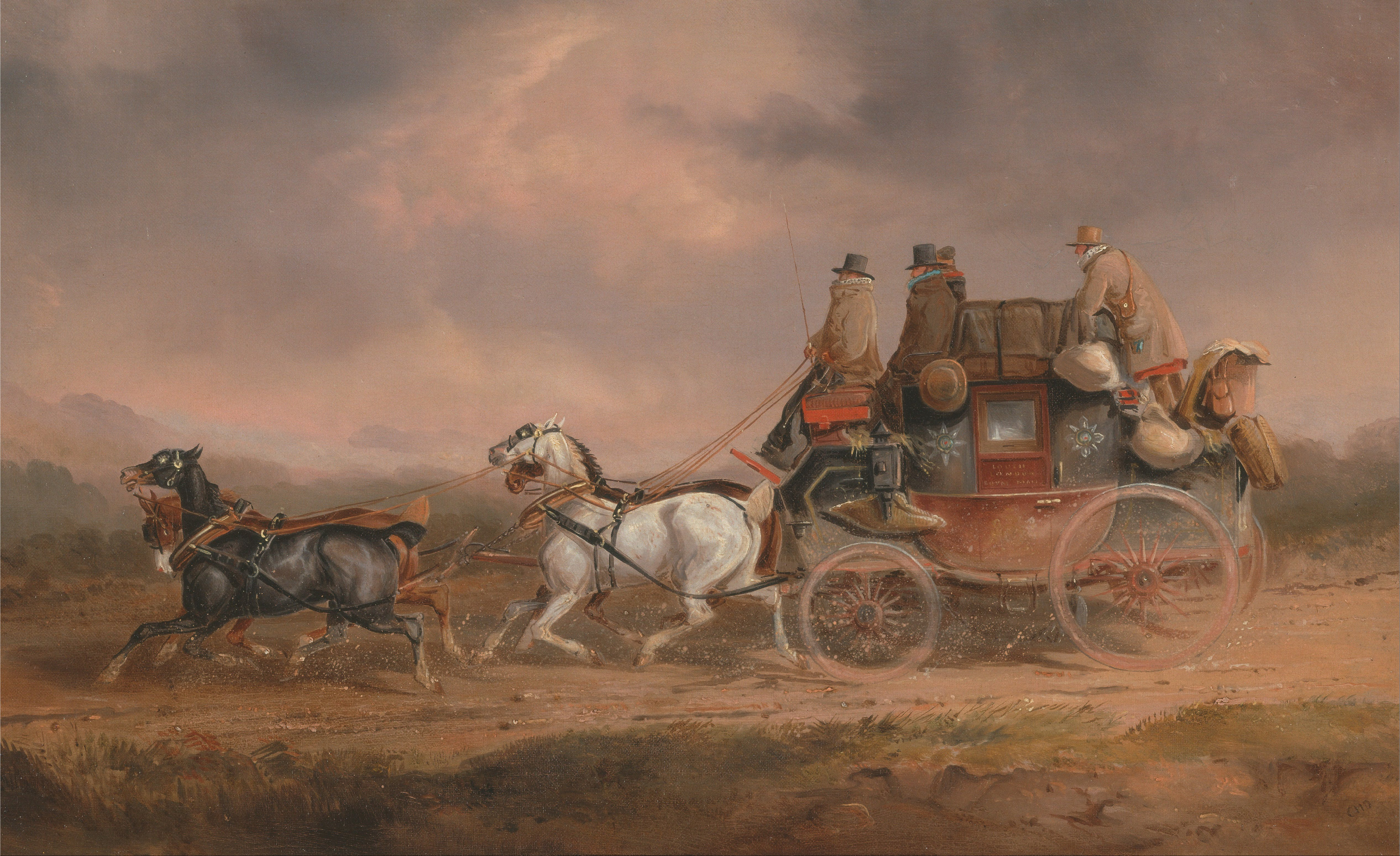
Mail Coaches on the Road: The Louth-London Royal Mail progressing at Speed by Henderson

Henderson was estranged from his father after he married a young girl called Charlotte By in 1828. They were to have nine children together and seven of these were boys. Their children were Charles Cooper (the younger), John Keate Shepard, Charlotte (the younger), Kennart Gregg, Robert, Mary, Roderick William, George By and Henry Cooper Henderson. They all lived out of their infancy but Robert died whilst still a child. Henderson had just two paintings exhibited at the Royal Academy, both in the 1840s.

In 1850, Henderson inherited his family's money when his mother died. His mother's money had come from George Keate. In 1805 his mother and father were failing to maintain 250 dilapidated houses in Whitechapel, but they were still receiving £700 in income. He also came into money from his wife's family who had land in Canada. With no worries about his income, Henderson took the opportunity to give his energies to painting. In 1877 Henderson died a widower at his home, 3 Lamb's Conduit Place, London, on 21 August 1877.

== Legacy ==
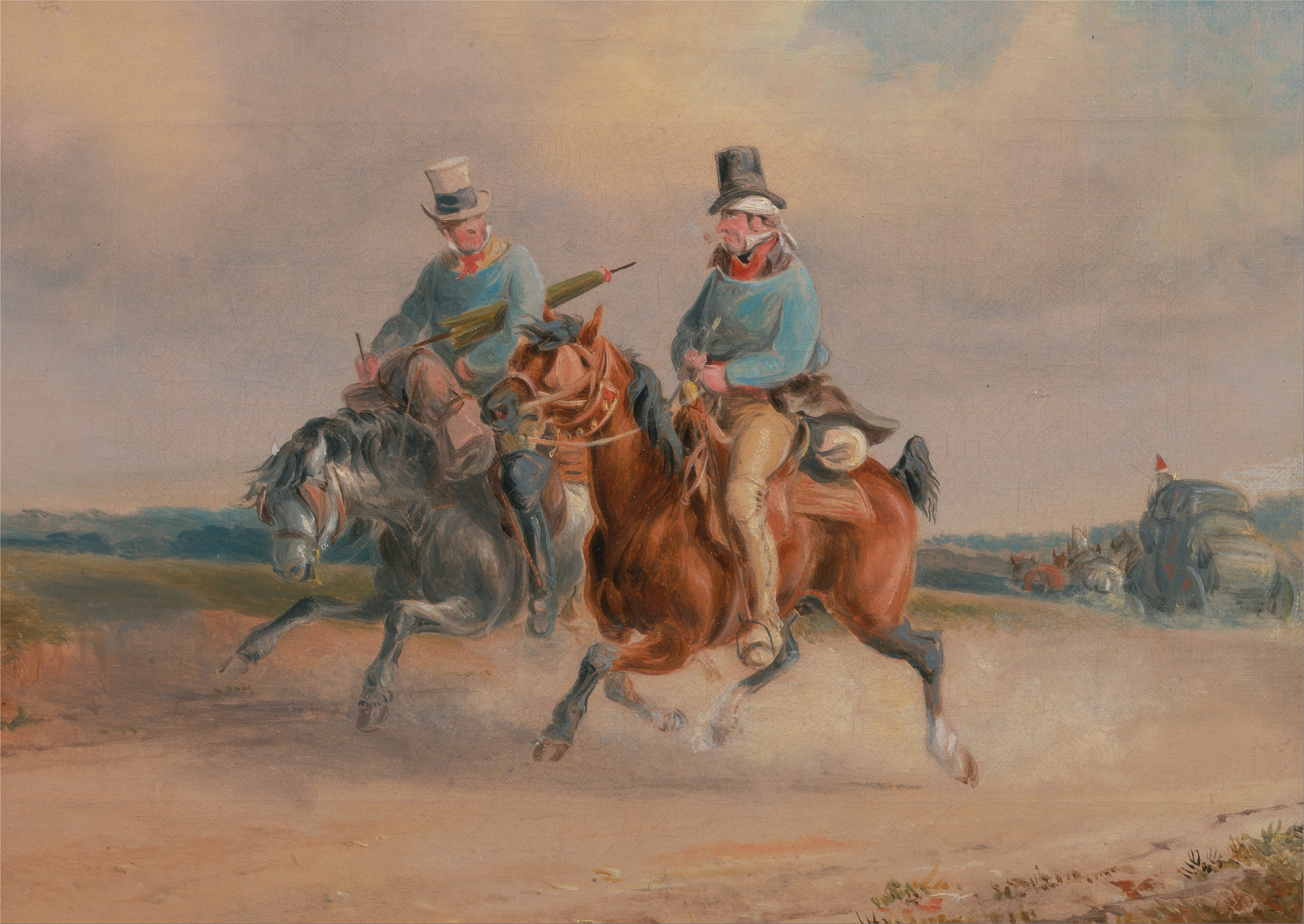
A Scene on the Road in France

The poorly maintained houses in Whitechapel that maintained the Henderson family were bringing in four pence per room per night where they were common lodging houses in the year that Henderson died. Eleven years later it was this area that became notorious in its association with Jack the Ripper. Many of Henderson's paintings were engraved by himself and others such as Henry A. Papprill, John Harris, and the renowned Samuel William Fores.

Prints of his coaching scenes are valued and collected. The “Fores’s Coaching Recollections” were originally engraved from Henderson paintings in 1842-43 and continued to be republished during the 19th century. In the series numbered Plates I-VI, “Changing Horses”, “All Right”, “Pulling Up To Un-Skid”, “Waking Up”, “The Olden Time”, “The Night Team”, the first five were engraved by John Harris, the sixth by Henry A Papprill. Examples as large format aquatints can be seen in the UK Government Art Collection and have been found at auction in 2006, 2008, 2014. He has original paintings in several public collections in Dublin and in the UK. Henderson was buried in Kensal Green Cemetery and he has a memorial at St Nicholas's Church in Shepperton.
