= Jane Russell (painter) =

British artist (1779–1810)

Jane de Courcy Russell (1779–1810) was an English pastellist.

Born in London, Russell was the daughter of painter John Russell; her siblings William, Anne, and Maria also became artists. She married Joshua Jowett (1776–1845), a “furnishing ironmonger & brazier”, in 1802, two years before he patented a fire-guard stove. She died in Kentish Town.
