= Henry A. Papprill =

British engraver

Henry A. Papprill (1816–1903) was a British engraver.

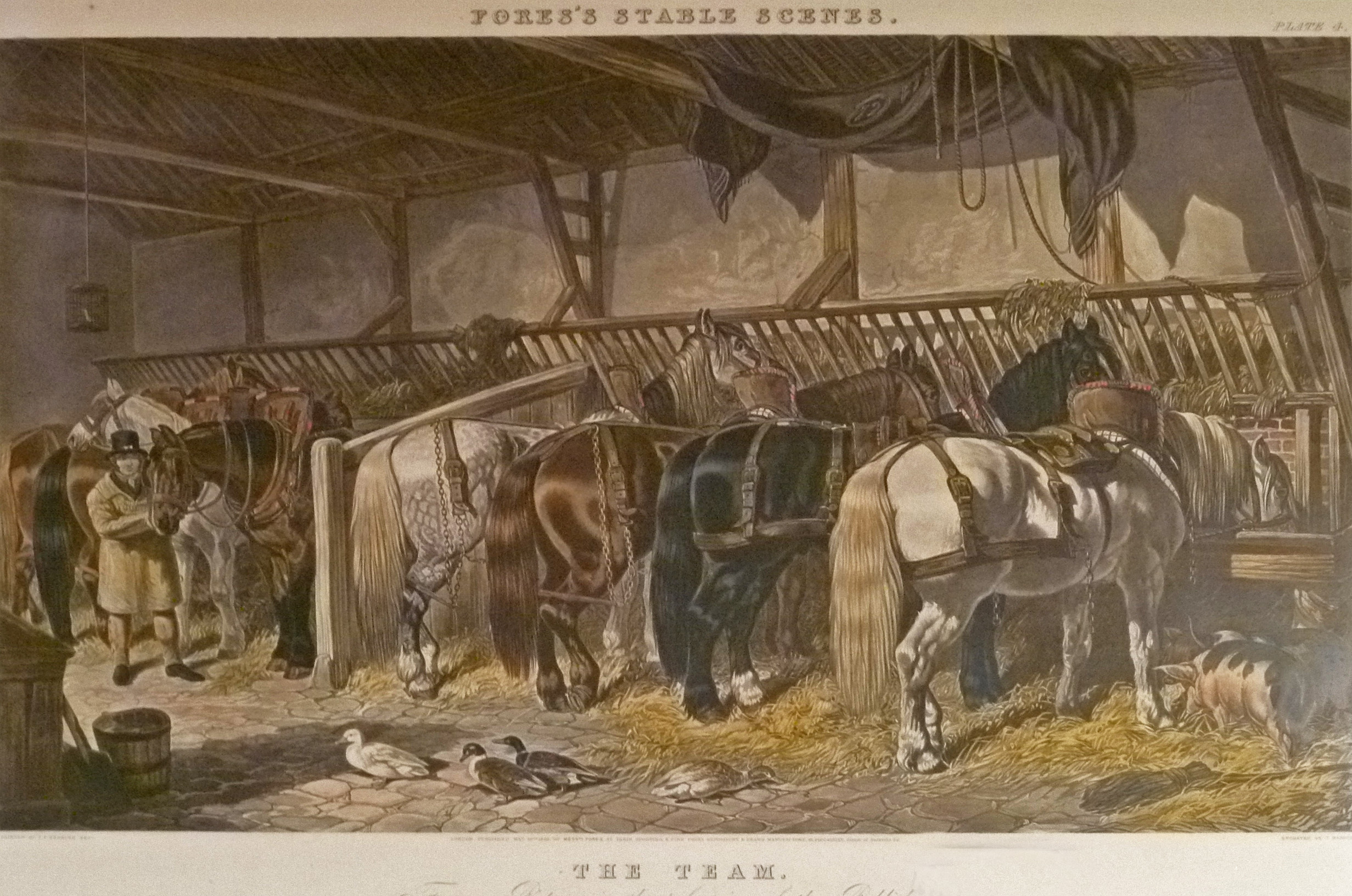
"The Team" (1875)

Noted as an aquatint engraver from 1840. His plates were published from 1840 till 1883 mainly by Ackermann of the Strand.

Papprill was born in Holborn, London. Lived for much of his life at Wharton Street, Lloyd Square, London. Papprill is thought to have been based in New York City for brief period in the mid-1840s. His work in the USA appears to classify him as an American engraver but he was based and gained his reputation and bulk of his work in England.

He produced a series of works for Ackermann & Co from 1840 beginning with four plates called "The Jolly Squire", with verses, after James Pollard.

In the following years Papprill engraved a number of military plates for Ackermann as well a series of engravings of New York (1846-9) for H.I.Megarey (published in New York). The most notable of these are: "The North West Angle of Fort Columbus, Governor's Island" (the Catherwood-Papprill view) and New York from the Steeple of St. Paul's Church, Looking East, South & West." (The Hill-Papprill view) listed in the American Historical Prints - Early Views of American Cities, etc: I.N.Phelps Stokes & Daniel C. Haskell. New York Public Library 1932.

Papprill also produced for Ackermann a series of sporting prints after G. H. Laporte between 1860 and 1865. These were entitled: Racing, Hunting and Coursing. He also produced a series of shipping prints "Outward Bound" and "Homeward Bound" (Liverpool) as well as a series showing famous military vessels.

Other engravings by Papprill appear in Hong Kong showing naval scenes in the harbour there circa 1860. These engravings form part of the exhibition celebrating Hong Kong's return to China 1997.

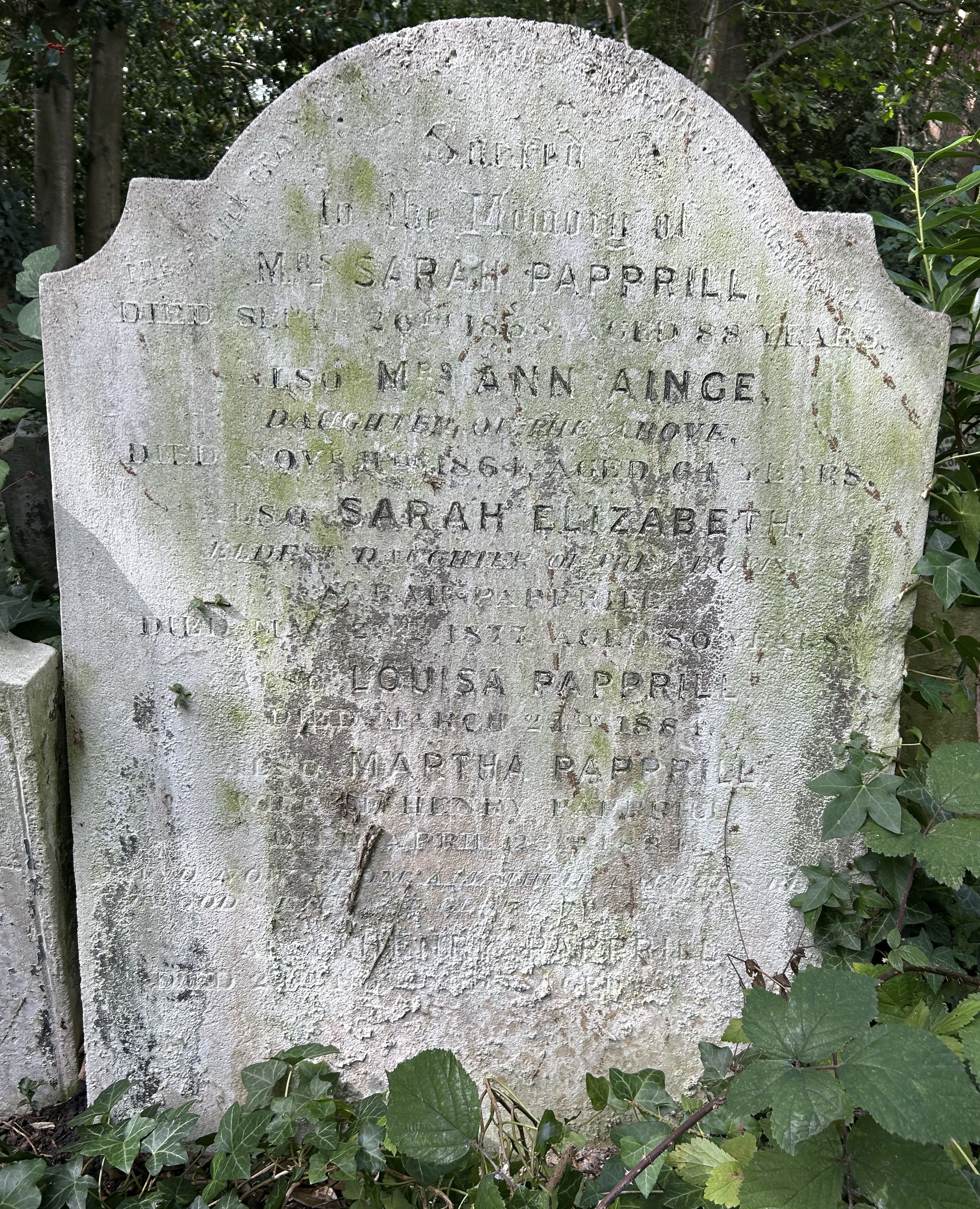
Grave of Henry Papprill in Highgate Cemetery

From 1867 Papprill was engraving for Samuel William Fores of Piccadilly. His first plates were a pair for the Fores Coaching series after W.J.Shayer: "Up Hill, Springing 'Em" and "Down Hill, The Skid". In 1874 Papprill aquatinted the five original scenes of "Fores's Coaching Recollections" - "Changing Horses", "All Right" and "The Olden Times" which had been engraved in the 1840s by John Harris after equestrian painter Charles Cooper Henderson. (Harris engraved six scenes originally.) These were followed with a series of Stable Scenes: "Mail Change", "Hunting Stud" and "The Team" in 1875.

In 1878 Papprill engraved Fores's "Hunting Incidents" after William Hopkins.

Papprill's last works are assumed to be the 1883 plate VI of Fores's Coaching Recollections: "The Night Team" and the 1885 plate: "The First Day of the Season. He died in 1903 and is buried on the western side of Highgate Cemetery.

== Works ==
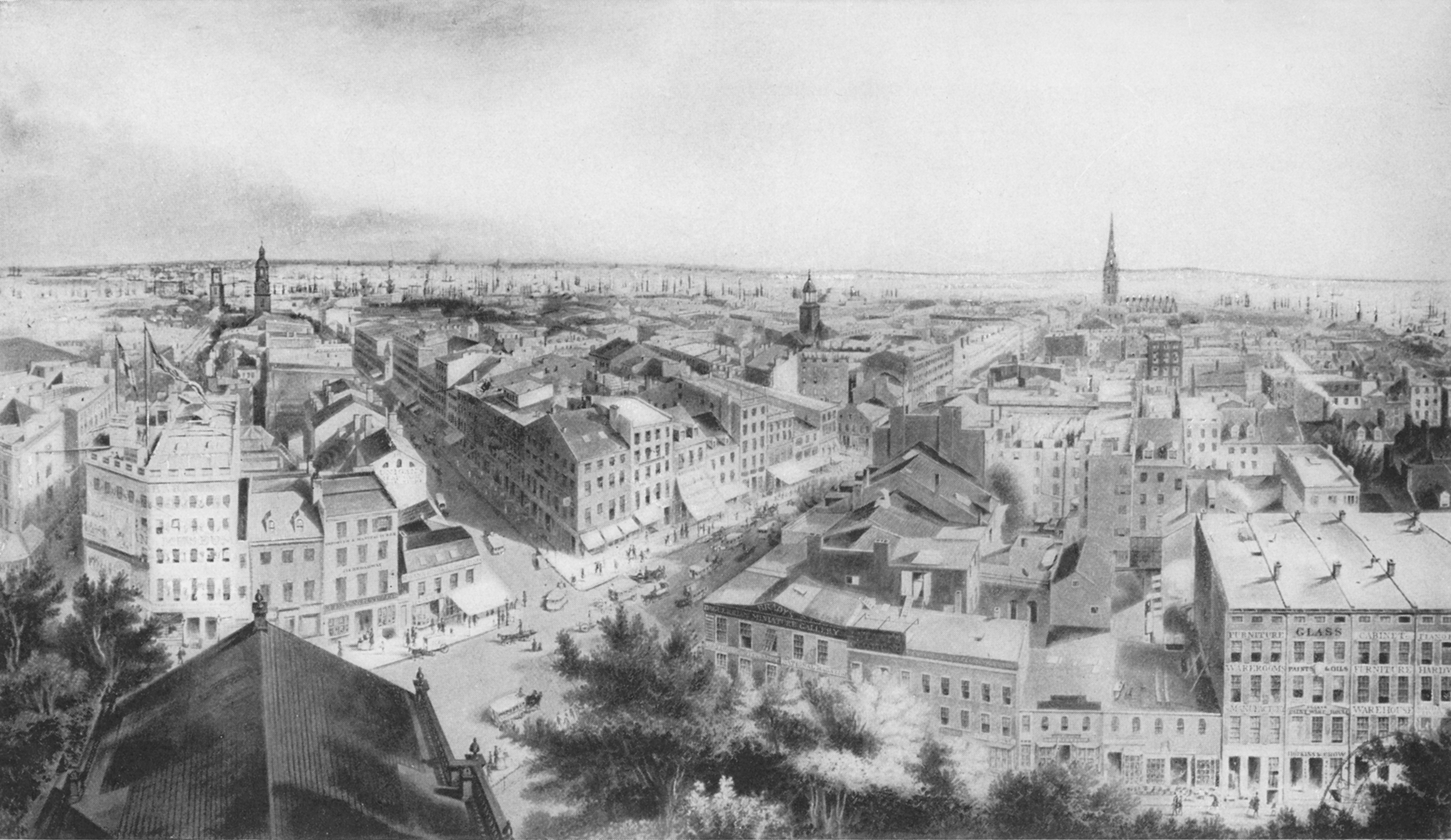
New York City in 1854 by Henry Papprill

Henry A. Papprill's engravings include:

- 1820 - Portrait of Mr. Thos. George of Henley and his Mare. Nov.1820.
- 1830 - The Chart of British Liveries
- 1840 - The Jolly Squire - with verse. (four prints)
- 1845 - Coaching - Uphill & Downhill (Ackermann) reissued by Fores in 1867.
- 1846 - New York Views
- 1854 - Hunting (two prints )
- 1860 - Racing - The Start & Winning.
- 1865 - Coursing - In the Slips & The First Turn.
- 1874 - Fores's Coaching Recollections Plates I to V.
- 1878 - Fores's Hunting Incidents.
- 1883 - "The Night Mail"
- 1885 - "The First Day of the Season"
