= John Henderson (collector) =

English art collector (1797–1878)

John Henderson (1797–1878) was an English collector of works of art. He bequeathed his important collection to the British Museum, the National Gallery and the University of Oxford.

== Life ==
Born in Adelphi Terrace, London, he was son of John Henderson and Georgiana Jane, only child of George Keate, F.R.S. His father, an amateur artist, was an early patron of Thomas Girtin and J. M. W. Turner, who frequently worked together in his house. His father's income was from rents on 250 poor houses in Whitechapel. In 1805 Henderson's mother and father were receiving £700 in income per annum. Charles Cooper Henderson was his brother.

John Henderson the younger went at the age of sixteen as a fellow-commoner to Balliol College, Oxford (B.A. 1817 and M.A. 1820). He read for the bar, but devoted his life to the study of archæology and the collection of works of art.

His collections were kept at his house, 3 Montague Street, Bloomsbury. He was a fellow of the Society of Antiquaries and other societies, and a contributor to their proceedings. He died unmarried in 1878.

== Legacy ==
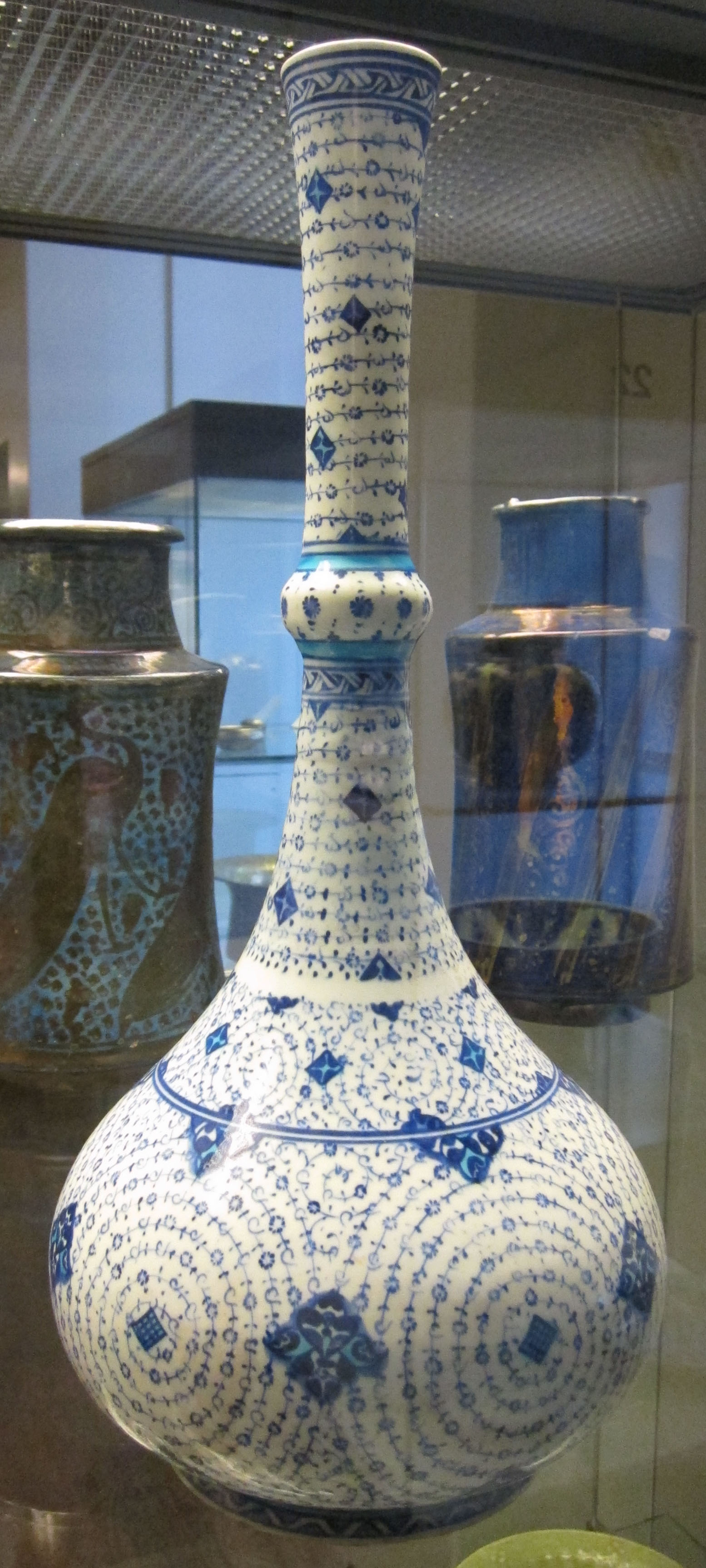
Iznik water bottle, part of Henderson's bequest to the British Museum.

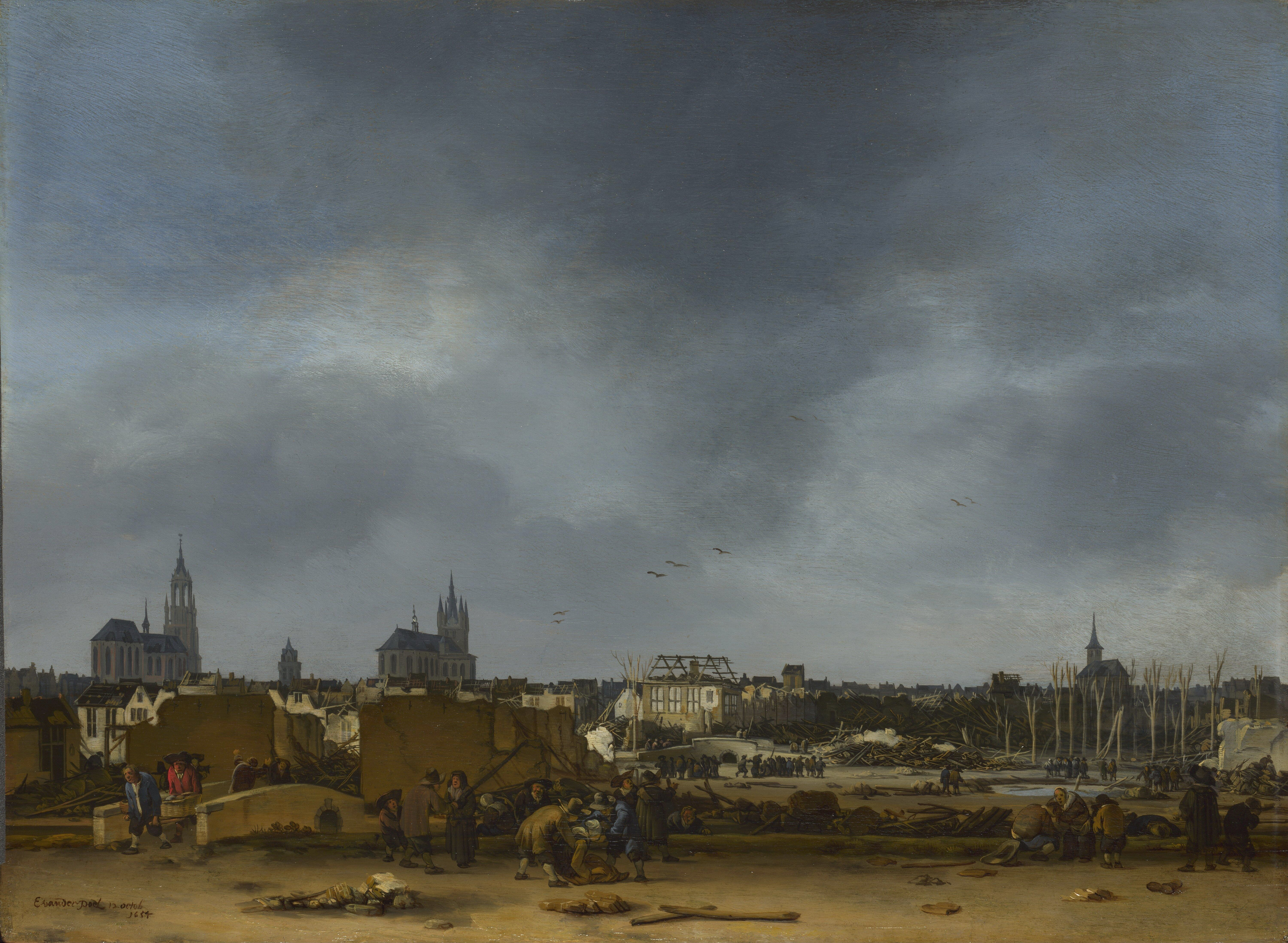
Egbert van der Poel, A View of Delft after the Explosion of 1654, left by Henderson to the National Gallery in London.

By the codicil to his will, dated 1 November 1877, Henderson bequeathed to the University of Oxford his Greek and Roman vases and Egyptian antiquities. To the trustees of the British Museum went:

- his collection of water-colour drawings by Canaletto, Turner, Girtin, John Robert Cozens, David Cox, and William James Müller (now in the print room)
- his collection of Russian silver and enamels
- his Damascus, Persian, Rhodian, and majolica porcelain and pottery
- oriental and Venetian metal-work, and oriental arms
- Roman, Greek, and Venetian glass
- and the correspondence of his grandfather, George Keate, with Voltaire and Dr. Edward Young (now British Library Add MSS 30991–30992).

To the trustees of the National Gallery he bequeathed his water-colour drawings by George Cattermole and Peter De Wint, two pictures by A. Canaletto, and any others of his old masters which they might select.
