= Henry Wilson (sailor) =

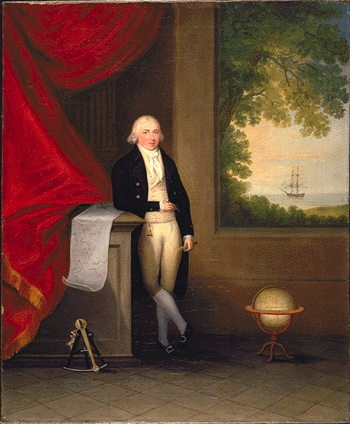
1782 portrait of Wilson by Arthur William Devis

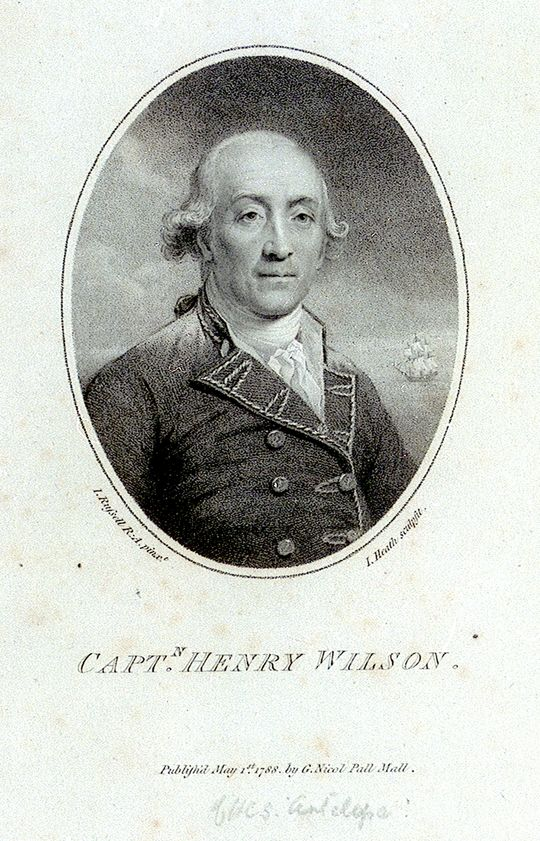
1788 engraving of Wilson by James Heath after a John Russell portrait

Captain Henry Wilson (1740 – 10 May 1810) was a British sea captain from Rotherhithe. He commanded the East India Company packet ship Antelope, when it shipwrecked off Ulong Island in 1783. Wilson also captained the East Indiaman Warley at the Battle of Pulo Aura.

== Voyage of 1783 ==
During the Fourth Anglo-Dutch War, normal routes from China westwards for British shipping were hampered by the Dutch East Indies. The Antelope had been returning from Macau by the "Eastern Passage", a route designed to avoid the south-west monsoon, but had strayed too far in the easterly direction.

On the north coast of New Guinea Wilson anchored in the vicinity of the Schouten Islands. After some dialogue over two days with Papuan inhabitants who came out to the ship, in which Wilson used vocabulary collected by Thomas Forrest at Dory Harbour, Wilson felt the numbers he faced were threatening. He used small arms to deter them, and the crew of the Antelope was attacked, an encounter in which the artist Arthur William Devis was injured. The wreck on Ulong followed.

Although Spain had claimed the islands previously, Wilson's crew made the first sustained contact, which was friendly. One of the crew of the Antelope knew Malay, allowing contact to be made with the ibedul on Koror, whom Wilson treated as a local king, somewhat misapprehending his status, which was more like an elected official. While his men spent three months rebuilding the ship, Wilson entered an effective alliance with the ibedul in conflicts with Melekeok and others. One of the Antelope's guns proved decisive, shipped in a boat and discharged with powder alone.

== Return to England ==
Prince Lee Boo from Palau returned to England with Wilson and lived with his family in Rotherhithe. Unfortunately, after a few months he died of smallpox in 1784. Much interest in Palau followed. Wilson's collection of curiosities, that were exchanged with the ibedul and form the earliest known group of Palau artefacts, are held by the British Museum. George Keate wrote an account of Wilson's experiences in 1788, a book heavily influenced by the current conceptions concerning the "noble savage". The book became quite popular. "Between 1789 and 1850, more than 20 English and a dozen foreign-language editions were published in different countries." The East India Company turned attention from Mindanao as a possible outpost to the New Guinea archipelago, and John McCluer went from Bombay to Palau in 1790 as hydrographer.

== Later life ==
Later Wilson was captain of the East Indiaman Warley for five voyages. He was captain in 1804 at the Battle of Pulo Aura when a fleet of East Indiamen under Nathaniel Dance fought and bluffed a French squadron. Wilson died on 10 May 1810 at his home in Colyton, Devon.
