= Abba Thulle =

18th century paramount chief of Koror

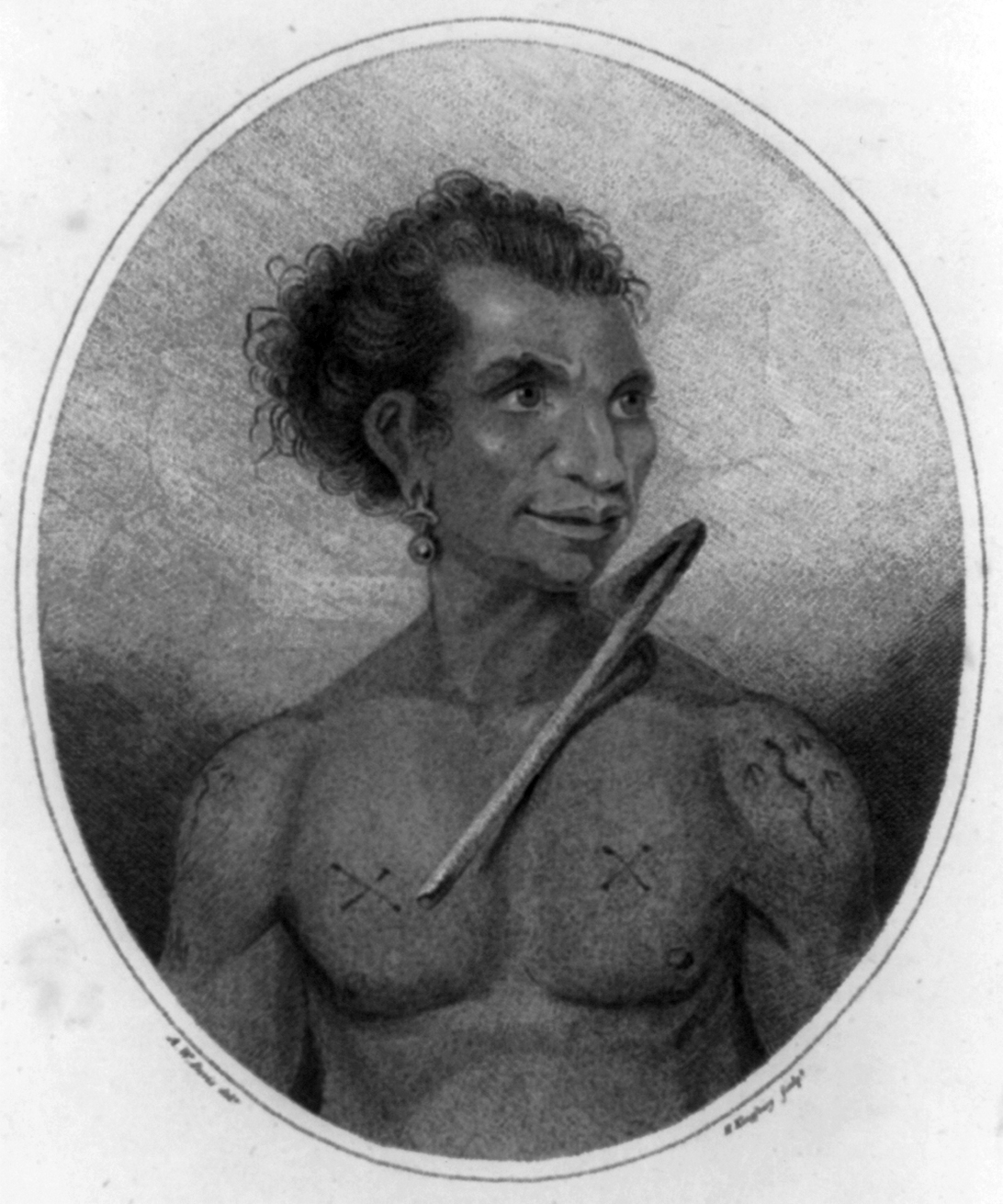
by Henry Kingsbury after Arthur William Devis

Abba Thulle (Note: Abba Thulle is the English transcription of the title "Ibedul". Some sources spell it Abba Thule.) was the ibedul, 'paramount chief' (Note: Erroneously referred to as king.) of Koror whom the sailor Henry Wilson and his crew met on their voyage to Palau in 1783. His second son Prince Lee Boo became one of the first people from the Pacific Islands to visit Great Britain, but died just six months after arriving in London at the age of 20. He learned of his son's death when Captain John McCluer later visited the islands. Andrew Cheyne wrote about his encounter with Abba Thulle in the book A Description of Islands In The Western Pacific Ocean, North and South of the Equator. William Lisle Bowles wrote a poem about him entitled Abba Thule's Lament For His Son Prince Le Boo. A horse was named after him that later won the Doncaster Cup in 1790.
