= Prince Lee Boo =

First visitor to Britain from Palau

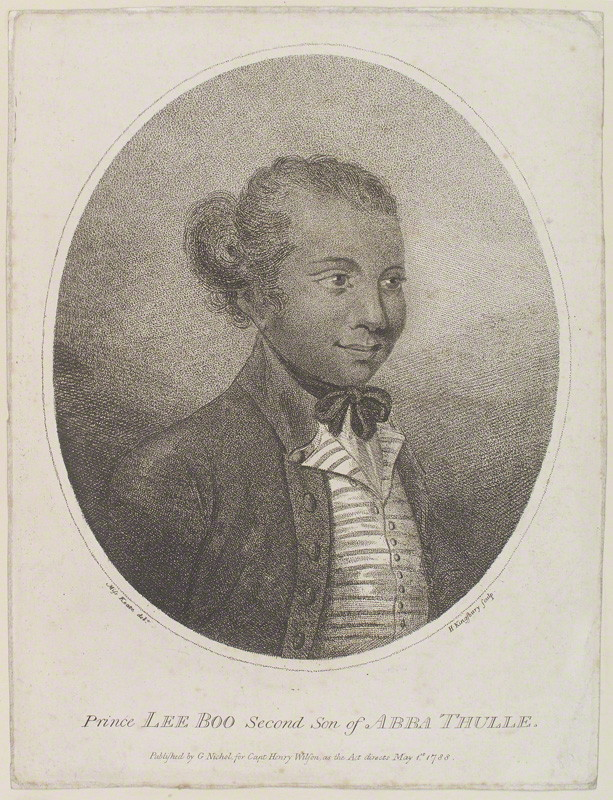
- by Henry Kingsbury, after Georgiana Jane Henderson (née Keate)
- Born: c. 1764; Koror, Pelew Islands (now Palau)
- Died: 27 December 1784 (aged 19–20); London, England
- Education: European school in London
- Known for: Visiting Great Britain in the 18th century

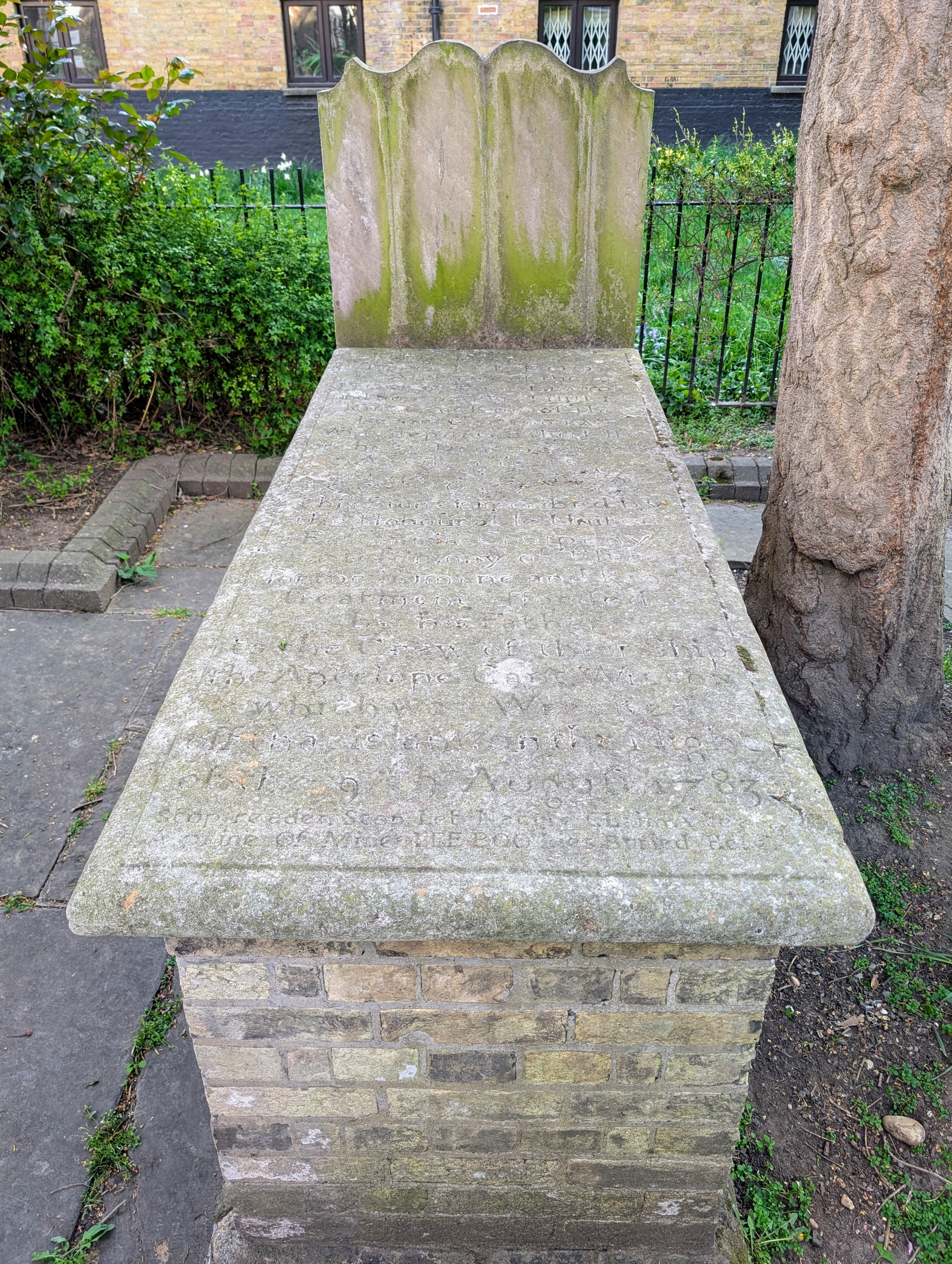
Monument to Prince Lee Boo, St Mary's Church, Rotherhithe

Prince Lee Boo or Lebu (c. 1764 – 27 December 1784) was the second son of Abba Thulle (Ibedul), the ruler of Koror in the Pelew Islands, now called Palau. He was one of the first people from the Pacific Islands to visit Great Britain. When the China trader Antelope, on a voyage to China for the East India Company, was wrecked on the island of Oroolong in Western Palau in 1783, its survivors, including Captain Henry Wilson, spent three months on Palau. When the survivors were finally rescued, Wilson agreed to take Lee Boo to London to acquire more knowledge about Europe.

He arrived about a decade after the Tahitian Omai, on 14 July 1784, in Portsmouth, aboard the Morse, and was quickly dubbed "The Black Prince" by London society, who were charmed by his poise and intelligence. The Wilson family took him into their home in London, where he attended church ceremonies, dinner parties and European school for several months. However, he died of smallpox on 27 December 1784, some six months after his arrival in London. He was 20 years old.

He was buried at St Mary's Church, Rotherhithe. His tomb is Grade II listed and inscribed with the words "Stop, reader, stop, let Nature shed a tear / A prince of mine, Lee Boo, lies buried here".

Prince Lee Boo's story appeared in a book by George Keate, titled: An Account of the Pelew Islands, Situated in the Western Part of the Pacific Ocean. Composed from the Journals and Communications of Captain Henry Wilson, and some of his Officers, who, in August 1783, were there Shipwrecked, in the Antelope, a Packet belonging to the Hon. East India Company. The author's daughter, Georgiana Jane Keate (later Georgiana Henderson), painted the portrait of Prince Lee Boo in the book. It was painted from memory, fifteen months after Prince Lee Boo's death. The book was popular, and was translated into over 20 languages between 1789 and 1850. An abridged version, titled The Interesting History of Prince Lee Boo, Brought to England from the Pelew Islands, is available online.
