= Adolf Friedrich von Reinhard =

German jurist and publicist (1726–1783)

(Adolf) Friedrich von Reinhard (19 January 1726, in Altstreliz – 6 August 1783, in Weimar) was a German jurist and publicist. He was a Pietist and supporter of Christian August Crusius.

Reinhard studied law in Toruń and theology at the University of Halle. In 1744 he founded Kritische Sammlungen zur neusten Geschichte der Gelehrsamkeit. He won first prize from the Prussian Academy of Sciences for La Système de Mr. Pope sur la perfection du monde comparé à celui de Mr. Leibniz (1755), a critique of the philosophy of Alexander Pope, Leibniz and Christian Wolff. He became professor of law at the university of Bützow in 1770.
