= Anne Russell (artist) =

British artist (1781–1857)

Anne Russell (1781–1857) was an English pastellist.

Russell was born in London, and was the daughter of painter John Russell. She produced copies of her father's pastels as well as those of Rosalba Carriera, and was said to assist her father not only in his painting but also in making his pastels. Her siblings were also artists; William Russell and Jane Russell produced pastels, while Maria was a watercolorist. A variety of pastels by her hand, largely copies of the work of other artists, are known to survive.
