= Antelope (1781 EIC packet ship) =

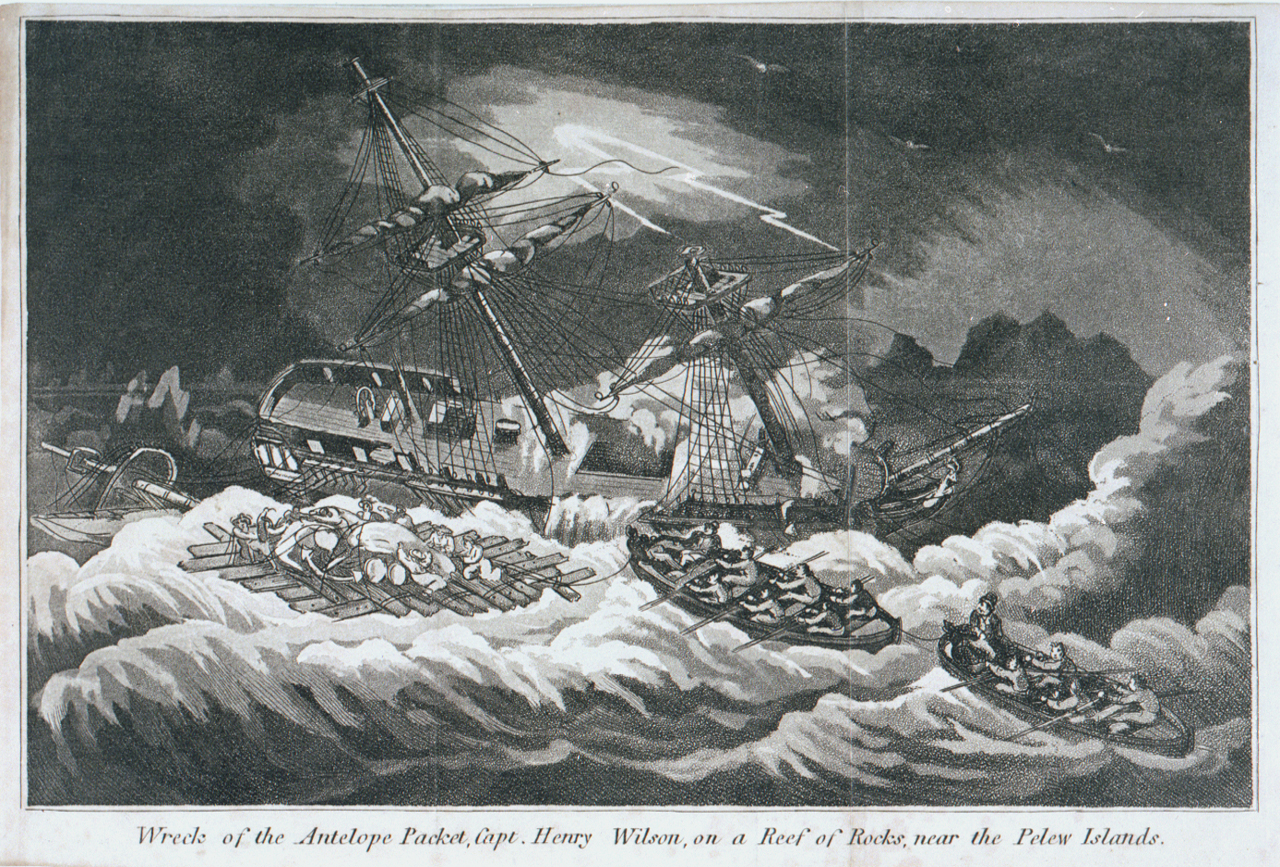
- Wreck of the Antelope Packet, Capt. Henry Wilson, on a Reef of Rocks, near the Pelew Islands by Thomas Tegg, National Maritime Museum

History

British East India Company
- Name: Antelope
- Owner: British East India Company
- Builder: Barnard
- Launched: 31 December 1781 (measured 1781)
- Fate: Wrecked 1783

General characteristics
- Tons burthen: 270, or 170 (bm)
- Length: 118 ft 4 in (36.1 m) (overall); 96 ft 8 in (29.5 m) (keel)
- Beam: 25 ft 7 1/2 in (7.8 m)
- Depth of hold: 12 ft 0 in (3.7 m)
- Sail plan: Barque
- Complement: 52
- Armament: 8 × 6-pounder guns + swivel guns
- Notes: Coppered hull; It is possible Antelope was originally built in Newbury, MA and called Franklin.

Antelope was a packet ship built for the British East India Company (EIC) in 1781. She made one voyage for the company that ended when she was wrecked on 10 August 1783 off Ulong, near Koror Island in Palau. This resulted in the first sustained European contact with those islands.

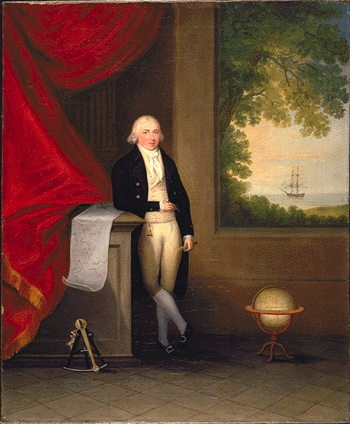
Captain Henry Wilson, portrait about 1782 by Arthur William Devis

Captain Henry Wilson left the Downs on 6 February 1781 to carry despatches to China via the Pacific route. However, Antelope did not leave Falmouth until 2 September. (Note: Hardy incorrectly shifts the year to 1782, and the destination as Madras and Bengal.) On 16 December she was off Cape San Diego, Argentina, and then on 2 January 1782 she was off Cape Horn. She reached the Sulu Sea on 23 April, Cageyan Sulu on 30 April, Balambangan on 14 May, and arrived at Macao on 4 June. On 16 September 1782 Antelope left Calcutta.

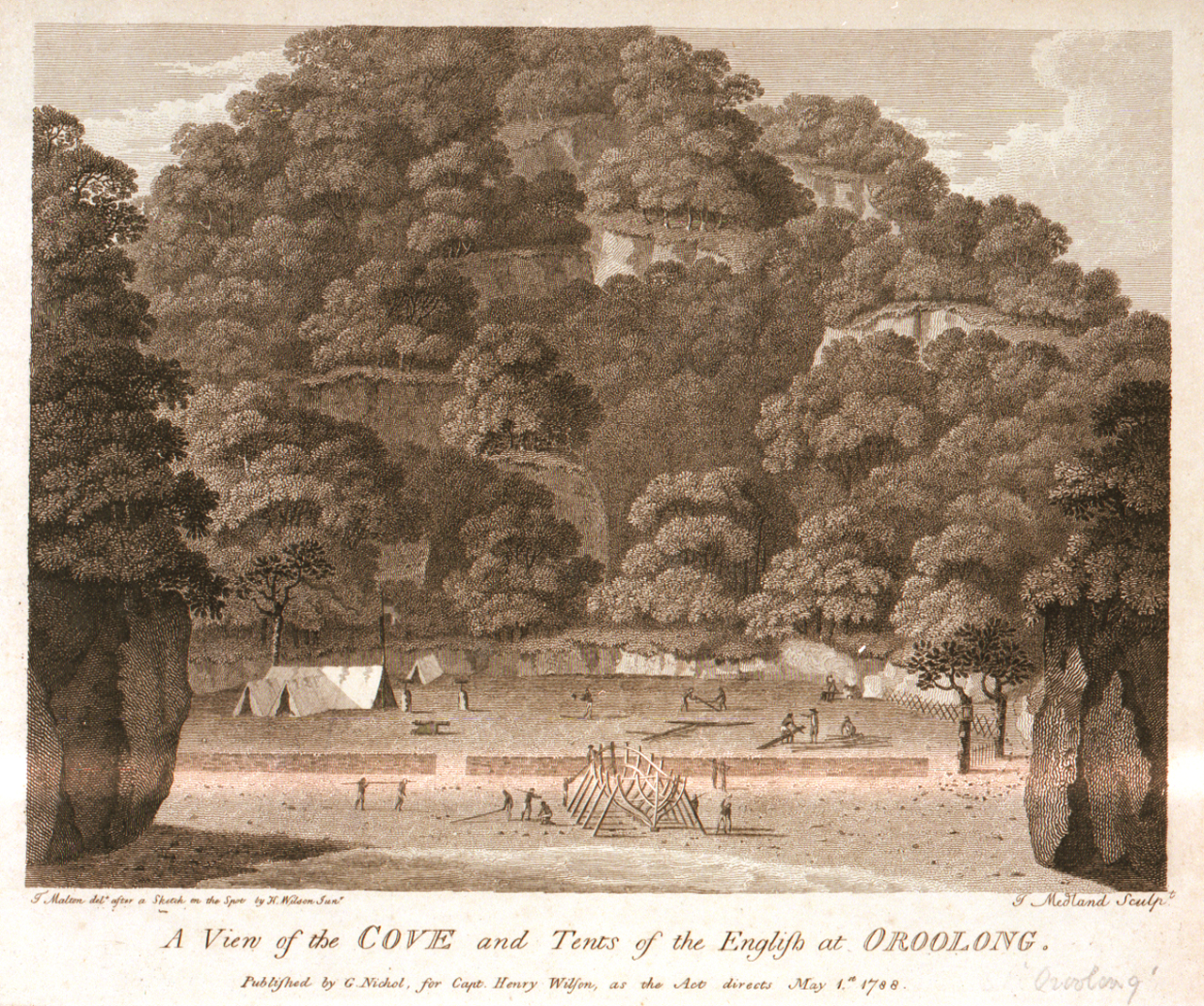
A View of the Cove and Tents of the English at Oroolong while the sailors were building their escape vessel the Oroolong

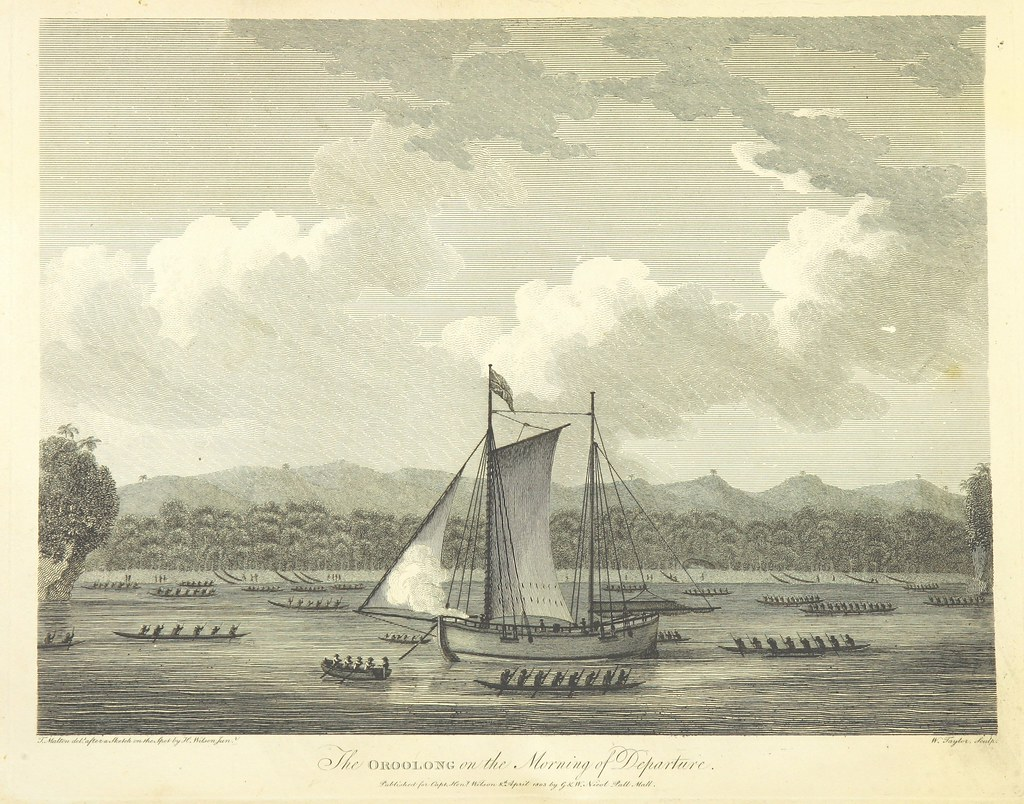
The Oroolong on the Morning of Departure

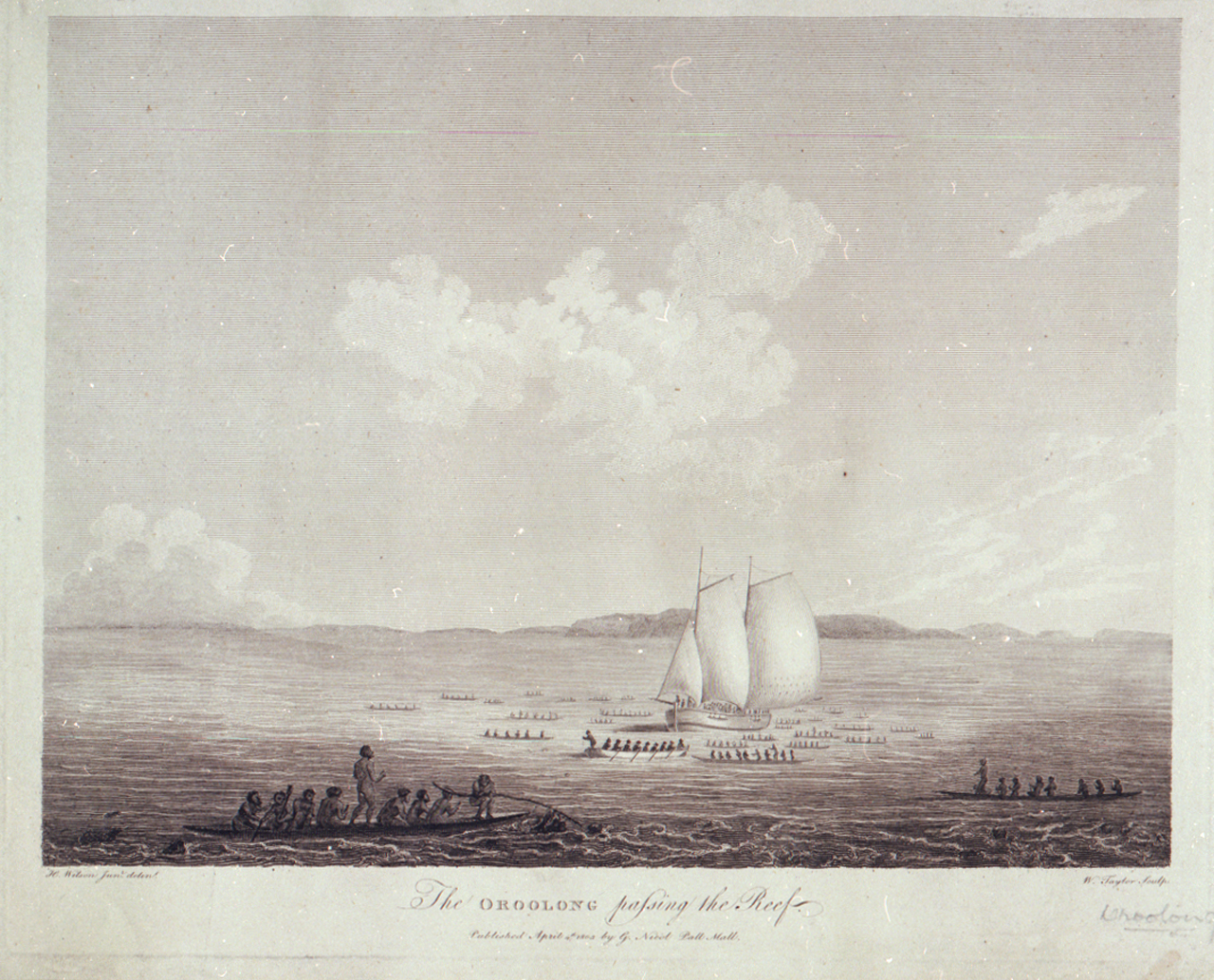
The Oroolong passing the Reef

She left Macao on 20 July 1783 and wrecked on 10 August on the reef near the Pelew Islands. (Note: These are not the Sir Edward Pellew Group of Islands. The Pelew Islands is an old name for Palau.) They then spent some time on Oroolong Island (today Ulong Island) before natives from other Palau islands found them (Oroolong being little used).

One contemporary report gave the location of the wreck at about 7°19′N 134°40′E. However, this is east of Palau, and Ulong is west of Palau at about 7.283274°N 134.282627°E. Antelope's reckoning appears to have been off by some 26 miles.

With the assistance of the natives, Wilson and his crew used boards from Antelope, and new materials, to build a boat, which they called the Oroolong. Wilson brought with him Prince Lee Boo, and left behind Madan Blanchard, a seaman who chose not to leave. Blanchard died in an engagement with locals sometime before 1790.

They left the island on 12 November and arrived on 30 November back at Macao. Captain Wilson sailed from Macao to Canton, where he sold his ship for $700. He returned to England with Prince Lee Boo on the East Indiaman Morse, and they arrived on 14 July 1784. Prince Lee Boo died of smallpox five months after arriving in England.

The painter Arthur William Devis was a passenger on Antelope when she wrecked.

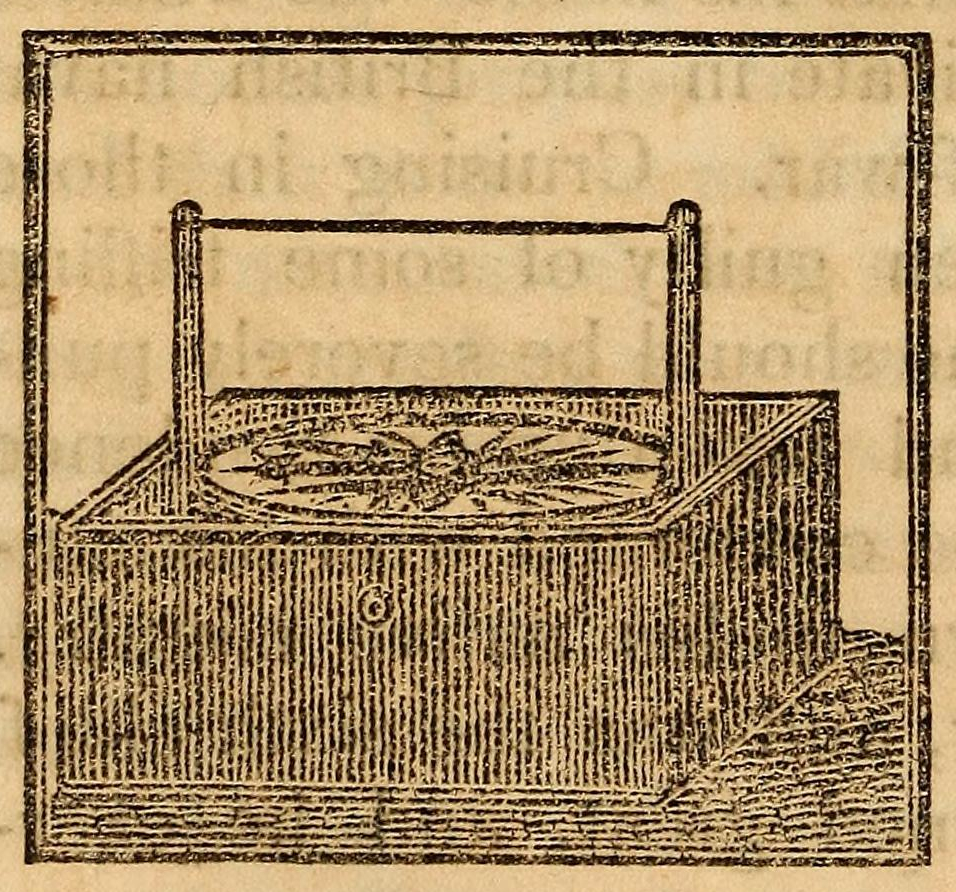
Antelope's compass

Antelope's compass, which Capt. Henry Wilson had given to one of the local chiefs, was later handed over to a crew member of Mentor. A violent storm in 1832 had wrecked Mentor on Lord North's Island.
