= Ulong Island =

Major island and channel of western Palau

Coordinates: 7.284945°N 134.283624°E

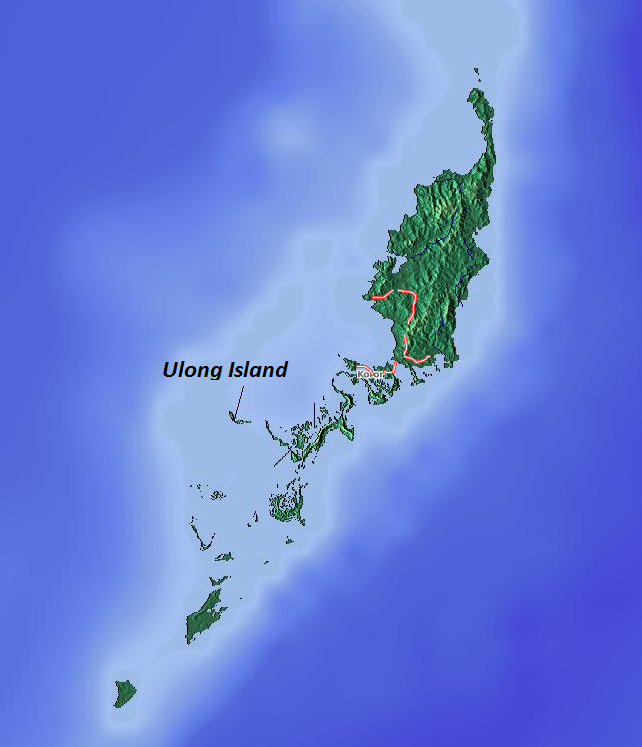
Location in Palau

Ulong is a major island and channel of western Palau. It is sometimes called Aulong and originally written Oroolong in English. Ulong is regarded by many as one of the best drift dives in the world.

== Geography ==
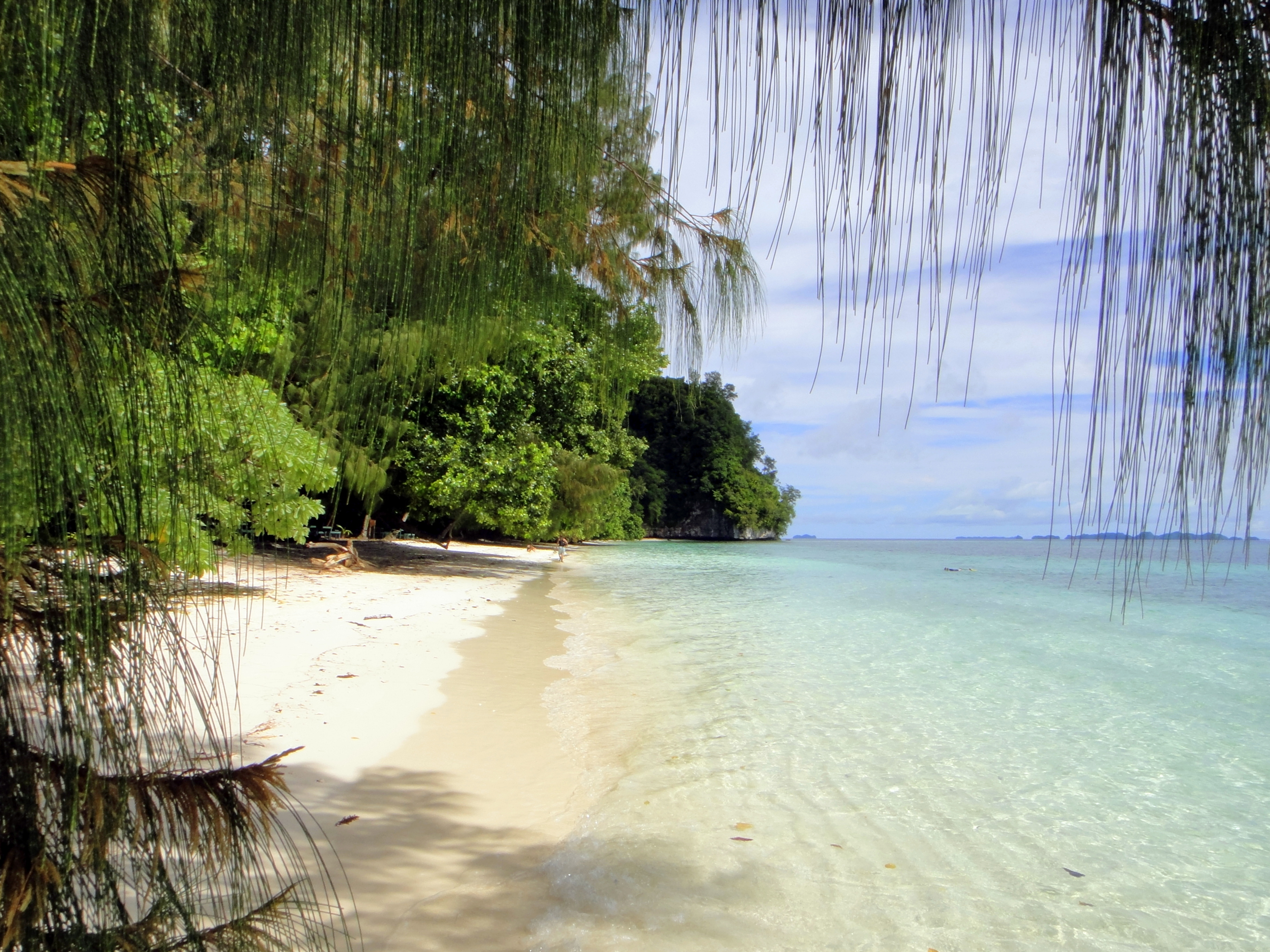
Beach on Ulong Island, 2013

Ngerumekaol Pass, also known as Ulong Channel, partially cuts through the reef near the Island. The channel stretches about 500 metres (1,600 ft), with an average width of 33 metres (108 ft) and leads into a coral reef lagoon. There are sharks within the currents of the channel and Ulong Corner. The channel contains giant clams and one of the largest known patches of green lettuce coral in the world. Uruktapel is the largest island southward of Koror; at about 2 miles (3.2 km) off its western point is Ulong. Denges and Eil Malk Passages are passable, but navigation may be difficult in the lagoon between them and Ulong Island. From Ulong to Malakal Harbor, the lagoon is navigable.

== History ==
Henry Wilson (1740–1810), an English naval captain of the British East India Company was aboard his packet ship Antelope, when it shipwrecked off Ulong Island in 1783; he returned to England with the local Prince Lee Boo. In the late 1700s, the island's inhabitants attempted to defend Ulong from attack along Ikesakes Reef but, having been defeated, were forced to leave. There are Palau Cave Paintings on the island.
