= John Russell (English painter) =

English painter (1745–1806)

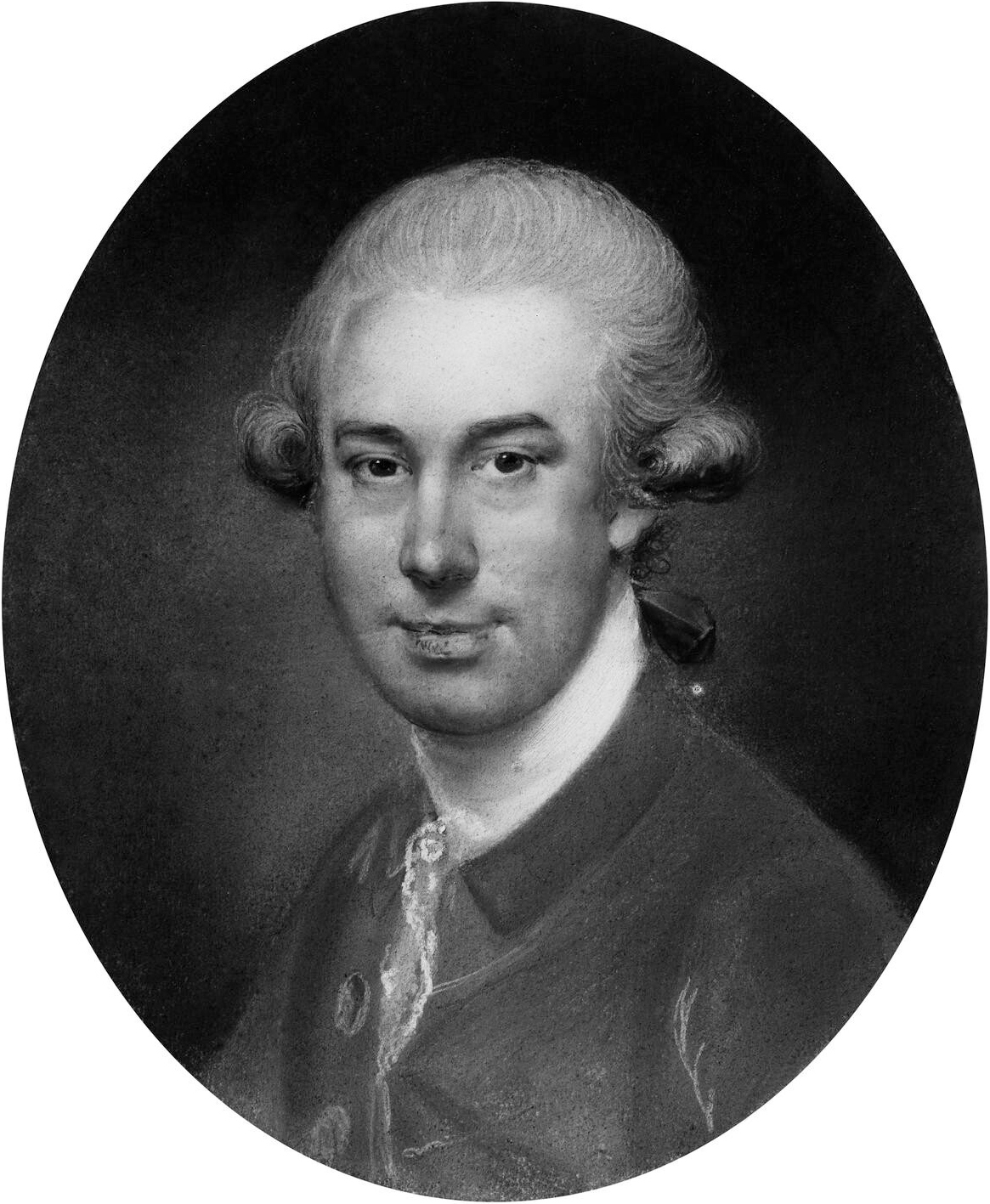
John Russell, self-portrait c. 1780

John Russell RA (29 March 1745 – 20 April 1806) was an English painter renowned for his portrait work in oils and pastels, and as a writer and teacher of painting techniques.

== Life and work ==
Russell was born in Guildford, Surrey, the son of John Russell Snr., book and print seller and four times mayor of the town; his father was something of an artist, and drew and published two views of Guildford. Russell was educated at the Royal Grammar School, Guildford, and soon showed a strong inclination for art. He trained under Francis Cotes RA (of Cavendish Square, London), one of the pioneers of English pastel painting, and, like Cotes, was an admirer of the pastel drawings of Rosalba Carriera whose methods influenced his technique of "sweetening". At the age of 19 he converted to Methodism, which was the cause of tension with his family and with his teacher; he made no secret of his strong evangelical leanings and would attempt to preach and convert at every opportunity.

Russell set up his own studio, in London, in 1767. He made the acquaintance of the notorious Dr. William Dodd, whose portrait he painted in 1768. He was introduced to Selina, Countess of Huntingdon, who unsuccessfully attempted to persuade him to give up painting and attend her Methodist ministers' training college at Trevecca in Wales. On 5 February 1770, he married Hannah Faden, daughter of a Charing Cross print and map seller, whom he had converted. They lived at No. 7 Mortimer Street, Cavendish Square, where he had moved in 1770.

Russell's work caused him to travel extensively around Britain. In 1772, he wrote Elements of Painting with Crayons, by which time he had won premiums for his drawings from the Society of Arts in 1759 and 1760, and entered the Royal Academy school of art in 1770, winning its gold medal for figure drawing the same year. He exhibited at the Society of Artists of Great Britain in 1768 and showed 330 works at the Academy between 1769 until and his death.

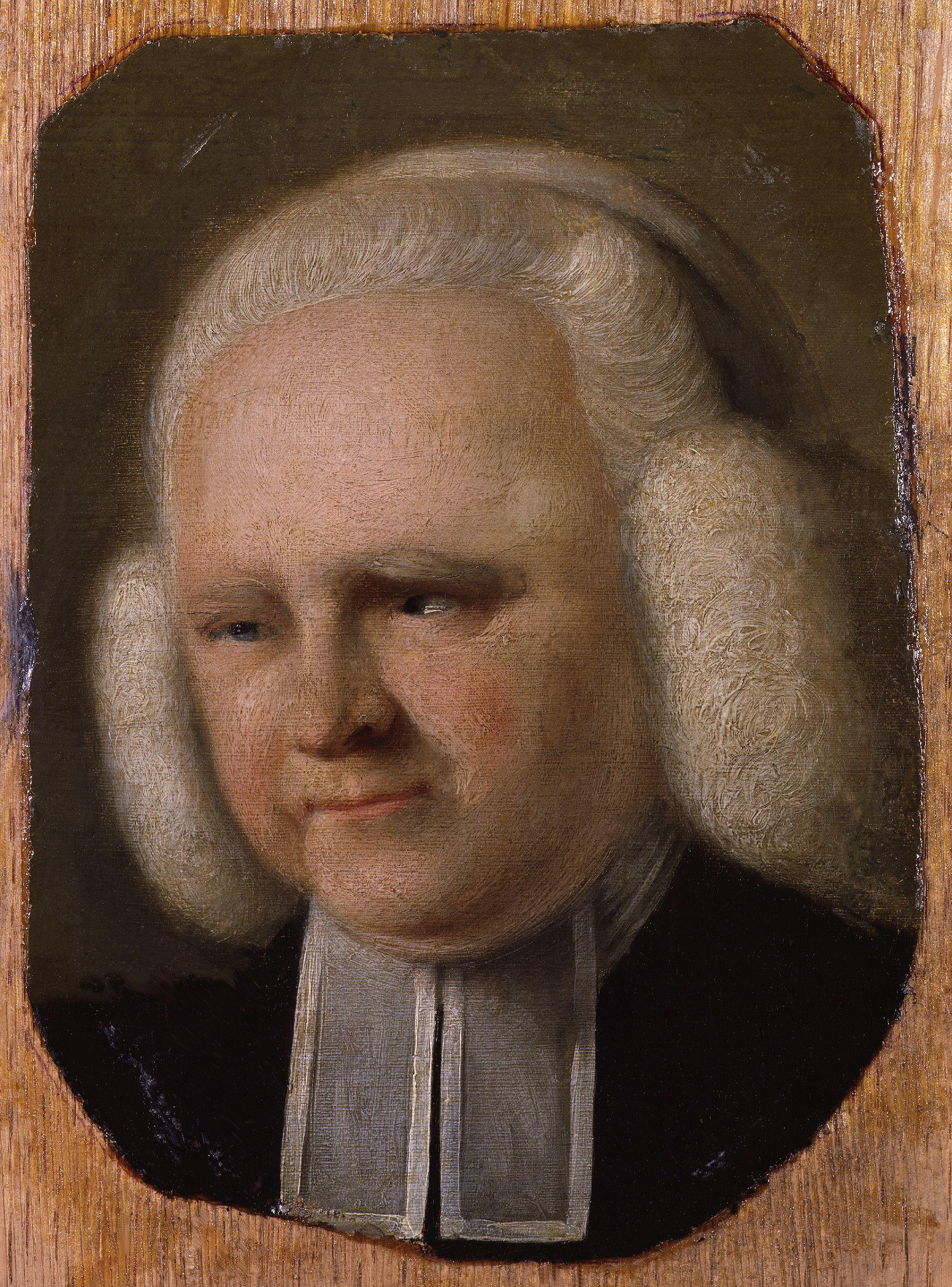
Portrait of George Whitefield

In 1770, Russell painted Methodist minister, George Whitefield (engraved by James Watson) and the future philanthropist, William Wilberforce, then only eleven years old. In 1771, he exhibited a portrait in oils of Charles Wesley at the Royal Academy and, in 1772, painted Selina, Countess of Huntingdon in pastel. This was a symbolic picture, and was lost on its voyage out; but it was engraved, and he later also painted her in oils. Also in that year he was elected an associate of the Royal Academy. The following year, 1773, he painted John Wesley (engraved by Bland).

In 1788, after a long wait, Russell was elected a royal academician, in the same year painting a portrait of the naturalist Sir Joseph Banks. In 1789, he was commissioned to portray the royal physician Francis Willis. The results obviously pleased the monarch as, in 1790, he was appointed Crayon (pastel) Painter to King George III, Queen Charlotte, the Prince of Wales (both of whom Russell also painted) and the Duke of York. With such royal patronage, he developed a large and fashionable clientele.

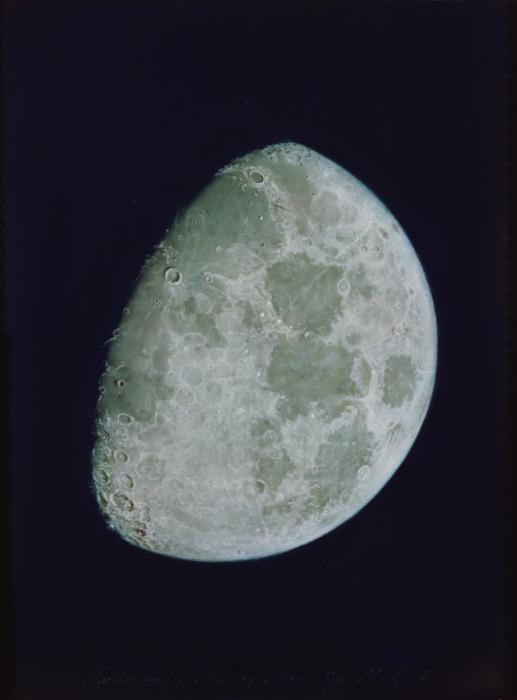
The Face of the Moon (1793–1797), Russell's pastel drawing of a gibbous moon. "He showed the moon at seventeen or eighteen days, but in doing so added an oblique – and impossible – source of illumination. Under the resulting raking light all the variations of the moon's surface are thrown into greater relief."

Russell was a man of deep religious beliefs, a devout follower of George Whitefield. He began an elaborate introspective diary in John Byrom's shorthand in 1766 and continued it to the time of his death. In it, he recorded his own mental condition and religious exercises, and occasionally information concerning his sitters. Though his religion appears to have become less militant after his marriage, his diary bears witness to his anxiety with regard to his spiritual welfare. Not only would he not work on Sunday, but he would allow no one to enter his painting-room. He was afraid to go out to dinner on account of the loose and blasphemous conversation which he might hear. He was on good terms with Sir Joshua Reynolds, with whom he dined at the academy, the Dilettanti Society, and the Literary Club (now The Club), but he records that on these or other festive occasions he always left early.

He was troubled by ill-health for much of his life, and in 1803 became almost deaf following a bout of cholera. He died in Hull in 1806 after contracting typhus.

Russell's work can be viewed at many galleries in the UK and around the world, but the largest collection is held by Guildford House Art Gallery in Guildford. Many of his portraits were engraved by, amongst others, Joseph Collyer, Charles Turner, James Heath, Dean, Bartolozzi and Trotter.

== Astronomy ==
Russell was interested in astronomy and made, with the assistance of his daughter, a lunar map, which he engraved on two plates which formed a globe showing the visible surface of the Moon – it took twenty years to finish. He also invented an apparatus for exhibiting the phenomena of the Moon, which he called "Selenographia". Russell's large and highly detailed pastel drawing of The Face of the Moon (1793–1797) is "the most faithful early representation of the lunar sphere". Some of his best portraits were of the era's acclaimed scientists, such as his friend William Herschel, who he depicted holding a stellar chart showing his discovery of Uranus. It was Herschel who provided the powerful telescope that Russell used for his painstaking lunar observations.

== Family ==
Of his twelve children (of which four died in infancy), William Russell (1780–1870), exhibited portraits at the Royal Academy from 1805 to 1809. The National Portrait Gallery contains a portrait of Judge Sir John Bayley by him. He was ordained in 1809, and gave up painting. He was forty years rector of Shepperton, Middlesex, and died on 14 September 1870. Two of John's daughters, Anne and Jane, became artists as well.
