= Willie Pwaisiho =

Melanesian Anglican bishop (born 1948)

The Right Reverend Willie Pwaisiho
- Bishop of Malaita
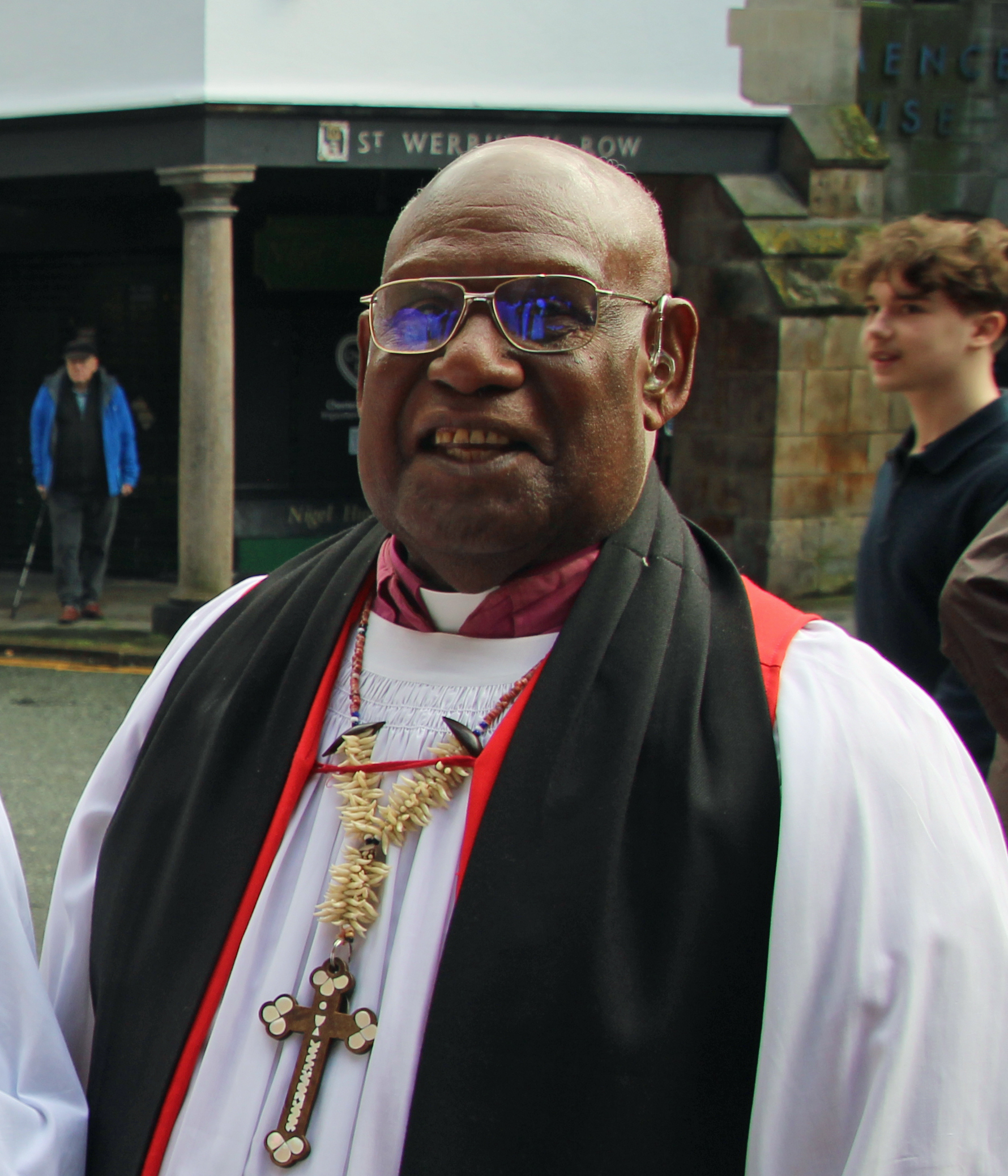
- Bishop Pwaisiho in 2024
- Diocese: Diocese of Malaita
- In office: 1981–1989
- Other posts: General Secretary, Melanesian Board of Mission (1990–1995); Honorary assistant bishop, Diocese of Chester (1997–2019); Rector of Gawsworth (1999–2019)

Orders
- Ordination: 1974 (deacon); 1975 (priest)
- Consecration: 28 June 1981

Personal details
- Born: 14 May 1948 (age 78)
- Denomination: Anglican
- Parents: Stephen Honiuhi & Esther Makatoro
- Spouse: Kate Kome Oikada
- Children: 2 sons; 3 daughters
- Education: Bishop Patteson Theological College, Kohimarama

William Alaha Pwaisiho, OBE (called Willie; born 14 May 1948) is a retired Anglican bishop who served as a bishop of the Anglican Church of Melanesia and then a priest in the Church of England.

== Early ministry ==
Pwaisiho was ordained a deacon in 1974 and a priest in 1975; he was Chaplain to Norman Palmer, Archbishop of Melanesia and to the Police in Honiara, both in 1976. He then became curate (the first missionary priest from Melanesia), at Mission Bay, New Zealand (1977–1978) then Chaplain and Tutor, Bishop Patteson Theological College in Kohimarama (1979–1980) where he himself had trained. His final post before appointment to the episcopate was as Dean of St Barnabas Provincial Cathedral, Honiara (1980–1981).

== Bishop of Malaita ==
His election to become the second Bishop of Malaita was reported in May 1981 and he was duly consecrated on 28 June 1981 at Malaita Cathedral. He resigned as Bishop of Malaita in 1989, becoming a tutor at the Melanesian Brotherhood HQ in Tabalia for a year, then the first General Secretary of the Melanesian Board of Mission, Honiara until 1995.

== Parish ministry ==
Pwaisiho returned to parish ministry, first in the east of Honiara, 1995–1997, then in the UK as assistant curate at St Anne and St Francis, Sale until 1999. With his arrival in Sale he was licensed as an honorary assistant bishop of the Diocese of Chester, and following his curacy in Sale, he was appointed Rector of Gawsworth, Cheshire in 1999. In Cheshire, he has served as Chaplain to John Richards, High Sheriff (2002–2003); as Honorary Chaplain to the national charity CrimeBeat (2004–present); and a Member of the Ethnic Minority Independent Advisory Group for Cheshire Constabulary. He became an Officer of the Order of the British Empire (OBE) in 2004 and is also a member of Melanesian Mission UK and of the Churches Together in Britain and Ireland Pacific Forum. He retired from Gawsworth in January 2019.

Anglican Communion titles
Preceded by Leonard Alufurai	Bishop of Malaita; 1981–1989	Succeeded by Raymond Aumae
