= Monk =

Member of a monastic religious order

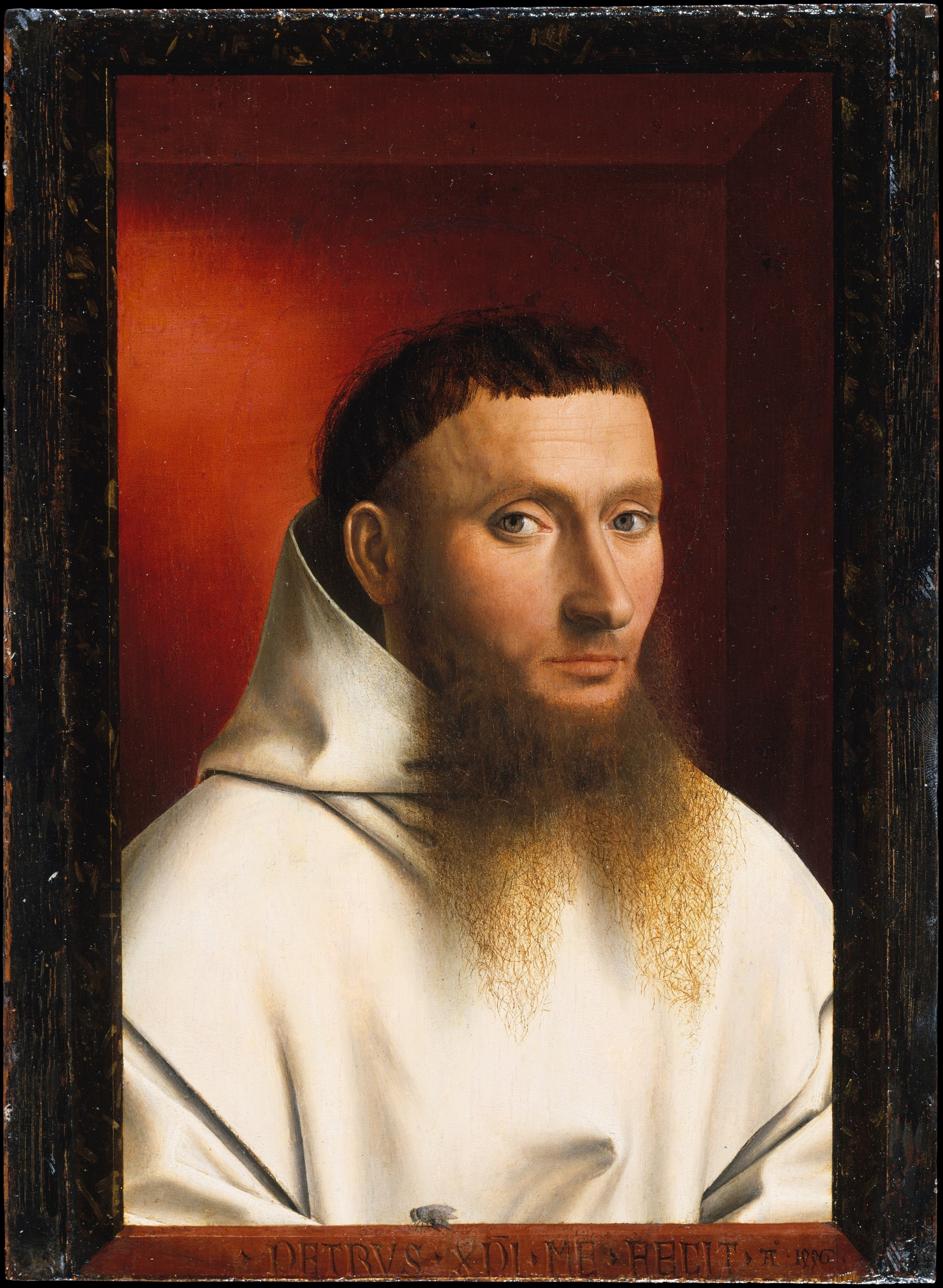
Painting of a Catholic monk of the Carthusian order by Flemish painter Petrus Christus in 1446

A monk (/mʌŋk/; from Greek: μοναχός, monachos, 'single, solitary', via Latin monachus) is a man who is a member of a religious order and lives in a monastery. A monk usually lives his life in prayer and contemplation. The concept is ancient and can be seen in many religions, and in philosophy, across numerous cultures. Monasticism is historically rooted in the Sramana movements of ancient India, which produced the structured ascetic orders of Jainism and Buddhism. Benedict of Nursia is considered to be the originator of western monasticism.

== Origins and early traditions ==
Monasticism is historically rooted in the Sramana movements of ancient India, which produced the structured ascetic orders of Jainism and Buddhism. Jain monasticism is defined by the Mahavratas (Five Great Vows) and a rigorous adherence to non-violence (ahimsa). Similarly, the Buddhist Sangha follows the Vinaya, a disciplinary code balancing asceticism with communal living.

In Hinduism, monasticism is formally recognized in the Sannyasa stage of life, where practitioners (sadhus) renounce worldly ties to pursue spiritual liberation. In the West, Christian monasticism emerged in the third century with the Desert Fathers later evolving into organized communal living under a rule, which emphasizes a life of prayer, study, and manual labor.

The Greek word for monk may be applied to men or women. In English, however, monk is applied mainly to men, while nun is typically used for female monastics. Although the term monachos is of Christian origin. However, being generic, it is not interchangeable with terms that denote particular kinds of monk, such as cenobite, hermit, anchorite, or hesychast.

Traditions of Christian monasticism exist in major Christian denominations, with religious orders being present in Catholicism, Lutheranism, Oriental Orthodoxy, Eastern Orthodoxy, Reformed Christianity (Calvinism), Anglicanism and Methodism. Indian religions, including Hinduism, Buddhism and Jainism, have monastic traditions as well.

== Buddhism ==
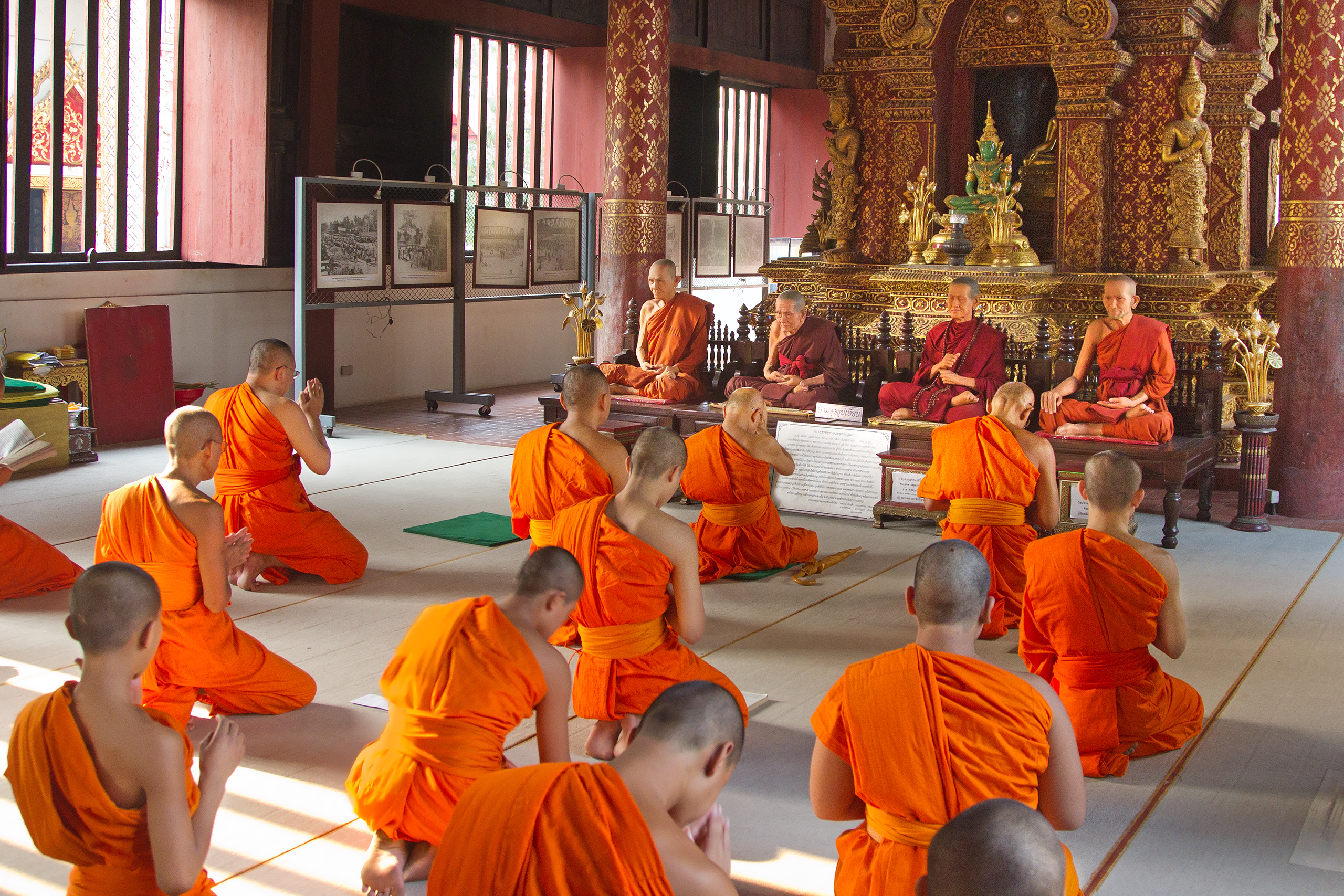
Buddhist monks in Thailand

In Theravada Buddhism, bhikkhu is the term for monk. Their disciplinary code is called the patimokkha, which is part of the larger Vinaya. They live lives of mendicancy, and go on a morning almsround (Pali: pindapata) every day. The local people give food for the monks to eat, though the monks are not permitted to positively ask for anything. The monks live in monasteries, and have an important function in traditional Asian society. Young boys can be ordained as samaneras. Both bhikkhus and samaneras eat only in the morning, and are not supposed to lead a luxurious life. Their rules forbid the use of money, although this rule is nowadays not kept by all monks. The monks are part of the Sangha, the third of the Triple Gem of Buddha, Dhamma, Sangha.

In Mahayana Buddhism, the term 'Sangha' strictly speaking refers to those who have achieved certain levels of understanding. They are therefore called 'community of the excellent ones' (Standard Tibetan: mchog kyi tshogs); however, these in turn need not be monks (i.e., hold such vows). Several Mahayana orders accept female practitioners as monks, instead of using the normal title of "nun", and they are considered equal to male ascetics in all respects.

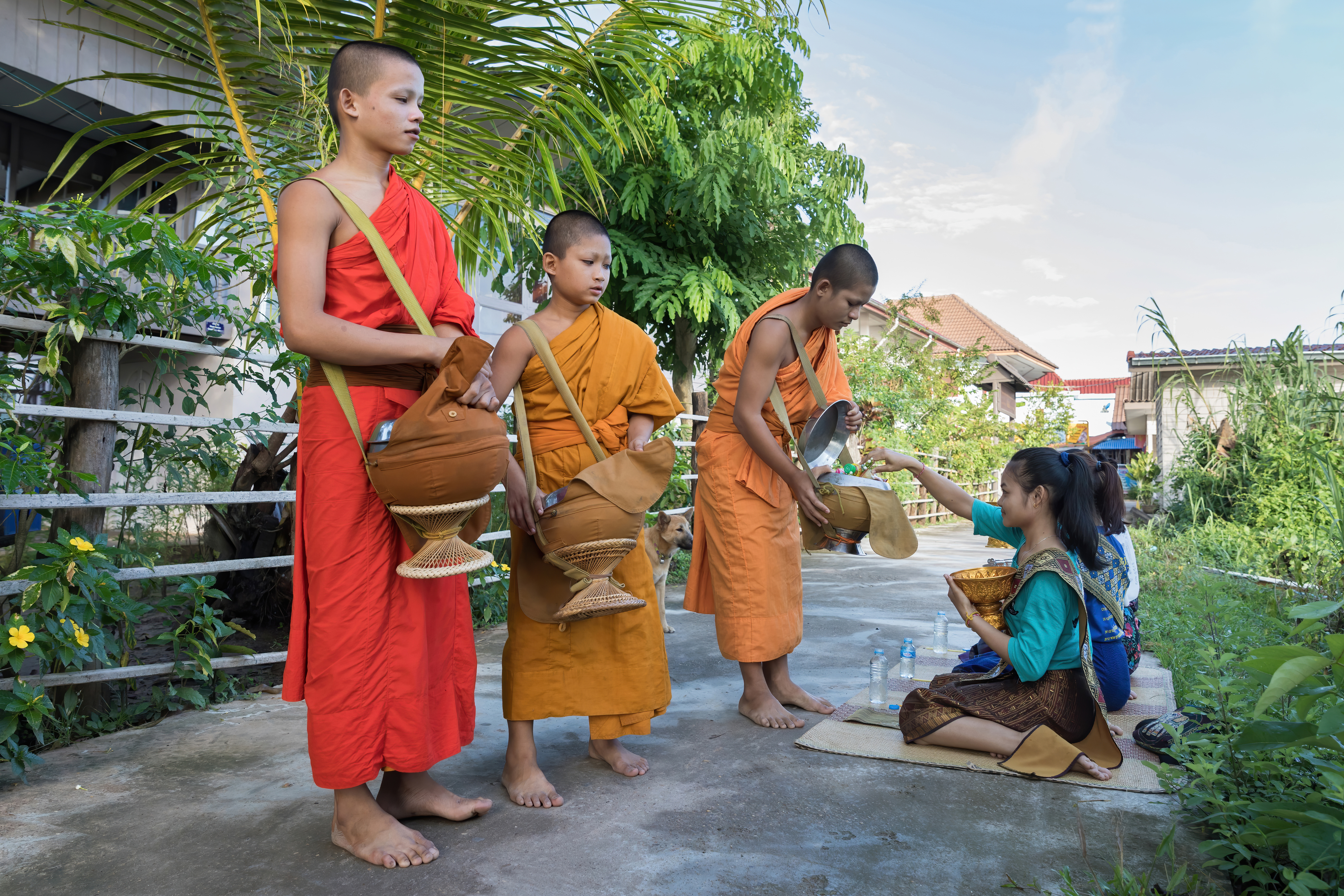
Buddhist monks collecting alms

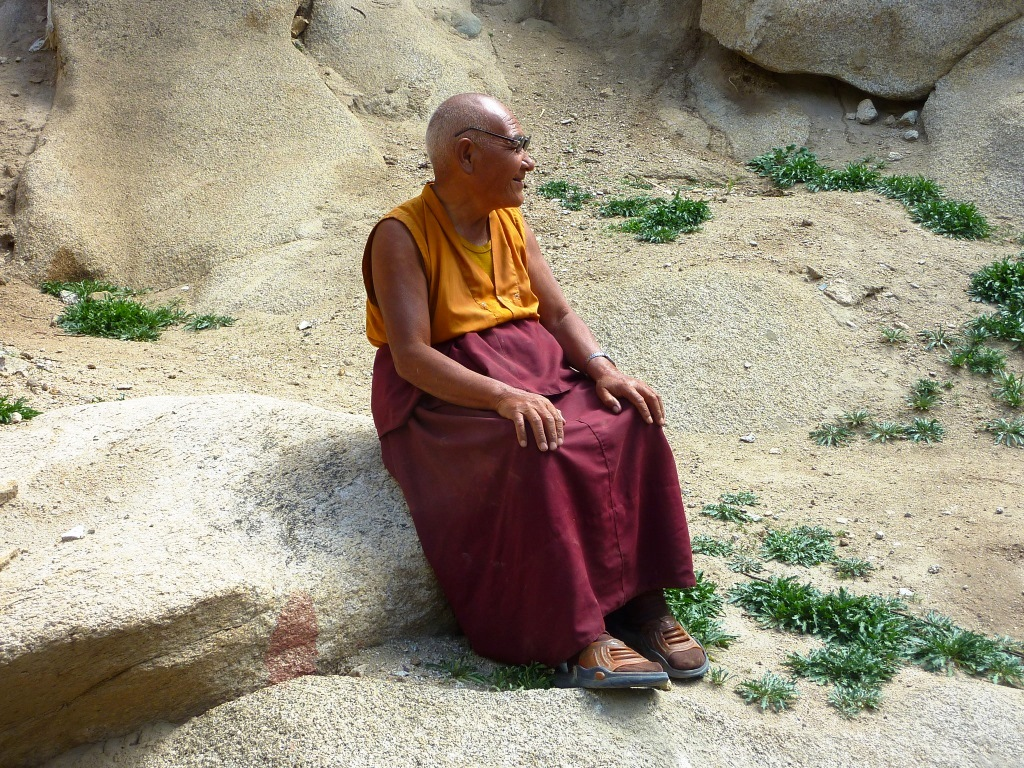
Monk resting in Ladakh

The Bhikkhus are only allowed four items (other than their robes): a razor, a sewing needle, an alms bowl and a water strainer.

In Vajrayana Buddhism, monkhood is part of the system of 'vows of individual liberation'; these vows are taken in order to develop one's own personal ethical discipline. The monks and nuns form the (ordinary) sangha. As for the Vajrayana vows of individual liberation, there are four steps: A lay person may take the 5 vows called 'approaching virtue' (in Tibetan 'genyen' < dge snyan>). The next step is to enter the monastic way of life (Tib. rabjung) which includes wearing monk's or nun's robes. After that, one can become a 'novice' (Pali samanera, Tib. getshül); the last and final step is to take all vows of the 'fully ordained monk' (gelong). This term 'gelong' (Tib. < dge long>, in the female form gelongma) is the translation of Skt. bikshu (for women bikshuni) which is the equivalent of the Pali term bhikkhuni; bhikkhu is the word used in Theravada Buddhism (Sri Lanka, Burma, Thailand).

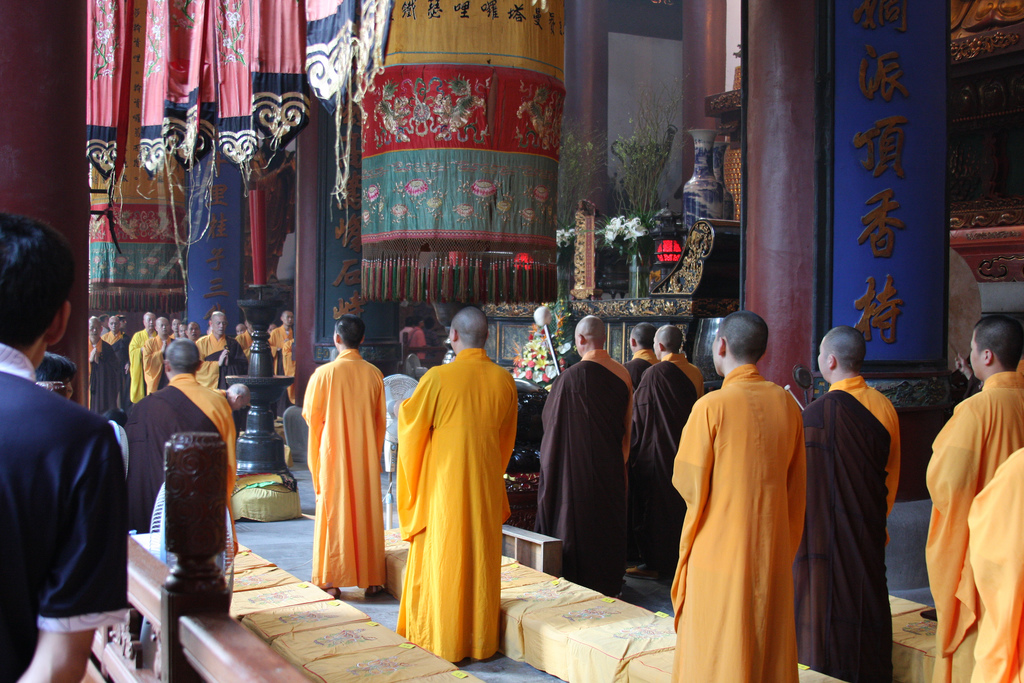
Buddhist monks performing ceremony in Hangzhou, China

Chinese Buddhist monks have been traditionally and stereotypically linked with the practice of the Chinese martial arts or Kung fu, and monks are frequently important characters in martial arts films. This association is focused around the Shaolin Monastery. The Buddhist monk Bodhidharma, traditionally credited as the founder of Zen Buddhism in China, is also claimed to have introduced Kalaripayattu (which later evolved into Kung Fu) to the country. This latter claim has however been a source of much controversy (see Bodhidharma, the martial arts, and the disputed India connection). One more feature about the Chinese Buddhist monks is that they practice the burning marks on their scalp, finger or part of the skin on their anterior side of the forearm with incense as a sign of ordination.

In Thailand and Burma, it is common for boys to spend some time living as a monk in a monastery. Most stay for only a few years and then leave, but a number continue on in the ascetic life for the rest of their lives.

In Mongolia during the 1920s, there were about 110,000 monks, including children, who made up about one-third of the male population, many of whom were killed in the purges of Choibalsan.

== Jainism ==
One of the most intense forms of Asceticism can be found in Jainism, one of the world's oldest religions. Jainism encourages fasting, yoga practices, meditation in difficult postures, and other austerities. According to Jains, one's highest goal should be attaining Nirvana or Moksha (i.e., liberation from samsara, the cycle of birth and rebirth). For this, a soul has to be without attachment or self-indulgence. This can be achieved only by the monks and nuns who take five great vows: of non-violence, of truth, of non-stealing, of non-possession and of celibacy.

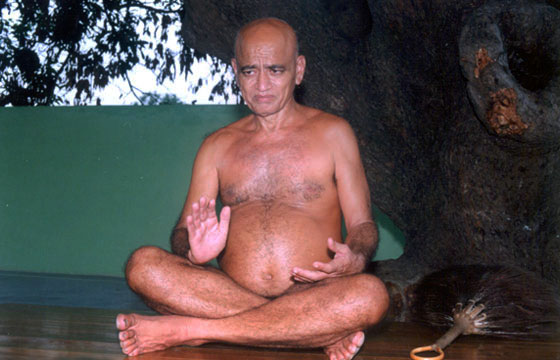
Acharya Vidyasagar, a possessionless and detached Digambara Jain monk

Most of the austerities and ascetic practices can be traced back to Vardhaman Mahavira, the twenty-fourth "fordmaker" or Tirthankara. The Acaranga Sutra, or Book of Good Conduct, is a sacred book within Jainism that discusses the ascetic code of conduct. Other texts that provide insight into conduct of ascetics include Yogashastra by Acharya Hemachandra and Niyamasara by Acharya Kundakunda. Other illustrious Jain works on ascetic conduct are Oghanijjutti, Pindanijjutti, Cheda Sutta, and Nisiha Suttafee. Full Jain monk in either Śvetāmbara or Digambara tradition can belong to one of these ranks:

- Acharya: leader of the order
- Upadhyaya: a learned monk, who both teaches and studies himself
- Muni: an ordinary monk

These three are mentioned is the three lines of the Namokar Mantra. In the Digambara tradition, a junior monk can be a:

- Ailak: they use one piece of cloth
- Kshullak: they may use two pieces of cloth

The Śvetāmbara Terapanth sect has a new rank of junior monks who are called samana. The nuns are called Aryikas in Digambar tradition and Sadhvi in the Śvetāmbara tradition.

=== Ascetic vows ===
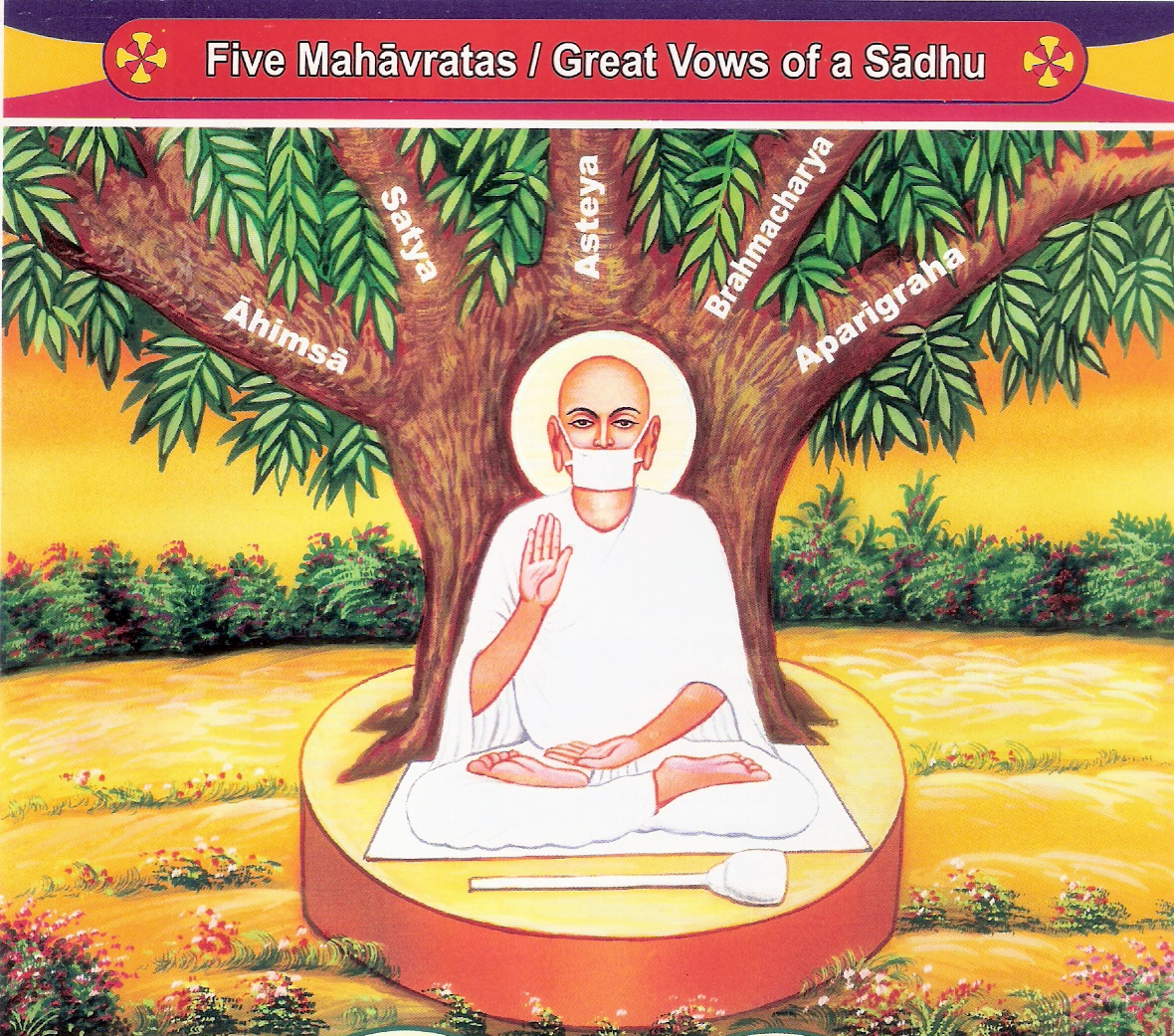
Five Mahavratas of Jain ascetics

Per the Jain vows, the monks and nuns renounce all relations and possessions. Jain ascetics practice complete non-violence. Ahimsa is the first and foremost vow of a Jain ascetic. They do not hurt any living being, be it an insect or a human. They carry a special broom to sweep away any insects that may cross their path. Some Jain monks wear a cloth over the mouth to prevent accidental harm to airborne germs and insects. They also do not use electricity as it involves violence. Furthermore, they do not use any devices or machines.

As they are without possession and attachment, they travel from city to city, often crossing forests and deserts, and always barefoot. Jain ascetics do not stay in a single place for more than two months to prevent themselves from becoming attached to any location. However, during four months of monsoon (rainy season) known as chaturmaas, they continue to stay in a single place to avoid killing the life forms that thrive during the rains. Jain monks and nuns practice complete celibacy. They do not touch or share a sitting platform with a person of opposite sex.

=== Dietary practices ===
Jain ascetics follow a strict vegetarian diet without root vegetables. Śvetāmbara monks do not cook food but solicit alms from householders. Digambara monks have only a single meal a day. Neither group will beg for food, but a Jain ascetic may accept a meal from a householder, provided that the latter is pure of mind and body and offers the food of his own volition and in the prescribed manner. During such an encounter, the monk remains standing and eats only a measured amount. Fasting (i.e., abstinence from food and sometimes water) is a routine feature of Jain asceticism. Fasts last for a day or longer, up to a month. Some monks avoid (or limit) medicine or hospitalization due to their careful attention to body.

=== Austerities and other daily practices ===
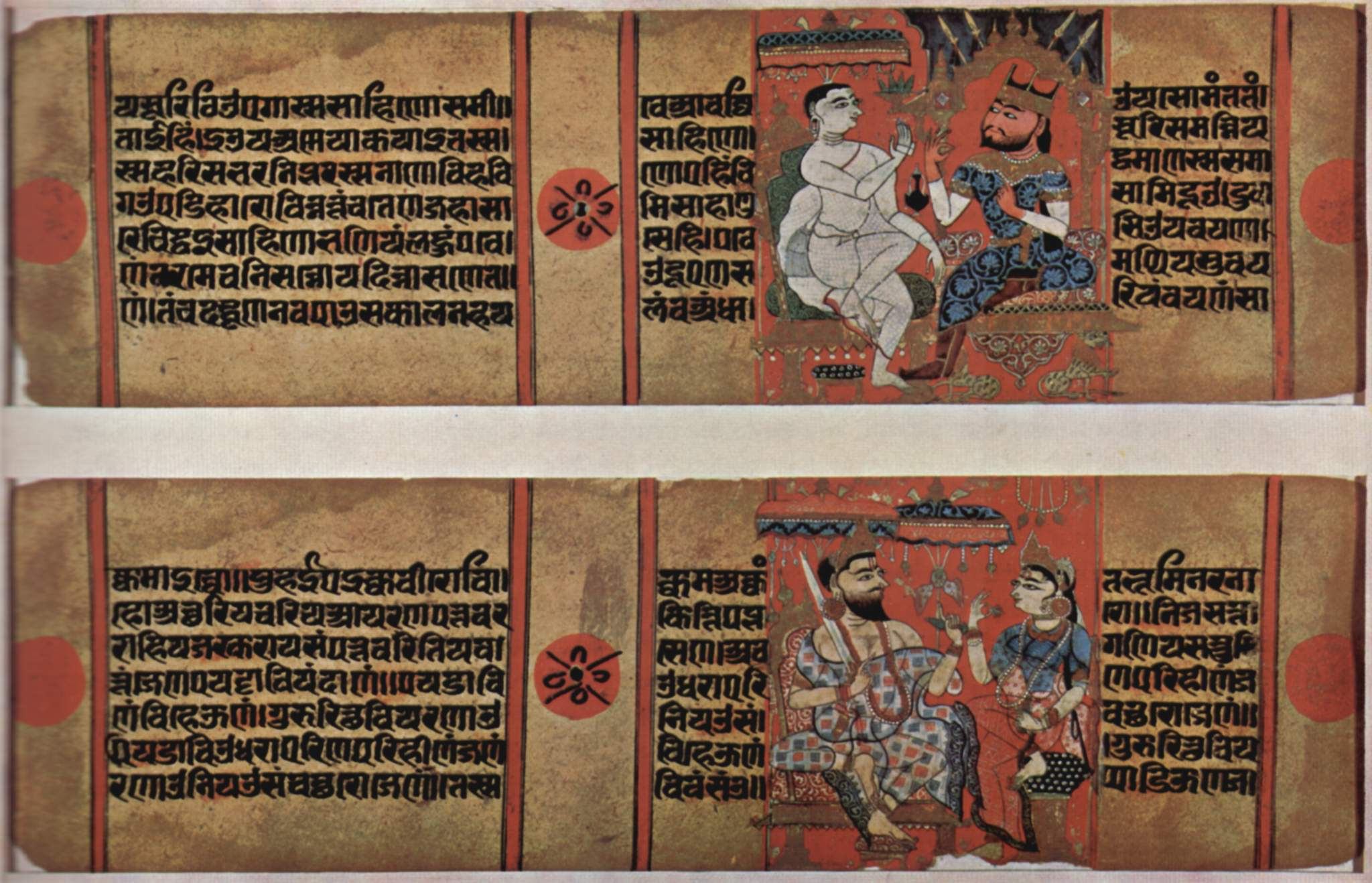
White-clothed Acharya Kalaka

Other austerities include meditation in seated or standing posture near river banks in the cold wind, or meditation atop hills and mountains, especially at noon when the sun is at its fiercest. Such austerities are undertaken according to the physical and mental limits of the individual ascetic. Jain ascetics are (almost) completely without possessions. Some Jains (Śvetāmbara monks and nuns) own only unstitched white robes (an upper and lower garment) and a bowl used for eating and collecting alms. Male Digambara monks do not wear any clothes and carry nothing with them except a soft broom made of shed peacock feathers (pinchi) and eat from their hands. They sleep on the floor without blankets and sit on special wooden platforms.

Every day is spent either in study of scriptures or meditation or teaching to lay people. They stand aloof from worldly matters. Many Jain ascetics take a final vow of Santhara or Sallekhana (i.e., a peaceful and detached death where medicines, food, and water are abandoned). This is done when death is imminent or when a monk feels that he is unable to adhere to his vows on account of advanced age or terminal disease.

Quotes on ascetic practices from the Ācārāṅga Sūtra as Hermann Jacobi translated it:

A monk or a nun wandering from village to village should look forward for four cubits, and seeing animals they should move on by walking on his toes or heels or the sides of his feet. If there be some bypath, they should choose it, and not go straight on; then they may circumspectly wander from village to village.

— Third Lecture(6)

I shall become a Sramana who owns no house, no property, no sons, no cattle, who eats what others give him; I shall commit no sinful action; Master, I renounce to accept anything that has not been given.' Having taken such vows, (a mendicant) should not, on entering a village or scot-free town, &c., take himself, or induce others to take, or allow others to take, what has not been given.

— Seventh Lecture (1)

== Christianity ==
=== Western Christianity ===
==== Catholicism ====
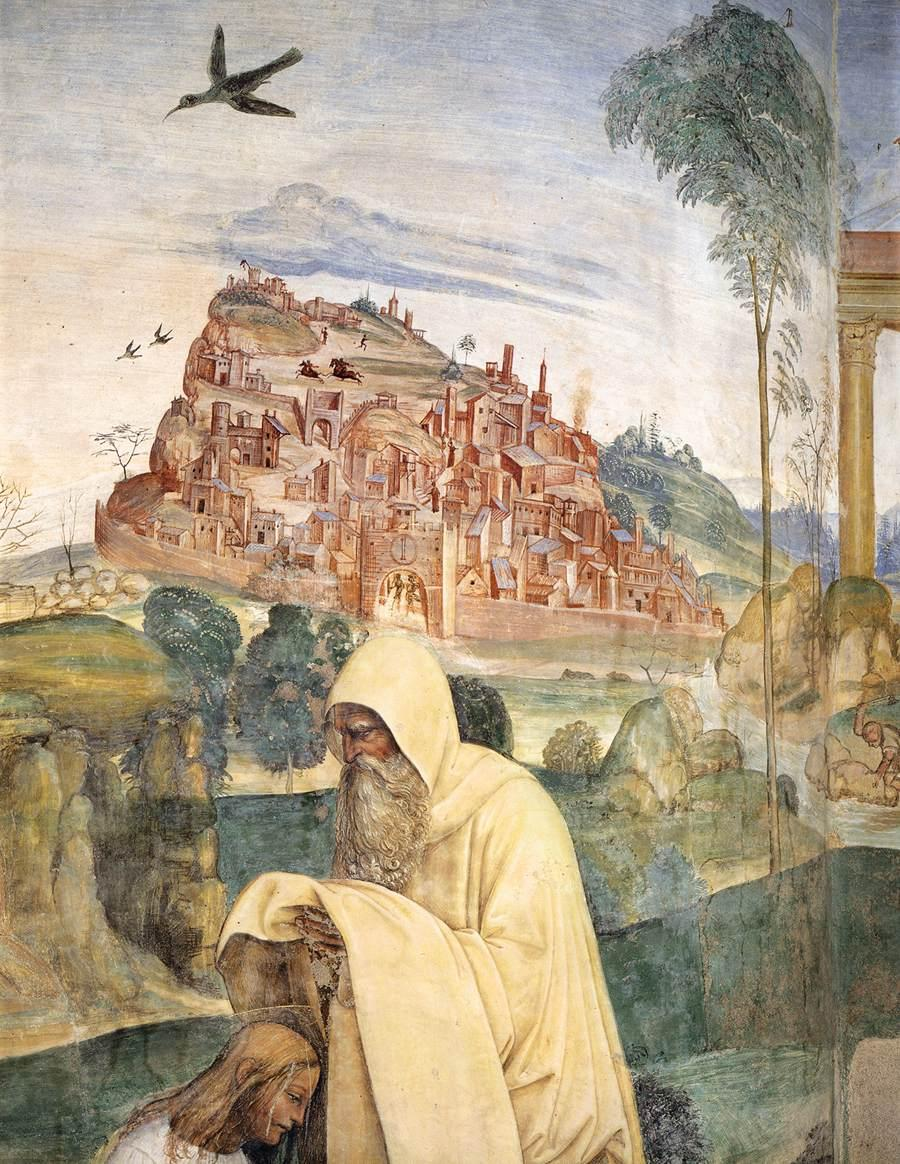
Investiture of Saint Benedict, scene from the fresco cycle on the life of St. Benedict in Monte Oliveto Maggiore

Within Catholicism, a monk is a member of a religious order who lives a communal life in a monastery under a monastic rule of life. Benedict of Nursia, (480-543 or 547 AD) is considered to be the originator of western monasticism. Benedict's rule, is the foundation for the Benedictines and all of its reform groups such as the Cistercians and the Trappists. Benedict founded the great Monte Cassino in 529.

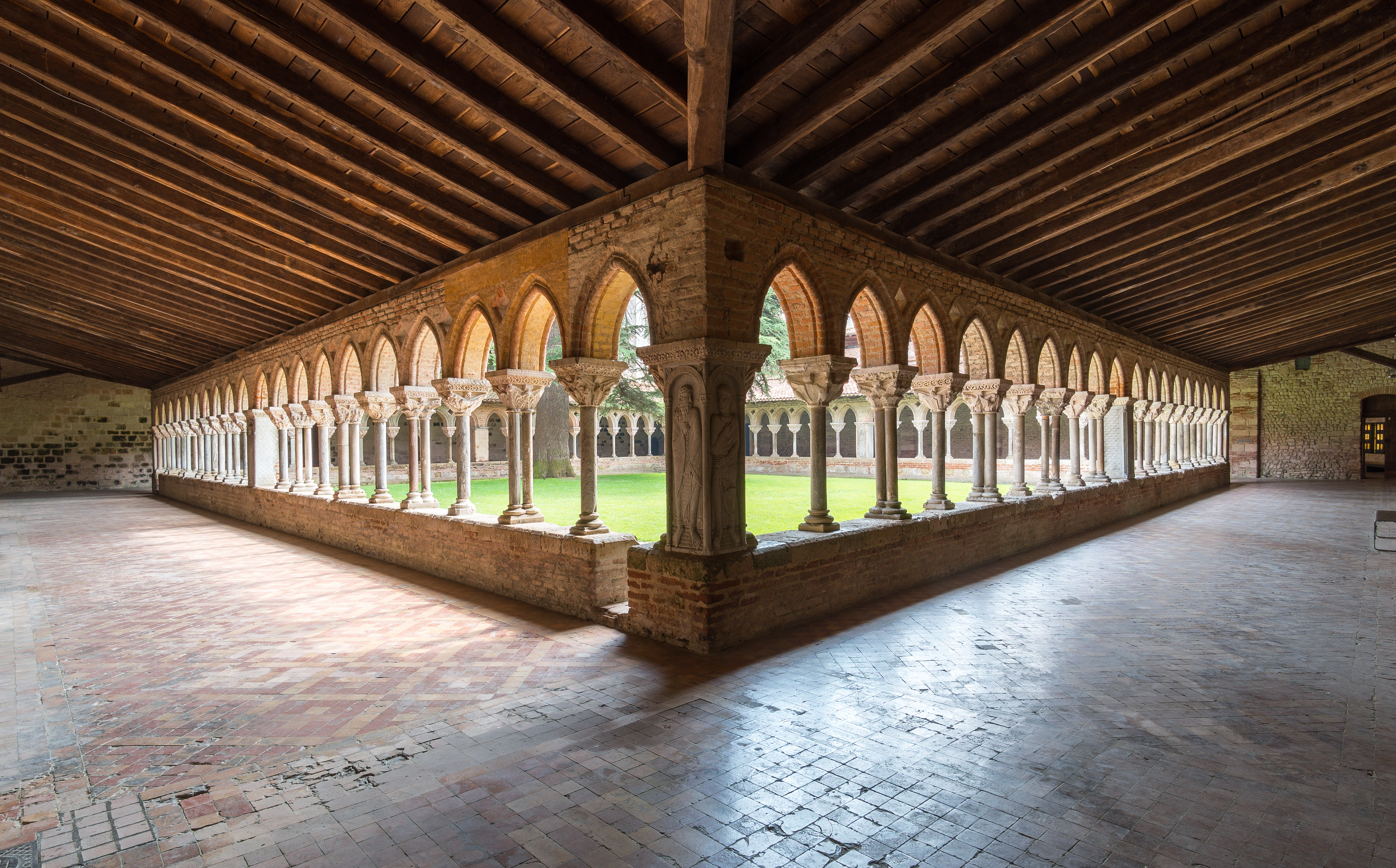
The cloisters of Moissac Abbey in France

Benedict pointed out in his rule stability, conversion of life and obedience as promises. Obedience calls for the monk to obey Christ, as represented by the superior person of the monastery, which is an abbot or a prior. Conversion of life means, generally, that the monk converts himself to the way of a monk, which is death to self and to the world and life to God and to his work. A monk is to be an instrument of God's work. Stability entails that the monk commit himself to the monastery for the remainder of his life, and so, upon death, will be buried at its cemetery. The vow of stability (stabilitas loci) is unique to Benedictines.

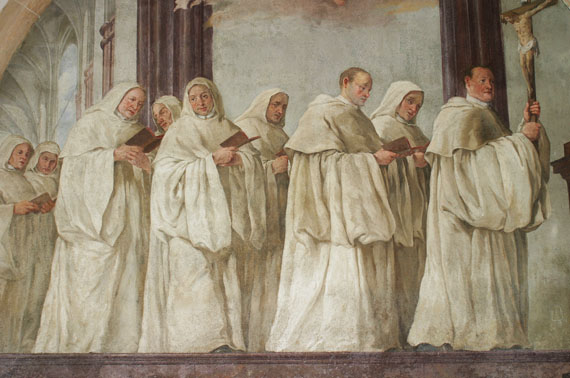
Fresco of Cistercian monks at the murals the murals of the Chapter house of Osek abbey in Bohemia

The solemn vows in other religious orders were eventually established as vows of poverty, chastity and obedience. Poverty requires that they renounce any ownership of property or assets, except for items that were allowed to them by their superior (such as a habit, books etc.), and to live meekly, sharing whatever they might have with the poor. Chastity requires that since they were willing to dedicate their lives to God, they sacrificed the love between men and women and stay either virginal or chaste.

To become a monk, one first must be accepted by a community as a postulant. During the time of postulancy the man lives at the monastery to test his vocation, to get to know the community and the community to get to know him. If the postulant and the community agree that the postulant should become a novice, he is received as such. At this time he is usually given the habit and a religious name. Both the community and the novice evaluate further whether the man is called to become a monk and he begins to participate more fully in the life of the community. As a postulant and novice, the man is free to leave the community at any time or the institute can dismiss him. Following the novitiate, which must last at least one canonical year (but not longer than two years) in the community of the novitiate the novice may profess first vows, if he is accepted to do so. After a few years (usually three) the monk makes solemn vows, which are binding for life.

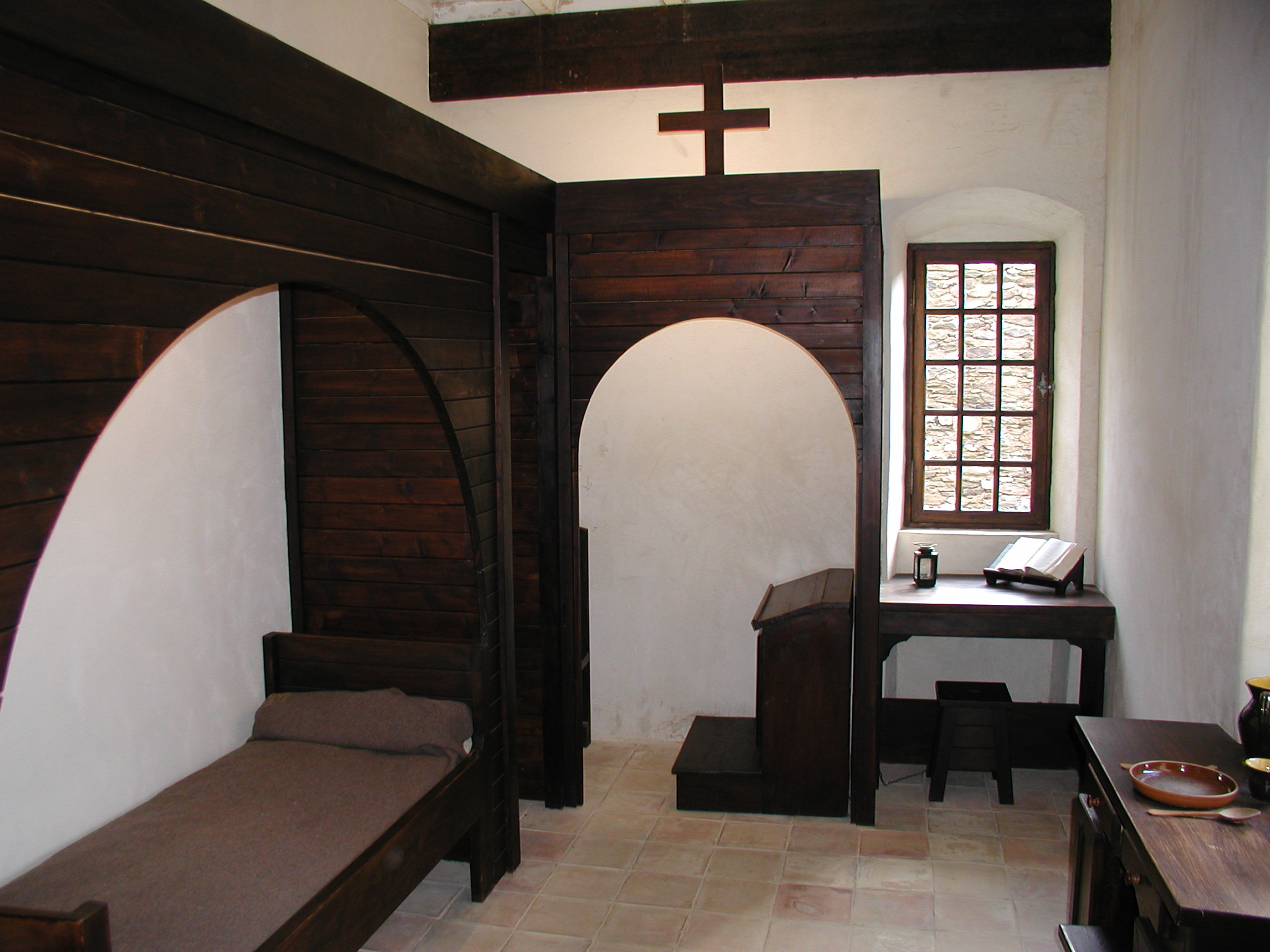
Monastic cell in the La Verne Charterhouse, now resettled by the Monastic Family of Bethlehem, of the Assumption of the Virgin and of Saint Bruno

The monastic life generally consists of prayer in the form of the Liturgy of the Hours, also known as the Divine Office, reading of the divine scriptures (lectio divina) and labor. Among most religious orders, monks live in simple, austere rooms called cells and come together daily to celebrate and to recite the Liturgy of the Hours and the Mass. Usually, the monks take their meals together in the refectory. Many communities have a period of silence lasting from evening until the next morning and some others restrict talking to only when it is necessary for the monks to perform their work and during weekly recreation.

Monks who have been or will be ordained into Holy Orders as priests or deacons were traditionally referred to as "choir monks". Those monks who are not ordained into Holy Orders are referred to as lay brothers. In most monastic communities today, little distinction exists between the lay brothers and the choir monks, as they all have the obligation to celebrate the entire Divine Office daily in choir. However, historically, the roles of the two groups of monks within the monastery differed. The work of the choir monks was considered to be prayer, chanting the hours of the Divine Office, whereas the lay brothers provided for the material needs of the community by growing food, preparing meals, maintaining the monastery and the grounds. This distinction arose historically because generally those monks who could read Latin typically became choir monks, while those monks who were illiterate or could not read Latin became lay brothers. The lay brothers would instead recite at least some of the liturgical hours prayers such as the Lord's Prayer or the Hail Mary. Since the Second Vatican Council, the distinction between choir monks and lay brothers has been deemphasized, as the council allowed the Liturgy of the Hours to be celebrated in the vernacular language, effectively opening participation to all of the monks.

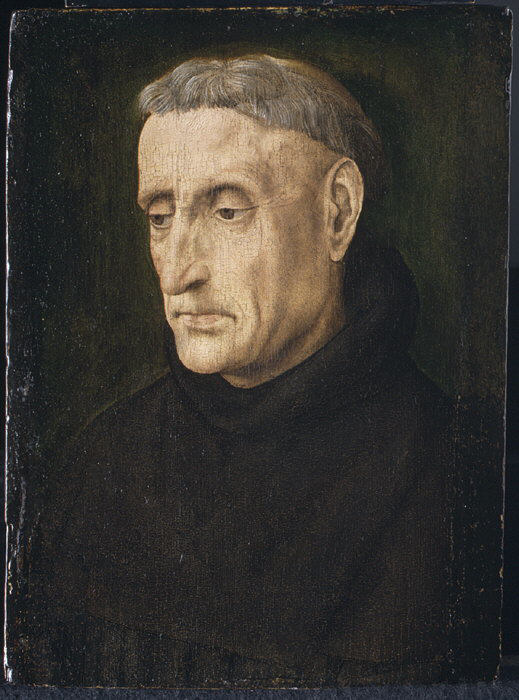
Portrait of a Benedictine monk by Hugo van der Goes circa 1478

Within western monasticism, it is important to differentiate between monks and friars. Monks generally live a contemplative life of prayer confined within a monastery while friars usually engage in an active ministry of service to the outside community. The monastic orders include all Benedictines (the Order of Saint Benedict and its later reforms including the Cistercians and the Trappists) and the Carthusians, who live according to their own statutes. Orders of friars include the mendicant orders (primarily Order of Friars Minor, Capuchins, Dominicans, Carmelites, and Augustinians). Although the canons regular (such as the Norbertines) and the clerics regular (such as the Jesuits) live in community, they are neither monks nor friars as they are characterized by their clerical state and not by any monastic vows.

==== Lutheranism ====
Further: Lutheran religious orders

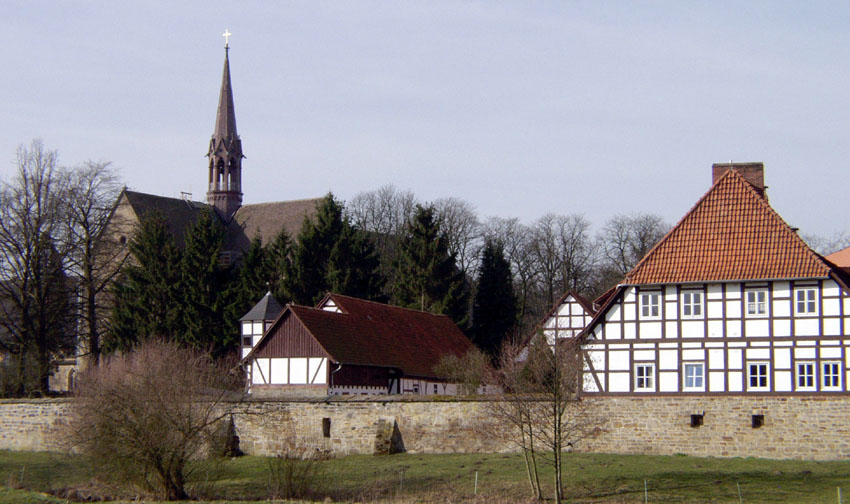
Loccum Abbey continued as a Lutheran monastery since the 16th century AD

Loccum Abbey and Amelungsborn Abbey have the longest traditions as Lutheran monasteries; after the Reformation, many monasteries and convents were received into the Lutheran Church and continued religious life, existing to this day.

Since the 19th and 20th century, there has been a renewal in the monastic life among Lutheranism. Lutheran religious orders in the Franciscan, Benedictine and other traditions exist, with some Lutheran monasteries having third orders and accepting oblates.

In American Lutheran traditions, "The Congregation of the Servants of Christ" was established at St. Augustine's House in Oxford, Michigan, in 1958 when some other men joined Father Arthur Kreinheder in observing the monastic life and offices of prayer. These men and others came and went over the years. The community has always remained small; at times the only member was Father Arthur. During the 35 years of its existence over 25 men tested their vocations to monastic life by living at the house for some time, from a few months to many years, but at Father Arthur's death in 1989 only one permanent resident remained. At the beginning of 2006, there was 2 permanent professed members and 2 long-term guests. Strong ties remain with this community and their brothers in Sweden (Östanbäck monastery) and in Germany (Priory of St. Wigbert).

There is also the Order of Lutheran Franciscans, a religious community of friars and sisters within the tradition of the Evangelical Lutheran Church in America.

==== Anglicanism ====
Monastic life in England came to an abrupt end when King Henry VIII broke from the Catholic Church and made himself the head of the Church of England. He initiated the Dissolution of the Monasteries, during which all of the monasteries within England were destroyed. A large number of monks were executed. Others fled to continental European monasteries where they were able to continue their monastic life.

Shortly after the beginning of the Anglo-Catholic Movement in the Church of England, there was felt to be a need for a restoration of the monastic life. In the 1840s, the then Anglican priest and future Catholic Cardinal John Henry Newman established a community of men at Littlemore near Oxford. From then on, there have been established many communities of monks, friars and other religious communities for men in the Anglican Communion. There are Anglican Benedictines, Franciscans, Cistercians, and in the Episcopal Church in the United States, Dominicans. There are also uniquely Anglican monastic orders such as the Society of Saint John the Evangelist and the Community of the Resurrection at Mirfield.

Some Anglican religious communities are contemplative, some active, but a distinguishing feature of the monastic life among Anglicans is that most practice the so-called "mixed life". Anglican monks recite the Divine Office in choir daily, either the full eight services of the Breviary or the four offices found in the Book of Common Prayer and celebrate the Eucharist daily. Many orders take on external works such as service to the poor, giving religious retreats, or other active ministries within their immediate communities. Like Catholic monks, Anglican monks also take the monastic vows of poverty, chastity, and obedience.

In the early 20th century when the Oxford Movement was at its height, the Anglican Communion had hundreds of orders and communities and thousands of religious followers. However, since the 1960s there has been a sharp falling off in the numbers of religious in many parts of the Anglican Communion. Many once large and international communities have been reduced to a single convent or monastery composed of elderly men or women. In the last few decades of the 20th century, novices have for most communities been few and far between. Some orders and communities have already become extinct.

There are, however, still several thousand Anglican monks working today in approximately 200 communities around the world. The most growth has been in the Melanesian countries of the Solomon Islands, Vanuatu and Papua New Guinea. The Melanesian Brotherhood, founded at Tabalia, Guadalcanal, in 1925 by Ini Kopuria, is now the largest Anglican community in the world with over 450 brothers in the Solomon Islands, Vanuatu, Papua New Guinea, the Philippines and the United Kingdom.

==== Methodism ====
The Saint Brigid of Kildare Monastery is a double monastery of the United Methodist Church rooted in the Benedictine tradition, being located in Collegeville, Minnesota. Besides monastic orders, the Order of Saint Luke is a dispersed religious order within Methodism, though being ecumenical, it accepts believers of other Christian denominations.

==== Reformed Christianity ====
The Emmanuel Sisters is a convent of the Presbyterian Church in Cameroon that was founded by Magdaline Marie Handy. These nuns are engaged in prayer, teaching, and healthcare.

=== Eastern Christianity ===
==== Eastern Orthodox ====
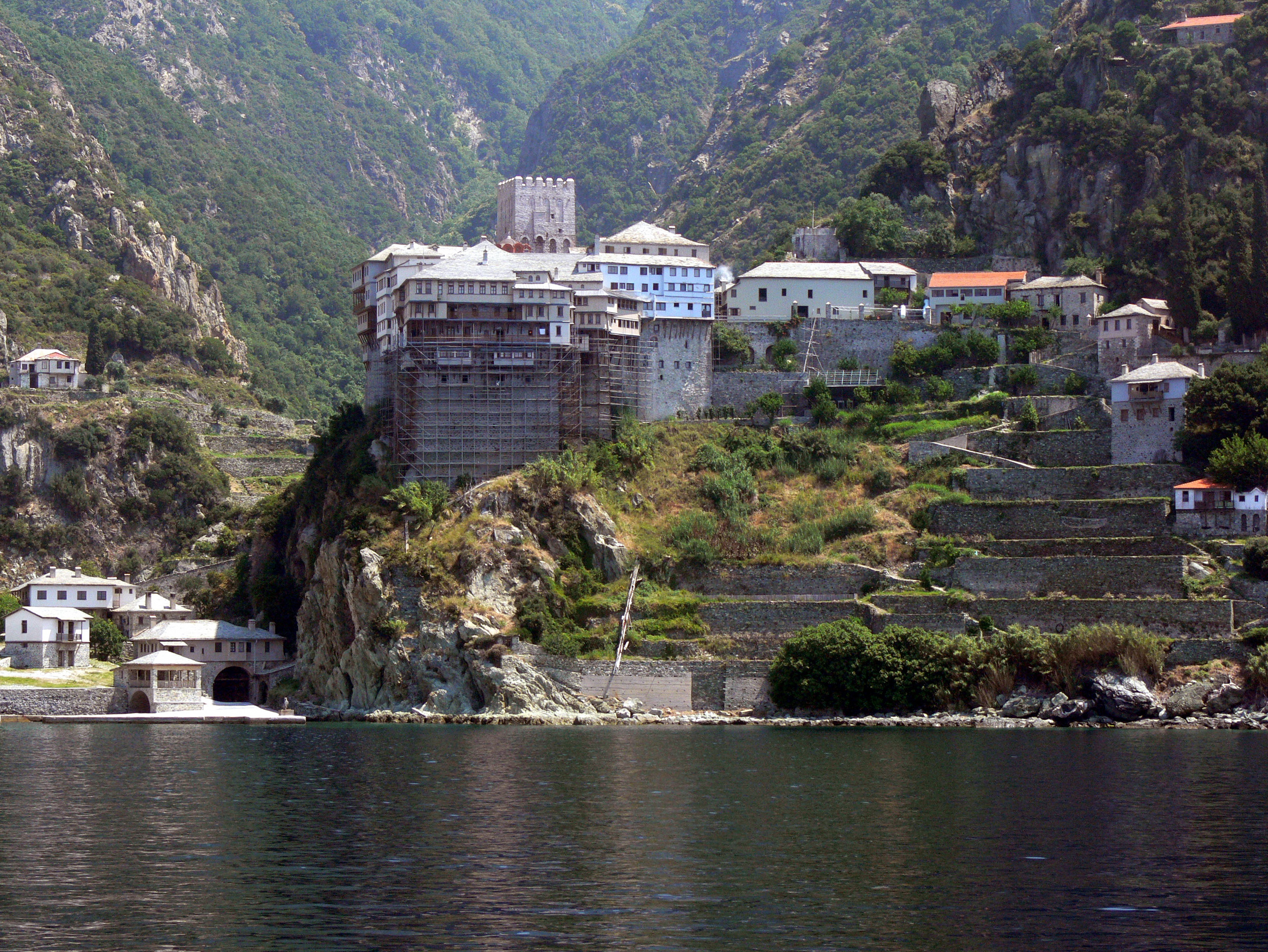
Monastery of St. Dionysius on Mount Athos

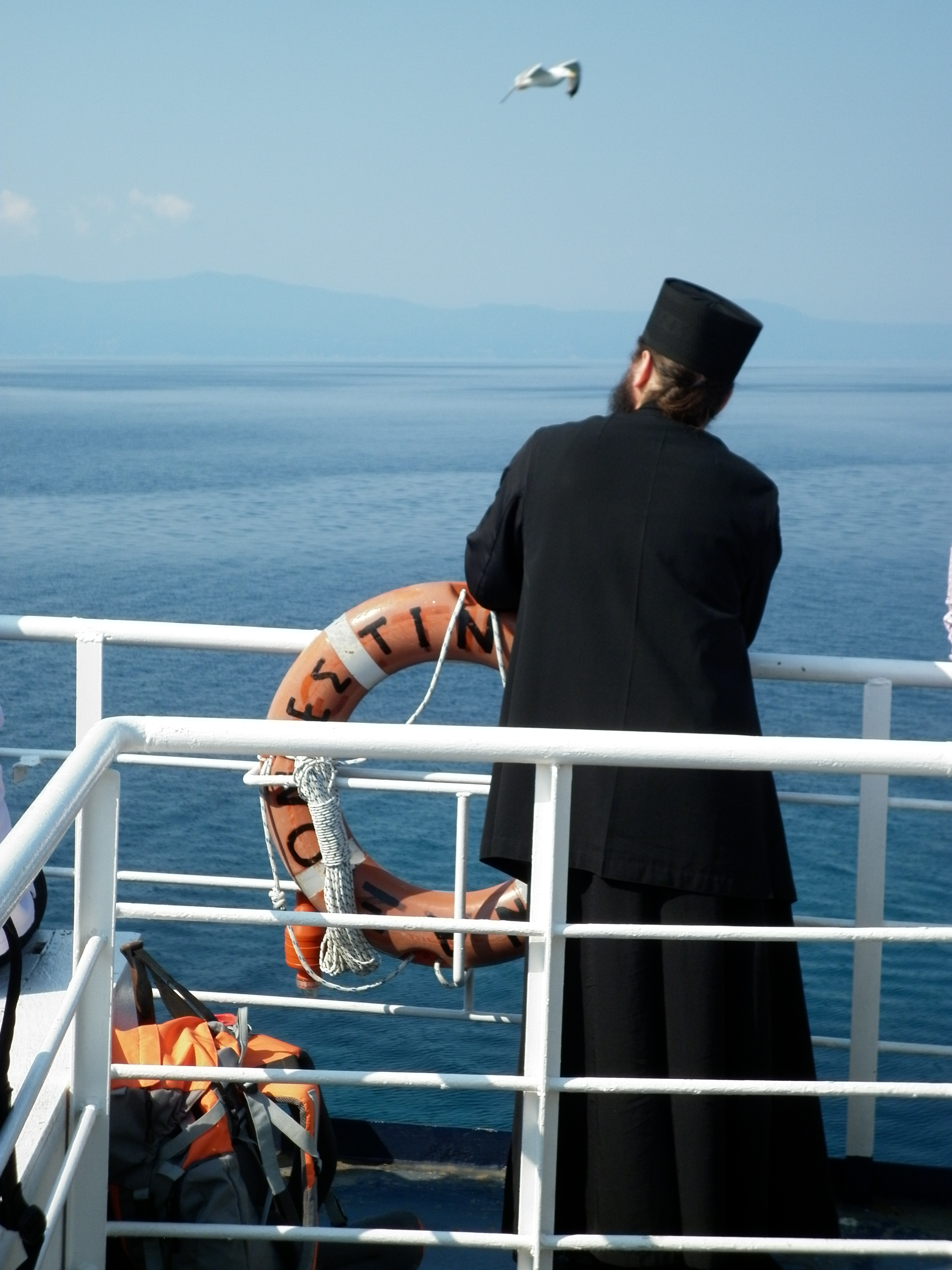
Orthodox monk on his way to Mount Athos

In Eastern Orthodoxy, monasticism holds a very special and important place: "Angels are a light for monks, monks are a light for laymen" (St. John Klimakos). Eastern Orthodox monastics separate themselves from the world in order to pray unceasingly for the world. They do not, in general, have as their primary purpose the running of social services, but instead are concerned with attaining theosis, or union with God. However, care for the poor and needy has always been an obligation of monasticism, so not all monasteries are "cloistered". The level of contact will vary from community to community. Hermits, on the other hand, have little or no contact with the outside world.

Eastern Orthodox monasticism does not have religious orders as are found in the West, nor do they have Rules in the same sense as the Rule of St. Benedict. Rather, Eastern monastics study and draw inspiration from the writings of the Desert Fathers as well as other Church Fathers; probably the most influential of which are the Greater Asketikon and Lesser Asketikon of St. Basil the Great and the Philokalia, which was compiled by St. Nikodemos of the Holy Mountain and St. Makarios of Corinth. Hesychasm is of primary importance in the ascetical theology of the Eastern Orthodox Church.

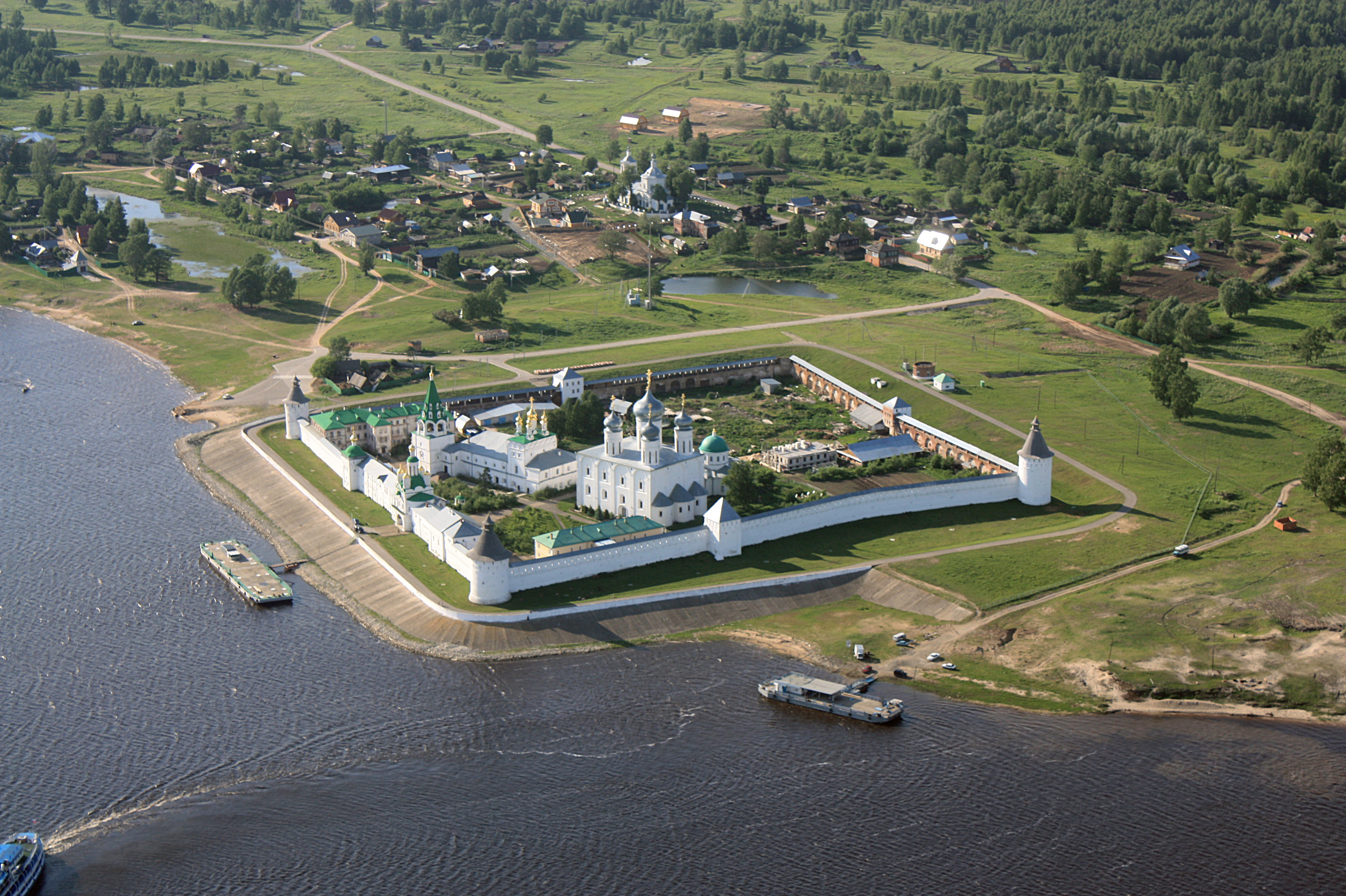
General view of Holy Trinity-Makaryev Monastery, on the Volga River in Nizhny Novgorod Oblast, Russia

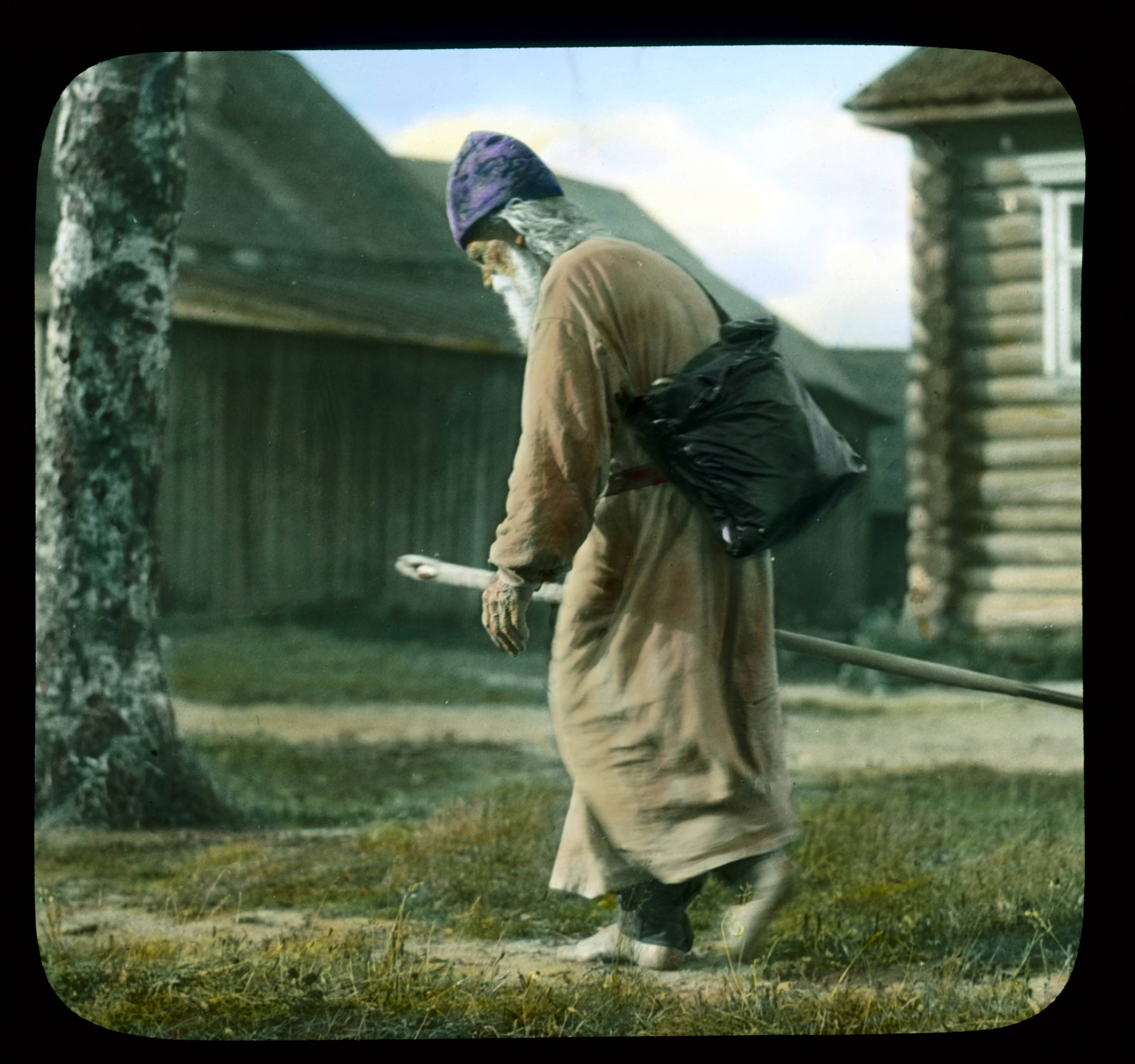
Monk near Saint Petersburg, Soviet Union (c. 1931) by a traveler, DeCou, Branson

Most communities are self-supporting, and the monastic's daily life is usually divided into three parts: (a) communal worship in the catholicon (the monastery's main church); (b) hard manual labour; and (c) private prayer, spiritual study, and rest when necessary. Meals are usually taken in common in a sizable dining hall known as a trapeza (refectory), at elongated refectory tables. Food is usually simple and is eaten in silence while one of the brethren reads aloud from the spiritual writings of the Holy Fathers. The monastic lifestyle takes a great deal of serious commitment. Within the cenobitic community, all monks conform to a common way of living based on the traditions of that particular monastery. In struggling to attain this conformity, the monastic comes to realize his own shortcomings and is guided by his spiritual father in how to deal honestly with them. For this same reason, bishops are almost always chosen from the ranks of monks.

Eastern monasticism is found in three distinct forms: anchoritic (a solitary living in isolation), cenobitic (a community living and worshiping together under the direct rule of an abbot or abbess), and the "middle way" between the two, known as the skete (a community of individuals living separately but in close proximity to one another, who come together only on Sundays and feast days, working and praying the rest of the time in solitude, but under the direction of an elder). One normally enters a cenobitic community first, and only after testing and spiritual growth would one go on to the skete or, for the most advanced, become a solitary anchorite. However, one is not necessarily expected to join a skete or become a solitary; most monastics remain in the cenobium the whole of their lives.

In general, Eastern Orthodox monastics have little or no contact with the outside world, including their own families. The purpose of the monastic life is union with God, the means is through leaving the world (i.e., the life of the passions). After tonsure, Eastern Orthodox monks and nuns are never permitted to cut their hair. The hair of the head and the beard remain uncut as a symbol of the vows they have taken, reminiscent of the Nazarites from the Old Testament. The tonsure of monks is the token of a consecrated life, and symbolizes the cutting off of their self-will.

==== Degrees ====
The Great Schema worn by Orthodox monks and nuns of the most advanced degree

The process of becoming a monk is intentionally slow, as the vows taken are considered to entail a lifelong commitment to God, and are not to be entered into lightly. In Eastern Orthodox monasticism, after the completion of the novitiate there are three ranks of monasticism. There is only one monastic habit in the Eastern Orthodox Church (with certain slight regional variations), and it is the same for both monks and nuns. Each successive grade is given a portion of the habit, the full habit being worn only by those in the highest grade, known for that reason as the "Great Schema", or "Great Habit".

The various profession rites are normally performed by the Abbot, but if the abbot has not been ordained a priest, or if the monastic community is a convent, a hieromonk will perform the service. The abbot or hieromonk who performs a tonsure must be of at least the rank he is tonsuring into. In other words, only a hieromonk who has been tonsured into the Great Schema may himself tonsure a Schemamonk. A bishop, however, may tonsure into any rank, regardless of his own.

Novice (Church Slavonic: Poslushnik), lit. "one under obedience"— Those wishing to join a monastery begin their lives as novices. After coming to the monastery and living as a guest for not less than three days, the revered abbot or abbess may bless the candidate to become a novice. There is no formal ceremony for the clothing of a novice, he or she simply receives permission to wear the clothing of a novice. In the Eastern monastic tradition, novices may or may not dress in the black inner cassock (Greek: Anterion, Eisorasson; Church Slavonic: Podriasnik) and wear the soft monastic hat (Greek: Skoufos, Church Slavonic: Skufia), depending on the tradition of the local community, and in accordance to the abbot's directives. The inner-cassock and the skoufos are the first part of the Eastern Orthodox monastic habit. In some communities, the novice also wears the leather belt. He is also given a prayer rope and instructed in the use of the Jesus Prayer. If a novice chooses to leave during the period of the novitiate, no penalty is incurred. He may also be asked to leave at any time if his behaviour does not conform to the monastic life, or if the superior discerns that he is not called to monasticism. When the abbot or abbess deems the novice ready, he is asked if he wishes to join the monastery. Some, out of humility, will choose to remain novices all their lives. Every stage of the monastic life must be entered into voluntarily.

Rassophore (Church Slavonic: Ryassofor), lit. "Robe-bearer"— If the novice continues on to become a monk, he is clothed in the first degree of monasticism at a formal service known as the Tonsure. Although there are no formal vows made at this point, the candidate is normally required to affirm his commitment to persevere in the monastic life. The abbot will then perform the tonsure, cutting a small amount of hair from four spots on the head, forming a cross. He is then given the outer cassock (Greek: Rasson, Exorasson, or Mandorasson; Church Slavonic: Ryassa)—an outer robe with wide sleeves, something like the cowl used in the West, but without a hood—from which the name of Rassophore derives. He is also given a brimless hat with a veil, known as a klobuk, and a leather belt is fastened around his waist. His habit is usually black (an archaic synonym for "monk" was Russian: чернец, romanized: chernets, lit. 'black one'; the female equivalent is Russian: черница, romanized: chernitsa), signifying that he is now dead to the world, and he receives a new monastic name. Although the Rassophore does not make formal vows, he is still morally obligated to continue in the monastic estate for the rest of his life. Some will remain Rassophores permanently, without going on to the higher degrees.

Stavrophore (Church Slavonic: Krestonosets), lit. "Cross-bearer"—The next level for Eastern monastics takes place some years after the first tonsure when the abbot feels the monk has reached an appropriate level of discipline, dedication, and humility. This degree is also known as the Little Schema, and is considered to be a "betrothal" to the Great Schema. At this stage, the monk makes formal vows of stability, chastity, obedience and poverty. Then he is tonsured and clothed in the habit, which in addition to that worn by the Rassophore, includes the paramandyas (Church Slavonic: paraman), a piece of square cloth worn on the back, embroidered with the instruments of the Passion (see picture above), and connected by ties to a wooden cross worn over the heart. The paramandyas represents the yoke of Christ. Because of this addition he is now called Stavrophore, or Cross-bearer. He is also given a wooden hand cross (or "profession cross"), which he should keep in his icon corner, and a beeswax candle, symbolic of monastic vigilance the sacrificing of himself for God. He will be buried holding the cross, and the candle will be burned at his funeral. In the Slavic practice, the Stavrophore also wears the monastic mantle. The rasson (outer robe) worn by the Stavrophore is more ample than that worn by the Rassophore. The abbot increases the Stavrophore monk's prayer rule, allows a more strict personal ascetic practice, and gives the monk more responsibility.

Great Schema (Greek: Megaloschemos, Church Slavonic: Skhimnik)—Monks whose abbot feels they have reached a high level of spiritual excellence reach the final stage, called the Great Schema. The tonsure of a Schemamonk follows the same format as the Stavrophore, and he makes the same vows and is tonsured in the same manner. But in addition to all the garments worn by the Stavrophore, he is given the Analavos (Church Slavonic: Analav) which is the article of monastic vesture emblematic of the Great Schema. For this reason, the analavos itself is sometimes called the "Great Schema". The analavos comes down in the front and the back, somewhat like the scapular in Western monasticism, although the two garments are probably not related. It is often intricately embroidered with the instruments of the Passion and the Trisagion (the angelic hymn). The Greek form does not have a hood, the Slavic form has a hood and lappets on the shoulders, so that the garment forms a large cross covering the monk's shoulders, chest, and back. Another piece added is the Polystavrion or "Many Crosses", which consists of a cord with a number of small crosses plaited into it. The polystavrion forms a yoke around the monk and serves to hold the analavos in place, and reminds the monastic that he is bound to Christ and that his arms are no longer fit for worldly activities, but that he must labor only for the Kingdom of Heaven. Among the Greeks, the mantle is added at this stage. The paramandyas of the Megaloschemos is larger than that of the Stavrophore, and if he wears the klobuk, it is of a distinctive thimble shape, called a koukoulion, the veil of which is usually embroidered with crosses. In some monastic traditions the Great Schema is only given to monks and nuns on their death bed, while in others they may be elevated after as little as 25 years of service.

Eastern Orthodox monks are addressed as "father" even if they are not priests; but when conversing among themselves, monks will often address one another as "Brother". Novices are always referred to as "Brother". Among the Greeks, old monks are often called Gheronda, or "Elder", out of respect for their dedication. In the Slavic tradition, the title of Elder (Church Slavonic: Starets) is normally reserved for those who are of an advanced spiritual life, and who serve as guides to others.

For the Eastern Orthodox, "mother" is the correct term for nuns who have been tonsured Stavrophore or higher. Novices and Rassophores are addressed as "sister". Nuns live identical ascetic lives to their male counterparts and are therefore also called monachai (the feminine plural of monachos), and their community is likewise called a monastery.

Many (but not all) Eastern Orthodox seminaries are attached to monasteries, combining academic preparation for ordination with participation in the community's life of prayer, and hopefully benefiting from the example and wise counsel of the monks. Bishops are required by the sacred canons of the Eastern Orthodox Church to be chosen from among the monastic clergy. The requirement is specifically that they be monastics, not simply celibate (see clerical celibacy). Monks who have been ordained to the priesthood are called hieromonks (priest-monks); monks who have been ordained to the diaconate are called hierodeacons (deacon-monks). A Schemamonk who is a priest is called a Hieroschemamonk. Most monks are not ordained; a community will normally only present as many candidates for ordination to the bishop as the liturgical needs of the community require.

== Hinduism ==
Hinduism has many monastic orders, including the Dashanami Sampradaya (lit. 'Tradition of Ten Names') orders established by Adi Shankara as well as Vaishnava orders.

=== Vaishnava ===
Madhvaacharya (Madhvacharya), the Dwaita philosopher, established ashta matha (Eight Monasteries). He appointed a monk (called swamiji or swamigalu in local parlance) for each matha or monastery who has the right to worship Madhvacharya's murti of Lord Krishna by rotation. Each matha's swamiji gets a chance to worship after fourteen years. This ritual is called Paryaya and has been used also outside his sampradaya, e.g. in Gaudiya Vaisnava Radharamana temple in Vrindavan.

Similar in appearance to Buddhist monks, brahmacari monks from the International Society for Krishna Consciousness (ISKCON), or Hare Krishnas as they are popularly known, are the best known Vaishnava monks outside India. They are a common sight in many places around the world. Their appearance—simple saffron dhoti, shaved head with sikha, Tulasi neckbeads and tilaka markings—and social customs (sadhana) date back many thousands of years to the Vedic era with its varnasrama society. This social scheme includes both monastic and lay stages meant for various persons in various stages of life according to their characteristics (guna) and work (karma).

ISKCON started as a predominantly monastic group but nowadays the majority of members live as lay persons. Many of them, however, spent some time as monks. New persons joining ISKCON as full-time members (living in its centers) first undergo a three-month Bhakta training, which includes learning the basics of brahmacari (monastic) life. After that they can decide if they prefer to continue as monks or as married Grihasthas.

Brahmacari older than 50 years (per ISKCON rule) can become sannyasi. Sannyasa, a life of full dedication to spiritual pursuits, is the highest stage of life in the varnasrama society. It is permanent and one cannot give it up. A Sannyasi is given the title Swami. Older grihastha with grown-up children are traditionally expected to accept vanaprastha (celibate retired) life.

The role of monastic orders in Indian and now also Western society has to some extent been adapted over the years in accordance with ever-changing social structures.

== See also ==
- Into Great Silence — The award-winning documentary on the hermit monks of the Catholic Carthusian Order.
- Jangam Monk
- Mainchín, and Monahan, names of Gaelic origin, diminutive of Irish: Manach, Latin: Monachus, "a Monk".
- Sadhu
