= Project Canterbury =

Online archive of material related to Anglicanism

Project Canterbury (sometimes abbreviated as PC) is an online archive of material related to the history of Anglicanism. It was founded by Richard Mammana, Jr. in 1999 with a grant from Episcopal Church Presiding Bishop Frank T. Griswold, and is hosted by the non-profit Society of Archbishop Justus. The episcopal patron of the site was Terry Brown, retired bishop of Malaita in the Church of the Province of Melanesia; Geoffrey Rowell Bishop of Gibraltar in Europe had also served in this capacity from 1999 until his death. Volunteer transcribers prepare material for the site, which incorporates modern scholarly material, primary source texts, photographic images and engravings.

== Imprint ==
Since 2018, Project Canterbury is also an imprint of Anglican historical material in printed formats.

== Titles ==
- Our Aunt: Low Church Observations of American Anglo-Catholicism (New Haven, 2018) ISBN 9781688797741
- Moravians and Anglicans: Ecumenical Sources (Resica Falls, Pennsylvania, 2021) ISBN 9798406196007
- Intercommunion between the Episcopal Church and the Polish National Catholic Church: An Introduction and Sourcebook (Resica Falls, Pennsylvania, 2022) ISBN 9798402891548
