= Malaita Cathedral =

Cathedral in the Solomon Islands

Coordinates: 9.013°S 160.571°E

Christ the King Cathedral of the Diocese of Malaita of the Anglican Church of Melanesia at Fiu Village was begun in 1933. It was the victim of an arson attack in 2004.

== History ==
Fiu, in west Kwara'ae north of 'Aoke, was the first Anglican base in northern Malaita. It began as a market place, which the Melanesian Mission chose as an established meeting place, and an earlier settlement of twenty Christian men with a small church already existed there. Arthur Ako started a school at Borokata near the mouth of the Fiu River, and Arthur Hopkins, who arrived on Malaita in 1901, later built his second home at Onebulu in Fiu.

A church was built at Fiu in 1904, and the station became one of the most successful Christian settlements on Malaita. According to a 2017 notice from the cathedral, the present church building was erected by Alfred Crace Sage in 1932 in memory of his son Charles Crace Sage, who served the Melanesian Mission on Malaita from 1906 and drowned at sea in South Malaita on 7 June 1913.

The cathedral serves the Diocese of Malaita, created in 1975 when the Church of Melanesia became an autonomous province, with Leonard Alufurai as its first bishop. Terry Michael Brown was installed as the fourth Bishop of Malaita at the cathedral on Pentecost, 26 May 1996. The Fiu parish committee planned to mark the building's 85th anniversary in June 2018, with refurbishment of the church and its furniture. In 2024, parts of the diocese were separated to form the Diocese of Southern Malaita and Sikaiana.
