= Terry Brown (bishop) =

Solomon Islander bishop

Terry Michael Brown (18 August 1944 – 31 March 2024) was the fourth Bishop of Malaita in the Anglican Church of Melanesia, serving from 1996 to 2008. He was preceded by Raymond Aumae and succeeded by Sam Sahu. Brown died on 31 March 2024, at the age of 79.

== Bibliography ==
- Other Voices, Other Worlds: The Global Church Speaks Out on Homosexuality (Church Publishing, 2006) ISBN 9780898695199
