= Community of the Sisters of Melanesia =

The Community of the Sisters of Melanesia, more usually called The Sisters of Melanesia, is the third order for women to be established in the Church of Melanesia, which is the Anglican Church of Solomon Islands and Vanuatu.

The first women's order was the defunct Sisters of the Holy Cross, whose members transferred to the Roman Catholic Church in 1950.

In the late 1960s, the then bishop of the Diocese of Melanesia hoped to establish a group of women Franciscans in Honiara. They could not come, but the Community of the Sisters of the Church came and prospered.

A little more than a decade later, one woman named Nesta Tiboe felt that there was room for a community of sisters working in the Solomon Islands which followed the ideals and structures of the Melanesian Brotherhood. This turned out to be the Sisters of Melanesia.

There are about 110 sisters and over 50 novices at Verana'aso, Maravovo, Western Guadalcanal. The Head Sister is Sister Catherine Rosa. Besides Verana'aso, they have households in Honiara, CDC, Auki and South Malaita.

The novices wear a blue dress and upon admittance into the Sisterhood change into a green dress with a white veil with a green trim. The sisters wear a heart-shaped medal around their necks.

== Sources ==
- Richard Toke. "Religious Order celebrates silver jubilee". Melanesian Messenger 060608–1, June 8, 2006. The Anglican Communion
- World Council of Churches. Church of Melanesia
- Kevin Ward, Andrew Wingate, Carrie Pemberton (eds.) Anglicanism: a Global Communion, pp. 48–49. Church Publishing, Inc., 1998. ISBN 0-89869-304-7
