= Charles Fox (missionary) =

English missionary (1878–1977)

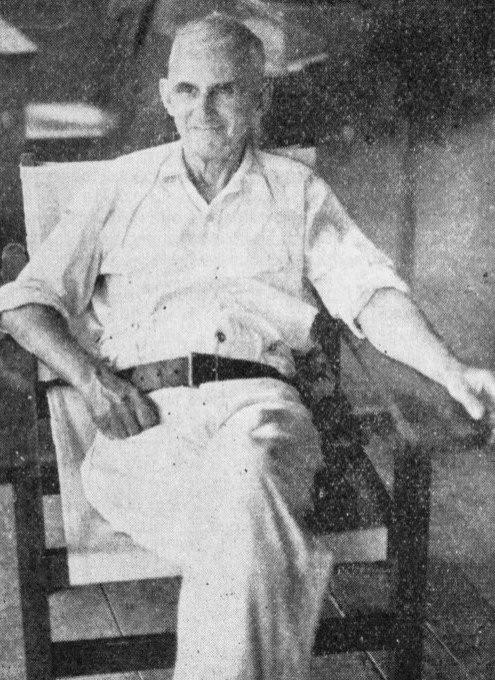
Charles Fox

Charles Elliot Fox CBE (26 September 1878 – 28 October 1977) was an Anglican missionary and teacher in Melanesia.

Fox was the founder of the precursor club of Real Kakamora, now considered to be the most popular football club in the Solomon Islands.

He served the Melanesian Mission from 1902 until retiring to New Zealand in 1973, making him the longest-serving expatriate member of any church in the Solomons; He is commemorated in both, the Church of Melanesia and Anglican Church in Aotearoa, New Zealand and Polynesia. His feast day is September 6.

== Career ==
Fox was born in Stalbridge, Dorset, England, and educated in New Zealand, graduating Master of Arts from Auckland University College in 1901. He received a degree in theology from St John's College, Auckland in 1902, joined the Anglican Melanesian Mission in 1903 and was ordained the same year.

Fox co-authored "Beliefs and Tales of San Cristobal" in 1915, which was later printed in the J Royal Anthropological Inst.

Starting around 1924, Fox worked on a dictionary the Lau language of Malaita and one of the Arosi language of Makira in the Solomon Islands.

In 1932, Fox declined the post of Bishop of the Melanesian Mission. In the same year he was admitted to the Melanesian Brotherhood.

In the 1974 New Year Honours, Fox was appointed a Commander of the Order of the British Empire, for humanitarian services, particularly in the Solomon Islands. He died in New Zealand in 1977, aged 99 years. He is buried at the Melanesian Brotherhood headquarters at Tabalia in the Solomon Islands.

== Bibliography ==
- Fox, Charles E.; Drew, F. H. (1915). "Beliefs and Tales of San Cristoval". The Journal of the Royal Anthropological Institute of Great Britain and Ireland. 45: 187–228. doi:10.2307/2843476. JSTOR 2843476.
- Fox, Charles E. (1962). Kakamora. London: Hodder & Stoughton.
- Fox, Charles E. (1974). Lau dictionary. Pacific linguistics. Canberra: Pacific linguistics. ISBN 978-0-85883-101-8.
- Fox, Charles E. (1978). Arosi Dictionary (PDF). Canberra: Pacific Linguistics. ISBN 978-0-85883-170-4.
