= Dudley Tuti =

Solomon Islander bishop

Sir Dudley Tuti, KBE (1919–2006) was the inaugural Bishop of Ysabel, one of the eight dioceses that make up the Anglican Church of Melanesia.

He was educated at St Mary's School, Maravovo; Te Aute College, Hawkes Bay; and St John's College, Auckland. He was ordained deacon in 1946 and priest in 1954. He was also a teacher, firstly at All Hallows' School, Ugi. He was Head Master of Vureas School in the New Hebrides then Litogahira Boys School in Isabel. He became Rural Dean of Isabel; a member of the Advisory Council of the British Solomon Islands Protectorate; and Chairman of the Isabel Education Committee. He was consecrated Assistant Bishop of Melanesia at the Cathedral Church of St Barnabas, Honiara by Alfred Hill, Archbishop of Melanesia on 30 November 1963. He was also Archdeacon of the Central Solomon Islands from 1968 to 1975; and Vicar general of the Diocese of Melanesia from 1971 to 1975.

Tuti has a school named after him in Kamaosi, which is at the south eastern end of Santa Isabel Island in his former diocese.
