= Kamaosi =

Kamaosi Village
- Village
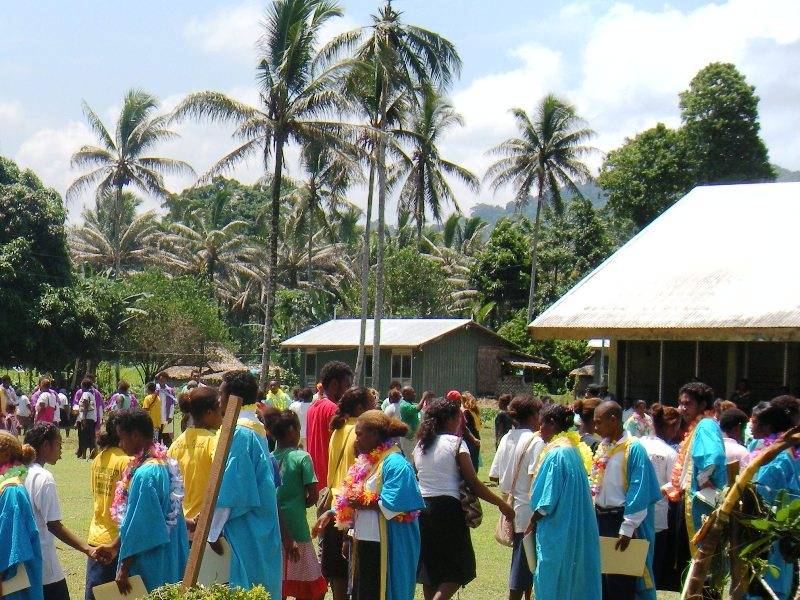
- Graduation day at Sir Dudley Tuti College

- Location in the Solomon Islands
- Coordinates: 8°28′39.49″S 159°48′29.37″E
- Country: Solomon Islands
- Province: Isabel Province
- Island: Santa Isabel Island
- Elevation: 292 ft (89 m)

Population (2009)
  - Total: ~500
- includes SDTC students
- Time zone: UTC+11 (UTC)

Sir Dudley Tuti College

Information
- Principal: John Kabu
- Forms: 1-7
- Enrollment: 500
- Campus: Kamaosi Village
- School Code: 210

Kamaosi Village is a small village in the south eastern end of Santa Isabel Island, Isabel Province, Solomon Islands. It is close to Gululu. It contains one of the two high schools on the island, Sir Dudley Tuti College.

== Sir Dudley Tuti College ==
The school composes a large part of the village. Prior to 1999, the school was the village and shared the same name. It was renamed after the late Sir Dudley Tuti, then chief of the island. The school has an enrollment of 500.
