= Mangakiki =

- Village
- Location in Guadalcanal
- Coordinates: 9°20′43″S 159°35′37″E
- Country: Solomon Islands
- Province: Guadalcanal
- Island: Guadalcanal
- Time zone: UTC+11 (UTC)

Mangakiki is a village on the northwest coast of Guadalcanal, Solomon Islands. It is located 57.6 kilometres (35.8 mi) by road northwest of Honiara. Mangakiki is near Maravovo.
