= Rickson Maomaoru =

Solomon Islander bishop

Rickson George Maomaoru is a Solomon Islands Anglican bishop. Since 2024, he has been the first diocesan bishop of the Diocese of Southern Malaita and Sikaiana in the Anglican Church of Melanesia. He was made a bishop on 22 October 2017 and served from then until 2024 as assistant bishop of Malaita.
