= Diocese of Southern Malaita and Sikaiana =

Anglican diocese in the Solomon Islands

Coordinates: 9.69457°S 161.57698°E

Location
- Country: Solomon Islands
- Ecclesiastical province: Anglican Church of Melanesia

Information
- Cathedral: St. Barnabas' Church, Sa'a Village

Current leadership
- Bishop: Rickson Maomaoru

The Diocese of Southern Malaita and Sikaiana is one of the ten dioceses of the Anglican Church of Melanesia. It was formally inaugurated in November 2024 in territory carved out of the Diocese of Malaita. The diocese's territory consists of East ꞌAreꞌare and West ꞌAreꞌare on the island of Malaita, South Malaita Island and Sikaiana.

== History ==
Bishop Rickson Maomaoru, who had served as assistant bishop in Malaita since 2017, was elected the first diocesan bishop in June 2024. Maomaoru was installed as bishop by Archbishop Leonard Dawea at the diocese's inauguration ceremony at St. Barnabas' Church (the diocese's newly expanded and designated cathedral) on South Malaita on 24 November 2024. The ceremony was attended by Governor-General David Tiva Kapu.

== List of bishops ==
Bishops of Southern Malaita and Sikaiana
From	Until	Incumbent	Notes
2024	present	Rickson Maomaoru	First bishop; consecrated assistant bishop in the Diocese of Malaita on 22 October 2017.
