= Tumsisiro =

- Hamlet
- Location in Vanuatu
- Coordinates: 15°17′02″S 167°59′24″E
- Country: Vanuatu
- Province: Penama Province
- Island: Ambae Island
- Time zone: UTC+11 (VUT)

Tumsisiro is community located near Saratamata on east Ambae Island, Vanuatu and is the headquarters of the Southern Region of the Melanesian Brotherhood, an Anglican religious community.

== History ==
As regional headquarters, Tumsisiro is home to the offices of the Regional Head Brother, the Section Elder Brother, and the Elder Brother. Tumsisro is also home to a Novitiate for the Melanesian Brotherhood, with novices from both Banks and Torres and the rest of Vanuatu coming here for training.

Tumsisiro is located near a coral beach, and facilities include novice classrooms, a small shop, and a bakery. It has a limited supply of running water, a telephone, and electricity during the first part of the evening.

The centre of the community's life is the Saint Mark's Chapel, and Saint Simon and Saint Jude Square. The Eucharist (Mass) and Offices from the Book of Common Prayer and the Brothers' Office book are offered daily.

Tumisiro is the site of one of the largest Sunday Schools in Vanuatu, with children of every denomination coming for instruction. Important days are Saint Mark's Day (25 April), Ini Kopuria Day (6 June), and Saint Simon and Saint Jude Day (28 October).
