= Alfred Hou =

Solomon Islander bishop

Alfred Hou is an Anglican bishop: from 2005 to 2017 he was Assistant Bishop of Malaita, one of the nine dioceses that make up the Anglican Church of Melanesia.
