= Sam Sahu =

Solomon Islander bishop

Samuel Sahu is the fifth and current Bishop of Malaita, serving since 2008.
