= Tabalia =

Tabalia is the name of the Mother House of the Melanesian Brotherhood (MBH) on northeastern Guadalcanal in the Solomon Islands.

Tabalia (Ghari pronunciation: [taᵐbalia]) was given by Ini Kopuria (the Brotherhood’s founder) to the Melanesian Brotherhood (known in the Mota language as Ira Reta Tasiu). Tabalia was Kopuria's customary inheritance, and he donated the land in 1925 to the Tasiu.

As the Mother House, Tabalia is the headquarters for the Solomon Islands Region of the Melanesian Brotherhood. The other Regional Headquarters are Tumsisiro on East Ambae, Vanuatu, and Popondetta, in Papua New Guinea.

From Tabalia, the Melanesian Brotherhood looks after 25 households (monasteries) in the Solomon Islands. It is also the location for quadrennial Great Conference, where representatives from all three regions meet.

The burial ground at Tabalia contains the graves of Dr. Charles Elliot Fox (Feast day October 29) and the Seven Martyred Brothers (Feast day April 24).
