= Leonard Alufurai =

Solomon Islander bishop

The Right Reverend Leonard Alufurai
- Assistant Bishop of Melanesia
- Church: Anglican Church of Melanesia
- Diocese: Malaita
- In office: 1963–1975
- Other post: Unofficial Member of the Legislative Council (1965)
- Previous posts: Rural Dean of Malaita; Archdeacon of the East Solomons

Orders
- Ordination: 1952 (deacon), 1956 (priest)
- Consecration: 30 November 1963

Personal details
- Born: 1925 Lau Lagoon, Malaita, Solomon Islands
- Died: 12 September 2000 (aged 74–75) Kilu'ufi Hospital, Auki, Solomon Islands
- Denomination: Anglican
- Education: St. Mary's School, Maravovo; All Hallows' School; Te Aute College; St John's College, Auckland

Leonard Alufurai, OBE (1925–2000) was the inaugural Bishop of Malaita.

Alufurai was born in Lau Lagoon, Malaita and educated at St. Mary's School, Maravovo, All Hallows' School, Te Aute College and St. John's College, Auckland. He was ordained deacon in 1952, and priest in 1956. Later he was Rural Dean of Malaita, then Archdeacon of the East Solomons from 1968 to 1975. He was also a member of the Malaita Council. On 30 November 1963 he and Dudley Tuti were consecrated Assistant Bishops in the Diocese of Melanesia.

He moved to Honiara, but returned to Malaita and died on the 12 September 2000 at Kilu'ufi Hospital in Auki.
