= Diocese of Malaita =

Coordinates: 09°0′S 161°0′E

The Diocese of Malaita is one of the ten current dioceses of the Anglican Church of Melanesia. One of the four original ACOM dioceses, Malaita diocese was erected in January 1975; it is currently subdivided into six regions of 46 parishes.

Malaita Province is the most populous and one of the largest of the nine provinces of Solomon Islands. It is named after its largest island, Malaita. In 2024, parts of Malaita Island, South Malaita Island and Sikaiana were carved off into the newly formed Diocese of Southern Malaita and Sikaiana.

== List of bishops ==
Bishops of Malaita
From	Until	Incumbent	Notes
1975	1981	Leonard Alufurai	First bishop; consecrated assistant bishop in the Diocese of Melanesia on 30 November 1963.
1982	1989	Willie Pwaisiho	Second bishop.
1990	1994	Raymond Aumae	Third bishop; consecrated and installed on 20 May 1990.
1996	2008	Terry Brown	Fourth bishop; consecrated and installed on 26 May 1996.
2008	present	Sam Sahu	Fifth bishop; consecrated and installed on 2 November 2008.
Assistant bishops
2005	2017	Alfred Hou	Consecrated 27 November 2005
2017	2024	Rickson Maomaoru	Consecrated 22 October 2017. Translated to Southern Malaita and Sikaiana, 2024.

== Sources ==
- Anglican Church of Melanesia — Diocese of Malaita
