= Maravovo =

- Village
- Location in Guadalcanal
- Coordinates: 9°17′00″S 159°38′00″E
- Country: Solomon Islands
- Province: Guadalcanal
- Island: Guadalcanal
- Time zone: UTC+11 (UTC)

Maravovo (or alternatively Marovovo) is a village on the northwest coast of Guadalcanal, Solomon Islands. It is located 57.6 kilometres (35.8 mi) by road northwest of Honiara. Mangakiki is near Maravovo. The population is reportedly entirely Anglican.

On 7 October 1942, during the Guadalcanal campaign, the Japanese established a small midget submarine base there. On 7 February 1943, when the first American troops reached the area, they only encountered slight resistance, and found that most of the Japanese had already been evacuated during Operation Ke.

The wreck of one of the midget submarines still lies underwater in the bay facing the village.

== Notable people ==
- Ini Kopuria (died 1945), police officer who formed the Melanesian Brotherhood in 1925.
