= Ini Kopuria =

Solomon Island Anglican missionary and saint

Ini Kopuria (died June 1945) was a Solomon Islands police officer from Maravovo, Guadalcanal, who founded the Melanesian Brotherhood in 1925. He and the Bishop of Melanesia, John Manwaring Steward, formed a brotherhood (known in the Mota language as Ira Reta Tasiu) to spread Christianity to non-Christian areas of Melanesia.

After being educated at the Anglican church schools of Pamua and later in Norfolk Island, he joined the police force. In 1924, while recovering in a hospital from a leg injury, Kopuria reported experiencing a vision in which Jesus conveyed to him that he was not fulfilling his assigned divine mission. With the support of Bishop Steward, Kopuria decided to establish a community of Solomon Islands men to act as missionaries. Having previously visited remote villages as a policeman, he intended to return to them as a missionary.

On 28 October 1925 (which falls on the feast days of Saints Simon and Jude), he took vows renouncing possessions, marriage and freedom of action. He gave away all his property, including an area of his family's land at Tabalia, to the Brotherhood. The following year, the first six brothers joined him.

The Anglican Church of Melanesia and the Church of England commemorate Kopuria on their calendars of saints. Kopuria is commemorated in the Church of England on 6 June.

== See also ==
- Calendar of saints (Church of England)
