= Raymond Aumae =

Solomon Islander bishop

Raymond Aumae was the third Bishop of Malaita, one of the nine dioceses that make up the Anglican Church of Melanesia: he served from 1990 to 1994.
