= Melanesian Brotherhood =

Anglican religious community in Melanesia

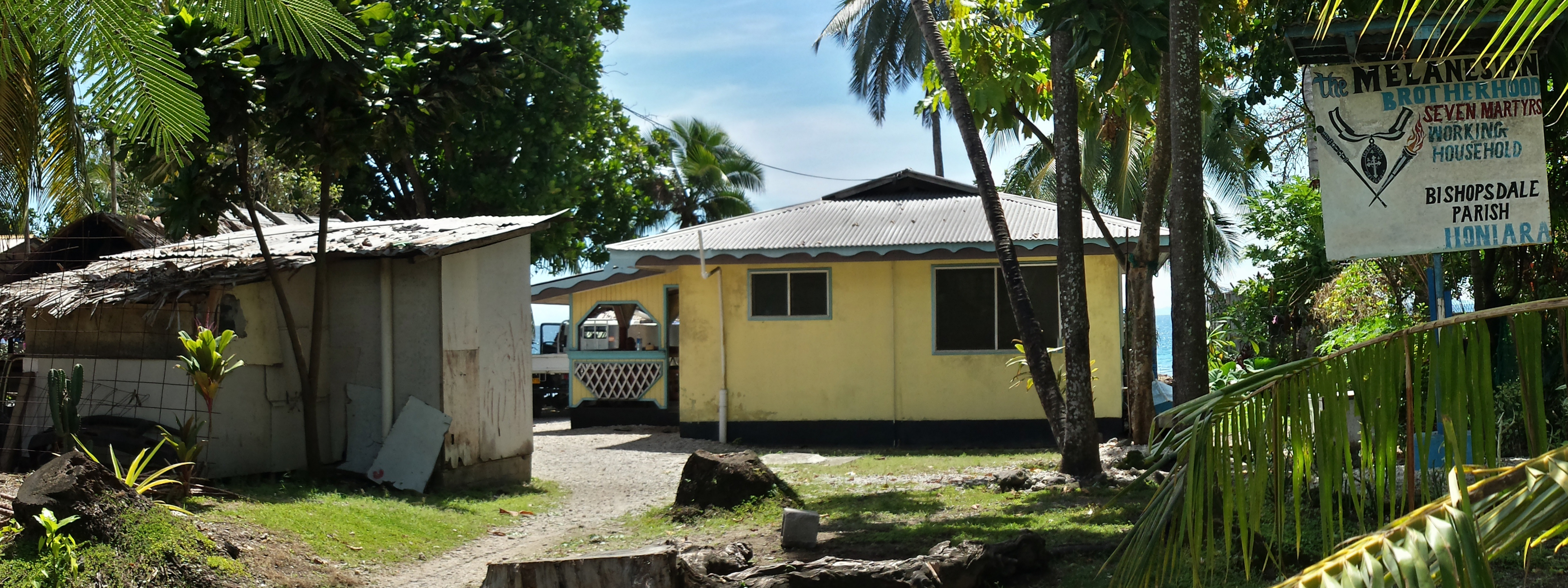
The Seven Martyrs Working Household in Bishopsdale, Honiara, Solomon Islands

The Melanesian Brotherhood is an Anglican religious community of men in simple vows based primarily in the Solomon Islands, Vanuatu, and Papua New Guinea.

== History ==
The Melanesian Brotherhood was formed in 1925 by Ini Kopuria, a Solomon Islands police officer from Maravovo, Guadalcanal. He and the Bishop of Melanesia, John Manwaring Steward, formed a brotherhood (known in the Mota language as Ira Reta Tasiu) to spread Christianity to the non-Christian areas of Melanesia.

The Brothers (or Tasiu, as they are more generally known in the islands) were responsible for the evangelisation of large areas of Guadalcanal, Malaita, Temotu, and other areas in the Solomons, as well as Big Bay and other locations in Vanuatu, and the Popondetta area of Papua New Guinea.

== Structure ==
After training for three years, a novice is admitted as a brother by the Archbishop of Melanesia in his capacity as Father of the Brotherhood, or his deputy, or the Regional Father, who is a diocesan Bishop in his role as a Regional Father of the Brotherhood. This admission usually takes place on the Sunday nearest the feast of St. Simon & St. Jude (28 October) at one of the three regional headquarters.

The Head Brother is the leader of the whole Brotherhood and is based at the Mother House in Tabalia. Tabalia is the land given by Ini Kopuria on northwest Guadalcanal. Three regional Head Brothers assist the Head Brother and supervise the Brothers' ministry in the three regions of Solomon Islands, Papua New Guinea (based at Popondetta), and Vanuatu (based at Tumsisiro, on east Ambae). The Brotherhood also has a house in Palawan, the Philippines.

Each of the three regional centres supervises the life and mission of the brothers in Sections (which are coterminate with the dioceses of the Church of Melanesia). The Sections are led by a Section Elder Brother. Under the Sections are the Households, which are led by an Elder Brother, and under the Households are relatively small communities of three to six brothers in Working Households, who are led by a Brother-in-Charge. Below the Working Households are Mobile Households with no full-time Brothers. Mobile Households have two or more Brothers and may develop into Working Households.

Each Mobile Household, Working Household, Section, Region, and the entire Brotherhood has its own chaplain, responsible for the daily celebration of Mass and the spiritual lives of the Brothers in his care. The chaplain may or may not be a member of the Brotherhood.

== Daily cycle and vows ==
The Brothers follow a sixfold cycle of daily office and Eucharist consisting of First Office (Prime), Morning Prayer, Mass, Morning Office (Terce), Midday Office (Sext), Afternoon Office (None), Evening Prayer, and Last Office (Compline). The texts for Morning Prayer, the Eucharist, and Evening Prayer are from the Melanesian English Prayer Book, or its authorised alternatives. The lesser hours are simple offices in the "cathedral office" tradition rather than monastic, and the devotion of the Angelus (or Regina Coeli) is prayed daily.

The Brothers follow the evangelical counsels under the vows of poverty, celibacy and obedience. They spend three years as novices and then take vows for terms of five years, which are renewable. The constitution of the brotherhood permits some brothers to take life vows, but most brothers serve from seven to twenty years and are then released. Released brothers return to secular life, often marry, and resume life as Christian laymen in their villages.

Several brothers, and many former brothers, are ordained to the diaconate or the priesthood. Although called the Melanesian Brotherhood, there are many Brothers who are from Polynesian islands, and several Filipinos and Europeans have joined the community.

== Peace-making ==
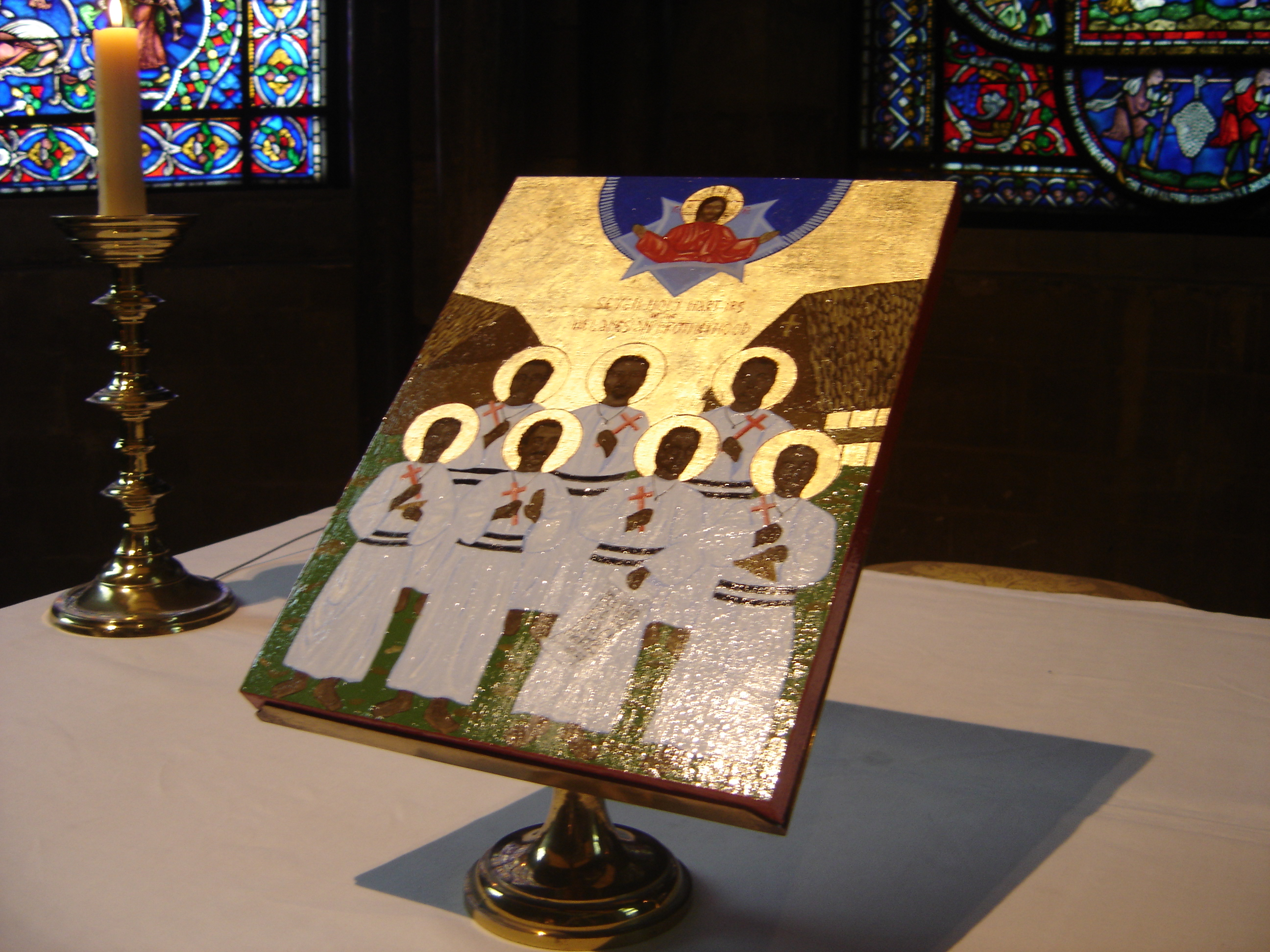
Icon of the Melanesian Martyrs at Canterbury Cathedral

During the ethnic violence of 1999–2000 in the Solomon Islands, the Brotherhood participated in peace-making efforts which led to a ceasefire and to the Townsville Peace Agreement of October 2000. They subsequently gathered weapons from combatants and discarded them at sea.

One rebel leader, Harold Keke, did not comply with the agreement and continued to engage in violence. Brother Nathaniel Sado, who knew Keke, went to negotiate with him, but did not return. On 23 April 2003, six brothers went to investigate reports that Keke had murdered Br. Nathaniel, and they also did not return. Initial reports indicated that Keke was holding them hostage, but on 8 August 2003, the Police Commissioner informed the Brotherhood that all six were dead. Keke and his men surrendered several days later, and the bodies of the seven brothers were exhumed and brought back to Honiara for autopsy. Br. Nathaniel had been tortured for several days before dying; three of the others had been shot on arrival, and the remaining three had been tortured and shot the next day. The bodies were interred at Tabalia on 24 October 2003.

The names of the dead brothers were:

- Nathaniel Sado
- Robin Lindsay
- Francis Tofi
- Alfred Hilly
- Ini Ini Partabatu
- Patteson Gatu
- Tony Sirihi

On 20 February 2004, Prime Minister of Fiji Laisenia Qarase presented the Brotherhood with the first prize in the regional category of the 4th Pacific Human Rights Awards "for its sacrifice above the call of duty to protect the vulnerable and build peace and security in Solomon Islands during the civil conflict and post-conflict reconstruction".

On 3 August 2008, the seven martyred members of the Anglican Melanesian Brotherhood were honoured during the concluding Mass of the Lambeth Conference at Canterbury Cathedral. Their names were added to the book of contemporary martyrs and placed, along with an icon, on the altar of the Chapel of Saints of Our Times. When the Eucharist was over, bishops and others prayed in front of the small altar in the chapel. Their icon stands at the Cathedral, representing their peace-making efforts and the multi-ethnic demographic of global Anglicanism.

The Seven Martyrs of the Melanesian Brotherhood are remembered in the Church of England with a commemoration on 24 April.

== Other activities ==
Anthropologists Annelin Eriksen and Knut Rio suggest that the Melanesian Brotherhood is "dedicated to sorting out spiritual, demonic, and sorcery-related problems." They note that the brothers "wear black robes as uniforms" and "have a powerful walking stick that is highly respected and widely reputed to perform miracles."

== See also ==
- Community of the Sisters of Melanesia
