= All Saints' Church, Dunedin =

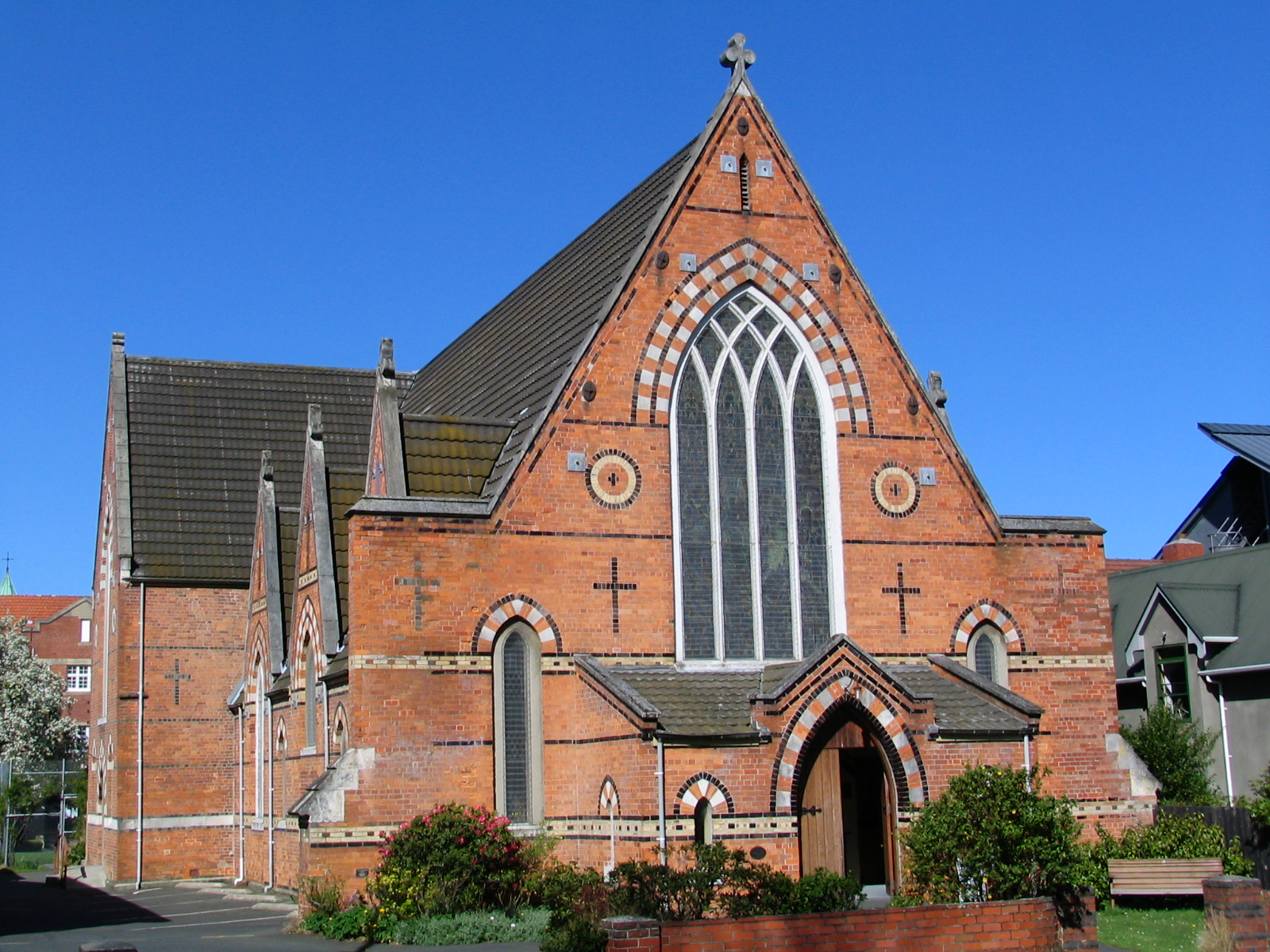
- All Saints' Church
- All Saints' Church, Dunedin
- 45.8623°S 170.5141°E
- Address: 786 Cumberland Street, Dunedin
- Country: New Zealand
- Denomination: Anglican
- Churchmanship: Anglo-Catholic
- Website: allsaintsdn.org.nz

History
- Status: Church
- Founded: 11 February 1865
- Founder: Bishop Henry Harper
- Dedication: All Saints
- Dedicated: 23 July 1865
- Consecrated: 21 April 1869

Architecture
- Functional status: Active
- Architects: William Henry Clayton; William Mason
- Architectural type: Church
- Style: Neo-Gothic

Administration
- Diocese: Dunedin
- Parish: Dunedin North

Clergy
- Vicar: The Ven Dr Michael Wallace

Heritage New Zealand – Category 1
- Designated: 27-July–1988
- Reference no.: 2136

All Saints' Church is a heritage-listed Anglican church located in Dunedin, New Zealand. Established in 1865, the church is part of the Dunedin North parish in the Diocese of Dunedin.

The church building has a Category I listing with the New Zealand Historic Places Trust.

== Parish ==
The parish lies within the takiwā/territory of Kāti Huirapa ki Puketeraki of Karitane, of the Kai Tahu tribe. The parish is made up of the former parish of All Saints and the former parish of St. Martin's North East Valley. The parish area includes North East Valley, Pine Hill, North Dunedin, Ravensbourne and Leith Valley.

== Church building ==
The building is the oldest church still used as a place of worship in Dunedin. All Saints' Church is the chapel of Selwyn College, Otago. The college was built around the church and the college and parish have a close relationship. Selwyn College was built as an Anglican theological college in 1893, from the beginning it also housed non-theological students from the university. All Saints' is located close to the University of Otago.

=== Architecture ===
The nave of the church was designed by William H. Clayton and built by James Gore in 1865; the transepts and chancel, designed by William Mason were added in 1873. All Saints' is an example of gothic revival architecture.

A notable architectural feature is the polychrome brickwork. The bricks came from the brickworks in Filleul Street, Dunedin. Also used in the building is Oamaru stone, an early use of the stone in Dunedin. In 1969, All Saints' Church was restored, in which the foundations, hardwood floor, and slate roof were replaced. At this time a nave altar was installed with altar rails designed by Ted McCoy.

=== Art ===
Notable art works in the church include a large rood hanging above the sanctuary carved by leading sculptor Frederick George Gurnsey (1868–1953) who also carved the aumbry door and the pulpit. A small Christus Rex by the eminent New Zealand sculptor Ria Bancroft is above the pulpit. In 2017 a set of ceramic sculptures of the Scriptural Way of the Cross by Whanganui sculptor Kirk Nicholls was installed.

In 2019 an appeal was launched to install a stained glass window in memory of the Ross Sea Party and in honour of Rev. Arnold Spencer-Smith. The window was blessed by Bishop Steven Benford on March 9th 2024.

In 2023 a sculpture of the Blessed Virgin Mary holding the child Jesus was unveiled and blessed by Richard Wallace Bishop of Te Wai Pounamu. The sculpture was made by master carver Rongomai-Tawhiti Parata-Taiapa. The carving's name is Hākui Meri Tapu o Ōwheo. Hākui is an acknowledgment of respect and form of address to a female elder. Meri Tapu refers to Holy Mary, o Ōwheo is the name of the Water of Leith and also the name of the pre-European kaika - settlement closest to All Saints, where Howe Street meets Leith Street.<https://hail.to/diocese-of-dunedin/article/9oZiPhq>

== History ==
All Saints' parish was organised before the Diocese of Dunedin was formed in 1869; for the first few years of the parish it was part of the Diocese of Christchurch. The land was given by James Allen Senior, father of Sir James Allen and the foundation stone laid on 11 February 1865 by Henry Harper 1st Bishop of Christchurch. The church was built rapidly (admittedly only the nave and narthex) and opened on 23 July 1865. The church was consecrated on 21 April 1869. At the 1886 Annual General Meeting the parish discussed an offer from the Bishop Samuel Tarratt Nevill 'to take over the Parish Church for the purpose of making it the Cathedral of the Diocese, and to facilitate the legal transfer by contributing £2,000 towards liquidating the debt on the property, at that time £2,600.' The AGM agreed to the bishop's offer however the project failed, 'the General Synod hesitating on legal grounds to sanction the transfer of the property.'

== Vicars ==
1. Rev. E.H. Granger 1865–1872
2. Rev. R.L. Stanford 1872–1879
3. Very Rev Alfred R. Fitchett Alfred Fitchett 1879–1928 (Dean of Dunedin 1894–1929)
4. Fr. William Hardy-Johnson 1928–1935 (Rector of Rosslyn Chapel 1923–1928)
5. Ven. L.G. Whitehead 1935–1948 Algy Whitehead also Warden of Selwyn College
6. Fr. Charles Harrison 1948–1964
7. Rev. Canon Arthur Philip Atkinson Gaze 1964–1980 (Cousin of Arnold Spencer-Smith)
8. Rev. Dr. John Irwin 1980–1983
9. Fr. David Best 1983–1997
10. Rev. Canon Erice Fairbrother 1999–2002
11. Fr. Tim Hurd 2002–2009
12. Ven. Dr. Michael Wallace 2010–

== Notable parishioners ==
- Sir James Allen, a politician who served as a churchwarden
- George Bell (1809-1899), a newspaper editor and proprietor who served as a churchwarden
- George Eliot Elliott, Clerk at signing of Te Tiriti o Waitangi/Treaty of Waitangi and who saved it from fire in 1841
- Thomas Sherlock Graham
- Frances and William Matthew Hodgkins, artists
- Choie Sew Hoy and Eliza Prescott who lived in a house known as Canton Villa at 798 Cumberland St. The site to the north of the vicarage is now owned by the parish.
- William Larnach of Larnach Castle
- Alois Duffus Lubecki (died 1926), a founder of the church, was a Polish Prince, son of Prince Alois Konstanty Drucki-Lubecki (1814-1864). Lubecki was a member of Diocesan Synod, Diocesan Standing Committee and the Diocesan Trust Board. He endowed scholarships at the University of Otago and the University of Auckland.
- Dr. Richardson, after whom the Richardson building at the University Of Otago is named
- Charles Henry Ritchie, curate at All Saints 1920-1922, part of the family of the influential John McFarlane Ritchie
- Shelley Griffiths, a legal academic at the University of Otago, is chair of the trust board supporting All Saints

== Worship ==
Worship at All Saints' is in the Anglo-Catholic tradition. Incense and bells are used for High Mass.

== Music ==
The first musician appointed to All Saints was George R West. George Richard West (1839-1891) was an organist, conductor, composer, publisher and founder of New Zealand’s first retail music shop. The first organ at All Saints was donated by the first vicar in 1871: "(Mr Granger) has to act as organist- or rather harmonium player- and later he presented the Church with an organ." Mr. Granger left All Saints in 1872. This organ went to Holy Trinity Church, Lawrence, New Zealand in 1874. The second All Saints' organ (1874-1905), has a label on the back: 'John B. West, Organ Builder, Dunedin, New Zealand’, however, it appears that this label has been pasted over the position occupied by a former label and it may be a Halmshaw & Sons organ. This organ was re-located to the original wooden 1863 St Peter's Church in Queenstown, New Zealand in 1906. The third and current organ was built by Bevington & Sons, a London firm founded in 1794. Two of the most notable Bevington organs are in St Patrick's Cathedral, Dublin and St Martin-in-the-Fields, London. Bevington organs won medals at exhibitions in Paris (1855 and 1867) and London (1862), and are held in high regard for the quality of their construction and voicing. The firm was absorbed into Hill, Norman and Beard in 1944. All Saints' Bevington organ was built in 1877 for St Paul's Presbyterian Church, Christchurch. In 1905 the organ was transferred to All Saints. It was restored in 1969 by the South Island Organ Company. The two manuals have tracker action, and the pedals have tubular pneumatic action. In recent years a Bourdon pedal stop has been added. All Saints' organ is one of three Bevington organs in Aotearoa New Zealand, the others being at the Cathedral of the Blessed Sacrament Christchurch and at St. John the Baptist Waimate North.

== All Saints' Hall ==
All Saints' Hall was built as the Cumberland St Wesleyan Methodist Chapel. It is constructed from timber from the Bell Hill Methodist Church (1862-8) designed by George Greenfield. During a gale in 1862 the Bell Hill church was badly twisted and deemed unsafe until the addition of a transept designed by William Mason permitted its reuse in February 1863. Its poor design and inconvenient position prompted its early demolition. From the sale of the Bell Hill property in 1868 £150 was set aside for the building of a new church. A weatherboard schoolhouse able to accommodate 150 worshippers was built on a quarter acre of freehold next to All Saints given by James Allen. The hall was erected in 1869, but the Wesleyan Methodist congregation didn't last very long - until about 1872.

The front portion of the hall has windows designed by prominent Dunedin architect Basil Hooper and installed in 1911. The University of Otago creche was established in the hall in 1968. Araiteuru Maori club (with Muru Walters as leader) used the hall before Araiteuru Marae was built.

For several years in the 1990s, before Al-Huda Mosque, Dunedin was established, the Muslim community worshipped in All Saints' Hall.

The belfry on the hall was removed in 1959 and restored in 2024. The original bell has been lost. The current bells come from the former church of St. Stephen in Hampden, Otago, the former church of St. Chad in Middlemarch, and the former Church of the Holy Cross, St. Kilda. The bells from St. Chad's and Holy Cross are bronze and were made at the A & T Burt foundry, Cumberland St, Dunedin. The cast steel bell from St. Stephen's was made by Naylor, Vickers & Co. Sheffield, England in 1860.
