= Holy Trinity Church, Port Chalmers =

Holy Trinity Church
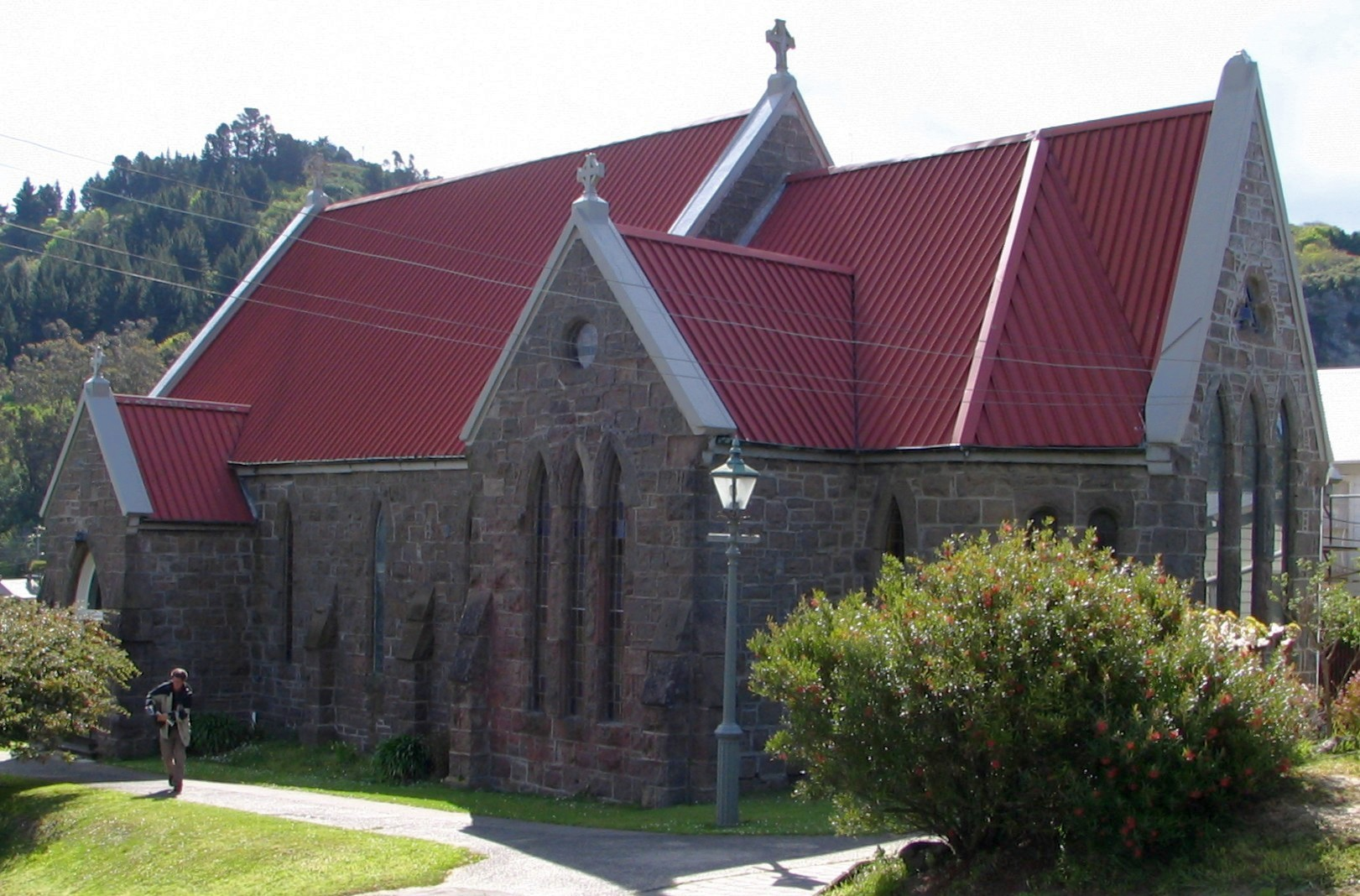
- Holy Trinity Church in 2008
- Holy Trinity Church
- 45°48′59″S 170°37′22″E
- Address: Corner of Scotia and Grey Streets, Port Chalmers, Otago
- Country: New Zealand
- Denomination: Anglican
- Website: holytrinity-pc.blogspot.com

History
- Status: Church
- Founded: 7 June 1871
- Founder: Bishop Samuel Nevill
- Dedicated: 28 April 1874
- Consecrated: 6 October 1907

Architecture
- Functional status: Active
- Architect: Robert Lawson
- Architectural type: Church
- Style: Academic Gothic Revival
- Years built: 1871-1874

Specifications
- Capacity: 300 people
- Materials: Volcanic stone

Administration
- Province: Anglican Church in Aotearoa, New Zealand and Polynesia
- Diocese: Dunedin
- Parish: Port Chalmers-Warrington

Heritage New Zealand – Category 1
- Designated: 2 July 1982

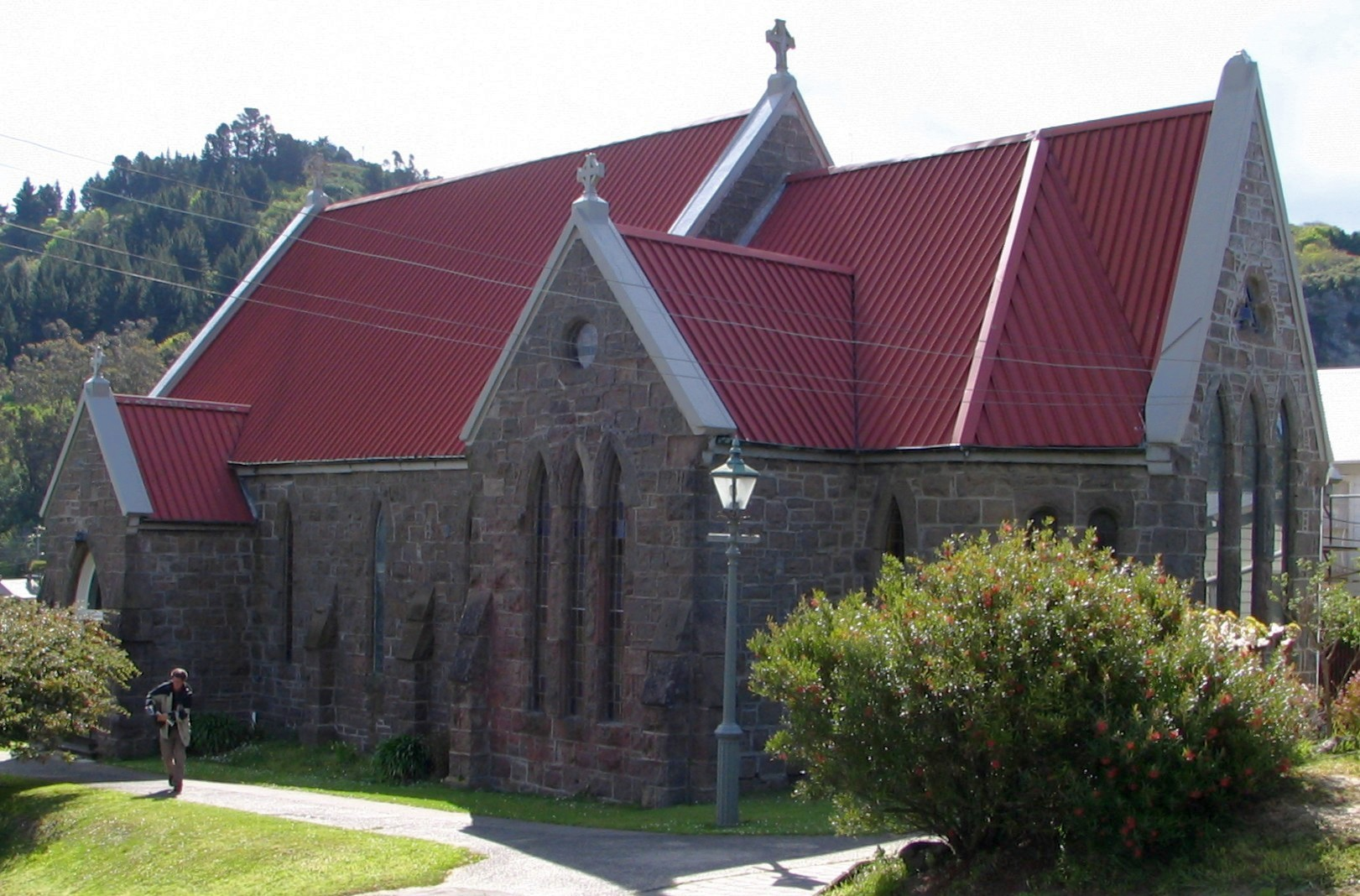
Holy Trinity Church in 2008

Holy Trinity Church is an heritage-listed Anglican church located in Port Chalmers, Otago, New Zealand. Completed in 1874, the Academic Gothic Revival church building is constructed in volcanic stone and has some fine stained glass, and is listed as a Category I Historic Place by Heritage New Zealand. Together with St Barnabas Church, Warrington, Holy Trinity Church is part of the Port Chalmers-Warrington Parish of the Diocese of Dunedin.

== History ==
=== Background ===
In its early years Port Chalmers was predominantly a Scots Presbyterian settlement, which required Anglicans to share places of worship with the Presbyterians. The first Anglican vicar resident in Otago was the Reverend J. A. Fenton, who arrived from England in 1852. With such a widespread geographical area to cover he was limited to holding services at Port Chalmers every six months.

By 1870 Congregationalists, Methodists (in 1855) and Presbyterians in Port Chalmers had each built their own churches. By now the Anglicans were holding their services in the Masonic Hall at 29 Wickliffe Terrace and decided that it was time to establish their own place of worship. In August 1870 R. H. Guise, on behalf of the Anglican community, advertised in the Otago Daily Times for a suitable site.

The project was given further encouragement in 1871 when Samuel Nevill was consecrated as Anglican Bishop of Dunedin which in turn encouraged the development of new parishes and new churches with which to service them. The Port Chalmers Anglican congregation formed a building committee, and the women organised fund raising, which lead to the committee being able to purchase for NZ£150, a suitable commanding 0.5-acre (2,000 m^{2}) section on the corner of Grey and Scotia streets. After seeking plans and specifications from a number of different architects for a church large enough to seat 300 worshippers, the committee selected the design of Robert Lawson.

=== Construction ===
Bishop Nevill laid the foundation stone on 7 June 1871, with full Masonic ceremony. The Bishop spoke at the event in front of 400-to-500 people, and again in the evening at the Masonic Hall. The laying of the foundation stone was the Bishop's first official action in Dunedin. Soon after, the parish's first vicar, Reverend T. L. Stanley was ordained.

"From an early hour bunting was displayed from private houses and others in honour of the occasion. The school children belonging to the Church, with their teachers, assembled at the Masonic Hall, the present place of worship... as also did the Ancient Order of Foresters... and members of the M.U.I.O.O.F. Lodge... the children, with flags and banners waving, taking precedence."

Construction was a drawn-out affair, and it wasn't until in 1873 when a Mr Borlase was contracted to complete the church that sufficient progress was made which allowed the church to be completed. The church was opened on 28 April 1874 at which the Bishop of Dunedin spoke to a congregation of 300, and congratulated Port Chalmers on its fifth place of worship, but stating, for the record, that of those other four places of worship: "unity would best be accomplished by the return of the Church's erring children to herself". The first vicar of the church was the Rev. W. Leeson, who had been leading the congregation prior to the church being completed. After three years of service he left in April 1876 for England after a valedictory service on 9 April 1876, in which he noted the difficulty he and his parishioners had faced in building the church:

"To their zealous co-operation was to be attributed the overcoming of the many difficulties that had beset the erection of the new church, which when he came amongst them was a mere heap of stones, the foundation only laid. Then they worshipped with no slight disadvantages at the Masonic Hall, but by dint of untiring perseverance in the good work they had put forth their hands to, had succeeded in raising for themselves a structure in honour of their Maker."

Evidently the association between the Masonic Lodge and Holy Trinity Church was on-going; the Otago Daily Times reporting a Masonic wedding taking place at the church in January 1878.

The Rev. Lorenzo Moore replaced Leeson and served until 1878, when he left after his offer to fund the building of a parsonage was rebuffed. The Rev. Moore was replaced by Rev. F. J. Sotham, from Oxford, England. The congregation proceeded to build a Sunday school hall and a bell tower, for which the bells were dedicated on 14 November 1879. This was the first belltower erected in the Dunedin Diocese. The larger of the two bells had been sent from England three years earlier by the same Rev. Leeson who left in 1876, but had not been raised due to "financial difficulties". The bell tower has since been demolished.

By 1879 the church's Sunday school had a roll of 116 students, with 50 girls and 40 boys in regular attendance.

Sotham left in 1880 to take up a role in Waikouaiti and was in turn replaced by Rev. Frederick Charles Platts. The Rev. Platts came to the church from Sandridge, Victoria, Australia and was at work in Port Chalmers by May 1880. His family of five arrived on the Arawata on 30 June 1880. One of the Rev. Platts' children was Daisy Platts-Mills, who would go on to become one of the first female doctors in New Zealand. On 1 December 1880, there was a fundraising event at the Foresters' Hall in Port Chalmers in order to raise money for a parsonage.

"The Hall presented a very pretty appearance, being tastefully decorated with flags, ferns and flowers; while nine tables were spread with an abundance of good things; supplied by the ladies of the congregation. Indeed, each one seemed to vie with the other in the supply and decoration of the tables, so that in addition to a feast of creature comforts, there was a floral feast."

The Bishop of Dunedin spoke at the evening and suggested that the main reason for the high turnover of ministers at the church was the lack of a parsonage. He urged the congregation to put aside any "petty feelings" and donate to this worthy cause. Fundraising for the parsonage was evidently successful, for by November 1881 the parsonage had been built on land adjoining the church at a cost of NZ£950.

"It is a solid, wooden two-storey structure of shapely proportions and exterior having a frontage of nearly 40 feet. The design is by Mr Allardyce, and the builders are Messrs Kermode and Murray. The house contains 12 rooms in all, and no pains have apparently been spared to have them equipped with all the adjuncts of domestic comfort."

The congregation's struggle to repay its debts incurred by its various construction projects eventually compelled them to sell the parsonage.

Rev. Platts remained the church's minister until shortly before his death on 28 May 1900, after 20 years of service.

Adding to the financial burden of its various building projects on the site, the roof of the church began to leak, causing ongoing maintenance expenses. This was eventually resolved in 1906, when the Reverend Tewsley provided funds to re-roof the church and restore the chancel, among other improvements. The re-roofing with Marseilles tiles was undertaken in 1909.

=== Consecration ===
Once the church was debt free, it was consecrated on 6 October 1907. In 1916, an organ was installed. In 1981 the Sunday school was demolished.

=== Recent developments ===
In 1987 the church was re-roofed with red coloured long run steel roofing. The church was granted Heritage New Zealand historic place category 1 status on 2 July 1982.
