= Percival James =

New Zealand clergyman, Dean of Dunedin 1950-56

Percival Ernest James (1 March 1883, in Easington, County Durham – 31 July 1958, in Dunedin) was a New Zealand clergyman who was Dean of Dunedin from 1950 until 1956.

Button was educated at St Bees School and The Queen's College, Oxford. He was ordained deacon in 1909 and priest in 1910. He was Chaplain of Durham School until 1917 when he became a Chaplain to the Forces, serving in Egypt and Mesopotamia. He was Vicar of St Mary's Cathedral, Auckland from 1920 to 1929; Vicar of St Paul's Cathedral, Wellington from 1929 to 1937; and Vicar of Halifax, Diocese of Wakefield, England from 1937 to 1939.

Church of England titles
Preceded by Alfred Button	Dean of Dunedin; 1950–1955	Succeeded by Walter Edmund Wilmshurst Hurst
