= St Paul's Cathedral, Dunedin =

Anglican church in Dunedin, New Zealand

St Paul's Cathedral
- The Cathedral Church of St Paul the Apostle
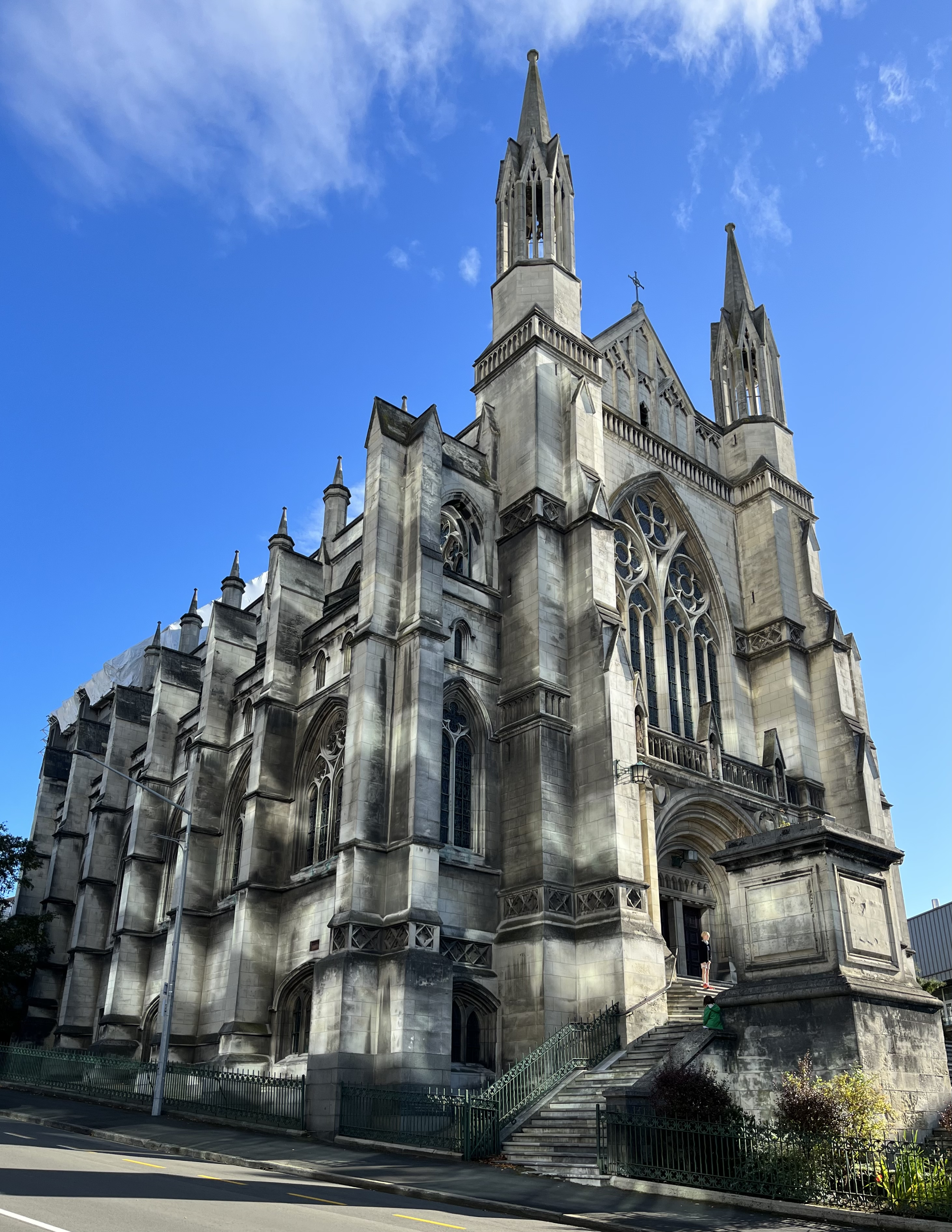
- St Paul's Cathedral, Dunedin
- St Paul's Cathedral
- Address: 228 Stuart Street, 36 The Octagon, near the Dunedin Town Hall, Dunedin
- Country: New Zealand
- Denomination: Anglican
- Churchmanship: Liberal Anglo-Catholic
- Website: stpauls.net.nz

History
- Status: Cathedral
- Founded: 8 June 1915
- Founder: Samuel Nevill
- Dedication: Paul the Apostle
- Consecrated: 12 February 1919; 25 July 1971 (chancel)

Architecture
- Functional status: Active
- Architects: Edmund Harold Sedding; Basil Hooper; Ted McCoy
- Architectural type: Church
- Years built: 1915 – 2003

Specifications
- Materials: Concrete, Oamaru limestone, Italian marble, Australian jarrah

Administration
- Diocese: Dunedin

Clergy
- Bishop: Anne van Gend
- Dean: Tony Curtis

Heritage New Zealand – Category 1
- Designated: 11 November 1987
- Reference no.: 376

St Paul's Cathedral is an Anglican cathedral church located in The Octagon near the Dunedin Town Hall in Dunedin, New Zealand. The cathedral is the seat of the Bishop of Dunedin and the mother church of the Anglican Diocese of Dunedin.

The cathedral building was listed on the Heritage New Zealand register of Historic Place Category 1 on 11 November 1987.

== History ==
The land for St Paul's Church was given by the sealer and whaler Johnny Jones of Waikouaiti.

The first parish church of St Paul was built on the site from 1862 to 1863. It was made of Caversham stone and could accommodate up to 500 people. It was not, however, well constructed. The stone weathered badly and the tall spire was removed after just a few years. The man consecrated to be the first Bishop of Dunedin, but never enthroned, Bishop Henry Jenner, visited the diocese in 1869. He officiated at St Paul's and gave a lecture on church music illustrated by the St Paul's choir. He is remembered as the composer of the hymn tune "Quam dilecta".

In 1871 Samuel Nevill was elected as Bishop of Dunedin. Initially he made no mention of the need for a cathedral for the diocese and it was not until the 1876 synod that he broached the subject. The issue was avoided by forming a commission to investigate the whole matter. The commission later recommended that St Paul's should become the mother church. However, Nevill favoured St Matthew's Church, and the impasse remained. In the early 1880s the question was revisited and again no resolution was reached. However, in 1894, 18 years after the issue was first raised, all sides agreed to the proposal for St Paul's to become the cathedral. The cathedral chapter was formed and took up the responsibility for running the cathedral from 1895. Thomas Whitelock Kempthorne of Kempthorne Prosser Ltd was a generous supporter of the cathedral and a memorial stands inside.

=== Building a new cathedral ===
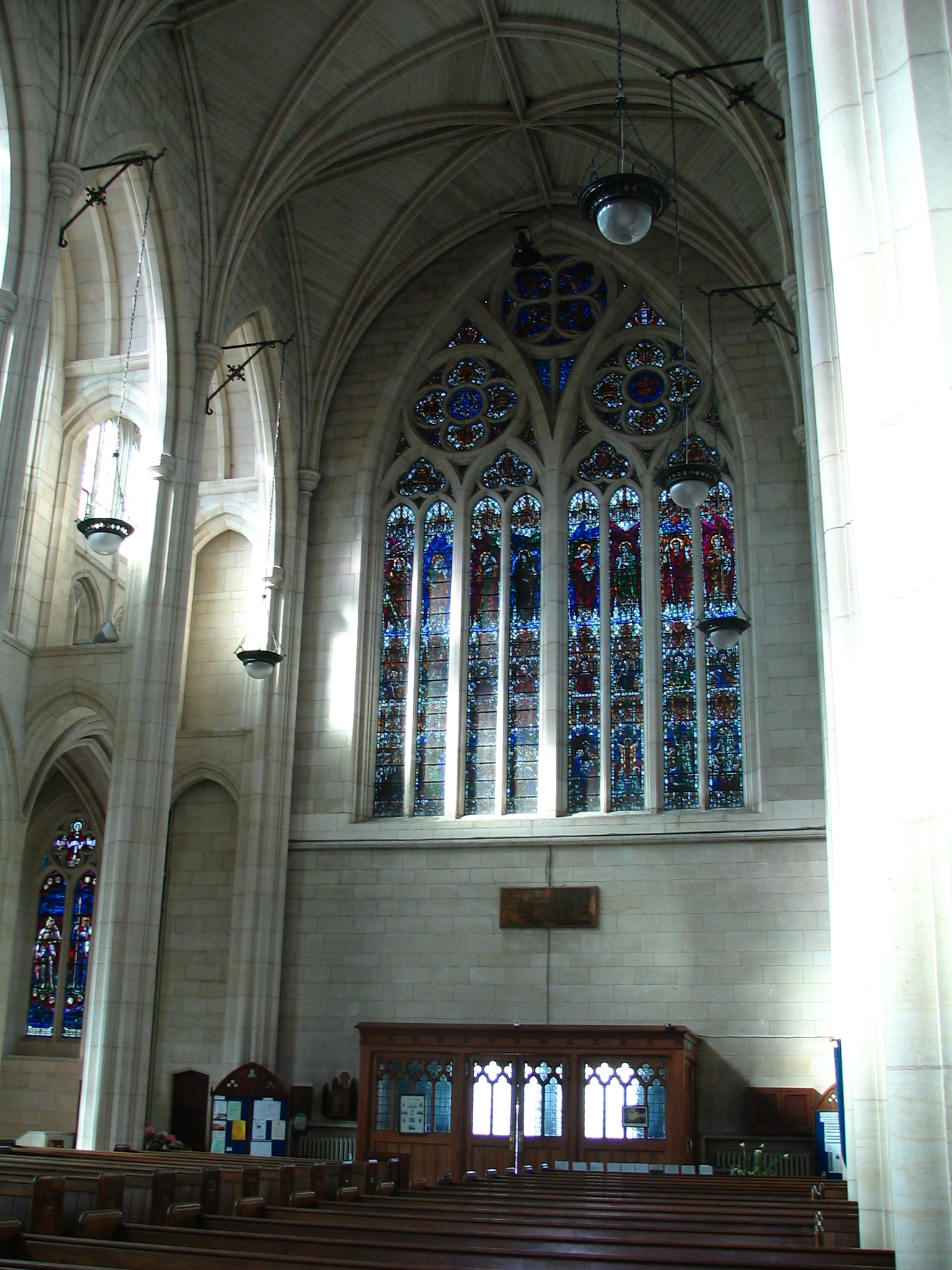
Interior view looking at the Memorial Window above the front entrance which reads "This Window was Erected To the Glory of God and in thankful and loving remembrance of those of Otago and Southland who gave their lives in The Great War 1914–1918"

In 1904, William Harrop, a prominent Dunedin businessman, died and left the bulk of his estate to fund a new cathedral. However, release of the money was conditional on the chapter raising £20,000 towards the cost of the building. Nevill threw himself into the effort, but it was not until 1913 that the £20,000 was raised and work could begin. The first in a series of plans and modifications were submitted by Sedding and Wheatly, an architectural company based in England. The author of the final design was Edmund Harold Sedding (1863–1921). The supervising architect in Dunedin was Basil Hooper (1876–1960).

On 8 June 1915, the foundation stone of the new cathedral was laid. Huge foundations, large piers and a tremendous vaulted ceiling, the only one in stone in New Zealand, rose from the ground, forming the new cathedral's nave. Lack of finances, however, precluded construction of anything more. There was no money for the crossing or the chancel as originally intended. In the end it was resolved that a temporary chancel should be constructed using material saved from the old St Paul's. The new cathedral was consecrated by Nevill on 12 February 1919.

=== 1930s ===
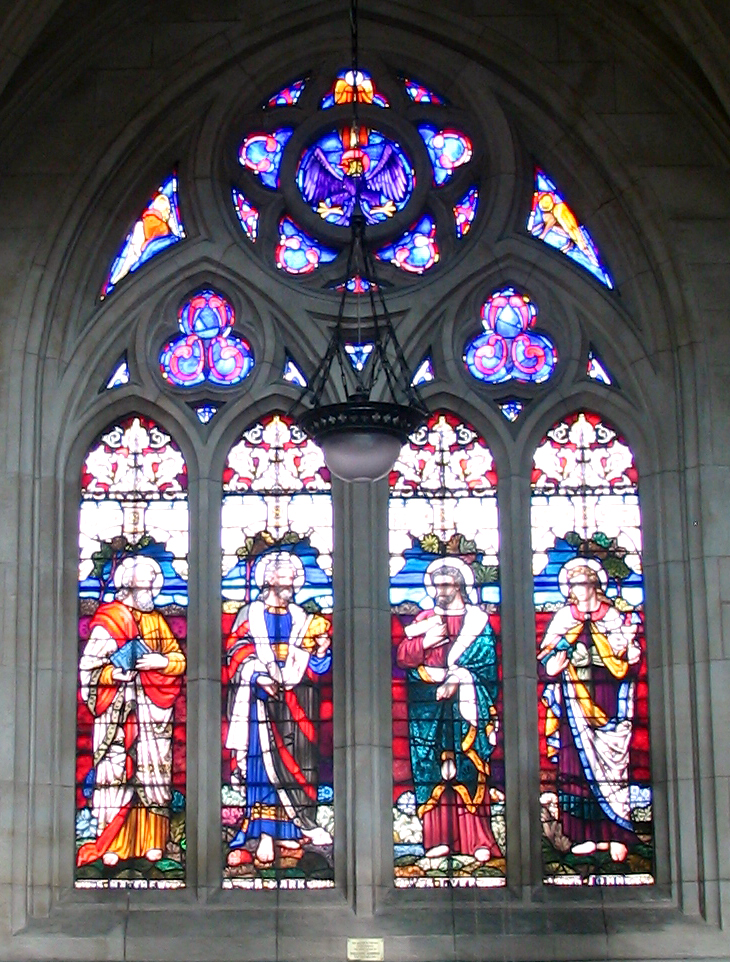
Stained glass window of the cathedral

Social work featured prominently at this time, with the synodsmen, vestry and church leaders all publicly opposed to the government's Depression policies. The Cathedral administered a food bank and distributed food parcels for the citizens of Dunedin. Shortly after the Second World War, St Paul's suffered the loss of Dean Cruickshank, who moved to the Diocese of Waiapu, and of Victor Galway. The latter, an organist and professor of music, had been very popular, attracting large crowds to his recitals and performances. He had also regularly broadcast his productions, paving the way for services to be aired on radio.

=== New chancel ===
In the 1950s the vestry made the important, though difficult, decision that it wouldn't complete the cathedral to its original design. The dean suggested that ways be examined to link an extension to the existing structure, and the vestry agreed to investigate the possibilities. In 1966, the decision was unfortunately made to build a new chancel. The plans had been drawn by Ted McCoy of the firm McCoy and Wixon. Construction began in earnest in December 1969. The old chancel was stripped and demolished and new columns began to rise from the debris. Construction and clearing up finished on Saturday 24 July 1971, and the Cathedral reopened the next day.

The new chancel was modernist, as high as the existing vault, with tall windows reaching from the floor almost to the ceiling. The altar was free standing and the furnishings matched the walls. Features of the new sanctuary were the free standing altar, (unusual for the time), clear glass windows, specially designed candle sticks, a Laudian altar front and a perspex cross containing stripes of the liturgical colours.

The sanctuary was re-ordered in 2003 with the altar moved forward into the nave.

=== Fire of 2020 ===
On 11 August 2020 a fire broke out in the roof of the new chancel causing substantial damage to the apse and the Raphael Hall beneath. Work on the restoration of the roof, along with the reinstatement of the sanctuary, and the installation of a new organ console, was completed in 2023, as the first part of a wider redevelopment plan to make the Cathedral more welcoming and accessible to worshippers and visitors.

== Clergy ==
=== Deans ===
- 1895–1929: Alfred Fitchett, Vicar of All Saints' Church, Dunedin
- 1932–1944: George Cruickshank (Bishop of Waiapu 1945–1946)
- 1945–1950: Alfred Button
- 1950–1955: Percival James (Dean Emeritus 1955)
- 1956–1963: Walter Hurst
- 1964–1965: Peter Sutton (Bishop of Nelson 1965–1990)
- 1965–1973: Tim Raphael (Archdeacon of Middlesex, England 1983−1996)
- 1973–1991: Robert Mills (Dean Emeritus 2019)
- 1991–1996: Warren Limbrick
- 1996–2001: Jonathan Kirkpatrick
- 2002–2008: David Rice (Bishop of Waiapu 2008–2014; Bishop at Episcopal Diocese of San Joaquin 2014 -)
- 2009–2018: Trevor James (Dean Emeritus 2019)
- 2020–present: Tony Curtis

=== Consecration of first woman as Diocesan bishop ===
In 1989, St Paul's received attention when Penny Jamieson was consecrated and enthroned as Bishop of Dunedin. Jamieson was only the second woman ordained as a bishop in the Anglican Communion and the communion's first woman to become a diocesan bishop. Her appointment followed the work of two cathedral women; Claire Brown, assistant priest at St Paul's from 1985 to 1989 and again during the early 2000s, and Barbara Nicholas, honorary priest assistant.

== Church tradition ==
=== Anglo-Catholicism ===
St Paul's sits within the Liberal Anglo-Catholic tradition, with the observance of festivals often including the use of incense, the practice of the seven sacraments of the Church, full and colorful celebrations of Holy Week, Easter and Christmas, a Requiem Mass for the Commemoration of the Faithful Departed at All Souls, and services of Benediction of the Blessed Sacrament.

=== Inclusive Church ===
St Paul's describes itself as an Inclusive Church, describing a belief "in Church which does not discriminate, on any level, on grounds of culture, economic power, gender, mental health, physical ability, race or sexuality." In 2020, the Dean was a signatory to the Global Interfaith Commission declaration on LGBTQ+ lives, and in 2022, the Cathedral hosted the Dunedin Pride Church Service.

== Music ==
=== Choir ===
St Paul's Cathedral has a notable history of church music, with a choir established for over 100 years. Historically, the choir has been consistently known for its high performance standards and wide repertoire. The choir has included many well-known musicians, including New Zealand composer Richard Madden. Many of the choir's members have pursued professional vocal careers, singing in English cathedral choirs including Ely, Salisbury and St George's Windsor. Several others – most recently Jonathan Lemalu and Anna Leese – have gone on to international careers in opera. The choir has also contributed many members to the New Zealand Secondary Students' Choir, the New Zealand Youth Choir and Voices NZ.

The primary focus of the cathedral choir is to enhance cathedral worship, alongside its wider role of outreach within the Diocese of Dunedin and beyond. The cathedral choir is an auditioned choir, which has historically sung at Sunday services, midweek Choral Evensong and festival occasions during the choir season (Candlemas to Christmas Day). The choir has also previously taken part in concerts and tours throughout the year, and has featured on broadcasts for Radio New Zealand alongside recordings for both national and local television.

=== Organ ===
St Paul's Cathedral's organ was built in 1919 by Henry Willis III in London and was installed the following year. In 1972, it was entirely dismantled and repositioned by the South Island Organ Company of Timaru. There are four manuals – great, swell, choir and solo. The organ has more than 3500 pipes and is often used for civic performances.
