= Isaac Richards =

Isaac Richards may refer to:

- Isaac Richards (bishop) (1859–1936), Anglican bishop in New Zealand
- Isaac Richards (soccer) (born 1999), Australian footballer
