= Kelvin Wright =

NZ Anglican bishop (b.1952)

Kelvin Peter Wright (born 1952) was the ninth Anglican bishop of the Diocese of Dunedin in Dunedin, New Zealand. Bishop Kelvin retired on Easter Monday 2017.

Wright was educated at St John's College, Auckland, the University of Canterbury, the University of Otago and the San Francisco Theological Seminary. He was ordained deacon in 1979, priest in 1980 and bishop on 27 February 2010. He served as curate at Merivale and as vicar of Waihao Downs, Hillcrest, Sumner Redcliffs and St John's Roslyn.

Anglican Communion titles
| Preceded by George Howard Douglas Connor | Bishop of Dunedin; 2010–2017 | Succeeded by Steven Benford |
