= Isaac Richards (bishop) =

Isaac Richards (11 February 1859 – 10 May 1936) was an Anglican bishop in New Zealand from 1920 to 1934.

== Life and church career ==
Richards was born in Tavistock, Devon, and educated at Wesleyan College, Taunton, and Exeter College, Oxford, where he matriculated in 1878, graduating B.A. in 1882, and M.A. in 1885. He was ordained in 1882. He became curate of St Paul's, Truro, in 1883, and married Gertrude Oxland in 1885. They migrated to New Zealand in 1886 when he became vicar of St Mark's, Remuera, in Auckland.

In 1895 he became Warden of Selwyn College in Dunedin, and in 1900, vicar of Tuapeka in Central Otago. He was canon of St Paul's Cathedral, Dunedin, and archdeacon successively of Queenstown and of Invercargill. He became Bishop of Dunedin in 1920, holding the position until he retired owing to ill-health in 1934.

Richards and his wife had a daughter and four sons, two of whom were killed at Gallipoli in 1915.

== Cricketing career ==
While he was a vicar in Auckland, Richards played five first-class cricket matches for Auckland between 1890 and 1894 as a batsman and occasional wicketkeeper. His most successful match was against the touring New South Wales team in early 1890, when, batting in the middle order, he made 25 (Auckland's top score in the first innings) and 29. He continued playing club cricket after he moved to Dunedin in 1895.

== Publications ==
Richards wrote several pamphlets on church matters and two books:

- The Church in Danger, or, The General Synod and the Constitution (1912)
- The Lord and Giver of Life: Addresses on the presence of the Holy Spirit in the world and in the church (1916)

== See also ==
- List of Auckland representative cricketers

Anglican Communion titles
Preceded by Samuel Tarratt Nevill	Bishop of Dunedin; 1920–1934	Succeeded by William Alfred Robertson Fitchett
