= Al-Huda Mosque =

Masjid Al-Huda or Al-Huda Mosque may relate to:

- Al-Huda Mosque, Dunedin, in New Zealand
- Masjid Al-Huda, Bukit Timah, Singapore
