= Keith Gover =

Keith Gover has been, since 2009, the Archdeacon of Southland, one of four Archdeaconries in the Anglican Diocese of Dunedin which serves a portion of New Zealand's South Island.
