= Algy Whitehead =

New Zealand Anglican cleric

Louis Grenville "Algy" Whitehead (12 February 1885 – 20 May 1961) was a New Zealand Anglican priest: he was Archdeacon of Central Otago from 1926 to 1934; and Archdeacon of Dunedin from 1934 to 1950.

Whitehead was born in Kaiapoi, Canterbury region in 1885, and was the son of a bookseller. As a result, from an early age he discovered a love of reading, and turned this to practical use by becoming a teacher, working in Christchurch and Ashburton.

Whitehead continued his education at the University of New Zealand, gaining an MA in philosophy in 1915, and was ordained in 1917. After a curacy at ChristChurch Cathedral, Christchurch he was Vicar of Ravensbourne from 1919 until 1919. He was also Warden of Selwyn College, Dunedin from 1919 until 1950. He had a reputation for his tolerance of student behaviour, believing that university students should be treated as adults and not as adolescents.

Whitehead visited Britain in the 1920s, studying at Oxford University during 1923 and 1924. On his return to Dunedin he continued his role as warden but augmented it by giving lectures and talks on both philosophy and religion. He became an assistant lecturer at the University of Otago in the Department of Theology during the 1940s, and had many more ecclesiastical duties as Vicar of All Saints' Church, Dunedin (1935–48), Vicar of Ravensbourne (1948–50), Archdeacon of Central Otago (1926–34) and of Dunedin (1934–50).

Whitehead retired to Riccarton in 1950, and died there in 1961. He was buried in Andersons Bay Cemetery, Dunedin.
