= Warren Limbrick =

Former Dean of Dunedin

Warren Edmund Limbrick was Dean of Dunedin from 1991 until 1996.

Limbrick was educated at the University of New Zealand and ordained in 1962. After curacies at Merivale and Papanui he was Vicar of Banks Peninsula from 1966 to 1969. He was Warden of Selwyn College, Otago from 1969 to 1980, and Director of Mission for the Anglican Diocese of Auckland from 1980 until his appointment as Dean.

== Notes ==
Church of England titles
Preceded by Robert Scott Mills	Dean of Dunedin; 1991–1996	Succeeded by Jonathan Kirkpatrick
