= Henry Jenner (bishop) =

Anglican bishop

Henry Lascelles Jenner (6 June 1820 – 18 September 1898) was a nineteenth century Anglican bishop.

== Education and ministry ==
Jenner was born in Chislehurst, West Kent educated at Harrow and Trinity Hall, Cambridge; and ordained deacon in 1843 and priest in 1844. After a curacy in Cornwall, he became Rector of Preston-next-Wingham, East Kent and died in post.

=== Dunedin controversy ===
In 1866, at the request of George Selwyn, the Primate of New Zealand, Charles Longley, the Archbishop of Canterbury, selected Jenner in anticipation of the creation of the See and Diocese of Dunedin from part of the Diocese of Christchurch. Jenner was consecrated in 1866 by royal licence as "Bishop of the United Church of England and Ireland in our colony of New Zealand", together with Andrew Suter (as second Bishop of Nelson) by Longley; Archibald Tait, Bishop of London (later Archbishop of Canterbury); and William Thomson, Bishop of Gloucester and Bristol on 24 August 1866 at Canterbury Cathedral. In 1867, Jenner embarked on a fundraising tour in England for his new diocese.

He was an enthusiastic Anglo-Catholic — when news of his "ritualist" activities reached Dunedin, anti-ritualist and anti-catholic sentiment was whipped up in the city and diocese. New Zealand's 4th General Synod (1868) asked him to give up his claim to the See. Henry arrived in New Zealand in early 1869, and the first session of the Dunedin diocesan synod rejected Jenner's claim to the see; he returned to England after four months, and very reluctantly resigned the see of Dunedin in 1871, the same year that S. T. Nevill was consecrated and enthroned Bishop of Dunedin. The proper procedures for the legal election of bishops to new dioceses in the independent colonial churches had not been established, so Jenner's possession of the See by right of his appointment (in England, by Longley) and consecration (in England, to a See not then erected) alone was dubious. Jenner maintained his legal right to the See right up until his resignation, encouraged by English and New Zealand bishops and synods. Despite several attempts to appoint him, he was never licensed as a bishop diocesan or assistant, in England or abroad; but he retained his East Kent living (undertaking occasional bishop's duties) until his death at Preston.

== Family ==
His son was a British scholar of the Celtic languages, a Cornish cultural activist, and the chief originator of the Cornish language revival.

Jenner, from a cricketing family, played first-class cricket in four matches 1839–1842, representing Marylebone Cricket Club, Cambridge University Cricket Club and the Gentlemen of Kent.

== See also ==
- List of Cambridge University Cricket Club players

Anglican Communion titles
New title	Bishop of Dunedin (disputed); 1866–1871	Succeeded by Samuel Nevill
