= St Barnabas Church, Warrington =

St Barnabas Church
- St Barnabas' Church
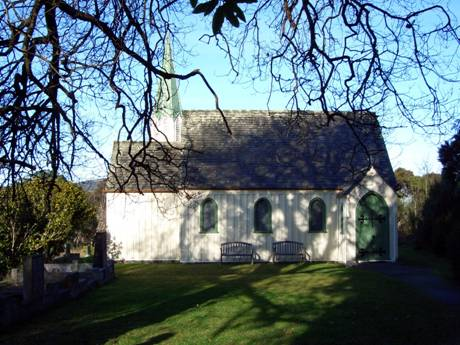
- St Barnabas' Church viewed from north
- St Barnabas Church
- 45°42′24″S 170°35′40″E
- Address: 266 Coast Road, Warrington, Otago
- Country: New Zealand
- Denomination: Anglican
- Website: stbarnabas.today

History
- Status: Church
- Dedication: Saint Barnabas
- Dedicated: 11 November 1872

Specifications
- Materials: Timber

Administration
- Diocese: Dunedin
- Archdeaconry: Coastal Otago

Heritage New Zealand – Category 2
- Official name: St Barnabas Anglican Church
- Designated: 9 September 2004
- Reference no.: 2354

St Barnabas' Church is a heritage listed Anglican church, located at 266 Coast Road, Warrington, Otago, New Zealand. The small wooden church was built in 1872.

== History ==
Anglicans met at the Pitt residence in Warrington until Mrs Pitt donated 2 acres (0.81 ha) of land for a church. The building was built by Benjamin Smith, opening on 11 November 1872.

The church building and its community are named after St Barnabas, one of the first prophets and teachers of the Christian Church at Antioch. In 2018, St Barnabas' Church was in the Archdeaconry of Coastal Otago, part of the Anglican Diocese of Dunedin.

== Building ==
The church is set in woodland and is surrounded by a cemetery. Otago's first Anglican Bishop, Samuel Tarratt Nevill was buried here in 1921. A traditional lych gate marks the entrance from Coast Road. The church is built in board and batten with a wooden shingle roof and a small copper-tipped tower, fitted with a bell inside. The stained glass windows are unusually elaborate for such a small building. They depict among others St. Joan of Arc and Christ the Redeemer. They have been said to have been ordered for a Roman Catholic church in Brisbane but diverted to Dunedin following a waterfront dispute. However recent research has found this to be mythical, and the real story of their original destination is even more complicated and interesting. The building is listed as a Category II Historic Place.

== Gallery ==
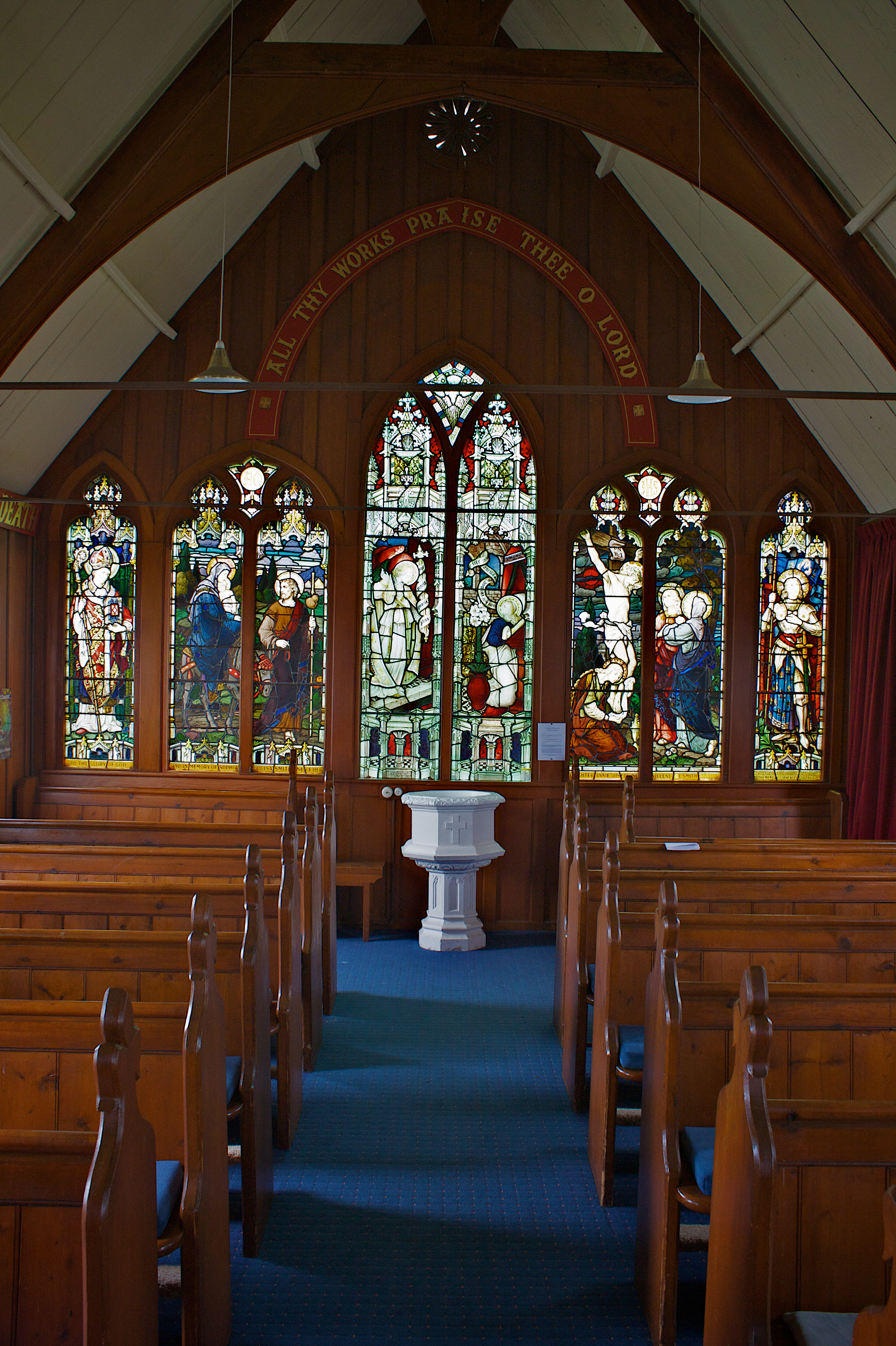
German stained-glass windows at the 'west' end of the church

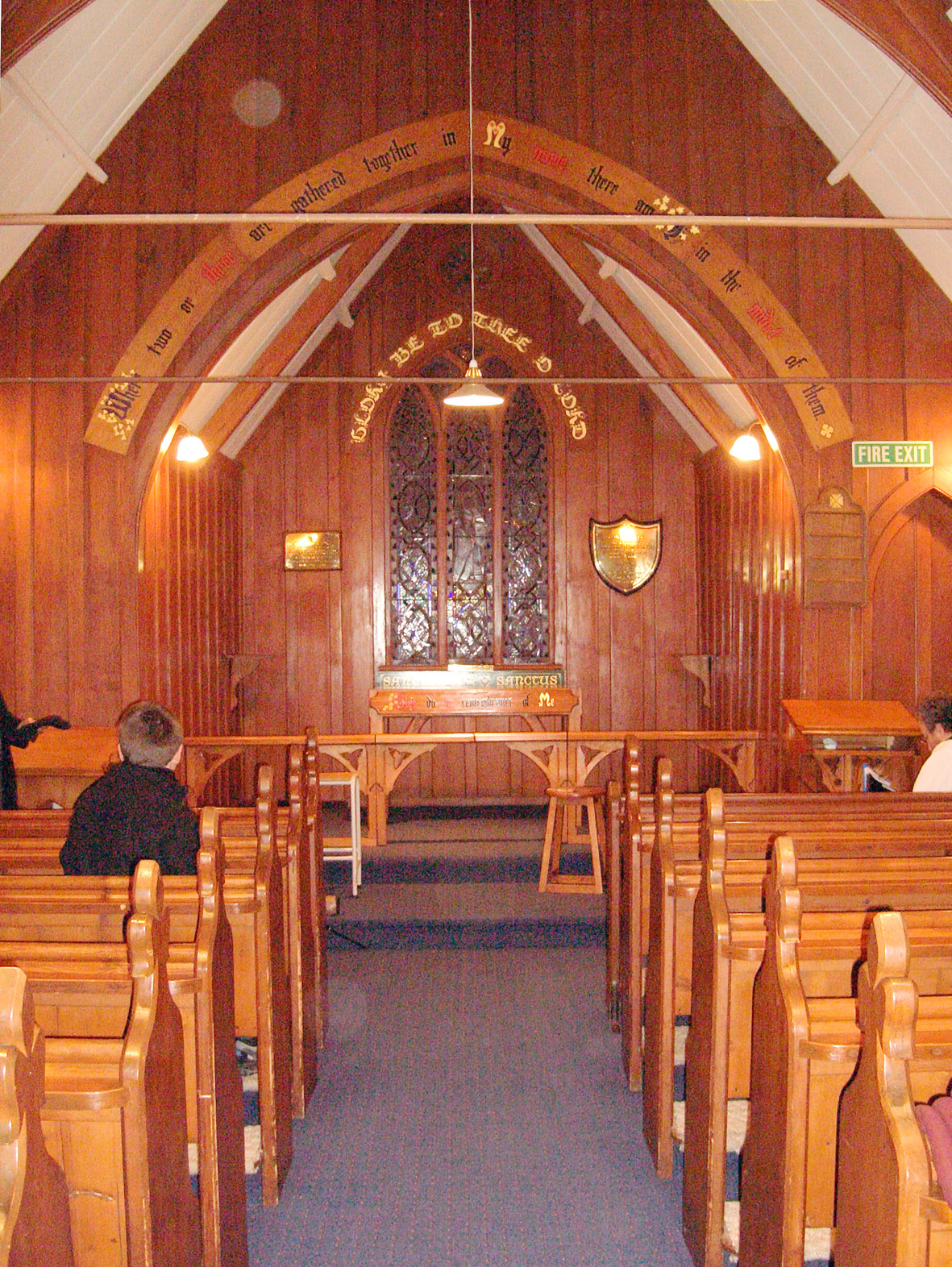
Wooden interior of St Barnabas Church
