= Walter Robinson (bishop) =

New Zealand bishop (1919–1975)

Walter Wade Robinson (10 December 1919 - 6 October 1975) was an Anglican priest in the second half of the 20th century.

Robinson was educated at the Cathedral Grammar School, Christchurch and Canterbury University before his ordination in 1943. He was curate of St Mary's Timaru and then of St Gabriels, Cricklewood. He then had incumbencies at Linwood and Viti Levu West. Later he was superintendent of the Indian Mission in Labasa and general secretary of the New Zealand Anglican Board of Missions.

Robinson had a career as a baritone singer.

In 1969 he was appointed Bishop of Dunedin; he died unexpectedly and in office.

Anglican Communion titles
Preceded by Allen Howard Johnston	Bishop of Dunedin; 1965–1975	Succeeded by Peter Woodley Mann
