= Trevor James (priest) =

New Zealand Anglican priest, Dean of Dunedin

Trevor James was the Dean of St Paul's Cathedral, Dunedin, New Zealand, from March 17, 2009 until June 3, 2018.

James was educated at King's College London. He has taught at universities in Australia, Hong Kong and New Zealand. He was Dean of Theology at the University of Auckland from 1993 until his appointment as Dean.

== Notes ==
Church of England titles
| Preceded by David Rice | Dean of Dunedin; 2009–present | Incumbent |
