= St Michael's Church School =

School in Christchurch, New Zealand

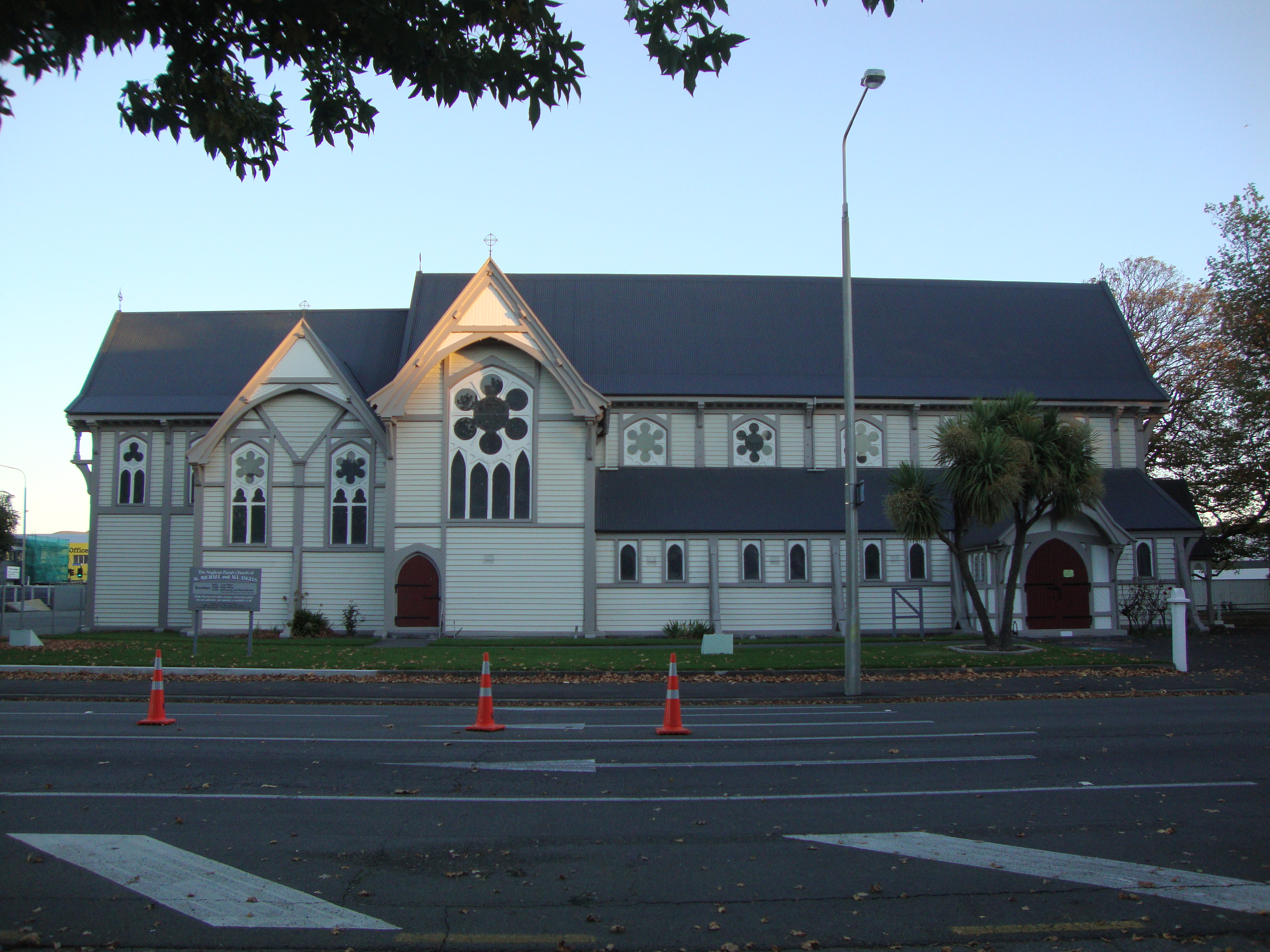
- St Michael and All Angels Church

Location
- 249 Durham Street, Christchurch; 43.53477°S 172.63322°E

Information
- Type: Private Co-educational Primary and Intermediate school
- Motto: in hoc signo vinces (Latin for "In this sign you shall conquer")
- Established: 1851; 175 years ago
- Ministry of Education Institution no.: 4136
- Principal: Liz Coster
- Enrolment: 126 (July 2026)
- Socio-economic decile: 9
- Website: Official website

St Michael's is a co-educational Anglican private primary and intermediate day school situated in the city centre of Christchurch, New Zealand. The school provides an education for year zero to year eight. It is associated with the Church of St Michael and All Angels.

Three of the buildings and structures are registered with the New Zealand Historic Places Trust as heritage items. The church building is registered as a Category I structure. The belfry of the church, built in 1861 and designed by Benjamin Mountfort, is also recognised as a Category I structure. The 1912 Stone School Building, designed by Cecil Wood, is registered as a Category II building.

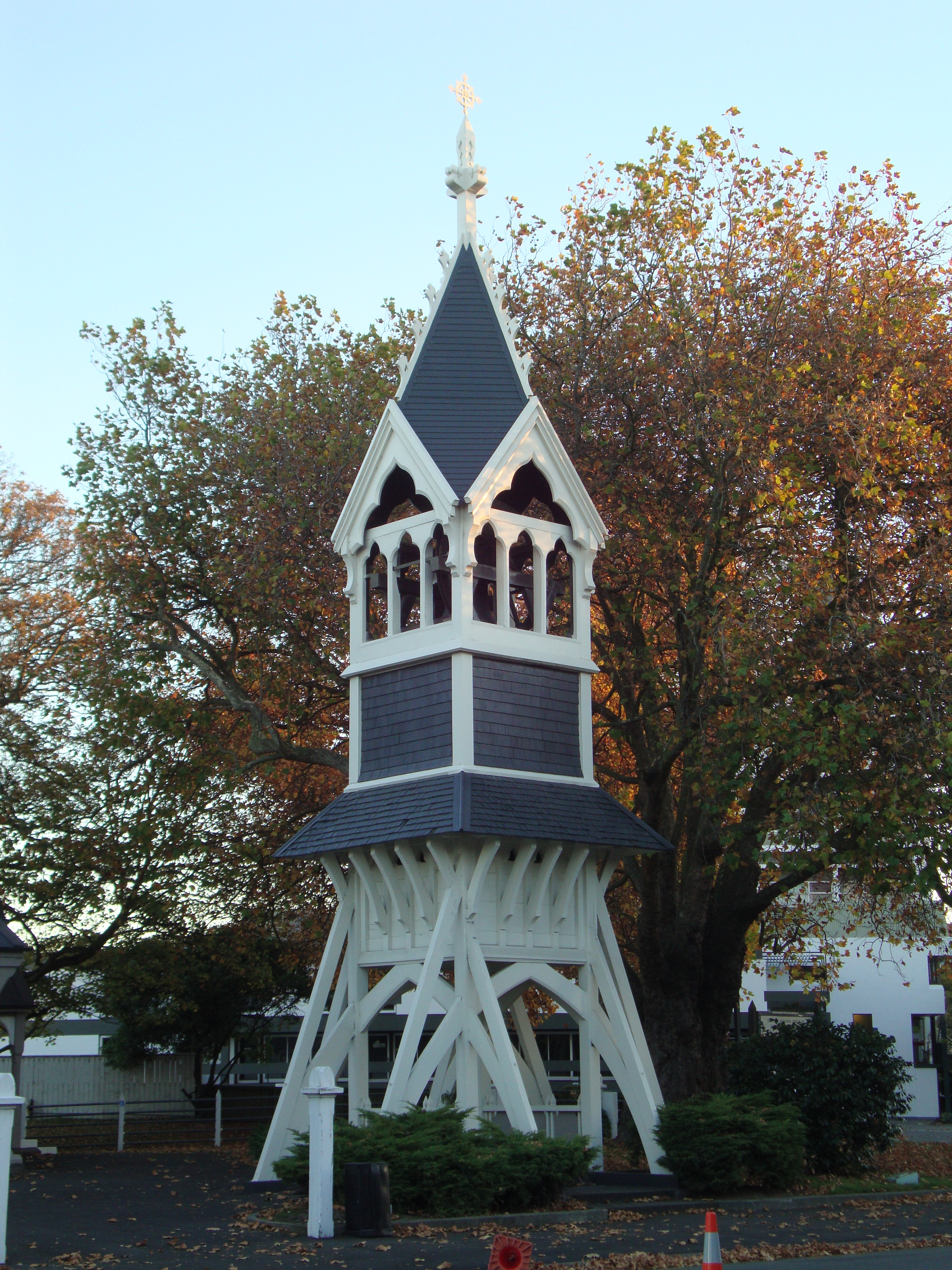
Belfry

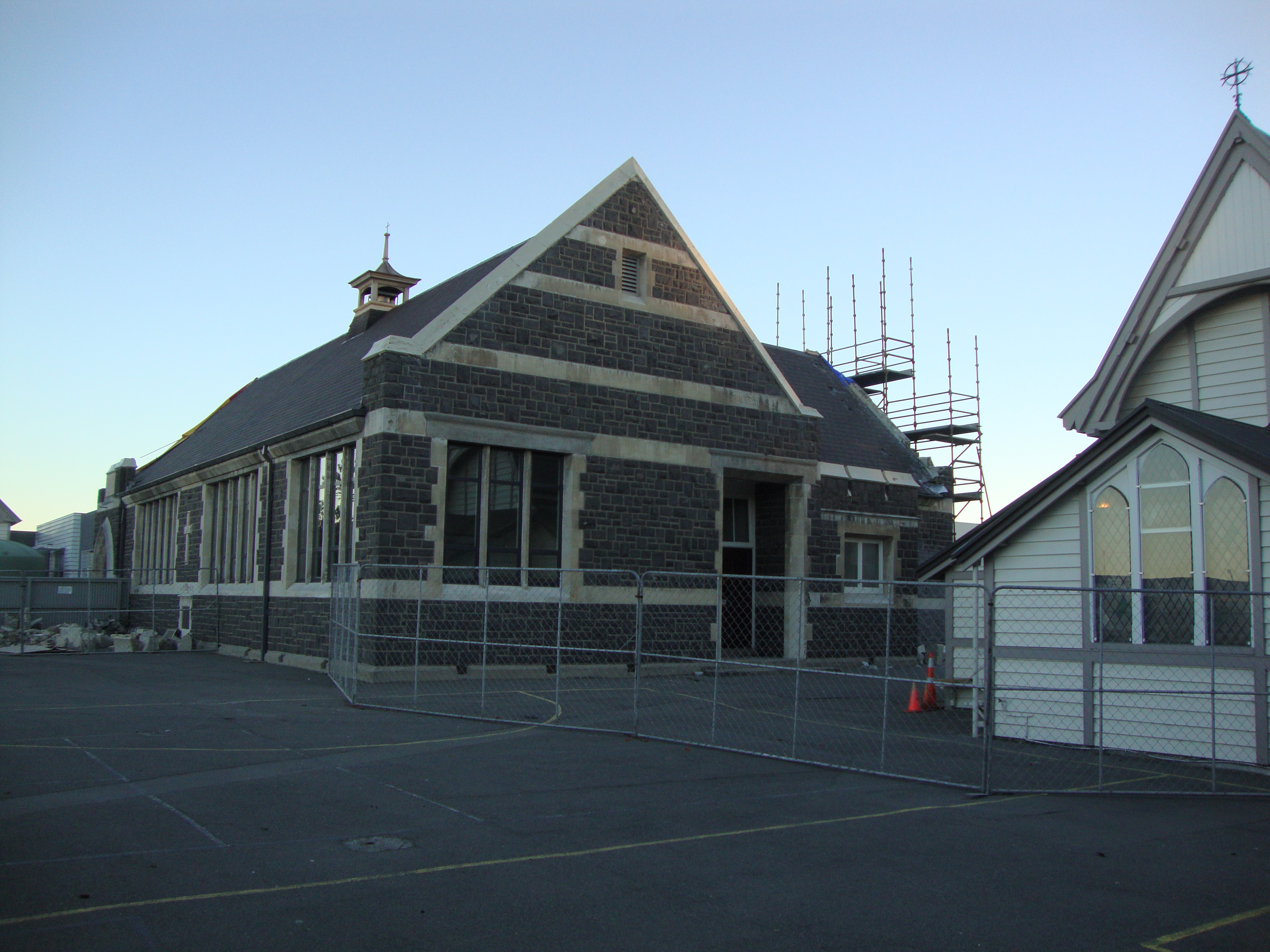
Stone School Building

== See also ==
- List of schools in the Canterbury Region
