= Peter Mann (bishop) =

Peter Woodley Mann CBE (25 July 1924 in Perth, Western Australia – 24 August 1999 in Dunedin) was the sixth Anglican Bishop of the Diocese of Dunedin in Dunedin, New Zealand.

Mann was educated at Prince Alfred College, Adelaide and St John's College, Auckland before being ordained in 1954. He held curacies at Waiapu and Rotorua before holding incumbencies at Pōrangahau and Dannevirke. Later he was Archdeacon of Blenheim, Marlborough and Timaru before his ordination to the episcopate). He was consecrated a bishop on St Matthias' Day (24 February) 1976.

In the 1994 Queen's Birthday Honours, Mann was appointed a Commander of the Order of the British Empire, for services to the Anglican Church.

Anglican Communion titles
Preceded by Walter Wade Robinson	Bishop of Dunedin; 1976–1990	Succeeded by Penny Jamieson
