= Ria Bancroft =

New Zealand sculptor

- Born: 1907; England
- Died: 8 March 1993 (aged 85–86); Christchurch, New Zealand
- Education: Academy of Florence
- Known for: Sculpture
- Notable work: Tabernacle Screen Doors, Cathedral of the Blessed Sacrament, Christchurch

Ria Bancroft (1907 – 8 March 1993) was a British-New Zealand artist born in England. She created the Tabernacle Screen Doors for Cathedral of the Blessed Sacrament in Christchurch and her works are held in several New Zealand art galleries.

== Background ==
Born in England in 1907, as an adult she moved to Canada to work as a television designer and display artist. She moved Italy in the 1960s to study art, receiving a Diploma from the Academy of Florence. She moved to New Zealand in 1962, joining her daughter Peb Simmons in Christchurch. Bancroft died on 8 March 1993 in Christchurch, New Zealand.

== Career ==
After studying art in Italy, it was only after moving to New Zealand that Bancroft began to focus on her sculpture work. Her work often included religious subjects.

Bancroft became a member of the Canterbury Society of Arts and exhibited with The Group in 1963, 1965, 1966, 1967, 1968, 1969, 1973, 1974, 1975, 1976, and 1977. In 1964 she was invited to join the New Zealand Society of Sculptors. During this time she also exhibited with the New Zealand Academy of Fine Arts

After receiving recognition for her work, Bancroft became increasingly involved in art education and delivered a number of talks and lectures. In 1971 she accepted a position as art teacher at Xavier College, a boys' High School. In 1974 she resigned the position to focus on her art.

In addition to her public works, notable works by Ban include Rocking Horse (1963) and Unicycle No 2. Her final piece, a life size portrait of the Russian writer Alexander Solzhenitsyn, was completed in 1992.

In 1998 the Robert McDougall Art Gallery held a posthumous exhibition of Bancroft's work entitled, Ria Bancroft: Three Decades of Sculpture. A biography of her life, No Ordinary Woman: A Biography of Ria Bancroft, was written by her daughter Peb Simmons and published in 1997.

Her work is held in the collection of the Suter Te Aratoi O Whakatū gallery and Christchurch Art Gallery Te Puna o Waiwhetu.

=== Public works ===
Bancroft received many public commissions in New Zealand including:

- Horizon – her first major commission, for the Christchurch City Council in 1965, it incorporated in the design of the new 'Horizon' restaurant at Christchurch International Airport
- Forms – 9-metre-long mural, made in collaboration with Pat Mulcahy, for the Ministry of Works and was incorporated in the design of the University of Canterbury's new Science Lecture Hall
- mural for the New Zealand Broadcasting Corporation building in Rotorua, created in 1966 in collaboration with Pat Mulcahy
- a maquette "Angel of St Matthew" – for Saint Matthew’s Catholic Church in 1967
- the Tabernacle Screen Doors for Christchurch’s Cathedral of the Blessed Sacrament in 1975, opened 12 June 1977
- Thy Kingdom Come – commissioned for the Holy Cross Chapel in Christchurch in the 1970s
- ‘Christus Rex’ memorial cross for All Saints' Church in Dunedin – completed in 1990

Her work, Energetic Forms, 1965–1966, created with Pat Mulcahy is included in the University of Canterbury sculpture trail.

In the 1980s she assisted in the refurbishment of St Mary’s Catholic church in New Brighton (where she attended) with sculptor Bing Dawe. In addition to work on the altar, lectern, font, and sanctuary, Bancroft created and gifted a sculpture of the Virgin Mary to the church.
