= Warrington, New Zealand =

Warrington Ōkāhau
- Town
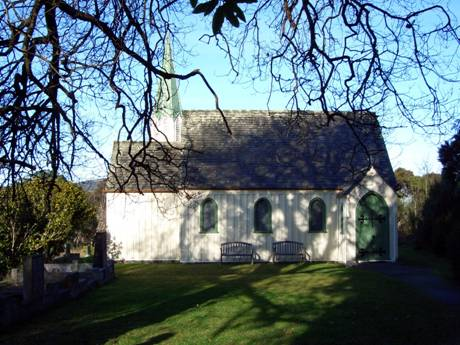
- St Barnabas Church
- Interactive map of Warrington
- Coordinates: 45.7101°S 170.5941°E
- Country: New Zealand
- Island: South Island
- Region: Otago
- District: Dunedin
- Community board: Waikouaiti Coast Community Board
- Electorates: Dunedin; Te Tai Tonga (Māori)

Government
  - Territorial authority: Dunedin City Council
  - Regional council: Otago Regional Council
  - Mayor of Dunedin: Sophie Barker
  - Dunedin MP: Rachel Brooking
  - Te Tai Tonga MP: Tākuta Ferris

Area
  - Total: 7.39 km^{2} (2.85 sq mi)

Population (June 2025)
  - Total: 560
  - Density: 76/km^{2} (200/sq mi)
- Time zone: UTC+12 (NZST)
  - Summer (DST): UTC+13 (NZDT)
- Area code: 03
- Local iwi: Ngāi Tahu

Warrington, known in Māori as Ōkāhau, is a small settlement on the coast of Otago, in the South Island of New Zealand. It is situated close to the northern shore of Blueskin Bay, an area of mudflats north of Dunedin, and is administered as part of Dunedin City. Warrington is 3 km (1.9 mi) from State Highway 1 linked by Coast Road. The Main South Line railway passes through the township and a tourist train, the Seasider passes through the settlement once or twice a week between Dunedin and Palmerston.

Warrington beach, a popular surf beach for locals and visitors from the city, is patrolled by volunteer lifeguards of the Warrington Surf Life Saving Club which established in Dunedin in 1957 and relocated here in 1976.

Warrington Beach is occasionally used by naturists for nude sunbathing. New Zealand has no official nude beaches, as public nudity is legal on any beach where it is "known to occur".

St Barnabas Church is one of the area's oldest buildings.

== Education ==
Warrington School is a year 0–8 (ages 5–13) full primary school, with a roll of 37 students as at July 2026. A school has existed at Warrington since at least 1879.

Warrington Playcentre is an early childhood centre (ages 0–6).

== Demographics ==
Warrington is described by Statistics New Zealand as a rural settlement. It covers 7.39 km^{2} (2.85 sq mi), and had an estimated population of 560 as of June 2025, with a population density of 76 people per km^{2}. It is part of the much larger Bucklands Crossing statistical area.

Historical population
Year	Pop.	±% p.a.
2006	429	—
2013	447	+0.59%
2018	489	+1.81%

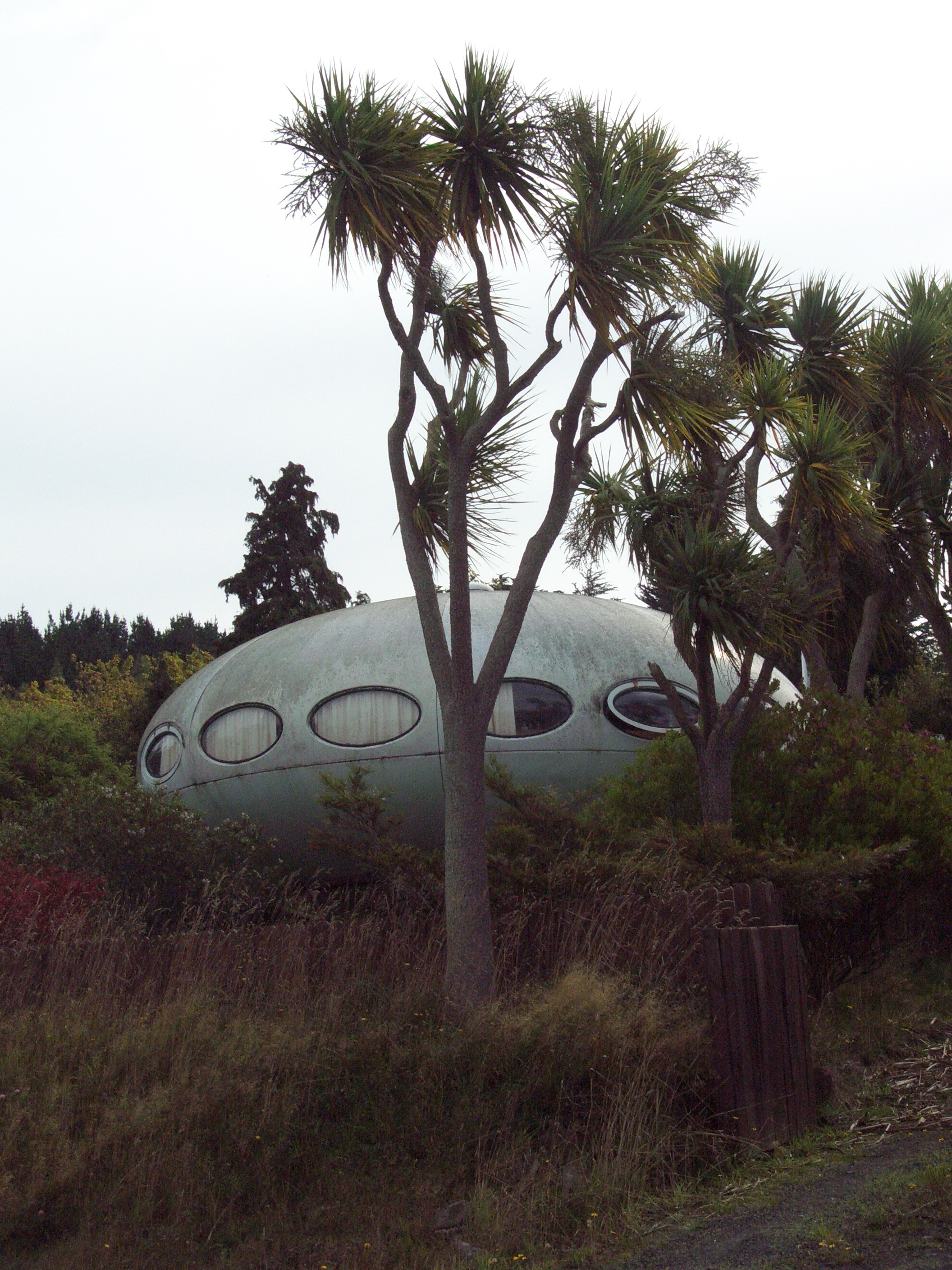
A Futuro house in Warrington

Warrington had a population of 489 at the 2018 New Zealand census, an increase of 42 people (9.4%) since the 2013 census, and an increase of 60 people (14.0%) since the 2006 census. There were 237 households, comprising 249 males and 240 females, giving a sex ratio of 1.04 males per female, with 93 people (19.0%) aged under 15 years, 54 (11.0%) aged 15 to 29, 249 (50.9%) aged 30 to 64, and 90 (18.4%) aged 65 or older.

Ethnicities were 94.5% European/Pākehā, 11.0% Māori, 2.5% Asian, and 1.2% other ethnicities. People may identify with more than one ethnicity.

Although some people chose not to answer the census's question about religious affiliation, 62.6% had no religion, 24.5% were Christian, 0.6% had Māori religious beliefs, 0.6% were Muslim and 3.1% had other religions.

Of those at least 15 years old, 153 (38.6%) people had a bachelor's or higher degree, and 48 (12.1%) people had no formal qualifications. 84 people (21.2%) earned over $70,000 compared to 17.2% nationally. The employment status of those at least 15 was that 183 (46.2%) people were employed full-time, 60 (15.2%) were part-time, and 9 (2.3%) were unemployed.
