= Shelley Griffiths =

New Zealand law professor

Academic background
- Education: University of Otago
- Thesis: Feminism and the ideology of motherhood in New Zealand, 1896-1930 (1985)
- Academic advisor: Erik Olssen

Academic work
- Institutions: University of Otago

Shelley Griffiths is a New Zealand law academic, and is a full professor at the University of Otago, specialising in taxation law, and the history of taxation.

== Academic career ==
Griffiths trained as a historian, completing a Master of Arts in history titled Feminism and the ideology of motherhood in New Zealand, 1896-1930 at the University of Otago in 1985. She worked in public practice at an international accountancy practice in Dunedin for thirteen years, and then joined the faculty of the University of Otago as a lecturer in 2001, rising to full professor in 2017. Griffiths was dean of the Otago University faculty of law from 2021-2025.

Griffiths was made a fellow of the Chartered Accountants Australia and New Zealand in 2023. The fellowship nomination called her "one of New Zealand's pre-eminent tax researchers".

Griffiths teaches on taxation, and researches and writes on tax policy, tax administration, the regulation of financial products, and litigations and disputes around tax. She has written about how the disclosure of information can "reduce asymmetry" between the providers of financial services and their investors, and researched the Financial Markets Conduct Act 2013. Her work on the New Zealand Bill of Rights Act and taxation law has been widely used in New Zealand and overseas.

Griffiths is chair of the All Saints Church charitable trust board. She is a trustee of the Dunedin Arts Festival Board. Griffiths was formerly Chair of the Academic Committee of the Banking and Financial Services Law Association.

== Selected works ==
- Griffiths, Shelley (25 August 2017). "New Zealand". Capital Gains Taxation. Edward Elgar Publishing. doi:10.4337/9781784716028.00017. ISBN 9781784716011.
- Prebble, J.; Griffiths, Shelley (December 2014). The Taxation of Property Transactions. LexisNexis NZ Limited. ISBN 978-1-927149-43-0.
- Griffiths, S., & Palmer, J. (2013). Sham, tax avoidance, and a GAAR: A New Zealand perspective. In E. Simpson & M. Stewart (Eds.), Sham transactions. (pp. 228–242). Oxford University Press.
- Griffiths, S. (2013). An "abusive tax position". New Zealand Law Journal, 11, 392-393, 396.
