= Robert Mills (priest) =

Dean of Dunedin from 1973 to 1991

Robert Scott Mills was Dean of Dunedin from 1973 until 1991.

Mills was educated at the University of New Zealand and ordained in 1960. After a curacy at Whangārei he was Chaplain to the Bishop of Nelson and was Dean of Dunedin from 1973 to 1991; Vicar of Blockhouse Bay from 1969 to 1973.

== Notes ==
Church of England titles
Preceded by Timothy John Raphael	Dean of Dunedin; 1973–1991	Succeeded by Warren Limbrick
