= Billy Fitchett =

New Zealand bishop (1872–1952)

William Alfred Robertson Fitchett (6 February 1872 – 15 August 1952) was an Anglican bishop in New Zealand. He was the Bishop of Dunedin from 1934 to 1952.

Fitchett was born in Christchurch and his father was the Very Reverend Alfred Robertson Fitchett CMG of Dunedin. He was educated at Otago Boys' High School and Selwyn College, Cambridge. Ordained in 1901, he was curate then priest in charge of St Thomas' Wellington before being vicar of Dunstan and Roslyn. In 1915 he became the Archdeacon of Dunedin, a post he held for 19 years before being appointed its bishop.

Fitchett was awarded the King George V Silver Jubilee Medal in 1935.

Anglican Communion titles
Preceded by Isaac Richards	Bishop of Dunedin; 1934–1952	Succeeded by Allen Howard Johnston
