= George Connor (bishop) =

Bishop of Dunedin

George Howard Douglas Connor (born 1942) was the eighth bishop of the Anglican Diocese of Dunedin in Dunedin, New Zealand.

Connor was educated at Christ's College, Christchurch and St John's College, Auckland. He was ordained deacon in 1965, priest in 1966. He was a Theological Tutor for the Church of Melanesia and then a Maori Mission priest for the Diocese of Waiapu. He was Archdeacon of Waiapu and then Regional Bishop in the Bay of Plenty. He was consecrated bishop 2 April 1989 and served the Bay of Plenty until 2005 when he was translated to Dunedin. He resigned his episcopal see on 30 November 2009.

He additionally served as Convening Bishop of Tikanga Pakeha (New Zealand dioceses), 1998–2006, and as such Co-Presiding Bishop of New Zealand, 2004–2006; in retirement, he has served as He Pīhopa Āwhina (an honorary assistant bishop) in Te Tai Tokerau since 2010. In 2012 he completed a master's degree in history at Massey University. He is married to Nonie Connor.

Anglican Communion titles
Preceded by Penny Jamieson	Bishop of Dunedin; 2005–2009	Succeeded by Kelvin Wright
