= Jonathan Kirkpatrick =

Anglican dean in New Zealand

- Born: February 1958 (age 68); England
- Other name: Jonathan Richard Kirkpatrick
- Education: University of London; University of Otago
- Relatives: Tim Barnett (former partner)
- Offices held: Vicar at St Michael and All Angels, Christchurch (1991–1996); Dean at St. Paul's Cathedral, Dunedin (1996–2001)

Jonathan Richard Kirkpatrick (born February 1958) was Dean of Dunedin from 1996 until 2001.

He obtained an honours degree in theology from the University of London. He came to New Zealand in 1991 with his partner, Tim Barnett, to be vicar at St Michael and All Angels, Christchurch. Kirkpatrick is known for his gay-rights activism within the Anglican church.

Kirkpatrick became Dean of St Paul's Cathedral in Dunedin in 1996. Barnett remained in Christchurch and was elected to parliament later that year as the Labour MP for Christchurch Central. Kirkpatrick obtained a Master of Business Administration degree in commerce at the University of Otago. In August 1998, Barnett and Kirkpatrick were in a car crash in which Kirkpatrick suffered an injury to his back and required surgery. Kirkpatrick dismissed the director of music at St Paul's which resulted in a complaint to the Broadcasting Standards Authority being upheld against TV3's reporting.

In 2001, Kirkpatrick moved to Auckland and headed Auckland University of Technology's Business Innovation Centre, where he stole NZ$660,000 from the university and in October 2011 was jailed for three years and two months. He was released on parole after his first appearance in front of the New Zealand Parole Board in October 2012 after serving a third of his jail term.

In March 2026, Kirkpatrick was found guilty of sexually violating an 18-year-old man in 1994 after plying him with cannabis and alcohol.

Church of England titles
Preceded by Warren Limbrick	Dean of Dunedin; 1996–2001	Succeeded by David Rice
