= Tim Raphael =

British Anglican priest

Timothy John Raphael (26 September 1929 – 20 November 2016) was an Anglican priest.

Raphael was born in Christchurch and educated at Christ's College, Christchurch and the University of Leeds, after which he was a Scientific Officer at RAE Bedford.

He trained for ordination at the College of the Resurrection, Mirfield and was ordained deacon in 1955 and priest in 1956. He was a curate at St Stephen, Westminster from 1955 to 1960. He was Vicar of St Mary's Church, Welling from 1960 to 1963; Vicar from 1963 to 1965 of St Michael and All Angels, Christchurch, New Zealand; Dean of Dunedin from 1965 to 1973; Vicar of St John's Wood, London from 1973 to 1983; and Archdeacon of Middlesex from 1983 to 1996.

Raphael married Anne Shepherd in England in 1957. They had three children. He retired in 1996 and moved to Cheltenham, where he died in November 2016, aged 87.

Church of England titles
Preceded by Peter Sutton	Dean of Dunedin; 1965–1973	Succeeded by Robert Mills
Preceded by John Perry	Archdeacon of Middlesex; 1983–1996	Succeeded by Malcolm Colmer
