= Church of St Michael and All Angels, Christchurch =

Church of St Michael and All Angels
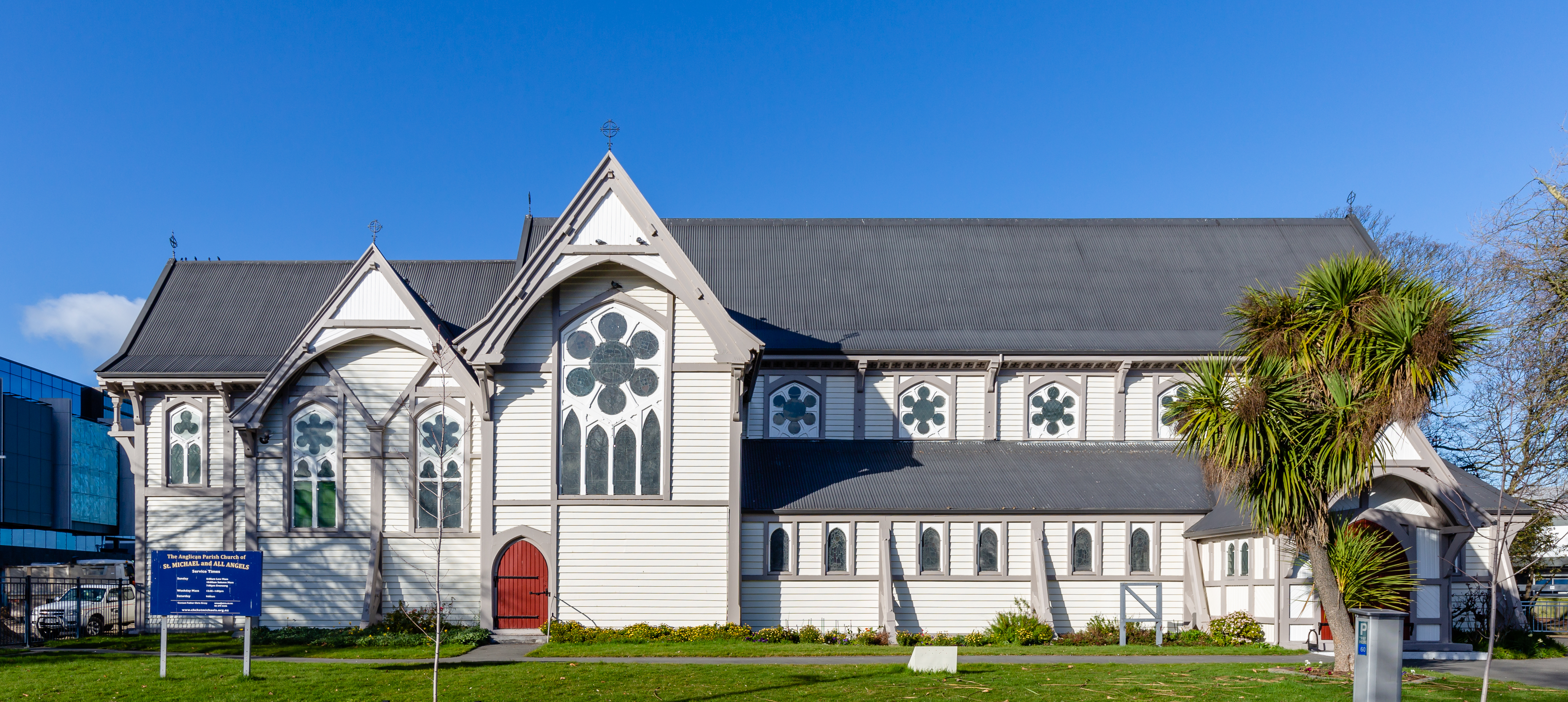
- St Michael and All Angels
- Church of St Michael and All Angels
- 43°32′04″S 172°37′59″E
- Location: 84 Oxford Terrace, Christchurch Central City
- Country: New Zealand
- Denomination: Anglican
- Churchmanship: Anglo-Catholic
- Website: chchstmichaels.org.nz

History
- Status: Church
- Founded: 29 September 1870
- Dedicated: 2 May 1872

Architecture
- Functional status: Active
- Heritage designation: Category I
- Designated: 2 April 1985
- Architects: William Fitzjohn Crisp (1870); Frederick Strouts (1871)
- Architectural type: Church
- Style: Gothic Revival

Administration
- Diocese: Christchurch

Clergy
- Vicar: Jordan Greatbach

The Church of St Michael and All Angels is an Anglican church located at 84 Oxford Terrace, Christchurch, New Zealand.

The church building is registered as Category I by Heritage New Zealand. Its freestanding belfry is registered separately.

== History ==
The structure stands on the site of the first church built by the Canterbury Association settlers in 1851. Henry Jacobs preached the sermon and conducted the service at the opening of the church in July 1851. St Michael & All Angels served as the pro-cathedral until the completion of ChristChurch Cathedral in 1881.

The architect of the current church was William Fitzjohn Crisp. He had come out from England in 1864 as the pupil of Robert Speechly who had been appointed by George Gilbert Scott to supervise the building of Christ Church Cathedral. The cornerstone of the church was laid in a ceremony on the Feast of St Michael & All Angels, 29 September 1870. However, problems with the construction of the building led to Crisp returning to Britain in 1871 and Frederick Strouts was appointed as supervising architect in June of that year. The building was completed in 1872. The contractor's name was James Schoolbraid (or Schoolbred) (1840–1924) and according to Strouts, he was a very obliging worker.

The church was opened on 2 May 1872. Because of a lack of money the chancel was not completed until 1875, and the planned bell tower and spire were never constructed. The church is constructed mostly of mataī timber on rubble stone foundations. It is one of the largest timber Gothic Revival churches in the Southern Hemisphere. The only alteration to the church structure has been the removal of a tie-beam and secondary arch to give a better view of the east window in 1896.

The separate belfry is a survival of the previous church building. It was designed by Benjamin Mountfort and constructed in 1861. The bell it houses was brought out with the First Four Ships in 1850 and was rung every hour of daylight to indicate time to the first settlers.

Alfred Averill came to New Zealand in 1894 to be vicar of St Michael and All Angels and rose to be Archbishop of New Zealand.

Associated with the church is St Michael's Church School.

== Heritage registration ==
The church was registered by the New Zealand Historic Places Trust as a Category I heritage building on 2 April 1985 with registration number 294. It is significant as it was the first church on the Canterbury Plains and was the pro-cathedral for some years. Architecturally, it is notable as a timber Gothic building. The belfry of the church is also recognised as a Category I structure. It was registered under number 295 on the same day.

== Earthquakes ==
The wooden building survived three major earthquakes in 2010/11 almost unscathed and is the only Anglican church that remained in use in the central city. The plans had been drawn with regard to the threat of tremors. At a meeting of parishioners held on 14 December 1869, the general concept for the new church was agreed on, including the building material: "Owing to the late severe shocks of earthquake the vestry came to the conclusion that it would be useless to attempt building any part of stone. Therefore it was decided that wood should be the material." The earthquake referred to was the one that hit Christchurch on 5 June 1869, with Julius von Haast giving some scientific commentary. St John's Church in Hereford Street, the first Anglican church in Christchurch built of permanent materials in 1864–1865, was damaged in that earthquake. The earthquake, centred under Addington or Spreydon, had an estimated magnitude of 5 and a ground shaking intensity of MMI 7.

In March 2011, a Lenten service at St Michael's and All Angels Church was attended by Victoria Matthews, Bishop of Christchurch, and Kevin Rudd, Australian Minister of Foreign Affairs. As part of the service, Rudd lit a candle in memory of those who died in the 22 February 2011 earthquake.

== The organ ==
The present fine Henry Bevington and Sons pipe organ was installed in 1873. It was enlarged in 1895/6 by Fincham and Hobday.

The organ was damaged in the 22 February 2011 earthquake and subsequently removed for repairs. A temporary replacement was an organ built from parts of instruments damaged during World War II bombing raids on Britain. The church is fund-raising to help meet the last of the NZ$500,000 organ restoration costs. The Bevington organ was reinstalled with improvements by the South Island Organ Company in 2013.

== List of vicars ==
The following vicars have served at St Michael and All Angels:

- Octavius Mathias, 1852–1860
- Henry Jacobs, 1863–1873
- Henry J. Edwards, 1873–1876
- Edward Gorton Penny, 1876–1881
- Walter Harper, 1882–1893
- Alfred Averill, 1894–1910
- Harry Darwin Burton, 1910–1915
- Charles E. Perry, 1916–1936
- Cecil Muschamp, 1937–1951
- Cecil Gault, 1951–1963
- Tim Raphael 1963–1965
- Philip Baker 1965–1986
- Ivan Smith 1986–1990
- Jonathan Kirkpatrick 1991–1996
- Peter Williams, 1997–2013
- Andrew Starky, 2013–2017
- Christopher Orczy, 2018–2022
- Jordan Greatbatch, 2023–present

== Gallery ==
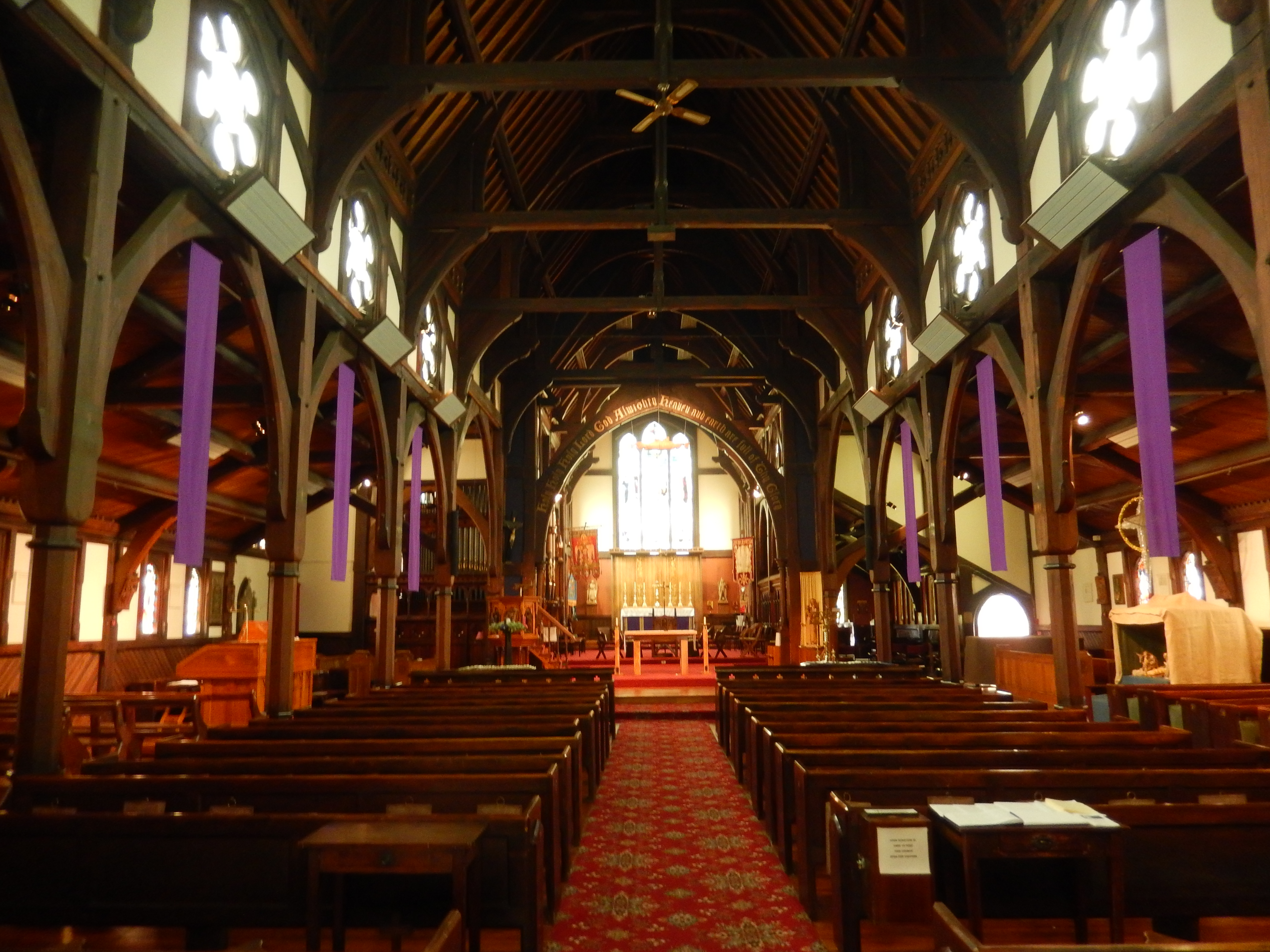
Interior looking towards the altar

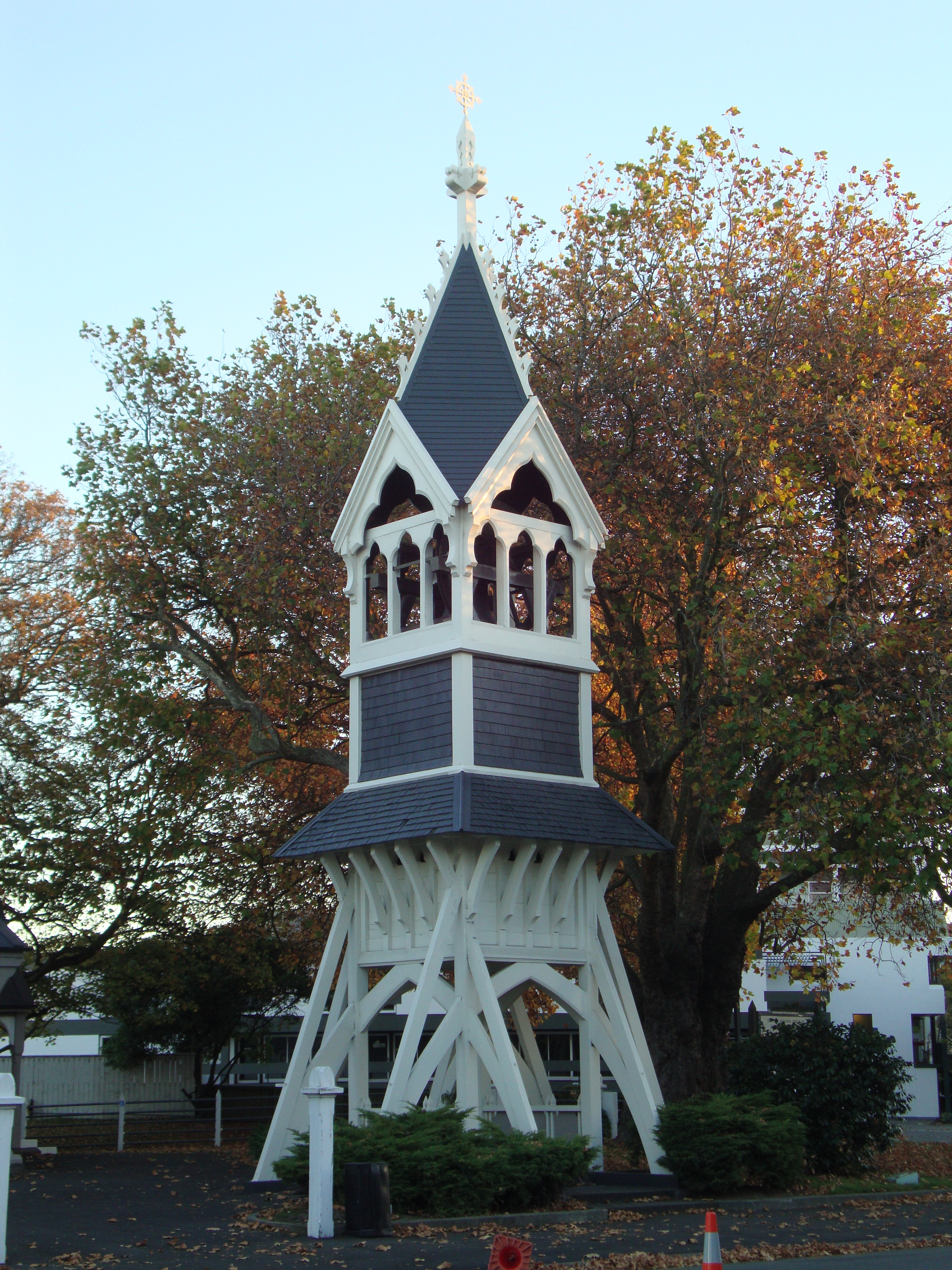
Belfry dating from 1861

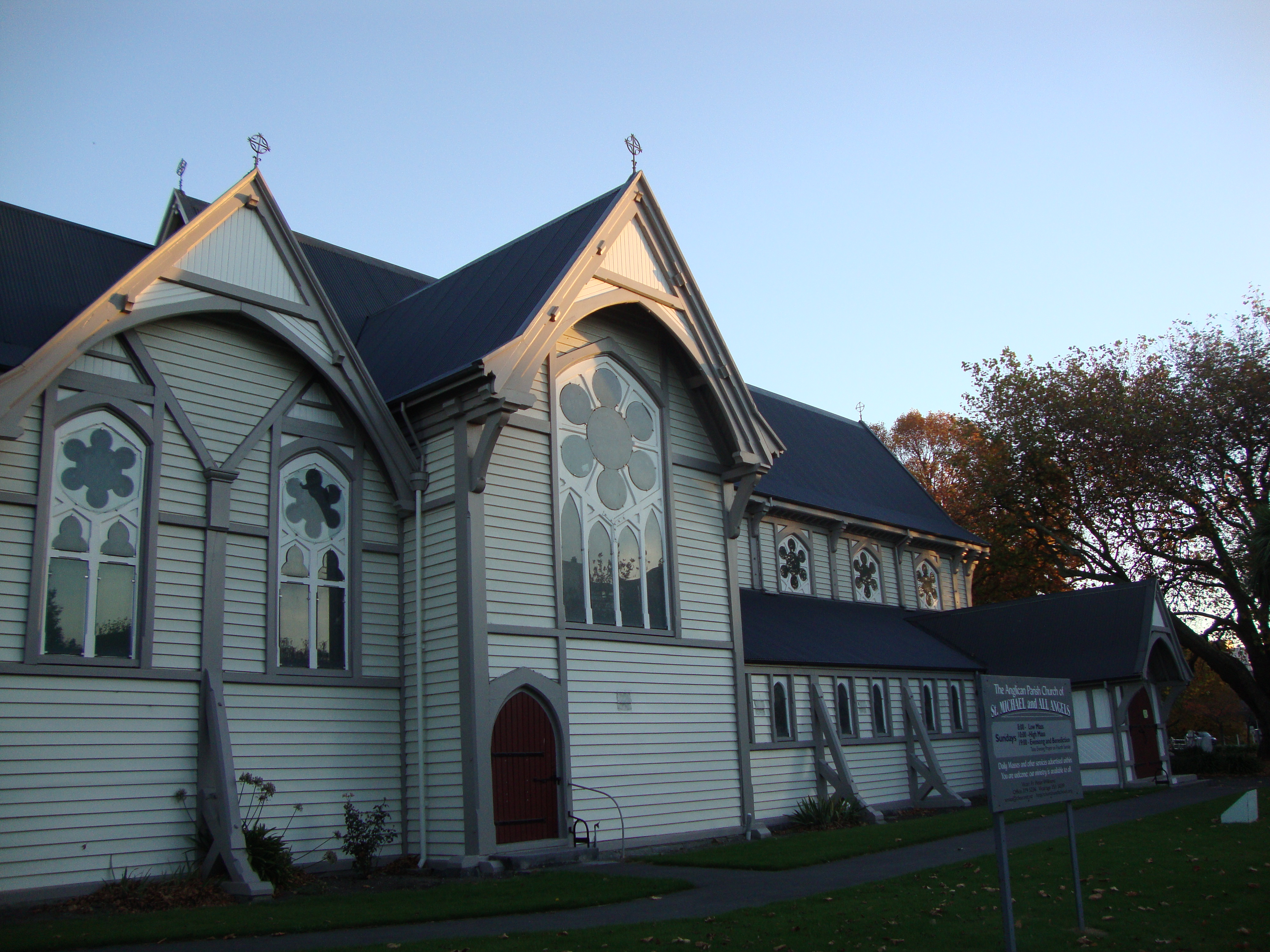
The Church from the north

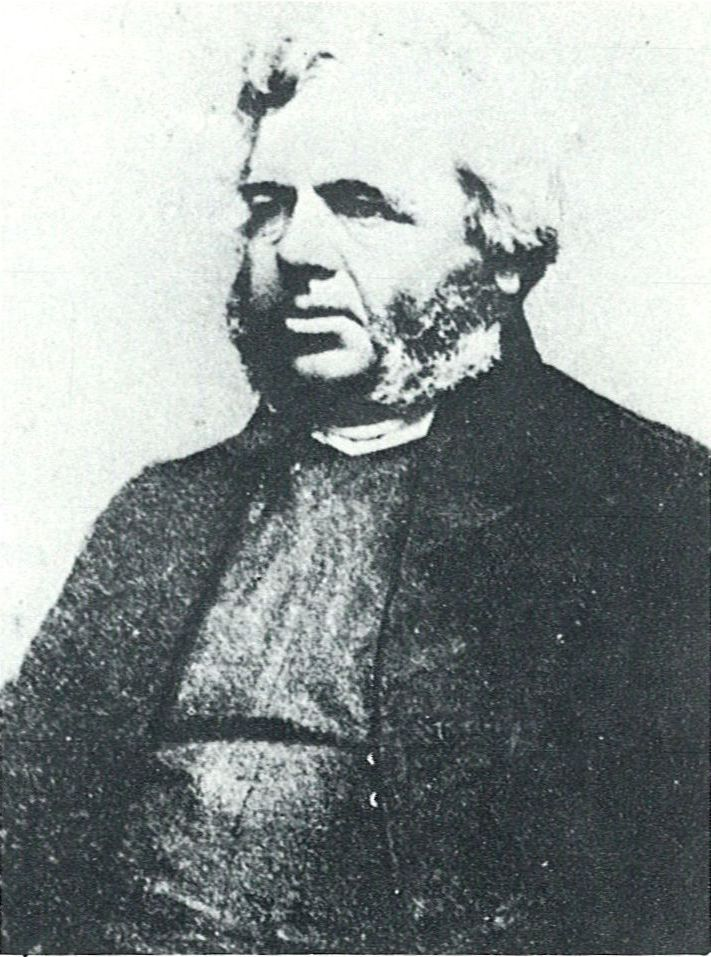
Vicar, Rev. Octavius Mathias

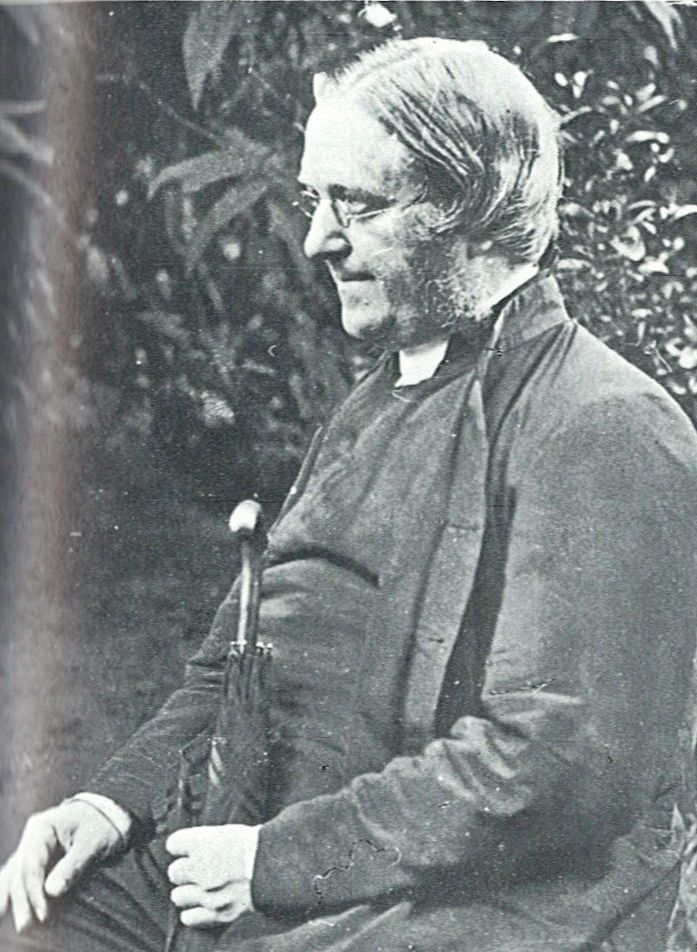
Vicar, Rev. Henry Jacobs

== See also ==
- List of oldest buildings in Christchurch
