= Basil Hooper =

New Zealand architect (1876–1960)

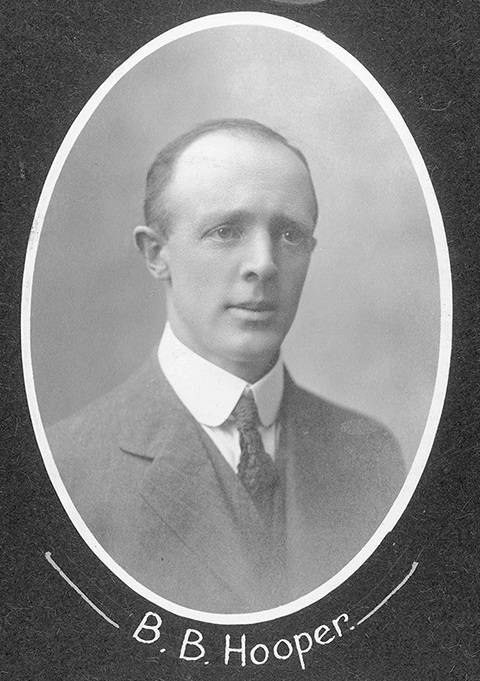
Basil Hooper in 1912, taken when he was a Roslyn Borough Councillor

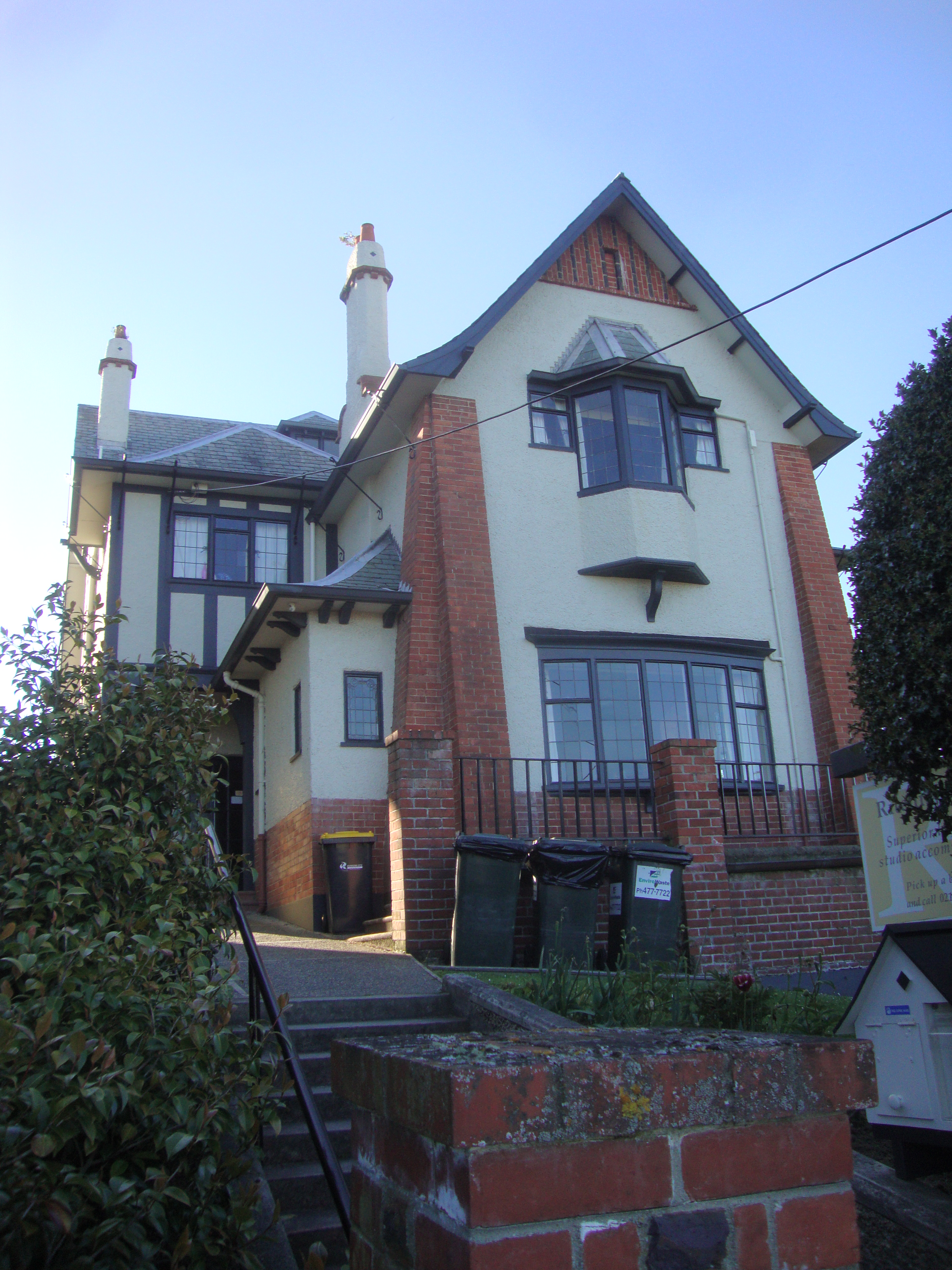
Ritchie House in Dunedin, built by Basil Hooper in 1914

Basil Bramston Hooper, ARIBA (17 April 1876–3 February 1960) was a New Zealand architect. He was born in Lahore, India on 17 April 1876. In 1896 Hooper was articled to the Dunedin architect James Louis Salmond for three years, leaving Salmond's office in December 1900. He later designed the H A Salmon residence on Claremont Street.

Hooper was one of Dunedin's leading architects in the arts and crafts movement, and many of the city's stately homes were designed by him. The Waddell Smith house in Ings Avenue is regarded as Hooper's earliest bungalow, although he also designed small, single-storey houses for the Windle Settlement, a group of early state houses in the suburb of Mornington. Hooper's style was characterised by complex roof geometry, buttresses, overhanging eaves, oriel windows and leaded lights, often with stained glass.

Hooper's houses revitalised domestic architecture in New Zealand prior to the First World War, and he also carried out commercial and ecclesiastical commissions. Hooper was the supervising architect for the new St Paul's Cathedral in Dunedin.

In 1948 he retired having weathered the lean architectural years of the 1930s and the Second World War. He died at Waiuku on 3 February 1960, survived by a daughter and a son.
