= Harry Stocker =

Anglican archdeacon

Harry Stocker (1840 – 22 April 1923) was Archdeacon of Southland from 1885 until he retired in 1913.

Stocker was born in Boughton under Blean, educated at Trinity College, Dublin and ordained deacon in 1868 and priest in 1869. After a curacy in Kingsclere, he came to New Zealand in 1873. He held incumbencies at Springston, Akaroa and St John, Invercargill.

He retired to Merivale, died on 22 April 1923 and is buried in the St Paul's cemetery at Papanui.
