= Anne van Gend =

New Zealand Anglican Bishop

Anne van Gend is the eleventh bishop of Dunedin, New Zealand.

== Early life and education ==
Born in South Africa, she worked as a music teacher and a music therapist, including posts as a music therapist and English and music teacher in Australia, Zambia and South Africa. Van Gend earned an A.Mus.A, a Bachelor of Arts from the University of Queensland, and a Graduate Diploma in Teaching from Griffith University. She has a Master of Theology from Brisbane College of Theology and a PhD from Victoria University of Wellington, which explored themes of atonement in teenage fantasy fiction. She received her secondary education at Grafton High School (New South Wales).

== Ministry ==
Van Gend was ordained as a deacon in 1996 and ordained as priest in 1997, serving in parishes in the Diocese of Grafton in northern New South Wales. She subsequently served in parishes in South West Queensland in the Anglican Diocese of Brisbane, as a Ministry Enabler in the Anglican Diocese of Auckland, and as Ministry Development Officer for the Anglican Diocese of the Northern Territory before becoming Executive Director of the Anglican Schools Office of Aotearoa New Zealand and Polynesia from 2014 until 2021.

She was nominated to be the eleventh Bishop of Dunedin in December 2024, and her appointment as bishop-elect was confirmed that month. She was consecrated in St Paul's Cathedral, Dunedin on March 29, 2025.

== Personal life ==
Bishop Anne is married to Rev Dr. Michael Godfrey, a priest in the Diocese of Dunedin, and has two sons, six step-daughters and nine step-grandchildren in Australia.

== Published works ==
- van Gend, Anne (2024). Restoring the Story: The Good News of Atonement. SCM Press. ISBN 978-0-334-06619-4.
