= Walter Hurst =

Walter Edmund Wilmshurst Hurst CBE (1912–1987) was an Anglican priest in the mid 20th century.

Hurst was educated at Trinity College, Dublin and ordained in 1936. After curacies at Drumachose and Lower Hutt he was a Chaplain to the New Zealand Armed Forces during World War II. When peace returned he held incumbencies at Waiwhetū, Stratford and New Plymouth. He was Dean of Dunedin from 1956 to 1963; and Dean of Wellington from 1963 to 1977.

In the 1976 Queen's Birthday Honours, Hurst was appointed a Commander of the Order of the British Empire, for services to the community.
