= Penny Jamieson =

Bishop of Dunedin

The Right Reverend Penny Jamieson DCNZM
- Bishop of Dunedin
- Church: Anglican Church of New Zealand
- Diocese: Diocese of Dunedin
- In office: 1989–2004

Orders
- Ordination: 1985
- Consecration: 29 June 1990

Personal details
- Born: Penelope Ann Bansall Allen; 21 June 1942 (age 84) Chalfont St Giles, Buckinghamshire, England
- Spouse: Ian Jamieson (m. 1964; died 2026)
- Children: 3
- Education: Wycombe High School; University of Edinburgh; Victoria University of Wellington

Penelope Ann Bansall Jamieson DCNZM (née Allen; born 21 June 1942) is a retired Anglican bishop. She was the seventh bishop of Dunedin in the Anglican Church of New Zealand, from 1989 until her retirement in 2004. Jamieson was the second woman in the world, after Barbara Harris, to hold the position of bishop in the Anglican Communion and the first to be elected a diocesan bishop.

== Early life ==
Born in Chalfont St Giles, Buckinghamshire, England, in 1942, Jamieson attended Wycombe High School and studied linguistics at the University of Edinburgh before moving to New Zealand, her husband's country of birth. She has three daughters. She worked at the Wellington Inner City Mission while completing her doctoral thesis at Victoria University of Wellington on English language acquisition by Tokelaun children.

== Ordained ministry ==
In 1982, she was ordained a deacon and then a priest in 1983. She was assistant curate of St James' Lower Hutt from 1982 to 1985. In 1985, she was vicar of Karori West with Mākara in the Diocese of Wellington.

In 1990 she was elected to head the country's southernmost diocese, the Diocese of Dunedin. She was consecrated a bishop on 29 June 1990. She spoke publicly about the difficulties of being the world's first woman diocesan bishop. For instance, her ordination as bishop was not attended by the Anglican Bishop of Aotearoa (Whakahuihui Vercoe) and the Catholic Bishop of Dunedin, (Leonard Boyle).

On 15 March 2004 she announced her retirement. At her retirement, after 14 years as Bishop of Dunedin, Jamieson expressed her regret that no other woman had been elected a bishop in New Zealand.

== Personal life ==
She married Ian Jamieson, an academic specialising in Scottish and medieval English literature, in 1964, and the couple had three children. Ian Jamieson died in 2026.

In the 2004 Queen's Birthday Honours, Jamieson was appointed a Distinguished Companion of the New Zealand Order of Merit, for services to the community. In 2009, following the restoration of titular honours by the New Zealand government, she declined redesignation as a Dame Companion of the New Zealand Order of Merit.

== Works ==
- Living at the Edge: sacrament and solidarity in leadership, Jamieson, P. A. B London, Mowbray 1997 ISBN 0-264-67439-1

Anglican Communion titles
Preceded by Peter Mann	Bishop of Dunedin; 1990–2004	Succeeded by George Connor
