= Alfred Button =

New Zealand Anglican cleric

Alfred Cleave Hammond Button was the Dean of Dunedin from 1945 until 1956.

Button was educated at Selwyn College, Otago and ordained in 1913. After a curacy at St. Paul's Cathedral, Dunedin he was Priest in charge at Lawrence then Vicar of Waimea Plains. He then held further incumbencies at Caversham, Waikouaiti and Roslyn. He was Archdeacon of Central Otago from 1934 to 1945.
