= Al-Huda Mosque, Dunedin =

Mosque in Dunedin, New Zealand

Al-Huda Mosque
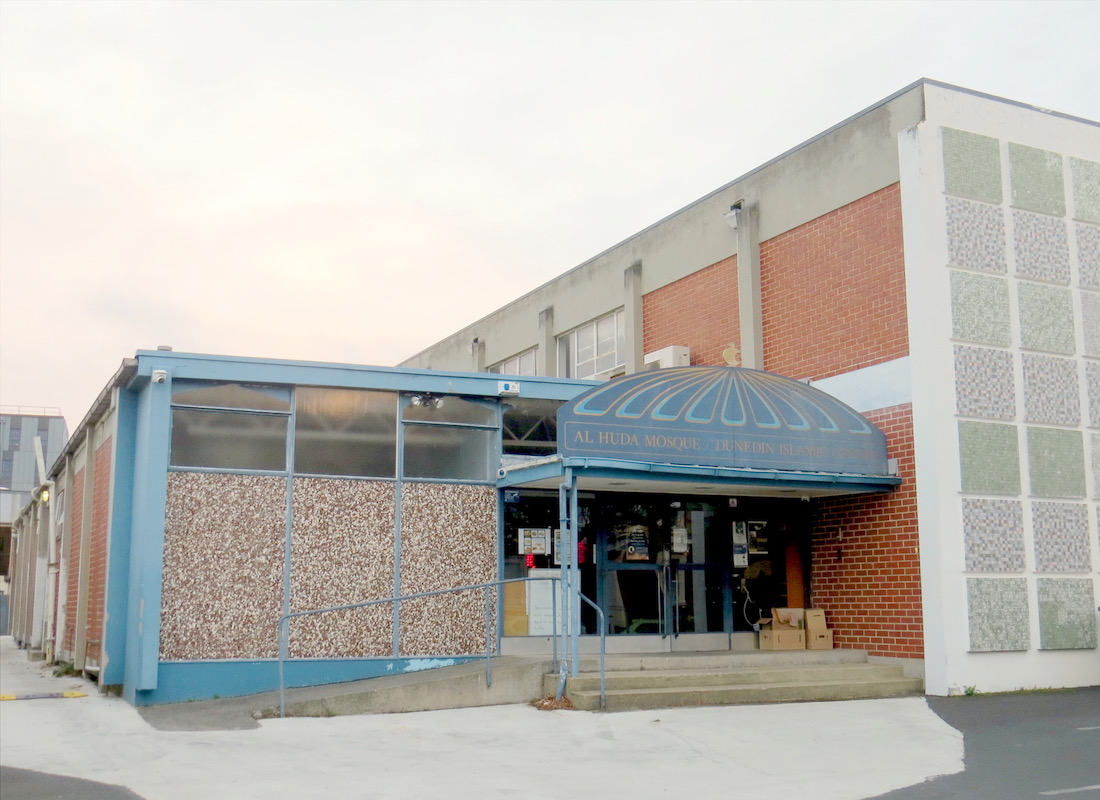

Religion
- Affiliation: Islam

Location
- Municipality: Dunedin
- Country: New Zealand
- Interactive map of Al-Huda Mosque
- Administration: Otago Muslim Association
- Coordinates: 45.86917°S 170.51522°E

Architecture
- Established: 2000

Al-Huda Mosque is a mosque in central Dunedin, New Zealand. Established in December 2000 by the Otago Muslim Association, it was the first mosque in the southern part of New Zealand. The mosque serves Muslims in Dunedin and surrounding towns, with a congregation that includes international students and migrants. It also functions as a centre for religious, educational and social activities, hosting community programmes and interfaith gatherings. Following the 2019 Christchurch mosque attacks, it became a focal point for local expressions of solidarity and community support.

== Overview ==
Muslims began settling in Dunedin in greater numbers during the late 20th century, with many arriving as international students or new migrants. In 1990 the community, through the newly founded Otago Muslim Association, purchased a former warehouse in the city centre and converted it into a mosque. The mosque was established in 2000.

Over time, Al-Huda Mosque has become more than just a place of prayer. It has hosted language classes, youth programmes and interfaith gatherings, and in 2019 the community began exploring plans for expansion to meet the needs of its growing congregation.

The mosque was originally one of the intended targets for the Christchurch mosque shootings, but ultimately was changed to be the Al Noor Mosque and the Linwood Islamic Centre both of which are in Christchurch. After the aftermath of the mosque shootings in March 2019, Al-Huda Mosque became a place of mourning and solidarity. Vigils and open days drew thousands of Dunedin residents, and community leaders described the tragedy as "a wake-up call for all of us", calling for greater understanding and unity.

=== Administration ===
The mosque is run by the Otago Muslim Association, which manages services, educational programmes, and interfaith initiatives across the region.

== History ==
The mosque is at 21 Clyde Street, in the university area, and occupies a former building of about 700 square metres that includes a large sports hall used for Friday prayers. The Otago Muslim Association, incorporated in 1995, took five and a half years to raise the money to buy the building, and the mosque was established in December 2000. Its daily running is managed by the executive of the Muslim University Students' Association, which the association appoints.

In 2019 the association said the mosque had about 750 members, including more than 500 refugees from Syria, Afghanistan and Palestine who had settled in the city, and began fundraising $100,000 for upgrades and security after the Christchurch shootings. Its president, Mohammed Rizwan, said the building had no emergency exits. In 2021 the association discussed adding a second floor with classrooms for Sunday school, redeveloping the foyer, upgrading the ablution facilities and installing commercial kitchens so the mosque could be hired out.

== See also ==
- Islam in New Zealand
- List of mosques in Oceania
