= Steve Benford =

New Zealand Anglican bishop

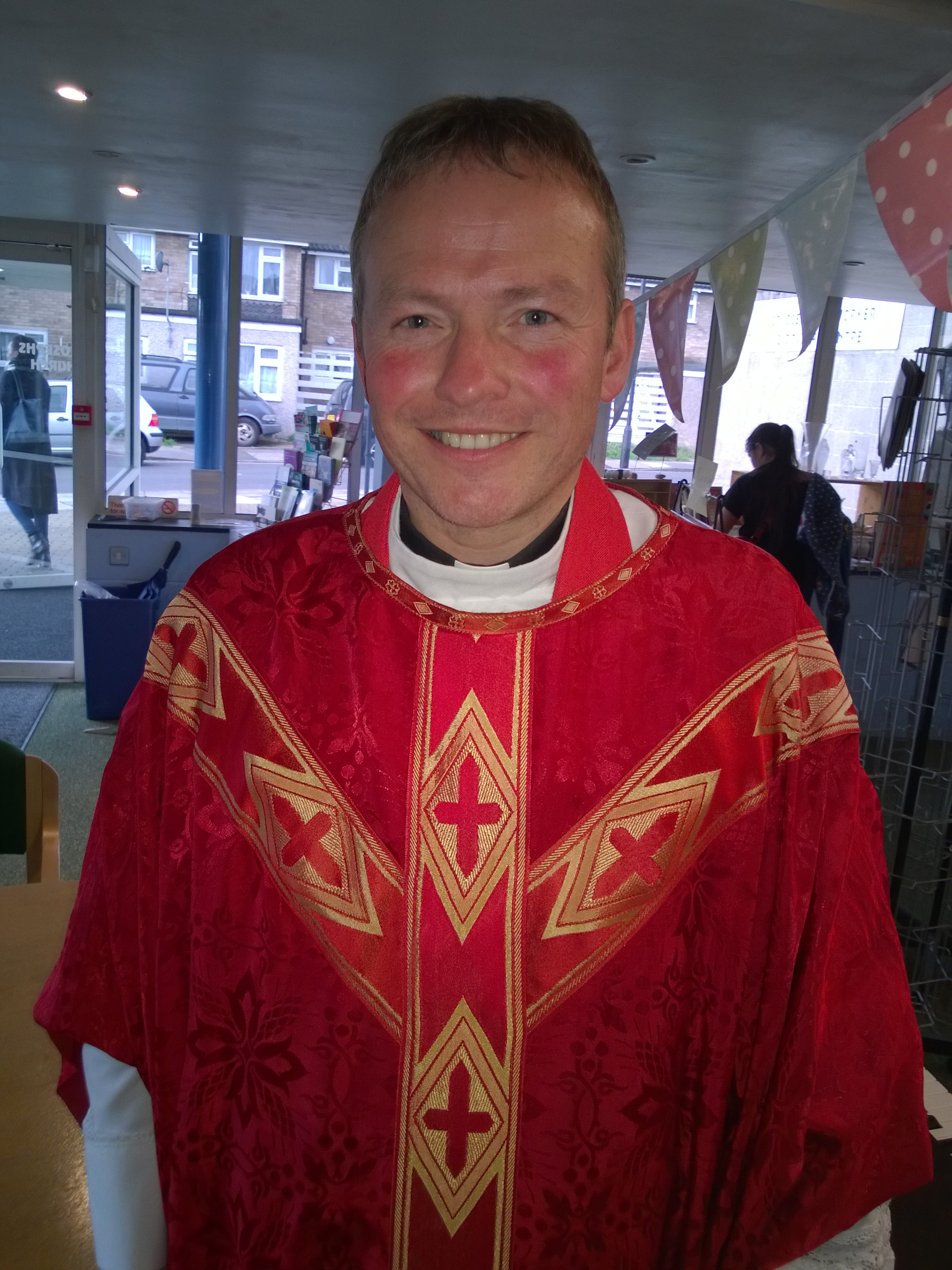
Benford at a Sunday service in October 2015

Steven Benford (born 14 August 1961) is a New Zealand Anglican bishop. He was the tenth bishop of Dunedin, New Zealand, ordained and installed on 22 September 2017. In a letter issued to the diocese on February 1 2024, Benford announced his retirement effective from May 2024.
