= Anglican Diocese of Dunedin =

Anglican Church diocese in New Zealand

Diocese of Dunedin
- Arms of the Diocese of Dunedin
- Incumbent; Anne van Gend
- Style: The Right Reverend

Location
- Country: New Zealand
- Territory: South Island
- Ecclesiastical province: Aotearoa, New Zealand and Polynesia
- Headquarters: Dunedin

Statistics
- Parishes: 30 (date unknown)

Information
- First holder: Henry Jenner (disputed)
- Formation: 1866
- Denomination: Anglican
- Cathedral: St Paul's Cathedral

Current leadership
- Parent church: Anglican Communion
- Major Archbishop: Primate of New Zealand; Pīhopa Mātāmua
- Diocesan bishop: Anne van Gend

Website
- www.calledsouth.org.nz

The Diocese of Dunedin is one of the thirteen dioceses and hui amorangi (Māori bishoprics) of the Anglican Church in Aotearoa, New Zealand and Polynesia.

The diocese covers the same area as the provinces of Otago and Southland in the South Island of New Zealand; or approximately 65,990 square kilometres (25,480 mi^{2}), with a population 272,541 (in 2001). Anglicans are traditionally the third largest religious group in Otago and Southland after Presbyterians and Roman Catholics.

The Bishop of Dunedin's cathedra is at St. Paul's Cathedral, Dunedin.

== Coat of arms ==
The Diocesan Seal (based on an 1871 seal of Bishop Nevill) was authorised by Synod in 1921 and commissioned on 15 October 1931. An official certificate was issued in 1949 to Bishop Fitchett confirming the crest i.e., a Gules, a Saltire between four Mullets Argent surrounded by an open Bible”. Gules describes a darker shade of red, mullet means a straight sided star with “argent” being the white border to the star. The stars most likely refer to the Southern Cross. Saltire refers to the Saint Andrew’s Cross or the crux decussata, a heraldic symbol in the form of a diagonal cross. The word comes from the Middle French sautoir, Medieval Latin saltatorial.

== History ==
In 1814, the Gospel first preached in Aotearoa at Oihi, Northland by Anglican missionary Samuel Marsden, in 1841 George Selwyn consecrated and appointed Bishop of New Zealand (including Polynesia and Melanesia). In 1843 the first Anglican missionaries to come to Southland and Otago were Tamihana Te Rauparaha and Matene Te Whiwhi. In 1852 Rev. John Fenton arrives in Dunedin; he was the first Anglican priest to settle south of Lyttelton. In 1856 when the Diocese of New Zealand was subdivided, Southland and Otago were included in the Diocese of Christchurch. In 1866 Henry Lascelles Jenner selected and ordained by the Archbishop of Canterbury “into the office of a Bishop of the United Church of England and Ireland in the colony of New Zealand”, with the intention that he be Bishop of Dunedin. In 1869 the Diocese of Dunedin formed from the Diocese of Christchurch. The first meeting of Dunedin's synod rejected Jenner's claim to the See 1871 Samuel Nevill enthroned as 1st bishop of Dunedin.

The Diocese has declined in numbers in the 21st Century, leading to the closing and selling of many Churches, including the historic church in Clyde, and the largest church in Invercargill, which among others, were sold against the wishes of the local communities. It is currently exploring new ways of connecting with remote and rural communities through a rural chaplaincy initiative.

== Parishes and churchmanship ==
The diocese has a total of 30 parishes, deaneries, Cathedral District and local churches. The adaption of "Local Shared Ministry" has been a strategy by which local people are ordained to serve in a parish which cannot afford to support full-time professional clergy.

The diocese includes Anglo-Catholic, broad and Evangelical parishes.

== List of bishops ==
In 1990, the diocese made history by electing Penny Jamieson as their seventh bishop. Jamieson was the first woman to become a diocesan bishop in the Anglican Communion and only the second woman consecrated bishop, the first being Bishop Barbara Harris. The eighth bishop was the Right Revd George Connor, who became Bishop of Dunedin in 2005. The diocese gained some publicity in 2006 when (with the support of the Diocesan Standing Committee), Connor ordained an openly gay man to the diaconate. A moratorium on ordinations in the diocese was declared until the New Zealand church achieved a common mind on the full inclusion of homosexual persons at every level of ministry in the church. Connor retired in November 2009. The ninth Bishop of Dunedin, Kelvin Wright, was installed in February 2010 and retired in April 2017. He was succeeded by Steven Benford previously Vicar of The Church of St. Joseph the Worker in North London, who was consecrated and installed in September 2017. He relinquished his charge in May 2024.

The following individuals have served as the Bishop of Dunedin, or any precursor title:

Bishops of Dunedin
Ordinal	Officeholder	Term start	Term end	Notes
1	Henry Jenner	1866	1871	Disputed; see Dunedin Controversy
2	Samuel Nevill	1871	1919	Primate of New Zealand from 1904; resigned both in ill-health, 1 July 1919
3	Isaac Richards	1920	1934	
4	William Fitchett	1934	1952	
5	Allen Johnston	1953	1969	Translated to Waikato; later Archbishop of New Zealand
6	Walter Robinson	1969	1975	
7	Peter Mann	1976	1989	
8	Penny Jamieson	1989	2004	
9	George Connor	2005	2009	Translated from Bay of Plenty, Diocese of Waiapu; Convening Bishop (New Zealand dioceses), 2005–2009; Co-Presiding Bishop / Pīhopa Aporei (Tikanga Pākehā), 2004–2006
10	Kelvin Wright	2010	2017	
11	Steven Benford	2017	2024	
12	Anne van Gend	2025	present	

== Archdeaconries ==
In 1886, there were three archdeaconries: Edward Edwards was Archdeacon of Dunedin, George Beaumont of Invercargill and Queenstown and John Fenton of Oamaru; within a year, Harry Stocker had also become an archdeacon.

== Social service organisations ==
- The South Centre, Invercargill.
- Anglican Family Care Centre, Dunedin.

== School ==
- St Hilda's Collegiate School, Dunedin

== University hall of residence ==
- Selwyn College founded in 1893 is the oldest college for students at the University of Otago.

== Homes for the aged ==
- St Barnabas Home, Dunedin
- Parata Home, Gore
- North Otago Anglican Homes for the Aged, Oamaru

== Orphanage ==
In the past the diocese operated St Mary's Orphanage, Dunedin.

== Religious orders ==
- The Community of Sisters of the Church was active in the diocese from the end of the 19th century until the 1930s. They were invited by Bishop Nevill to found a school for girls. They founded St Hilda's Collegiate School.

== Companion dioceses ==
- Edinburgh
- Eastern Zambia
