= Samuel Nevill =

Samuel Tarratt Nevill (13 May 1837 – 29 October 1921), was the first Anglican Bishop of Dunedin, before becoming Primate of New Zealand.

== Life ==
A scion of the ancient Nevilles, he was educated at Nottingham High School, before attending St Aidan's College, Birkenhead, and briefly Trinity College, Dublin. He was ordained in 1860 and then went up to Magdalene College, Cambridge, where he graduated B.A. (second-class Natural Science Tripos) in 1865, proceeding M.A. in 1868, and received D.D. in 1871.

Ordained in 1860 as Curate of St Mark's, Scarisbrick, he then became Rector of Shelton, an industrial parish in Staffordshire where he was incumbent until being elevated to the episcopate. Whilst there, Nevill also held a certificate of the Science and Art Department, South Kensington, qualifying him to instruct candidates for examination in the Education Department, and was thus instrumental in laying the foundation of the career of some who have attained positions of eminence.

In 1871 Nevill accepted the bishopric of Dunedin and was consecrated in the pro-cathedral by Bishop Harper, Primate of New Zealand and Bishops Suter of Nelson, Hadfield of Wellington, and Williams of Waiapu.

He served as Primate of New Zealand from 1904 until 1919 (acting Primate since 1902), being twice called to attend the Lambeth Conference. With family money he founded Selwyn College, Otago in 1893.

Dr Nevill died at Bishopsgrove, near Dunedin, New Zealand being buried at St Barnabas Church, Warrington. At his death, he was the senior bishop in the Anglican Communion. The Nevill Chapel of St. Paul's Cathedral, Dunedin is named in his memory; St Paul's has a carving depicting the Lord Bishop holding a model of the Cathedral's proposed design

Nevill married first, at Heavitree, Devon, in 1863, Mary Susannah Cook Penny (a relative of the Viscounts Marchwood), who died in 1905. In 1906, he married second Rosalind Fynes-Clinton (died 1972), daughter of Rev Canon Geoffrey Fynes-Clinton (1847–1934), a distant cousin of the Dukes of Newcastle; he had no children by either marriage, but acted as the adoptive father of his brother Edmund Berrey Nevill's son, Edmund Robert Nevill (1862-1933), following his brother's untimely death in 1875.

== See also ==
- Archbishop of New Zealand
- St Paul's Cathedral, Dunedin
