= Ida Carey =

New Zealand artist and art teacher (1891–1982)

- Born: 3 October 1891; Taonui, New Zealand
- Died: 23 August 1982 (aged 90); Hamilton, New Zealand
- Known for: Painting

Ida Harriet Carey (3 October 1891 – 23 August 1982) was a New Zealand artist and art teacher. She was well known for portraits of Māori men, women, including the Māori Queen Dame Te Atairangikaahu, and children.

== Early life ==
Ida Harriet Carey was born on 3 October 1891 at Taonui, near Feilding in the Manawatu. She was one of four children of Richard Carey, a farmer who had emigrated to New Zealand from Australia in the 1870s, and his wife Elizabeth née Keeble. She studied music and became a piano teacher. In 1910, the Carey family moved to Tuhikaramea, near Hamilton. A few years later, Carey moved to Te Aroha, on the Kaimai Ranges, and then to nearby Matamata by 1921.

== Painting career ==
Carey painted from an early age and in 1921 the war artist Horace Moore-Jones saw her work. He encouraged her to study in Sydney under John Samuel Watkins, and later that year Carey made the first of several trips to Australia for tuition during the 1920s and 1930s. In 1924, She was elected a member of the Royal Art Society of New South Wales and her work featured regularly in their exhibitions. She became well known in New Zealand as well; in 1926, Cecil Cherrington, the Bishop of Waikato commissioned her to paint a triptych in oils for the altar of his private chapel at St. Peter's Cathedral in Hamilton and two years later she had her first exhibition at the New Zealand Academy of Fine Arts. Her work was the subject of favourable reviews; the Sydney Bulletin described her paintings at a 1929 exhibition as "fresh and vivid". There was some criticism of her larger works; a reviewer in Art in New Zealand noted that these had technical defects.

Carey supported herself financially by working as an art teacher. The first position she took as a relieving teacher at Auckland Training College in 1930. She later taught at local secondary schools, and held a permanent position at Hamilton High School from 1945 to 1949. Development of the local art scene was important to her and in August 1934, Carey and a friend, fellow artist Adele Younghusband, established the Waikato Society of Arts. Carey would remain involved with the society for almost 50 years, serving two terms as president, from 1945 to 1948 and 1952 to 1954.

In 1937, Carey's painting titled Study, was included in the Royal British Colonial Exhibition in London. The work was subsequently selected for the National Centennial Exhibition, held in 1940. The following year, she returned to Sydney to study under Antonio Dattilo Rubbo, an Italian painter. She stayed there for six months.

== Later life ==
In the 1950s, Carey travelled to Europe and a series of works were produced from the experience, including portraits of actors and dancers from the theatrical scene in London. She was involved in a motor accident in 1963, which saw her hospitalised for three months. During her convalescence she was inspired to start a new art project: to produce a portrait of every living Māori woman with a moko. This work took ten years, during which she travelled around the North Island finding sitters and painting their portraits on the condition that they be given to local galleries and museums. She was allowed to produce and sell copies. The work Amohia Tuhua, one of the first from the series, was joint winner of the 1968 Kelliher award for portraiture. Carey completed over 100 portraits, including a portrait of the Māori Queen, Dame Te Atairangikaahu. Two exhibitions of this work were held, in 1981 and the following year.

By 1969 Carey had retired from teaching but still took students for private lessons. She was also a life member of the Waikato Society of Arts, being conferred with this status in 1964.

== Death and legacy ==
In poor health, Carey vacated her residence in 1980 and moved to the Trevellyn Home, a retirement village, in Hamilton. When she moved, at least 1353 paintings were stored at her home and at least thirty of these were donated to the city. At Trevellyn, she still painted, albeit increasingly with her left hand as her right became arthritic. She died at Trevellyn on 23 August 1982, having made a significant cultural contribution to Hamilton.

The Ida Carey Gallery at the Waikato Museum Te Whare Taonga o Waikato is named in her honour. The museum subsequently held a retrospective exhibition of her work in 2018, which featured companion works by other female New Zealand artists. The playwright Campbell Smith wrote a play based on the life of Carey, titled Ada and I, which was performed in Hamilton in 2014.
