= Rathkeale College =

School near Masterton, New Zealand

Location
- Willow Park Drive, Masterton, Wellington Region, New Zealand; 40.8993°S 175.6865°E

Information
- Type: trinity school single sex boys (Years 9–13)
- Motto: Latin: Nil mortalibus ardui est "Nothing is impossible for mortal man"
- Established: 1963; 63 years ago
- Ministry of Education Institution no.: 245
- Principal: Martin O’Grady
- Enrolment: 316 (July 2026)
- Socio-economic decile: 9Q
- Website: rathkeale.school.nz

Rathkeale College is a state-integrated Anglican boys secondary school on the outskirts of Masterton, New Zealand.

== History ==
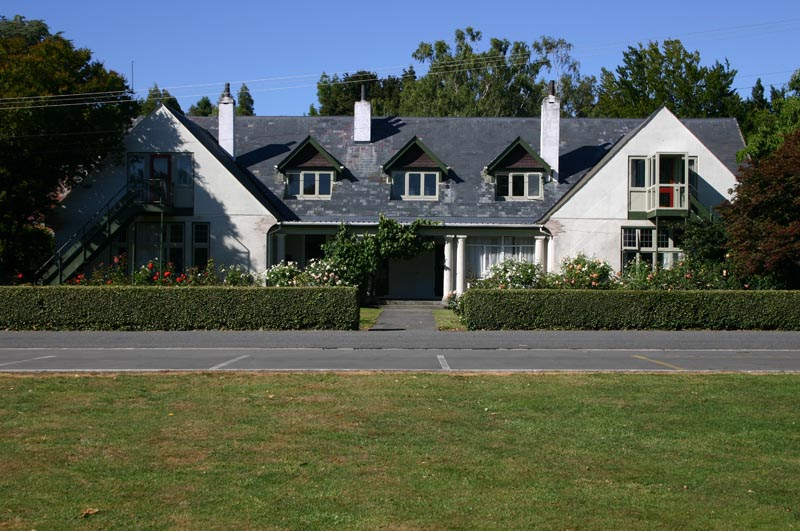
School House, former Rathkeale Homestead

Rathkeale College was established in 1963 to complete the family of schools managed by the St Matthew's Schools Trust Board, which already had a girls school in St Matthew's Collegiate School and a preparatory school in Hadlow School. The foundation Headmaster was E.J. Norman, a housemaster from Christ's College in Christchurch, while the deputy headmaster was Bruce Hamilton, also of Christ's. The school was established in the homestead of Rathkeale farm, previously owned by the Maunsell family. The Rathkeale homestead is now known as School House.

The school was officially opened in 1963 by Governor General Brigadier Sir Bernard Fergusson. The school was officially called St. Matthew's Collegiate School for Boys, but has always been known as Rathkeale College, after the farm on which it was situated. The farm's name comes from Rathkeale in County Limerick, Ireland, where the Maunsell family was originally from.

== Current ==
=== Governance ===
As a state-integrated school, the school buildings and land are owned by the Trinity Schools Trust Board, a registered charity managed by a Board of Proprietors, chaired by John Kirkup, while the school is governed by a board of trustees chaired by Mark Owen.

=== Staff ===
Current senior staff positions:

- Principal: Adam Gordon (Acting)
- Deputy Principals: Willie Shafer, Michelle Norris

=== Houses ===
Boys are split into three houses to compete in various sporting, cultural and academic competitions. The houses are named after old English schools; Rugby House, Cranleigh House, and Repton House. In 2009 sports competitions between the houses were named Halberg, after gold medallist runner Sir Murray Halberg, Hillary, after mountaineer Sir Edmund Hillary, and Blake, after yachtsman Sir Peter Blake.

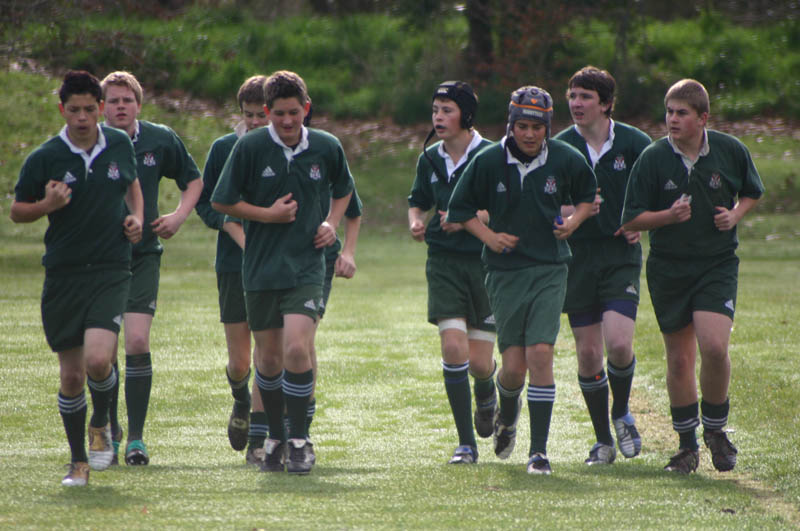
Rugby team training

=== Sport ===
Both summer and winter sport is compulsory at Rathkeale College, with a wide range of sports offered. The main summer sports are cricket and tennis, while the main winter sports are rugby, hockey and association football. Rathkeale College has sports exchanges with Christ's College, Lindisfarne College, Hutt International Boys' School, Wanganui Collegiate, Scots College and St. Patrick's College, Silverstream.

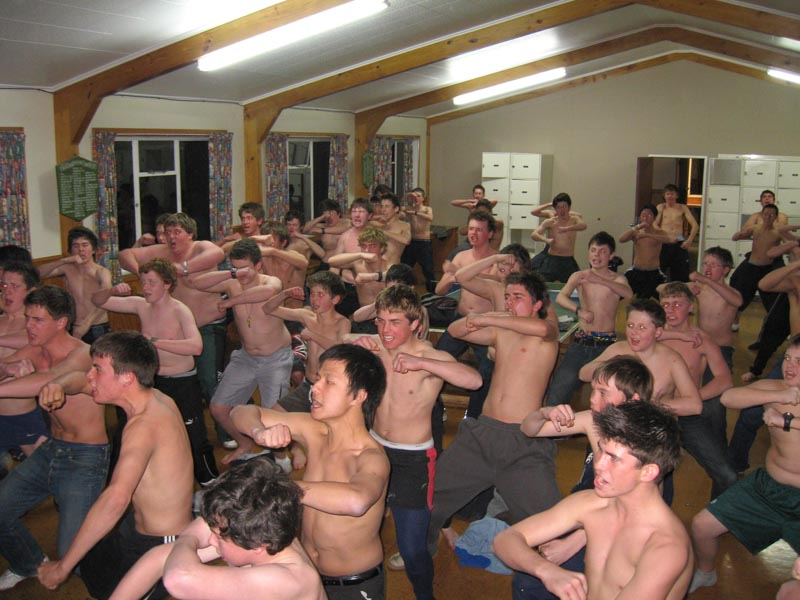
A house haka

=== Culture ===
Houses compete in a range of cultural competitions, including a House music (choral and band) competition, House haka competition, and in previous years, a House drama competition. The college also offers lessons in many musical instruments, as well as the Viva Camerata choir, combined with St. Matthew's Collegiate, and also two smaller groups: A barbershop quartet founded in 2018 and a male octet (Stars) formed in 2019. Many small drama performances are produced by drama classes or for the Shelia Winn Shakespeare Festival, as well as a major school production being produced every year, which usually alternates between dramas and musicals. Past shows have included Guys and Dolls, King Lear, Joseph and the Amazing Technicolor Dreamcoat, The Crucible, Footloose, Les Misérables and Twelfth Night.

=== Special character ===
As a State Integrated school, Rathkeale must have a "special character" to justify its existence. Rathkeale College's special character includes being single-sex (until year 12), a boarding school, and having compulsory sport participation. However, the main factor is its Anglican religion. Boys attend weekly chapel services, and junior boys take religious education lessons. This special character has recently been enhanced by the purchase of a chapel for the school – St. Martin's on the Close, formerly St. Martin's Church, Mangaweka. The chapel was purchased, moved and restored by the Friends of St. Martin's Trust. Former Board of Trustees chair Robyn Prior received the Bishop's Medal from Bishop of Wellington Tom Brown for her services in acquiring and restoring the chapel.
