= Anashuya Fletcher =

Sri Lanka-born New Zealand Anglican bishop

The Right Reverend Anashuya Fletcher
- Assistant Bishop of Wellington
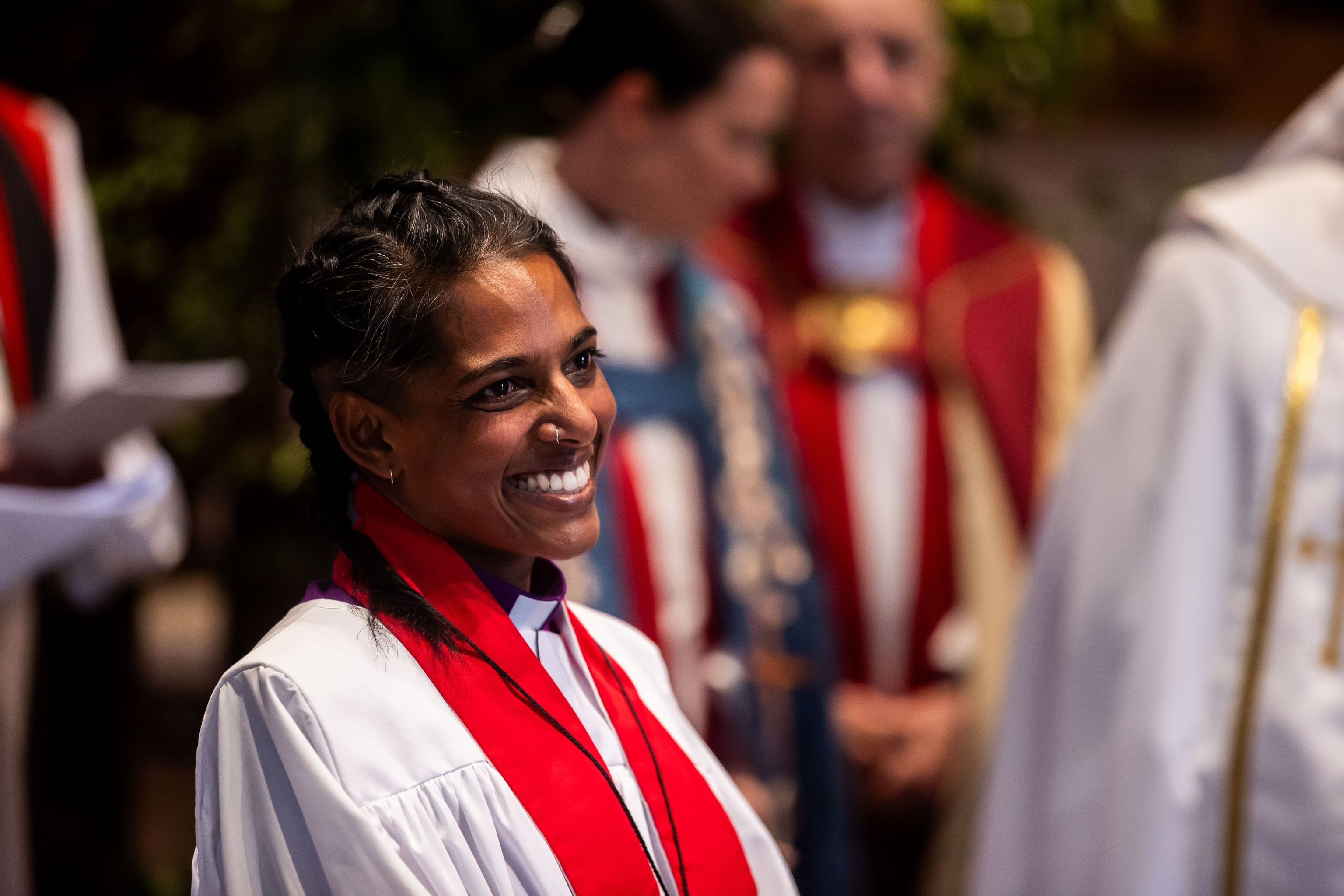
- Anashuya Fletcher being installed as Assistant Bishop of Wellington.
- Church: Anglican Church in Aotearoa, New Zealand and Polynesia
- Diocese: Wellington
- In office: 2024–present
- Predecessor: Eleanor Sanderson

Orders
- Ordination: 17 November 2018 (priesthood) by Justin Duckworth
- Consecration: 13 April 2024 by Don Tamihere

Personal details
- Born: 1984 (age 41–42) Sri Lanka
- Spouse: Paul Fletcher
- Children: 2

Anashuya "Ana" Fletcher, née Richards, (born 1984) is a Sri Lanka-born New Zealand Anglican bishop. She has been assistant bishop in the Anglican Diocese of Wellington since 2024.

== Biography ==
Fletcher was born in Sri Lanka to Tamil Christian parents and immigrated with her family to New Zealand to escape civil war around the age of one. She grew up in Auckland, trained as an attorney and worked as a solicitor and in human rights law at International Justice Mission before entering ordained ministry. She and her husband, Paul Fletcher, also co-founded social enterprises like a fair-trade coffee shop and Common Good Coffee.

Fletcher was ordained to the priesthood at Wellington Cathedral alongside her husband in 2018. The Fletchers, who have two young children, were appointed co-priests in charge at St. Peter's Anglican Church, Gonville, in Whanganui. Anashuya also worked as "inter-cultural communities enabler" for the New Zealand Church Missionary Society. Her appointment as assistant bishop of Wellington was announced in February 2024, and she was ordained as a bishop at Wellington Cathedral on 13 April 2024.

Anashuya relocated to Newtown in Wellington at the beginning of 2025.
