= Allen Johnston =

Archbishop of New Zealand

Allen Howard Johnston CMG (2 September 1912 – 22 February 2002) was a New Zealand Anglican bishop.

== Biography ==
Johnston was born in Auckland, New Zealand. He was educated at Seddon Memorial Technical College and St John's College, Auckland before beginning his ordained ministry with a curacy at St Mark's Remuera. He then had incumbencies at Dargaville, Northern Wairoa and Ōtāhuhu. In 1949 he became Archdeacon of Waimate, and Vicar of Whangārei, positions he held for four years before being appointed the Bishop of Dunedin. He was consecrated a bishop on 24 February 1953. He was translated to be Bishop of Waikato in 1969 and was additionally elected Archbishop of New Zealand in 1972. He served as a member of the Royal Commission to Inquire into and Report upon the Circumstances of the Convictions of Arthur Allan Thomas for the Murders of David Harvey Crewe and Jeanette Lenore Crewe.

== Honours and awards ==
In 1953, Johnston was awarded the Queen Elizabeth II Coronation Medal. In the 1978 New Year Honours, he was appointed a Companion of the Order of St Michael and St George.

Anglican Communion titles
Preceded by William Alfred Robertson Fitchett	Bishop of Dunedin; 1953–1969	Succeeded by Walter Wade Robinson
Preceded by John Tristram Holland	Bishop of Waikato; 1969–1980	Succeeded by Brian Davis
Preceded by Norman Alfred Lesser	Archbishop of New Zealand; 1972–1980	Succeeded by Paul Reeves
