= Eleanor Sanderson =

English Anglican bishop (born 1977)

The Right Reverend Eleanor Sanderson
- Bishop of Hull
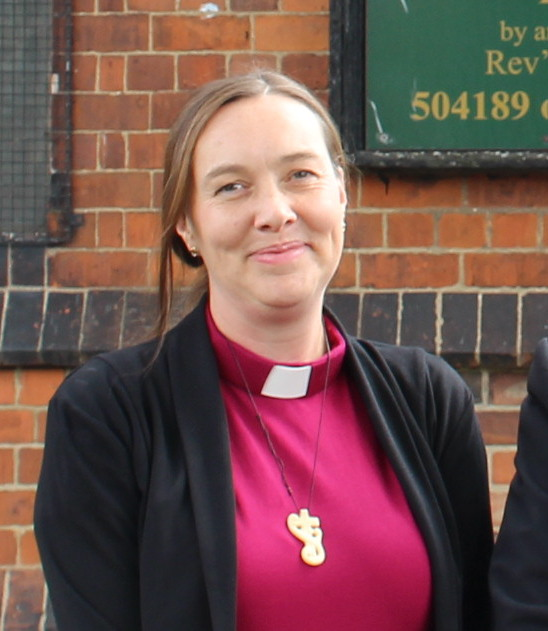
- Sanderson in 2022
- Church: Church of England
- Diocese: Diocese of York
- In office: September 2022 to present
- Other posts: Assistant bishop, Diocese of Wellington (2017–2022)

Orders
- Ordination: 2006
- Consecration: 2 June 2017 by Winston Halapua and Philip Richardson

Personal details
- Born: Eleanor Ruth Grourk; 1977 (age 48–49) England
- Denomination: Anglican
- Spouse: Tim Sanderson
- Children: 2

Academic background
- Education: Victoria University of Wellington
- Thesis: Within arm's reach: embodying geographies of development and spirituality (2006)

Eleanor Ruth Sanderson (née Grourk; born 1977) is an English Anglican bishop who has served as Bishop of Hull, a suffragan bishop in the Church of England Diocese of York, since 2022. She previously served as an assistant bishop in the Diocese of Wellington within the Anglican Church of Aotearoa, New Zealand and Polynesia. She became the first woman bishop in the Wellington diocese when she was consecrated on 2 June 2017. At the time, she was the fourth woman to be elevated to the position of bishop in the New Zealand Anglican church. Prior to becoming a bishop, she served as an Anglican priest for eleven years, also in the Wellington diocese.

== Early life and education ==
Eleanor Sanderson was born in England, and grew up in Derbyshire. She is the daughter of Terry Grourk. She attended Bristol University, where she graduated with a Bachelor of Science in geography. After having first visited New Zealand on a backpacking trip in 1996, she later returned to study geography at Victoria University of Wellington. She graduated with a Master of Development Studies with distinction in 2002, and a PhD in 2007. She also holds a Master in Theology degree, and was a fellow of public theology at Virginia Theological Seminary.

== Ordained ministry ==
Sanderson was ordained as a deacon in 2005 and as a priest in 2006. She was vicar of St Alban's Anglican Church in Eastbourne, New Zealand, and was chaplain at Wellesley College, a boys preparatory school which is affiliated with the Anglican Church. At Victoria University, she was a teaching associate for the School of Religious Studies.

=== Episcopal ministry ===
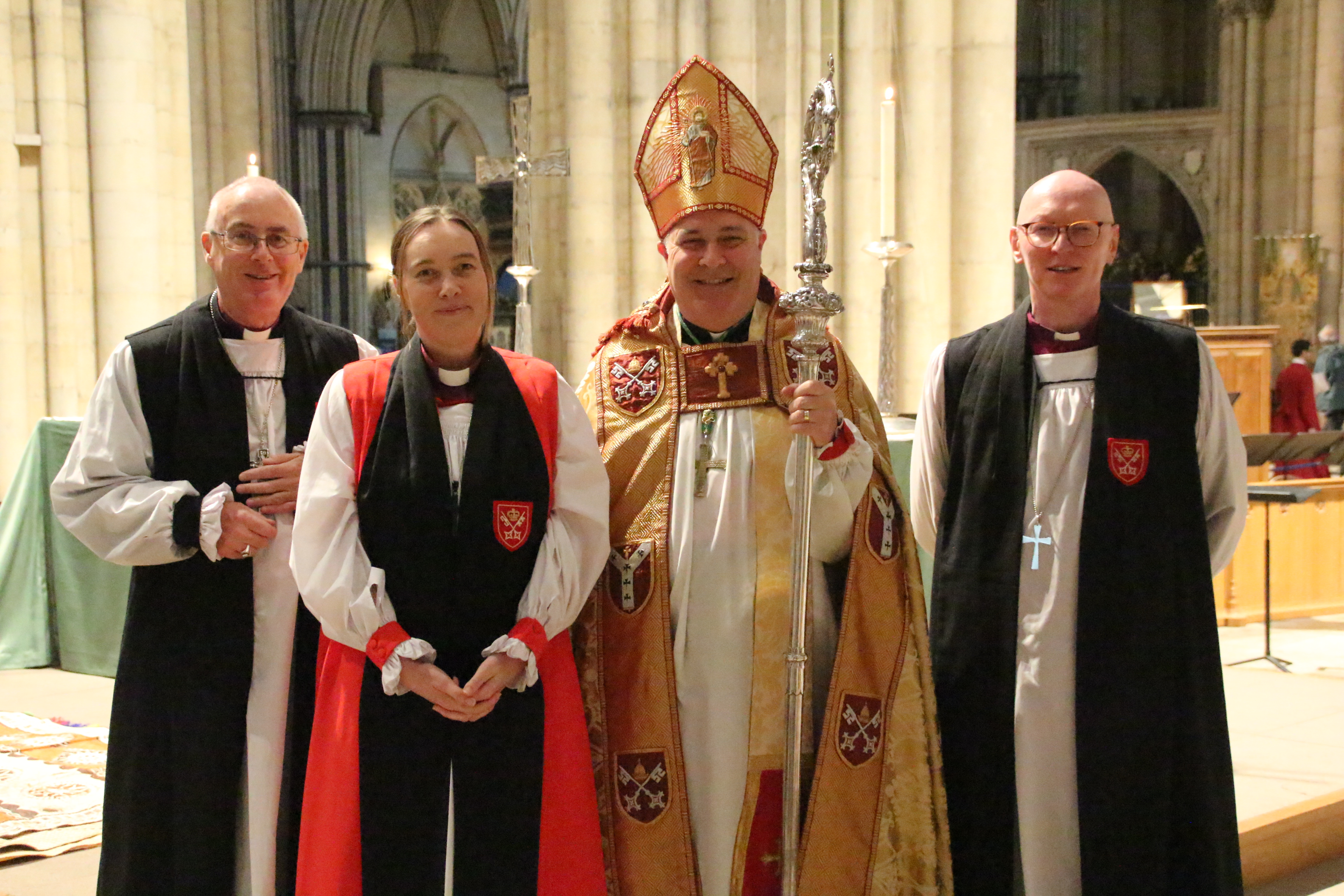
Sanderson (second from left) with other bishops of the Diocese of York, 2022

Sanderson was nominated for the position of assistant bishop on 11 May 2017, by the diocesan electoral college. She had already been appointed to a significant post within the diocese, as the diocesan canon theologian. Her nomination as bishop was later ratified by the General Synod and the House of Bishops. Sanderson was consecrated at the Cathedral of St Paul in Wellington on 2 June 2017, at a service led by Anglican archbishops Winston Halapua and Philip Richardson. As assistant bishop, Sanderson assisted the diocesan bishop; as of October 2021 that post was held by Justin Duckworth.

In 2017, Sanderson contributed to a special liturgy celebrating the fortieth anniversary of women's ordination in the Anglican Church of Aotearoa, New Zealand and Polynesia. The province first ordained women in 1977.

On 29 June 2022 she was announced as the next Bishop of Hull in the Diocese of York of the Church of England. She was officially welcomed into the diocese and commissioned as Bishop of Hull (i.e. translated) during a service at Hull Minster on 22 September 2022.

== Personal life ==
Sanderson is married and has two children.

== Selected works ==
- Walking with Angels. London: SPCK. 2026. ISBN 978-0281092079.

== See also ==
- Wai Quayle
- Ordination of women in the Anglican Communion
