= John Holland (bishop) =

John Tristram Holland CBE (31 January 1912 – 9 October 1990) was an Anglican bishop in New Zealand in the 20th century.

Holland was born into an ecclesiastical family, his father being St Barbe Holland, Bishop of Wellington and then Dean of Norwich.

John was educated at Durham School and University College, Oxford. Having trained at Westcott House, Cambridge, he was ordained deacon in 1935 and priest in 1936. His first post was as a curate at St Peter's Huddersfield. Following his father's appointment as Bishop of Wellington in 1936, he then moved to New Zealand and held incumbencies at Featherston, Upper Riccarton and New Plymouth before being appointed the Bishop of Waikato in 1951, a position he held for 18 years. He was consecrated a bishop on 1 May 1951. In 1969 he was translated to the Diocese of Polynesia. He retired in February 1975, and was appointed a Commander of the Order of the British Empire in the 1975 Queen's Birthday Honours.

Religious titles
Preceded by Cecil Cherrington	Bishop of Waikato; 1951–1968	Succeeded by Allen Johnston
Preceded by John Vockler	Bishop of Polynesia; 1969–1975	Succeeded by Jabez Bryce
