= Violet Bowring =

New Zealand artist

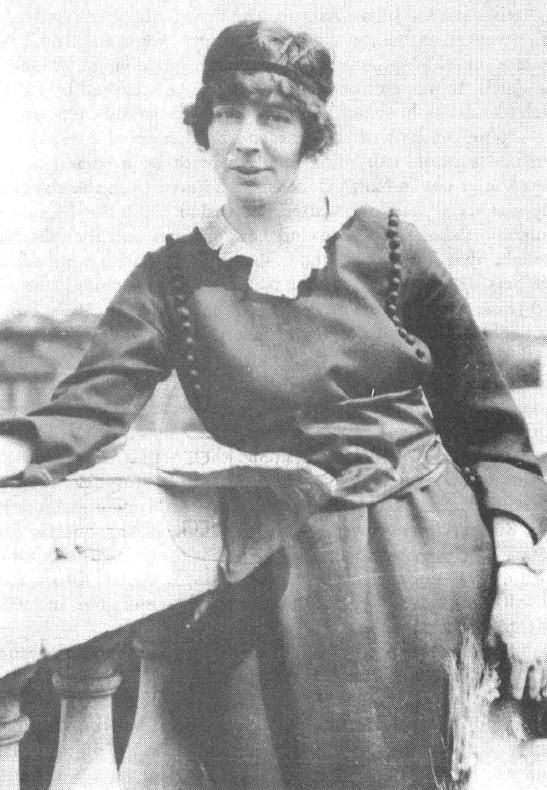
- Bowring, c. 1918
- Born: Violet Nelson; 29 August 1890; Christchurch, New Zealand
- Died: 21 January 1980 (aged 89); Townsville, Queensland, Australia
- Occupations: Painter; miniaturist
- Spouse: Walter Armiger Bowring (m. 1925; died 1931)

Violet Bowring (née Nelson; 29 August 1890 – 21 January 1980) was a New Zealand artist who exhibited widely in both New Zealand and Australia. She was versatile in many media, including pastels, oils, watercolours and pencil, a successful miniaturist and from an early age made and exhibited jewellery.

She is best known for her portrait of her one-time neighbour Banjo Paterson, now hanging in Sydney’s Australian Club, and used as the cover illustration of a book The Best of Banjo Paterson, compiled by Walter Stone, published in 1977.

== Early life ==
Violet Nelson was born in Christchurch on 29 August 1890, the second youngest child of Horatio and Ada Nelson. Horatio was founder of the successful nation-wide tea importing business Nelson Moate & Co. Ltd. Her siblings were Ida, Thomas Horatio, Jack, Norman and Royden Nelson.

== Career ==
The family moved to Wellington and Violet attended Pipitea Private School in Wellington and later the Technical College. She was successful in early competitions in freelance drawing and studied art under Maud Winifred Sherwood.

In 1915 and 1916 both she and the artist Walter Bowring (who she later married) contributed to the Countess of Liverpool's Gift Book, a collection of short stories, poems and essays on New Zealand's involvement in the First World War, including political cartoons and reproductions of work by New Zealand artists. In 1917, they also contributed to the NZ Freelance Christmas Annual, Described as "56 pages of lively, well-drawn cartoons, amusing stories and sparkling topical verse". They exhibited widely together at the New Zealand Academy of Fine Arts, Wellington, in Wanganui, the Canterbury Society of Arts and later together in Sydney. Nelson left New Zealand in 1920 to further her art studies at the Chelsea Art School and London School of Art. It was the London of Virginia Woolf, she recalled as "mad, crazy, happy days".

In April 1925 Nelson became Walter Bowring’s second wife. In May 1925 they moved to Sydney, the same year as he entered a portrait of her and his self-portrait in the Art Gallery's Archibald Prize. Violet Bowring joined the Society of Women Painters and the Women's Industrial Arts Society (a vice president in 1935) and was a regular exhibitor there and at the Royal Art Society. The couple became prominent in the Sydney art scene, exhibiting alongside the likes of Tom Roberts, Grace Cossington Smith and Thea Procter, Roland Wakelin, the latter Bowring's contemporary from the Wellington Technical School and both were students of Antonio Dattilo Rubbo. Walter Bowring died in Sydney aged 57 in 1931.

It was a time when New Zealand-born women artists like Bowring, her former tutor Maud Sherwood and Adele Younghusband were gaining popularity and Bowring's portraits were well received. The press noted many of "the outstanding Australian artists turned out to be New Zealanders, New Zealand only recognising talent after being provided in another country." During this time she had many commissions for portraits, especially of children, and of men leaving for active service in World War II. Her portrait of the daughter of the tobacco manufacturer, newspaper proprietor, parliamentarian and philanthropist, Hugh Denison (1865–1940) was the first four colour print reproduced on the cover of the Australian Women’s Day,1941.

Bowring moved to Townsville in 1950, taught art for a time and lived with a friend, Jessie MacQueen. Both wrote to the Townsville Bulletin deploring the lack of an Art Gallery. When the first Townsville Arts Society was formed in 1953, Bowring became a member of the provisional committee. Unfortunately, a large fire in Townsville in 1960 destroyed much of her work and more were damaged during Cyclone Althea in 1971.

Bowring died in Townsville on 21 January 1980 aged 89.
