= Tom Brown (bishop of Wellington) =

New Zealand Anglican bishop

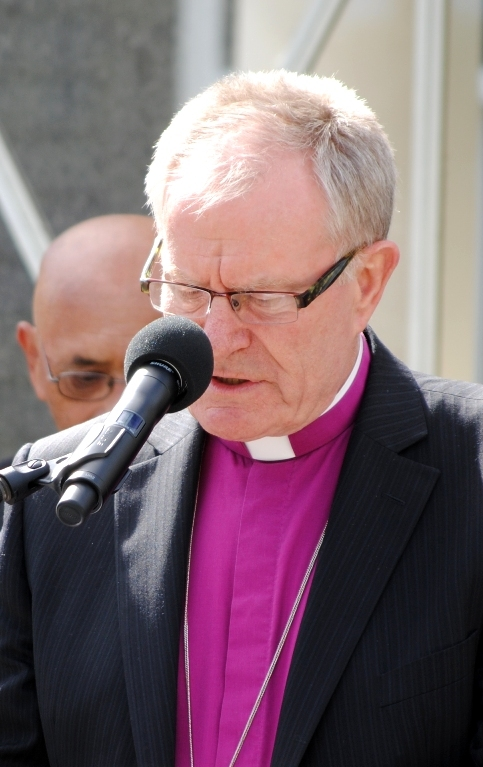
Brown in 2012

Thomas John Brown (born 16 August 1943) is a retired Anglican bishop in New Zealand. He is the former Bishop of Wellington.

On 29 July 2011, Brown announced, with the support of the Primate, that he would retire in March 2012, effectively completing his duties at the end of February 2012. He retired as Bishop of Wellington during an evening service on 26 February 2012, which had the Anglican Primate of Australia, who is also the Archbishop of Brisbane, in attendance along with Archbishop David Moxon, the Primate of New Zealand.

Brown was educated at the University of Otago in New Zealand and ordained in 1972. After curacies at St Matthew's in Christchurch, New Zealand, and St James the Greater, Leicester, England, he returned to New Zealand to become the vicar of Upper Clutha in 1976. After further incumbencies at Roslyn and Lower Hutt he became the Archdeacon of Belmont in 1987. In 1991 he became the assistant bishop and the vicar general in the Diocese of Wellington — he was consecrated a bishop on 23 February 1991 — and, seven years later, its diocesan bishop.

After his retirement, Brown voluntarily gave up his right to officiate as a priest after he split with his wife and then began a relationship with the chaplain of Samuel Marsden Collegiate School, Kate Carey-Smith, who was married to Chris Carey-Smith, the chaplain at St Mark's Church School, both being priests of the Anglican Diocese of Wellington. Brown said he surrendered his licence as a priest "to be loyal to the church and maintain the church's integrity".

Church of England titles
Preceded by Brian Davis	Bishop of Wellington; 1998-2012	Succeeded by Justin Duckworth
