= List of cathedrals in New Zealand =

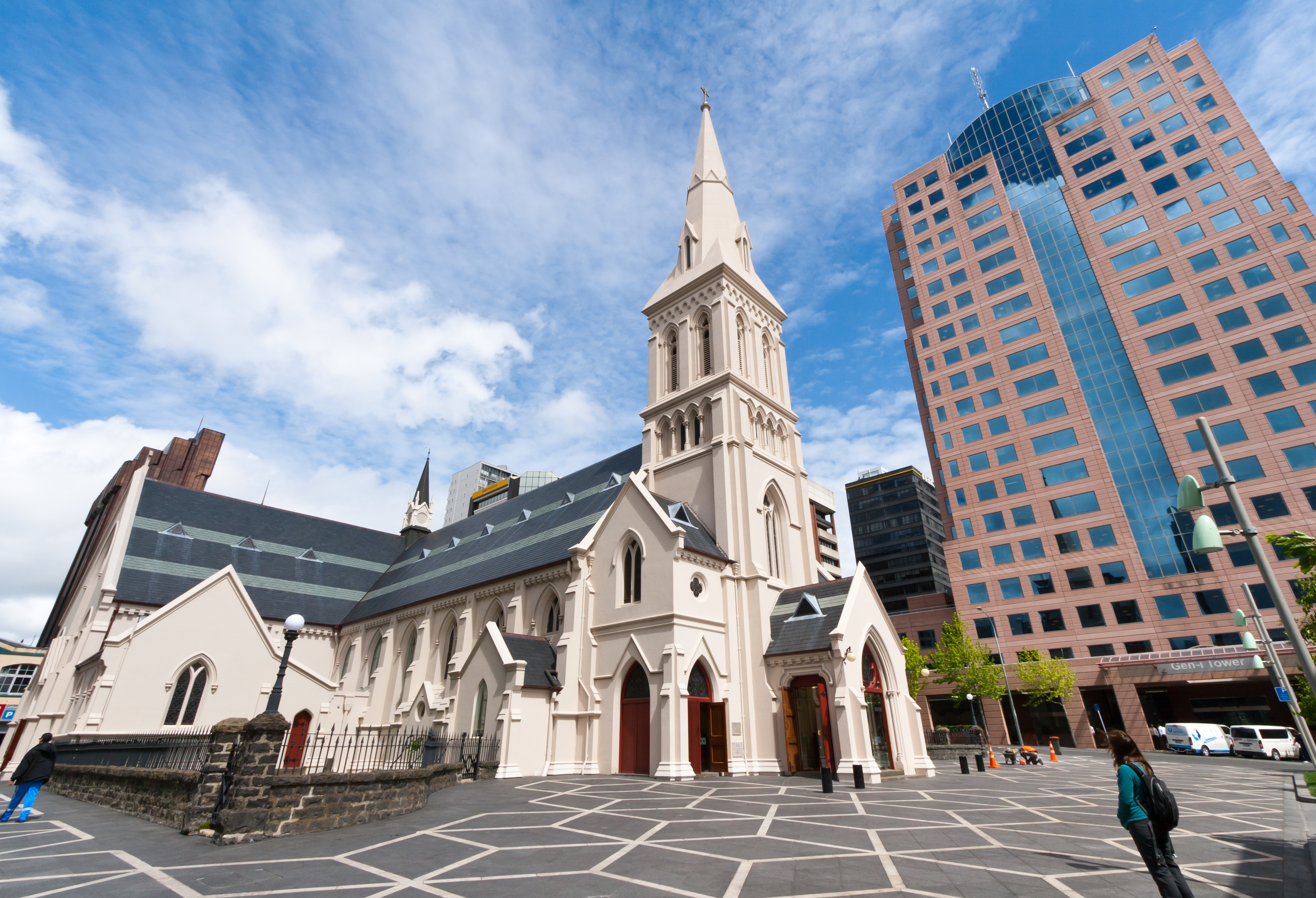
St Patrick's Cathedral in Auckland

St Joseph's Cathedral in Dunedin

This is a list of cathedrals in New Zealand sorted by denomination.

== Catholic ==
The following cathedrals of the Catholic Church in New Zealand (all of which are of the Latin Rite) are located in New Zealand:

- St Patrick's Cathedral in Auckland
- Cathedral of the Blessed Sacrament in Christchurch
- St Mary's Pro-Cathedral in Christchurch
- Cathedral of the Blessed Virgin Mary, Hamilton
- Cathedral of the Holy Spirit, Palmerston North
- St Joseph's Cathedral in Dunedin
- Metropolitan Cathedral of the Sacred Heart in Wellington

== Eastern Orthodox ==
The following cathedrals of the Greek Orthodox Holy Metropolis of New Zealand:

- Cathedral of the Annunciation of the Virgin Mary, Wellington

== Anglican ==
The following cathedrals of the Anglican Church in Aotearoa, New Zealand and Polynesia are located in New Zealand:

- Cathedral of the Holy Trinity in Auckland
- St Peter's Cathedral in Hamilton
- The Taranaki Cathedral, the Church of St Mary in New Plymouth
- Waiapu Cathedral of Saint John the Evangelist, Napier in Napier
- Wellington Cathedral of St Paul in Wellington
- Christ Church Cathedral in Nelson
- ChristChurch Cathedral in Christchurch
- Transitional Anglican Cathedral in Christchurch
- St Paul's Cathedral in Dunedin.

== See also ==
- List of cathedrals
