= St Alban's Church, Eastbourne =

Anglican parish church in New Zealand

St Alban's Church
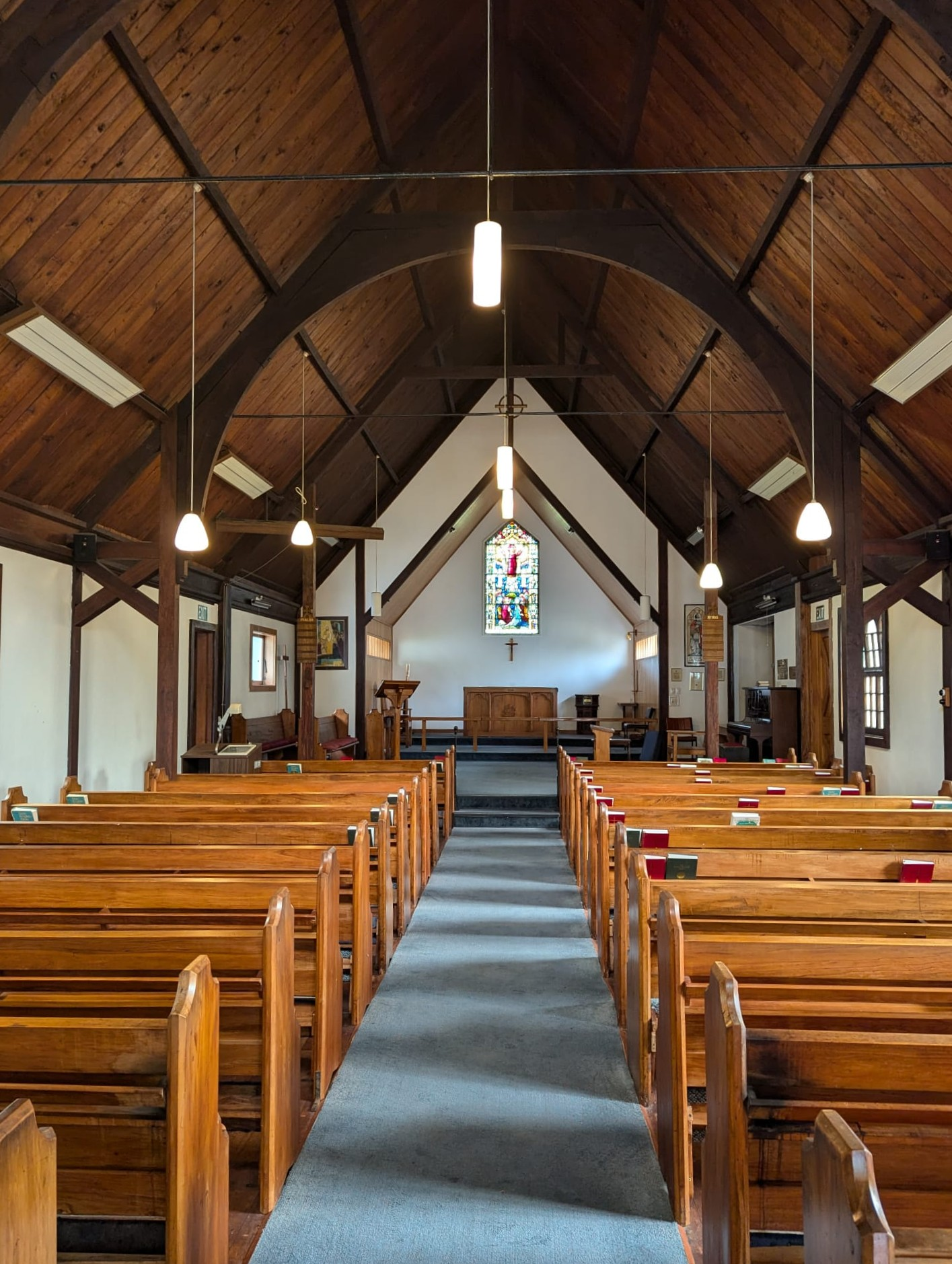
- Interior of St Alban's in 2024
- St Alban's Church
- 41°17′48.86″S 174°53′41.18″E
- Location: 11 Ngaio Street, Eastbourne
- Country: New Zealand
- Denomination: Anglican
- Website: stalbanschurch.nz

History
- Dedicated: May 1910
- Consecrated: 1936

Architecture
- Architect: Frederick de Jersey Clere
- Architectural type: Church
- Style: Gothic Revival
- Years built: 1910

Administration
- Province: Anglican Church in Aotearoa, New Zealand and Polynesia
- Diocese: Wellington

St Alban's Church is a historic Anglican parish church belonging to the Anglican Church in Aotearoa, New Zealand and Polynesia. It is located in the Lower Hutt suburb of Eastbourne, on the east coast of Wellington Harbour in New Zealand.

The church is the oldest in Eastbourne having been designed by the then Diocesan architect of Wellington, Frederick de Jersey Clere, and completed in 1910. Following assessments after the 2016 Kaikōura earthquake, the church building along with its accompanying parish hall were closed after failing to meet the required earthquake building standards. This saw the parish move its services to the hall of the nearby Wellesley College in Days Bay.

The church is dedicated to Saint Alban, the first Christian martyr of Great Britain.

== History ==
The very first Anglican service to be held in Eastbourne is believed to have taken place in a disused in store in June 1902. Before the community in Eastbourne received their own church and vicar, the Vicar of St James Church in Lower Hutt, The Reverend Joshua Jones, would travel to on horseback to the Eastern Bays to conduct occasional services.

The land on which St Alban's Church is built, located at the end of Ngaio Street, was purchased in 1908. Its design was produced by the distinguished Wellington architect, Frederick de Jersey Clere, who is also responsible for other significant church buildings in the region, such as St Mary of the Angels and St Andrew's on The Terrace, both of which are located in Wellington. The church was completed and dedicated in May 1910. Its first vicar was The Reverend Ernest I. Sola, who served the parish until 1917.

In 1927 the parish hall was built and in 1936 St Alban's Church was formally consecrated.

== Vicars ==
- 1911: Ernest I. Sola
- 1917: Oswald Stent
- 1927: Herbert Goertz
- 1929: William Raine
- 1934: Charles Kreeft
- 1946: Paul Stanley
- 1951: Ian McCaul
- 1956: Edward Giles
- 1965: John Malcolm
- 1971: Peter Stuart
- 1982: Terry Molloy
- 1989: Colin Wright
- 2002: Damon Plimmer
- 2013: Eleanor Sanderson
- 2018: John Hughes
- 2022: -vacant
- 2024: Sue Brown

== Notable Vicars ==
From 2002 to 2012 The Venerable Damon Plimmer would serve as the Vicar of St Alban's. Subsequently, he serves as the Archdeacon of Central Otago in the Diocese of Dunedin on the South Island.

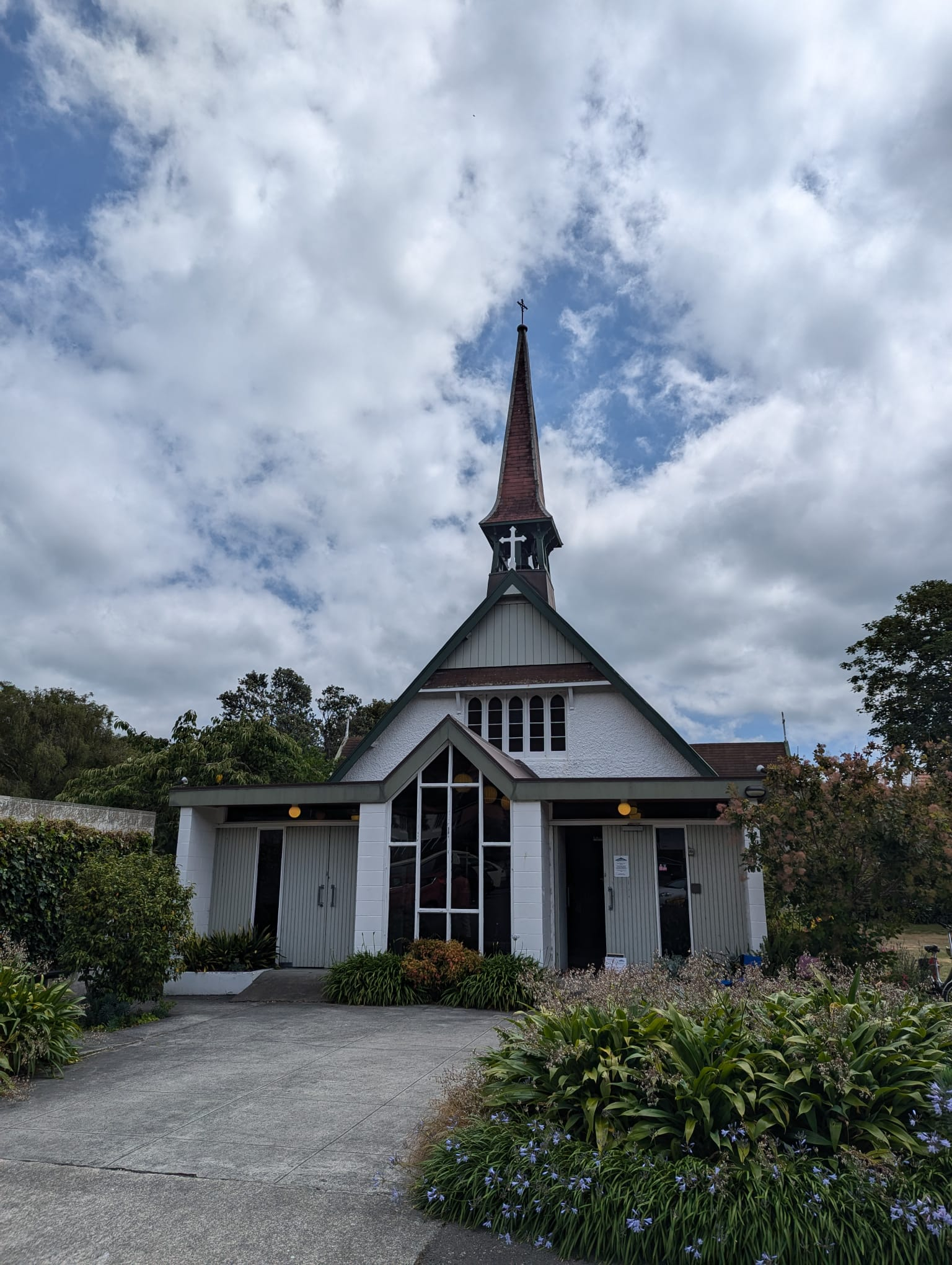
The front of the church in 2024

From 2013, The Right Reverend Dr Eleanor Sanderson served as Vicar of St Alban's, prior to being elected assistant bishop in the Diocese of Wellington in 2017. Sanderson was the first woman to be elected to the office of bishop within the diocese. In June 2022, Sanderson was announced as the next Bishop of Hull in the Diocese of York of the Church of England.
