= St Peter's Cathedral, Hamilton =

St Peter's Cathedral
- The Waikato Cathedral Church of St Peter
- Māori: Te whare karakia matua o Pita Tapu ki Waikato
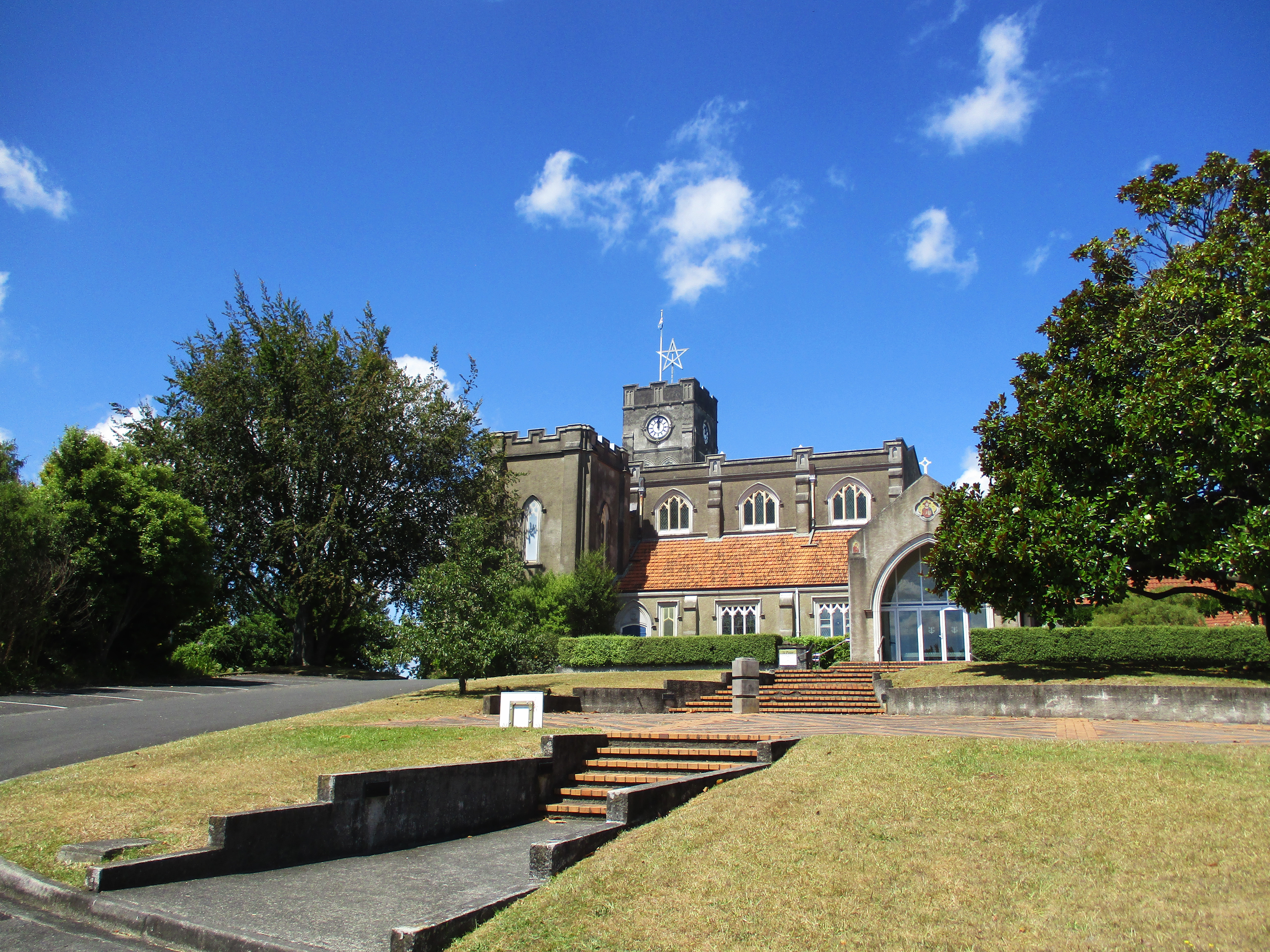
- St Peter's Cathedral, Hamilton
- St Peter's Cathedral
- 37°47′32.54″S 175°17′10.86″E
- Address: Victoria Street, Hamilton, Waikato, North Island
- Country: New Zealand
- Denomination: Anglican
- Website: www.stpeter.org.nz

History
- Status: Cathedral
- Dedication: Peter the Apostle

Architecture
- Functional status: Active
- Architect(s): Warren and Blechynden
- Architectural type: Church
- Completed: 1916

Administration
- Province: Anglican Church in Aotearoa, New Zealand and Polynesia
- Diocese: Waikato and Taranaki

Clergy
- Bishop: Philip Richardson
- Dean: Julian Perkins

Heritage New Zealand – Category 2
- Designated: 5 September 1985
- Reference no.: 4206

St Peter's Cathedral is an Anglican cathedral church in Hamilton, located in the Waikato region of the North Island of New Zealand. It is located on a small hill, known as Cathedral Hill (Māori: Pukerangiora), in the southern central part of the city off Victoria Street.

== Overview ==
St Peter's Cathedral serves as the seat for the Bishop and Diocese of Waikato, the surrounding region. The Diocese is one of seven dioceses in Aotearoa, forming part of the Anglican Communion around the world. The choir is a mixed-voice choir consisting of 24 singers.

Close by to the north of the cathedral on the other side of the street is Waikato Museum. On the opposite side of the Waikato River over the Victoria Bridge is the Roman Catholic cathedral, the Cathedral of the Blessed Virgin Mary, Hamilton.

The senior priest of the cathedral is called a Dean, currently The Very Rev'd Julian Perkins.

== History ==
The first Anglican church was built in Hamilton and was almost completed in 1867, but burnt down in that year. A second church was built in 1871 but was considered unsatisfactory. On land at the base of the current cathedral site, a third church was dedicated in 1884 and consecrated in 1887. The present St Peter's Cathedral, the fourth Anglican church in the succession of buildings, was completed in 1916. It was modelled on a 15th-century church in Norfolk, England. The building was designed in ferro-concrete by Warren and Blechynden of Hamilton and was the third on this site.

The eight bells of the cathedral were cast by the Mears & Stainbank foundry of Whitechapel, London. The tenor bell (the bell with the lowest pitch) was purchased in 1931 and installed in 1933. The remaining six bells were added in October 1948 after fund-raising. Ringing is undertaken by members of The Australian and New Zealand Association of Bellringers.

St Peter's Cathedral was registered by the New Zealand Historic Places Trust (now Heritage New Zealand) as a Category II historic building on 5 September 1985 with registration number 4206.

=== 21st century ===
The cathedral hosted a meeting for the Hamilton mayoral election, 2016. A multi-coloured light show at the cathedral was planned for December 2016.

== See also ==
- List of cathedrals in New Zealand
