= Taranaki Cathedral =

Historic church in New Plymouth, New Zealand

- The Taranaki Cathedral Church of St Mary
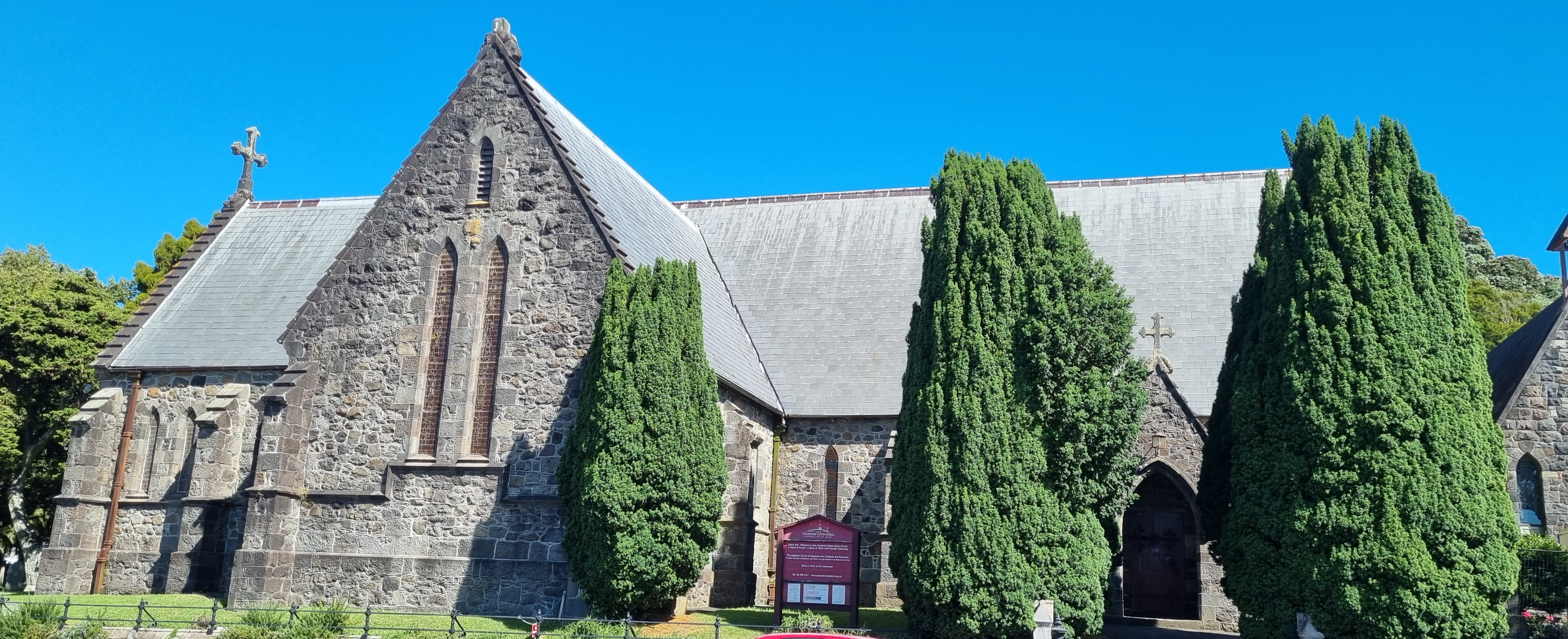
- Taranaki Cathedral Church of St Mary
- Taranaki Cathedral
- 39°03′37″S 174°04′23″E
- Address: 37 Vivian Street, Robe Street and Brougham Street, New Plymouth
- Country: New Zealand
- Denomination: Anglican
- Website: taranakicathedral.org.nz

History
- Former name: St Mary's Church (1842 – 2010)
- Status: Cathedral (since 2010); Church (1842 – 2010)
- Founder: George Selwyn
- Consecrated: 6 March 2010 (as a cathedral)
- Events: 2011 Christchurch earthquake

Architecture
- Functional status: Closed for repairs (2016)
- Architects: Frederick Thatcher; John Francis Messenger
- Architectural type: Church
- Style: Gothic Revival
- Years built: 1845–1846
- Closed: 2016

Specifications
- Materials: Stone

Administration
- Province: Anglican Church in Aotearoa
- Diocese: Waikato and Taranaki

Clergy
- Bishop: Philip Richardson
- Dean: Jay Ruka

Heritage New Zealand – Category 1
- Designated: 28 June 1984
- Reference no.: 148

The Taranaki Cathedral Church of St Mary (formerly known as St Mary's Church) is a historic Anglican cathedral church, located at 37 Vivian Street, New Plymouth, in New Zealand.

The cathedral is the oldest stone church in New Zealand and is listed by Heritage New Zealand (formerly New Zealand Historic Places Trust) as a Category 1 Historic Place. At the same time, it is one of the newest cathedrals in the Anglican Communion. The cathedral serves as the seat of the Bishop of Waikato and Taranaki, the Most Reverend Philip Richardson.

The church, with the original part built between 1845 and 1846 in the Gothic Revival style, was designed by Frederick Thatcher, a London-trained architect, one of the first settlers arriving in New Plymouth. Following the 2011 Christchurch earthquake and a Detailed Seismic Assessment undertaken in 2014, the cathedral was closed for repairs in February 2016.

== History ==
New Plymouth was chosen as the site for New Zealand’s second European colony, with settlers arriving from 1841 onwards. The beginnings of Christianity in the area came as a result of the need to provide the familiar spiritual and cultural institutions of home to the settlers, as well as missionary services to the Maori population. As the majority of colonists were members of the Church of England, the Church Mission Society was able to seek the appointment of a Bishop for New Zealand, tasked with setting up the Anglican constitution in the new Diocese of New Zealand. Initially, the diocese included the whole country as well as islands from Polynesia.

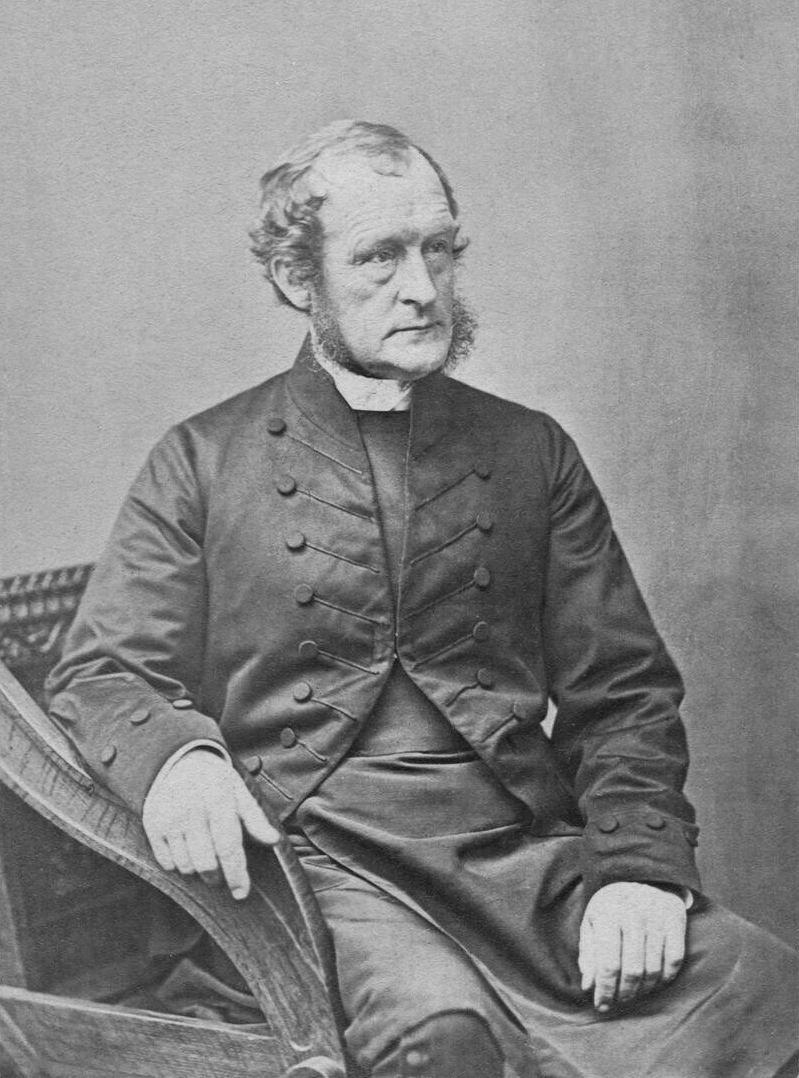
Bishop George Selwyn

In 1841 George Augustus Selwyn was appointed the Bishop of New Zealand. He arrived in New Zealand in 1842 and began his work.

After visiting New Plymouth in October 1842, Bishop Selwyn began to organize the construction of churches in this new parish. He appointed the reverend William Bolland as Deacon for the parish of New Plymouth, allocating an existing sandstone house at Te Henui as residence for him and his family.

He also got in touch with Frederick Thatcher, a London-trained architect, associate of the Royal Institute of British Architects, who arrived in New Plymouth in 1843. He was a key figure in the development of New Zealand’s Gothic Revival vernacular churches.

With the funding provided by the Bishop Selwyn, reverend Bolland along with architect Frederick Thatcher began the building process of two new churches, St Mary’s Church in central New Plymouth, and the Holy Trinity Church at Henui, now in Fitzroy.

The foundation stone for St Mary's was laid on 23 March 1845. The stone masons Thomas Rusden, Harry Hooker, and Phillip Moon built the church in eighteen months, using stones hauled from the beach. George Robinson, the chief builder, was the one responsible for the beautiful rimu (red pine) roof.

St Mary's is one of the earliest stone churches in New Zealand, with the original part of it built between 1845 and 1846 in the Gothic Revival style. This original part, approximately 15m by 9m, designed by Thatcher according to ideas supplied by Bishop Selwyn, has plain rubble walls, exposed timber beams, a steep-sloped Rimu roof and tall, narrow windows with pointed arches at the top.

Other than a place for worship, during the First and Second Taranaki Wars, St Mary’s also became a religious redoubt, with the churchyard used as a bullock yard for transport teams. The church even housed for a time a compartment for the storage of ammunition and explosives. A company occupied the west area, where church extensions were being carried out. These extensions included then new holes for muskets. A naval force was posted inside the church when it was thought that the town might be under siege, and, at several times, women and children congregated inside the church for safety.

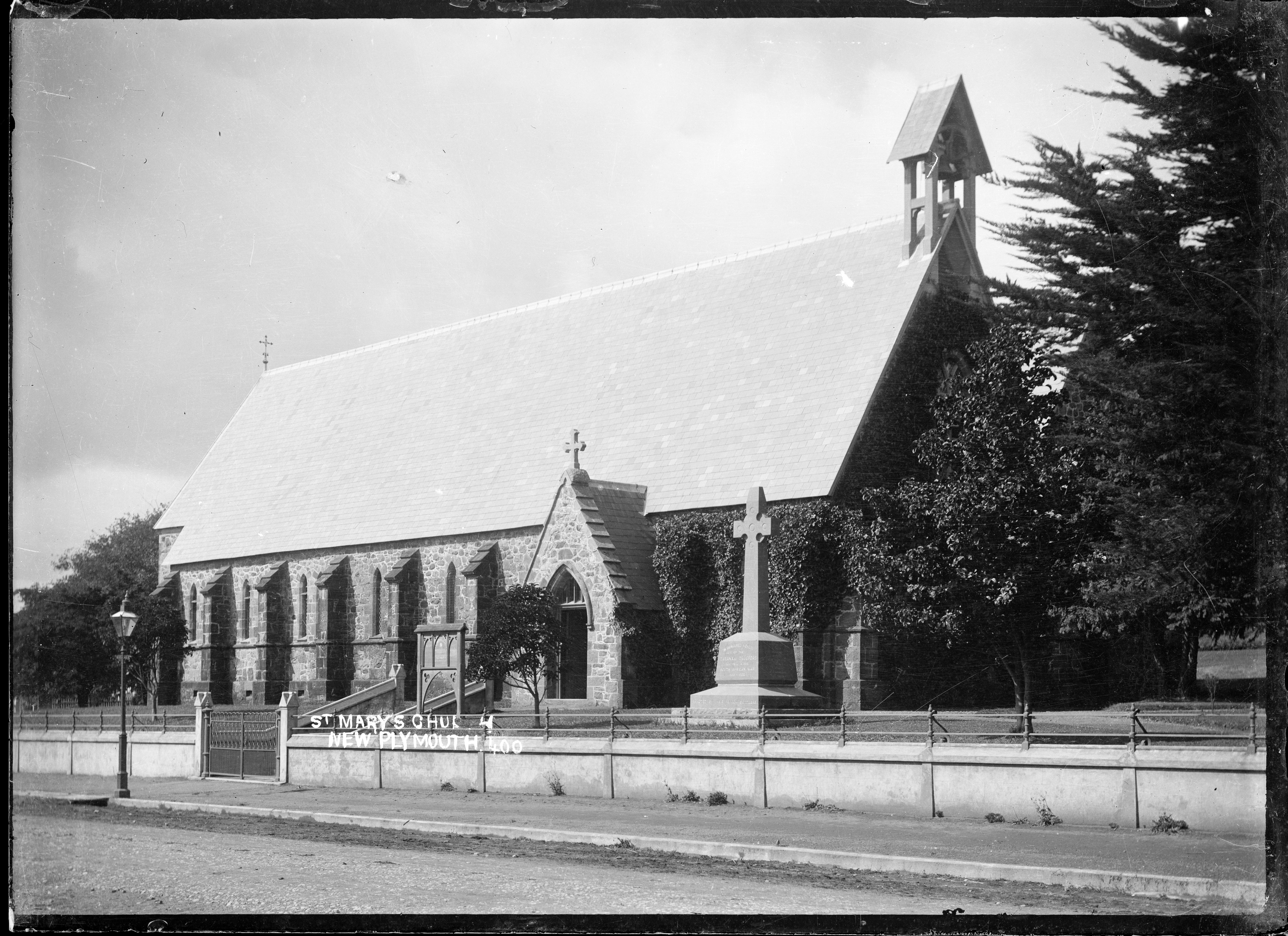
St Mary’s Church (ca.1910)

The church has been very considerably enlarged and modified, with the new various sections blending into a harmonious whole. The first extensions to St Mary's were made during the war years. In 1859 the church was lengthen and a veranda was added. Unfortunately, due to many interruptions caused by the fighting, this extension was not completed until 1862. In 1864, two years later, parallel to the existing building, it was added another aisle, designed by George Robinson, the chief builder of the original part of the church.

Further enlargements were made in 1893 to the chancel, apse, sanctuary and organ chamber by Benjamin W. Mountfort, a well-known church architect. In 1915 it was added the side chapel of All Saints, designed by Frank Messenger, a local architect. At the same time the northern transept was enlarged as a memorial to Archdeacon Govett, under construction professionals George Edmund Tole and Horace Lovell Massey.

St Mary's was a parish church from 1842 to 2010 and it was consecrated as a cathedral in the Diocese of Waikato and Taranaki on 6 March that year. On 28 June 1984, the building was registered as a Category 1 heritage structure by the New Zealand Historic Places Trust (now Heritage New Zealand), with registration number 148.

The cathedral is a member of the Community of the Cross of Nails and is a centre for Peace and Reconciliation.

In February 2016, after a structural assessment following the 2011 Christchurch earthquake, the Cathedral was closed. Sunday services continued in the Peace Hall across the road.

The adjoining cemetery surrounding the church contains the graves of Reverend William Bolland, who opened the church, the Reverend Henry Govett, the second vicar, Captain Henry King, Resident Magistrate and other notable historic figures, as well as a number of significant trees.

Close to the entrance to the cathedral there is a memorial, the Taranaki South African War troopers' memorial. It was designed by Archdeacon Walsh of Waimate North as a Celtic Cross and was unveiled to the public during a ceremony held on 27 August 1903.

== Image gallery ==
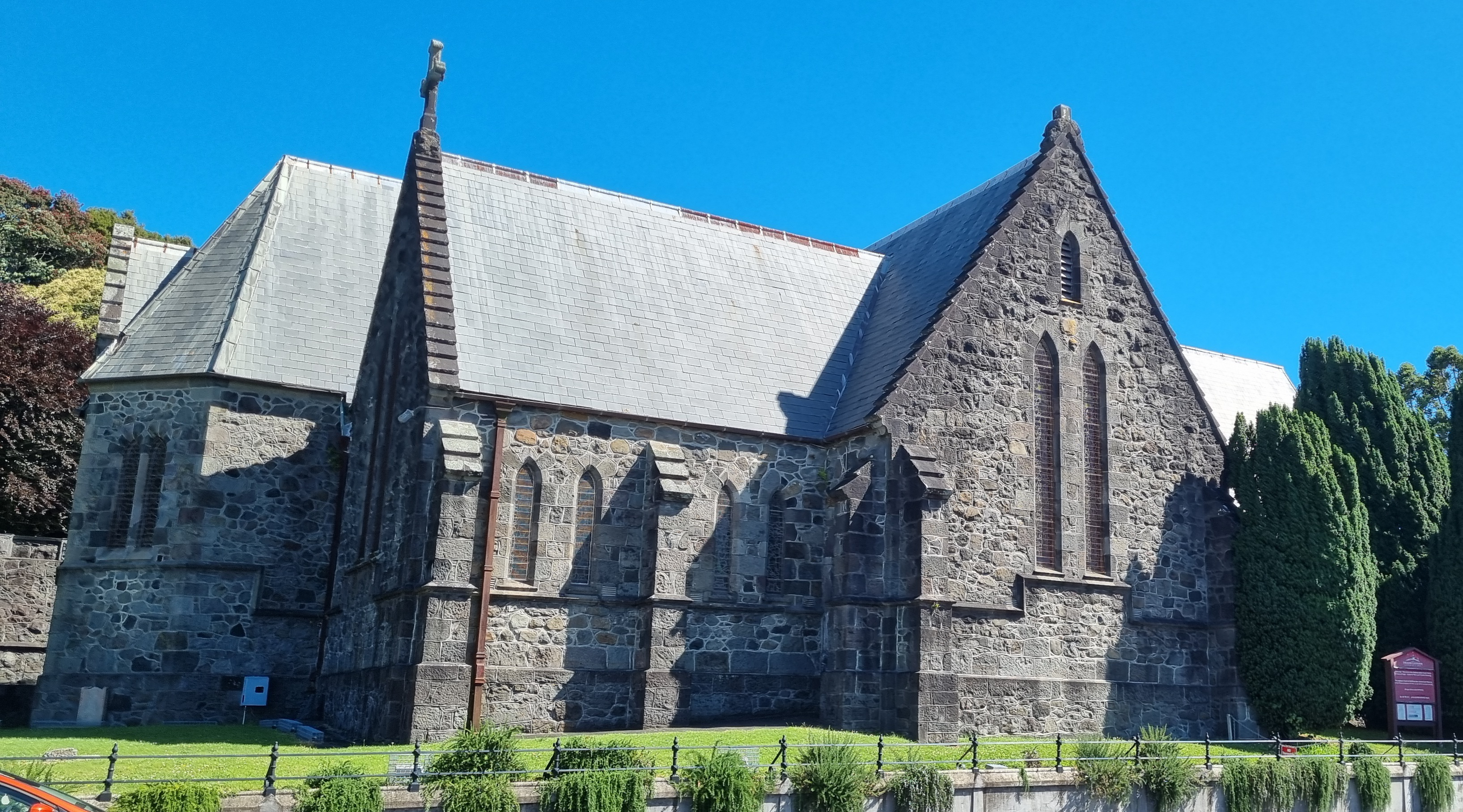
St Mary’s Church
North side

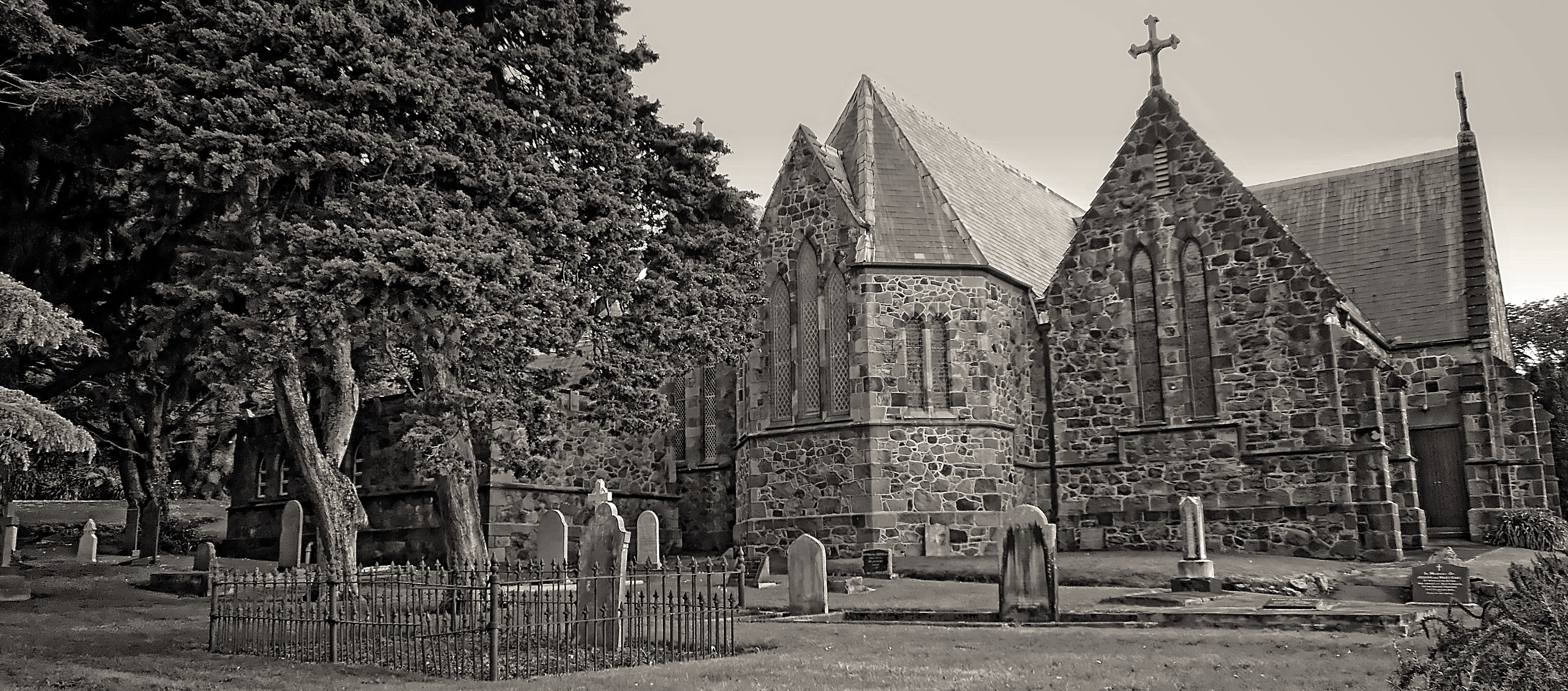
St Mary’s Church
East side

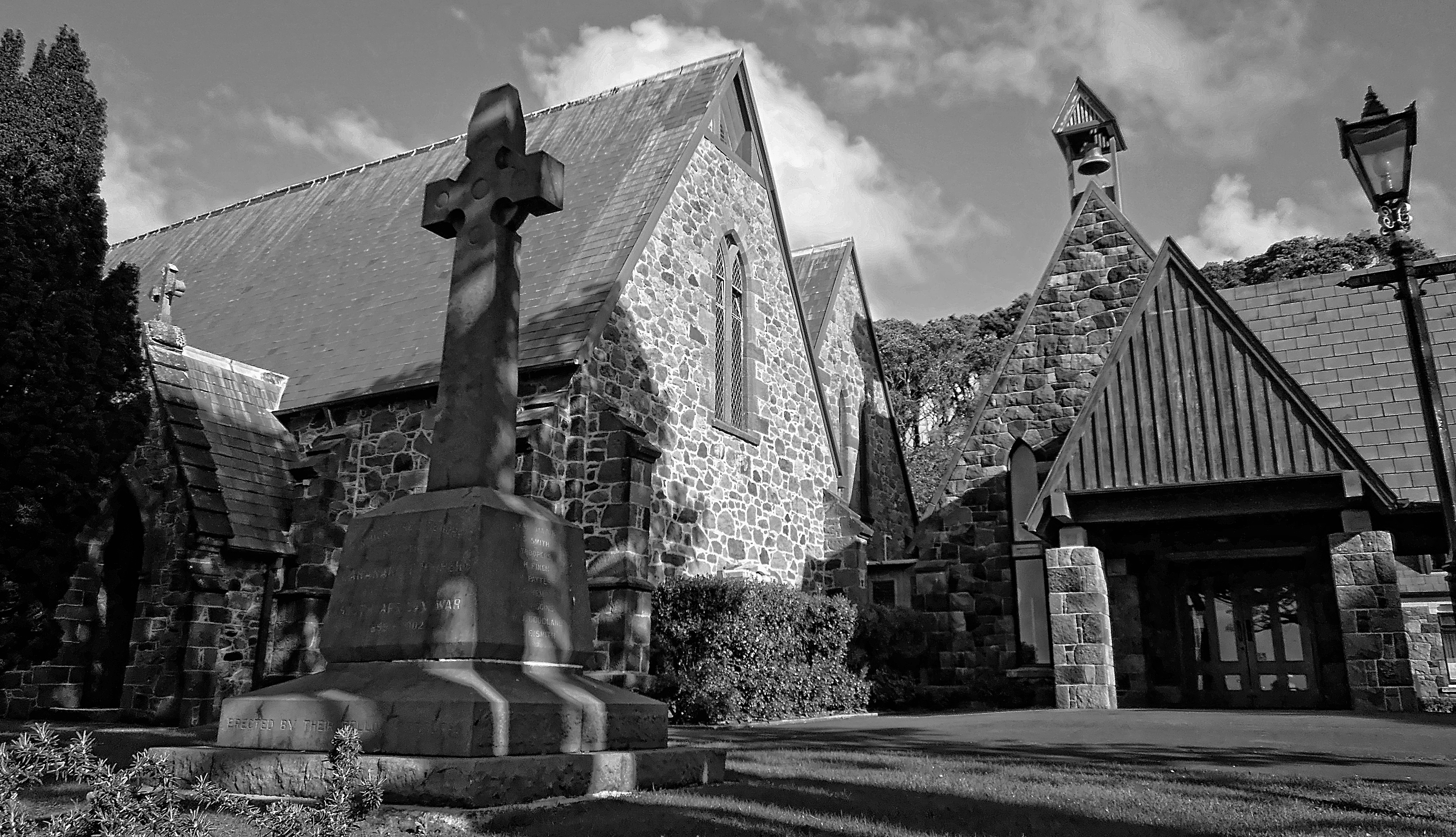
St Mary’s Church

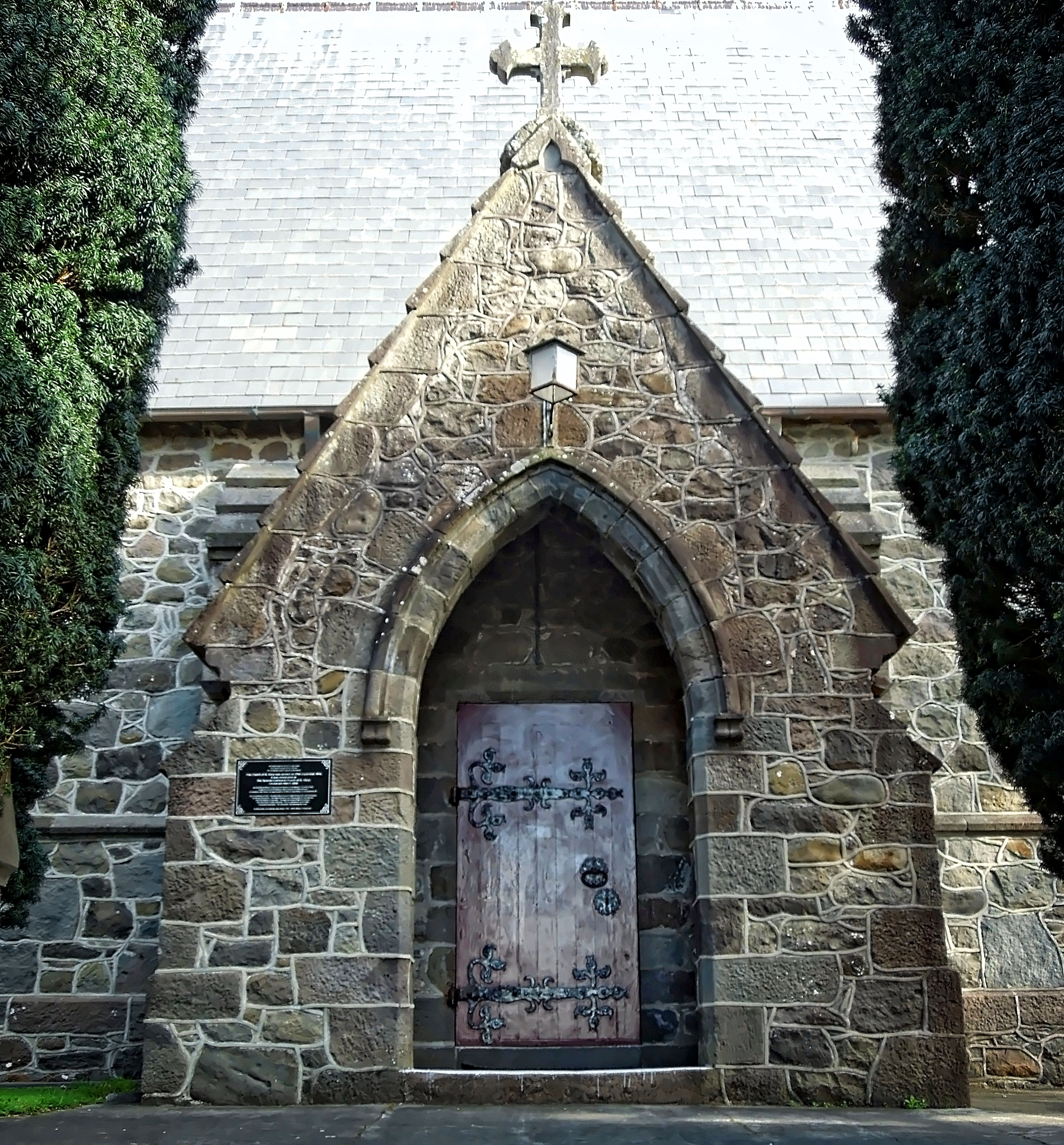
St Mary’s Church
- the entrance

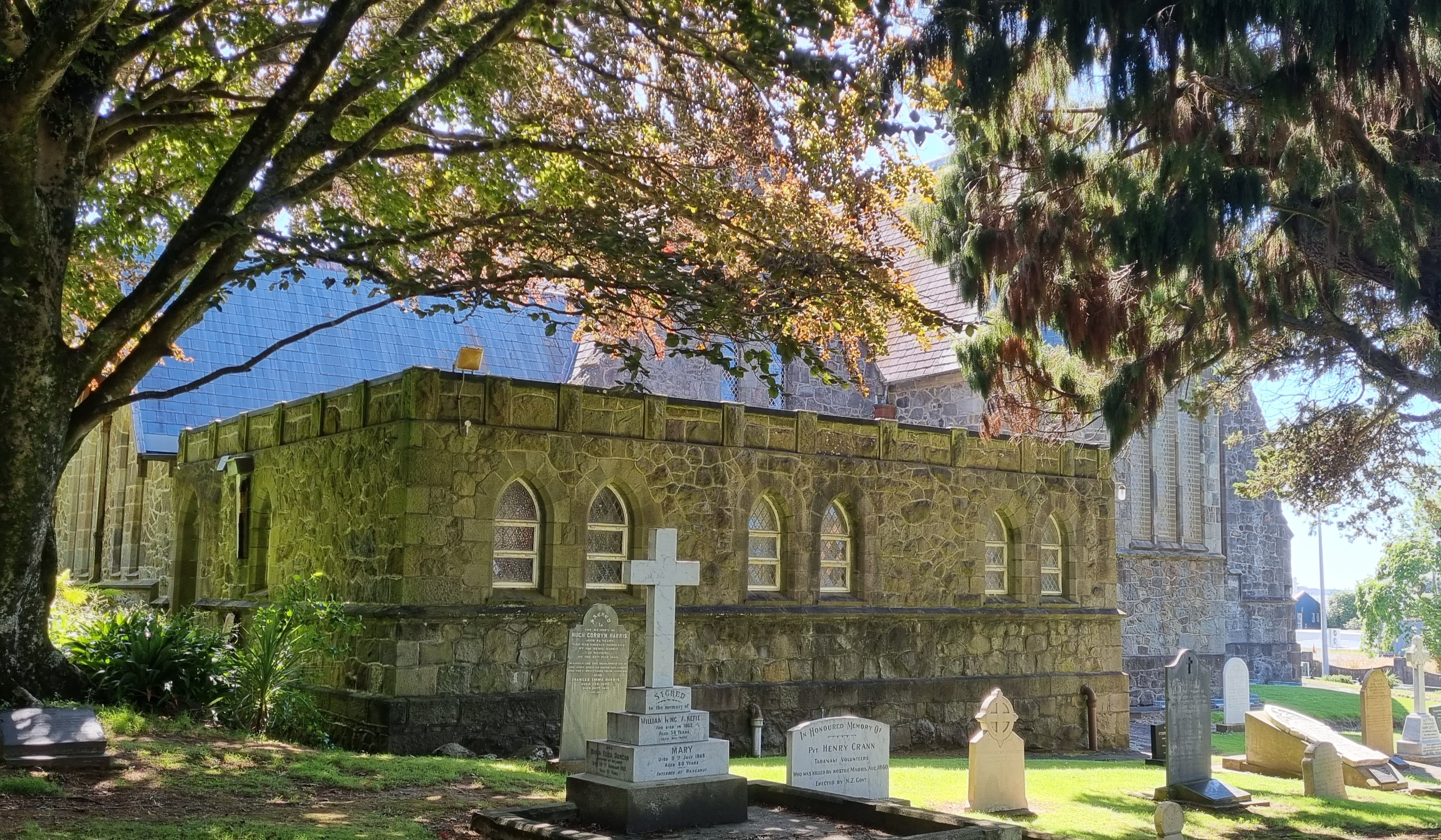
St Mary’s Church graveyard

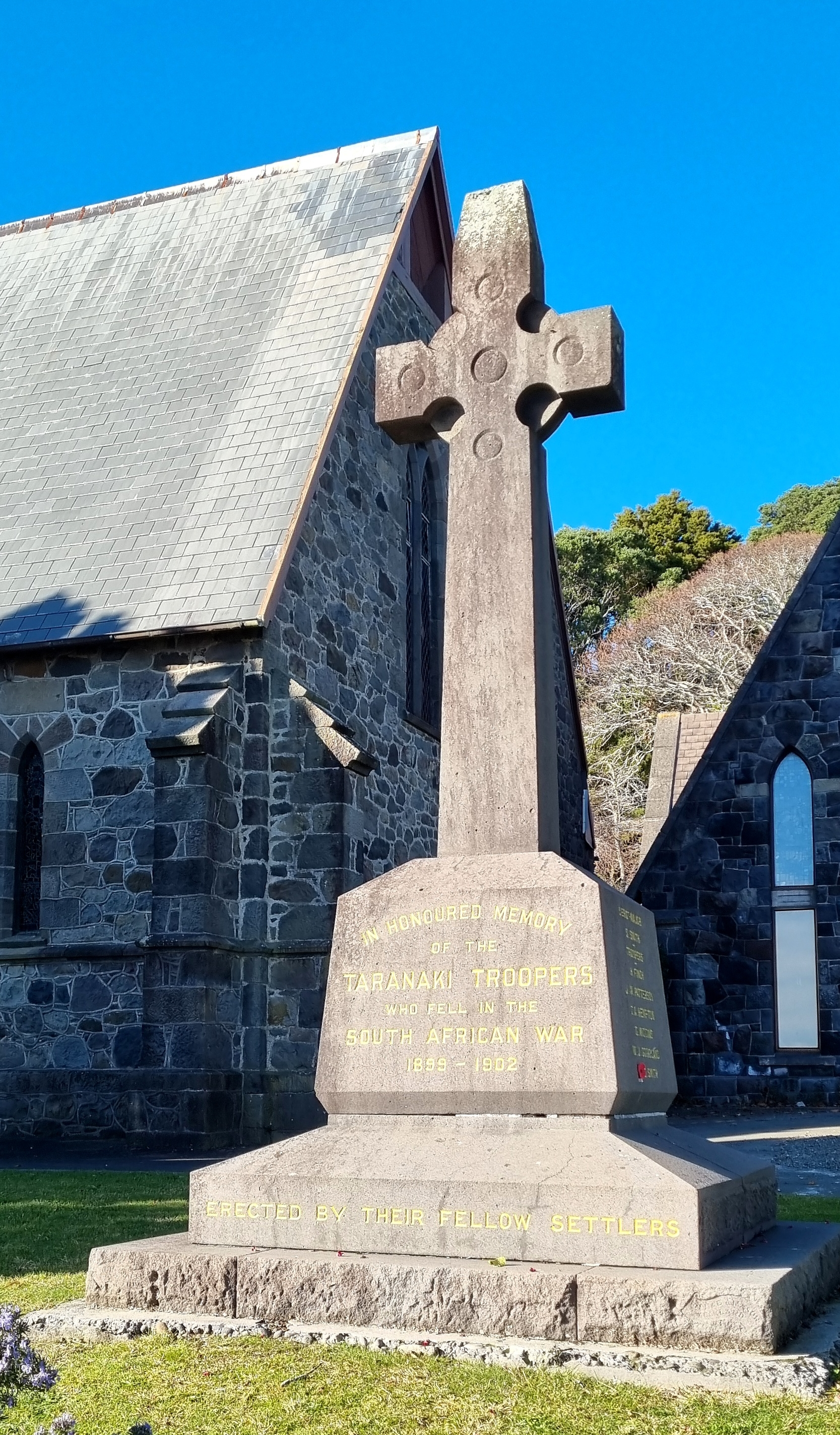
South African War troopers' memorial

== List of deans ==
The Dean is the head of the chapter of canons and is one of the senior priests of the diocese.

- 2010–2016: Jamie Allen
- 2016–2018: Peter Beck
- 2018: Ross Falconer
- 2018–2020: Trevor Harrison
- 2020–2021: Jacqui Patterson and Jay Ruka
- 2022–present: Jay Ruka

== Bibliography ==
- Taranaki Cathedral Church of St Mary (Anglican), Heritage New Zealand, New Zealand Heritage List
- Porter, Frances; Historic Buildings of New Zealand: North Island, New Zealand Historic Places Trust, Auckland, N.Z., Methuen, 1983, ISBN 0456031103
