= Damon Plimmer =

Damon Plimmer is an Anglican priest. He is the Archdeacon of Central Otago, one of four Archdeaconries in the Anglican Diocese of Dunedin which serves a portion of New Zealand's South Island.

He was a priest at Wellington Cathedral and later the Vicar of St Alban's Church, Eastbourne then Upper Clutha. He was collated on 28 October 2015.
