= Bruce Hamilton (cricketer) =

New Zealand cricketer and schoolteacher (1932–2020)

Personal information
- Full name: Bruce Glanville Hamilton
- Born: 22 October 1932; Wanganui, New Zealand
- Died: 8 May 2020 (aged 87); Lower Hutt, New Zealand
- Role: Batsman

Domestic team information
- Years: Team
- 1953/54: Central Districts
- Source: Cricinfo, 29 October 2020

Bruce Hamilton (22 October 1932 – 8 May 2020) was a New Zealand cricketer and schoolteacher.

== Life and career ==
Hamilton was born in Wanganui in October 1932, one of identical twins. He attended Wanganui Collegiate School and the University of New Zealand in Christchurch, where he earned an MA (Hons) in English. He then taught at Sydney Church of England Grammar School and at St John's School, Leatherhead, in Surrey, before joining his twin brother Don on the staff of Christ's College, Christchurch. In 1964 he became the inaugural deputy headmaster at the new Rathkeale College in Masterton. He remained there for the rest of his career, retiring in 1991.

He played in one first-class match for Central Districts in 1953-54. In this match, although he made only five runs batting at No. 4, Central Districts beat Canterbury by five wickets to win their first ever Plunket Shield title. He played Hawke Cup cricket for Wanganui during the period when they held the trophy from January 1953 to December 1955.

== Books ==
Hamilton wrote six histories of New Zealand schools. In two of them his co-author was his twin brother Don:

- Rathkeale: Rathkeale College History and Register, 1964–1988 (1989)
- O Floreat Semper: The History of King's College, 1896–1995 (1995)
- Palmerston North Boys' High School, 1902–2001 (2001)
- Never a Footstep Back: A History of the Wanganui Collegiate School, 1854–2003 (2003, with Don Hamilton)
- A Venture in Faith: The history of St Paul's Collegiate School, 1959–2008 (2008)
- The Owl Spreads Its Wings: The History of St Peter's School, 1936–2010 (2011, with Don Hamilton)
