= Walter Armiger Bowring =

New Zealand artist, cartoonist and illustrator

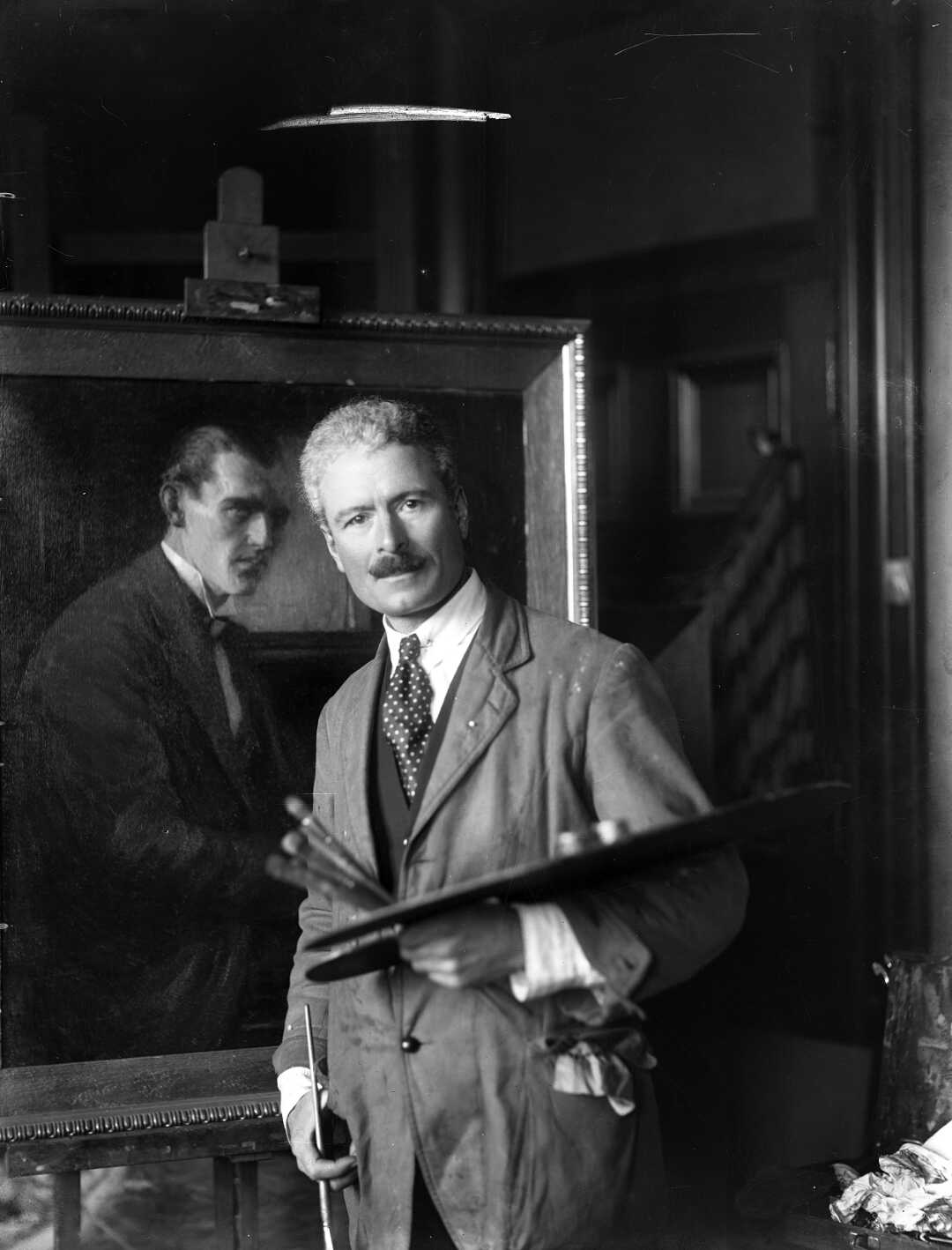
- Bowring, c. 1920
- Born: 11 March 1874; Auckland, New Zealand
- Died: 3 November 1931 (aged 57); Sydney, Australia
- Occupations: Painter; caricaturist
- Spouse: Violet Bowring (m. 1925)

Walter Armiger Bowring (11 March 1874 – 3 November 1931) was a New Zealand portrait and landscape painter, illustrator, cartoonist and caricaturist, also successful in London and Australia. He was an unofficial World War I artist and a collection of his early work is contained in the Alexander Turnbull Library, Wellington. He entered 14 portraits in Sydney's Archibald Prize from 1925. His subjects included public figures, such as politicians, Governors-General, military men and academics: Richard John Seddon, William Ferguson Massey, Harold Beauchamp, William Rolleston, William Sefton Moorhouse, the Earl of Ranfurly, Lord Mountbatten, Viscount Hawkesbury, Lord Jellicoe, Bernard Freyberg, and a number of prominent women. A number of his World War I works are included in the National Collection of War Art in Archives New Zealand, a collection merged in the 1950s with works from World War II; and three portraits are in the National Portrait Gallery of Australia.

== Early life ==
Walter Bowring was born in Auckland, one of 12 children of Alfred and Elizabeth Bowring. His parents had arrived in New Zealand in 1856 on the Gipsey and his father had a piano warehouse in Symonds Street, Auckland.

Bowring was educated at Auckland Grammar. In 1901 he married Millicent McOwen and had one son and one daughter. They divorced in 1925.

== Career ==
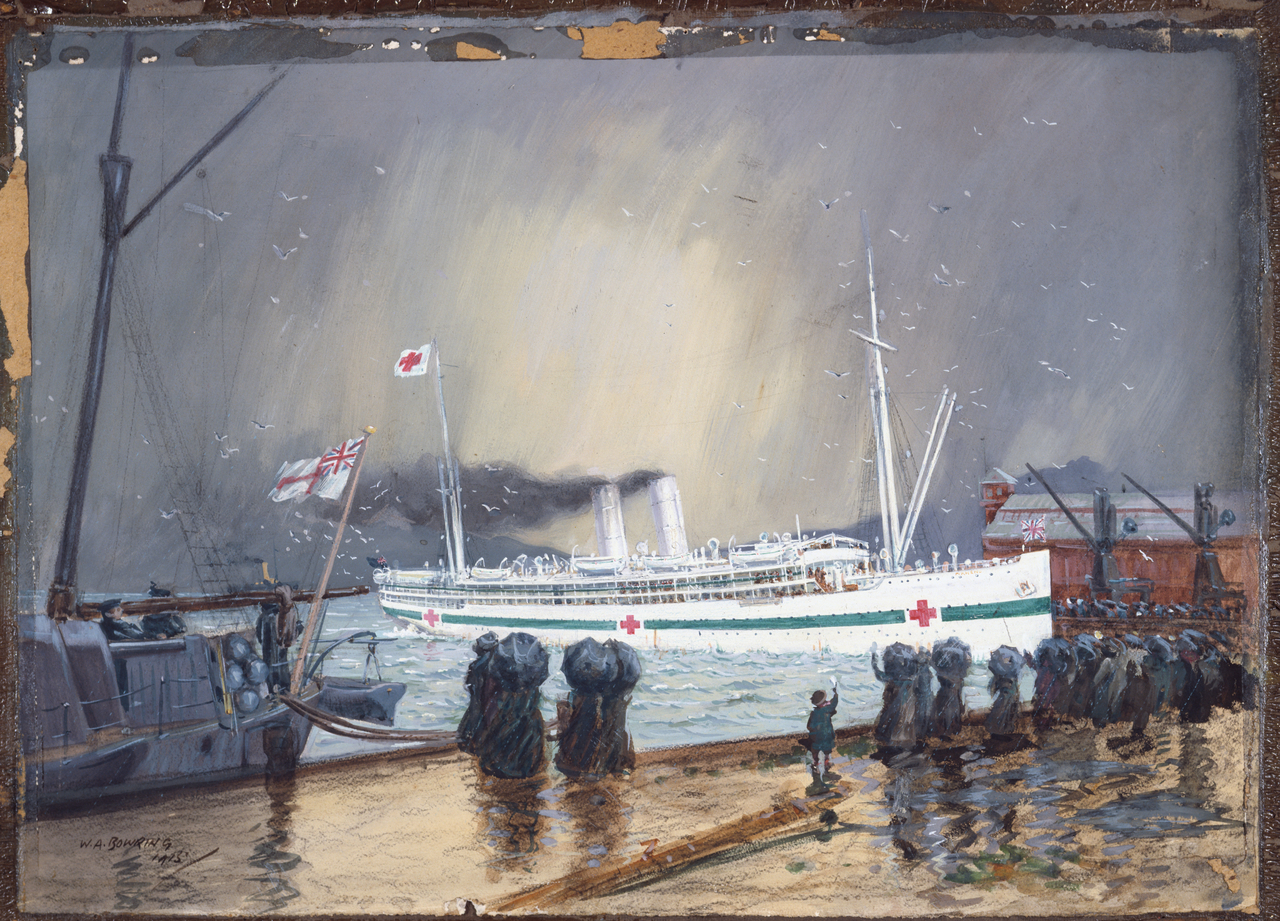
Departure of the Hospital Ship "Maheno" (1915)

Bowring's early works were black and white sketches for New Zealand Observer. He then became a cartoonist for the Spectator (Christchurch) and the Weekly Press. He was represented in the New Zealand International Exhibition of 1906, the New Zealand Academy of Fine Arts in 1894 and 1898 and exhibited nationally in New Zealand up until 1925 when he moved to Sydney. In December 1899, some of his work was reproduced in the New Zealand Illustrated magazine and in 1905 he went to London and studied under William Orpen and Augustus John.

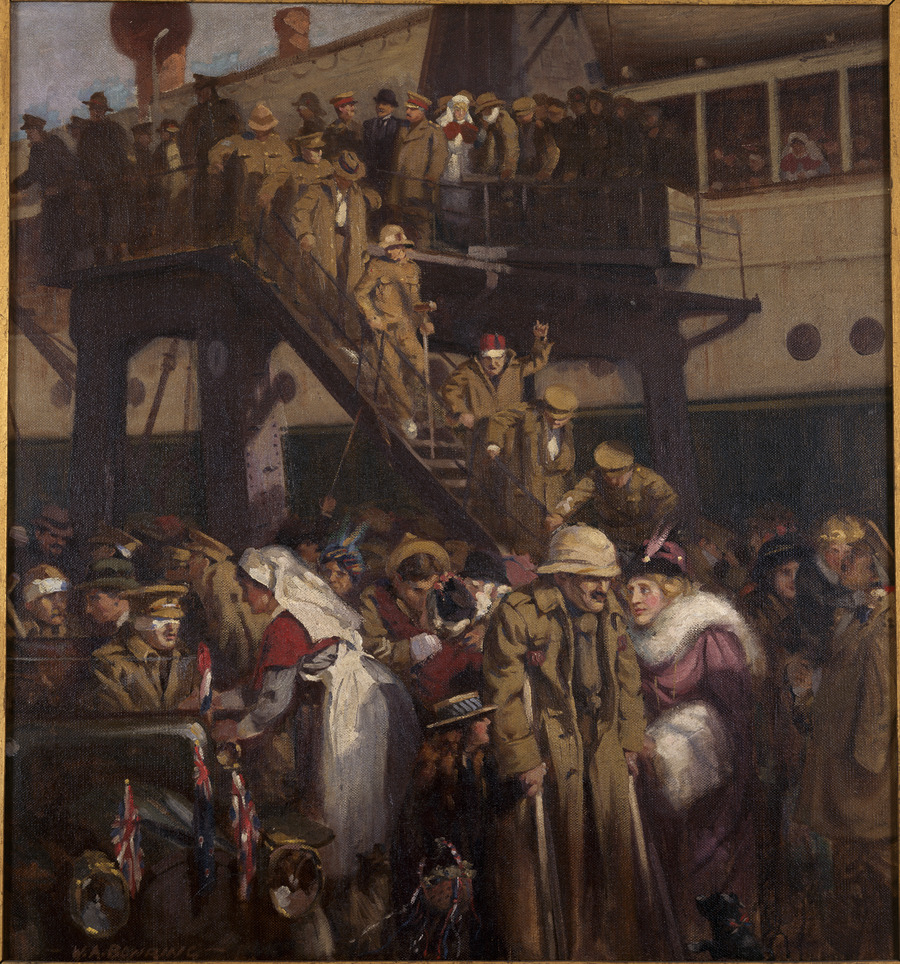
The Homecoming from Gallipoli

In 1918 he applied to become an official war artist for New Zealand. However, the Government preferred to appoint those already serving with the New Zealand Expeditionary Force, or living overseas. Instead, he captured the aftermath of war on the home front.

Works by Bowring featured in an exhibition of World War I and II paintings by New Zealand artists compiled by the National Art Gallery, Wellington in 1952. Among his notable paintings are The Departure of HNZT 13 SS Verdela and 14 RMS Willochra from Lyttelton on December 5, 1914, The hospital ship Maheno (1915), and the poignant Homecoming from Gallipoli, painted in 1916. He also had a cartoon in the Free Lance 1915 of The Maoris at Gallipoli.

On a visit to England in 1921-24 he was elected a member of the Royal Institute of Oil Painters, and the Chelsea Arts Club and exhibited at the Royal Academy and the Royal Society of Portrait Painters in London. He was a contributor to London Punch and other English journals. Walter Bowring was vice-president of the New Zealand Academy of Fine Arts for eight years, resigning in 1925, when he moved to Sydney with his second wife, and fellow artist, Violet Nelson. He exhibited with the Royal Art Society of New South Wales from 1926.

Fourteen of Bowring's portraits were entered in the Art Gallery of New South Wales' Archibald Prize between 1925 and 1931. Two of these were a self-portrait and a portrait of his wife Violet Bowring in 1925. The Archibald Prize is an annual prize in an open competition for the best portrait, usually a prominent person in the field of art, letters, politics or science by an Australasian resident. The trustees of the Art Gallery of NSW judge the prize. The National Portrait Gallery of Australia holds his portraits of Geoffrey Evan Fairfax and James Fairfax of the newspaper dynasty, painted in 1929, and one of the mining engineer James Robert Millar Robertson.

Walter Bowring died in Sydney on 3 November 1931 aged 57.
