= Adele Younghusband =

New Zealand painter and photographer (1878–1969)

- Younghusband c. 1900
- Born: Adela Mary Roche; 3 April 1878; Te Awamutu, New Zealand
- Died: 3 April 1969 (aged 91); Auckland, New Zealand
- Known for: Painting and photography
- Style: Abstract surrealism

Adela Mary Younghusband (née Roche, 3 April 1878 – 3 April 1969), generally known as Adele Younghusband, was a New Zealand painter, photographer and printmaker.

== Biography ==
Adela Mary Roche was born in Te Awamutu on 3 April 1878. She married Frank Younghusband in Christchurch on 1 August 1905, and they went on to have three children, before separating in 1917.

After working as a photographic retoucher in Hamilton, Younghusband became a member of the Auckland Society of Arts in 1909. In 1919, Younghusband and her three children moved to Whangārei where she started working in a photographic studio in, and establishing herself as a successful portrait photographer. In 1921, Younghusband founded the Whangarei Arts and Literary Society, and acted as its secretary. In August 1934, with Ida Carey, Younghusband convened the inaugural meeting of the Waikato Society of Arts in Hamilton. She became its secretary and represented it on the Association of New Zealand Art Societies.

From 1937 to 1940, Younghusband undertook art education and creative experimentation in Australia. During her time in Australia, she was a member of the Victoria Society of Arts. She developed an interest in abstract surrealism and studied with George Bell in Melbourne. In the early 1950s, when she was back in Auckland, she instigated the Phoenix Group of painters. In 1964, Younghusband was made a life member of the Waikato Society of Arts.

Interest has grown in Younghusband's work since her death, notably with survey exhibitions organised by the Whangarei Art Museum, which holds a number of her works. The exhibition Adele Younghusband: In Context was presented in 1998 and toured to venues including the Sarjeant Gallery and Te Tuhi (then known as The Fisher Gallery), and the exhibition Adele Younghusband: The Cursive Line, featuring more than 70 works, was presented in 2008 and toured to venues including the Waikato Museum and the Gus Fisher Gallery where it was shown under the title New Zealand Surrealist. Both exhibitions were curated and toured by Whangarei Art Museum Director, Scott Pothan.

== Art ==
Younghusband has a large and varied body of work, and she continued to produce new pieces well into her eighties. Her paintings depict scenes of everyday life at home and at work, landscapes that highlight people’s interactions with farming, logging, and quarrying, as well as allegorical works exploring themes of religion and war. She also engaged with Māori mythology, incorporating its stories and symbolism into her art.

== Exhibitions ==
=== Selected solo exhibitions ===
Younghusband was exhibited at

- An Exhibition of Paintings and Lino-Cuts by Adele Younghusband, Lodestar Galleries Sydney, 1937
- Solo Exhibition Auckland Society of Arts, 1941
- Solo Exhibition Waikato Society of Arts, 1945
- Solo Exhibition Auckland Society of Arts, 1957
- John Leech Gallery, Auckland, 1991
- Adele Younghusband: In Context, Whangarei Art Museum, 1998 (toured to venues including the Sarjeant Gallery and Te Tuhi (fka The Fisher Gallery)
- Adele Younghusband: The Cursive Line, Whangarei Art Museum, 2008 (toured to venues including Gus Fisher Gallery and Waikato Art Museum)

=== Selected group exhibitions ===
- New Zealand Academy of Fine Arts Annual Exhibition, 1932
- New Zealand Society of Artists First General Exhibition, 1933
- Museum of New Zealand Te Papa Tongarewa, Toi Te Papa | Art Of The Nation, 2005
- Auckland Art Gallery Toi o Tāmaki: Modern Women: Flight of Time, 2025
