= Diocese of Waikato and Taranaki =

Anglican diocese in New Zealand

- Arms of the Diocese of Waikato and Taranaki
- Incumbent; Philip Richardson
- Style: The Most Reverend

Location
- Country: New Zealand
- Territory: North Island
- Ecclesiastical province: Aotearoa, New Zealand and Polynesia
- Headquarters: Taranaki
- Coordinates: 37°47′31″S 175°17′11″E

Statistics
- Parishes: 8 (as of 2023)
- Schools: 5 (as of 2023)

Information
- First holder: Cecil Arthur Cherrington (as Bishop of Waikato)
- Formation: 1926
- Denomination: Anglican
- Cathedral: St Peter's Cathedral; Taranaki Cathedral

Current leadership
- Parent church: Anglican Communion
- Major Archbishop: Primate of New Zealand; Pīhopa Mātāmua
- Bishop: Philip Richardson

Website
- www.wtanglican.nz

The Diocese of Waikato and Taranaki is one of the thirteen dioceses and hui amorangi (Māori bishoprics) of the Anglican Church in Aotearoa, New Zealand and Polynesia. The diocese covers the area from the Waikato to the area surrounding Mount Taranaki in the North Island of New Zealand.

== History ==
The diocese was established in 1926 as the Diocese of Waikato, with Cecil Arthur Cherrington being the first bishop. In 2010, the name of the diocese was changed to the Diocese of Waikato and Taranaki. This reflects the structure of the diocese (since the passage of the Shared Diocesan Episcopacy Statute 2007), with two bishoprics and two co-ordinary (presiding) bishops. That statute was amended in 2017 (before Hartley's translation) to clarify that when one See is vacant, the other bishop also holds that See as sole diocesan bishop — as has been the case since 2018. With the diocese unable to afford two bishops, Richardson established a commission in December 2018 to review the dual-episcopacy arrangement.

== Cathedra ==
When resident in Hamilton, the seat of the Bishop of Waikato and Taranaki is at St Peter's Cathedral; and when resident in Taranaki, the seat of the Bishop is at the Taranaki Cathedral.

The incumbent Bishop of Waikato and Taranaki is Philip Richardson (who has been the archbishop of the New Zealand dioceses since 1 May 2013). Richardson had previously been the only suffragan Bishop in Taranaki in the Waikato diocese from 1999 until the co-diocesan arrangement started in 2008. Since Hartley's translation in 2018, Richardson has been sole diocesan bishop, called Bishop of Waikato and Taranaki.

== List of bishops ==
The following individuals have served as the Bishop of Waikato and Taranaki, or any precursor title:

Bishops of Waikato and Taranaki
Ordinal	Officeholder	Term start	Term end	Notes
Bishops of Waikato
1	Cecil Cherrington	1926	1951	
2	John Holland	1951	1968	
3	Allen Johnston	1968	1980	Also Archbishop of New Zealand from 1972
4	Brian Davis	1980	1986	Also Archbishop of New Zealand from 1986; translated to Wellington
5	Roger Herft	1986	1993	
6	David Moxon	1993	2013	Co-equal diocesan after 2008; senior bishop of the "New Zealand dioceses" from 2006; Co-Presiding Bishop / Pīhopa Aporei, 2006–2008 then Primate / Pīhopa Mātāmua and Archbishop, 2008 onwards.
7	Helen-Ann Hartley	2014	2018	Co-equal diocesan
Bishops of Waikato and Taranaki
8	Philip Richardson	2018	incumbent	Co-equal diocesan 2008–present; previously suffragan Bishop in Taranaki, 1999–2008; senior diocese of the New Zealand dioceses, Primate / Pīhopa Mātāmua and Archbishop since 2013.

== Parishes ==
=== Piako ===
- Cambridge
- Katikati
- Mangakino
- Matamata
- Morrinsville
- Paeroa
- Putāruru
- Tamahere
- Te Aroha
- Tīrau
- Tokoroa
- Waihi
- Waihi Beach
- Whangamatā

=== Taranaki ===
- Bell Block
- Brooklands
- Eltham-Kaponga
- Fitzroy
- Hāwera
- Inglewood
- Manaia
- Ōkato
- Opunake
- Patea
- New Plymouth
- Stratford
- Waitara
- Waverley-Waitotara
- West New Plymouth

=== Waikato ===
- Bryant Park
- Hamilton - St Peter's Cathedral
- Chartwell
- Claudelands
- Forest Lake - Holy Trinity Church
- West Hamilton
- Hamilton East
- Hillcrest
- Huntly
- Melville
- Nawton
- Ngāruawāhia
- Raglan
- Te Kauwhata

=== Waitomo ===
- Kawhia
- Orakau
- Otorohanga
- Piopio-Aria-Mokau
- Taumarunui
- Te Awamutu
- Te Kuiti

== Archdeaconary's of The Anglican Diocese of Taranaki ==
=== Archdeacons of Taranaki ===
- 1902-1912: Ven Robert Cole
- 1912-1926: Ven Frank Evans
- 1930-1960: Ven Gordon Gavin

=== Archdeacons of Tauranga ===
- 1910-1914: Ven Charles Tisdall
- 1921-1936: Ven Frederick Chatterton
- 1936-1965: Ven Reginald Hodgson
- 1972-1976: Ven Donald Ferguson

== Archdeaconary's of the Anglican Diocese of Waikato ==
=== Archdeacons of Waikato ===
- 1913-1929: Ven Edmund Cowie
- 1933-1943: Ven Henry Gillespie

=== Archdeacons of Piako ===
- 1954-1960: Ven Frederick O. Dawson M.C. (Former Principal Chaplain of the CofE in the 2nd NZEF)
