= Justin Duckworth =

Anglican archbishop in New Zealand

The Most Reverend Justin Duckworth
- Bishop of Wellington; Primate of New Zealand and Senior Bishop of the New Zealand Dioceses
- Church: Anglican Church of Aotearoa, New Zealand and Polynesia
- Diocese: Wellington
- In office: 2012–present
- Predecessor: Tom Brown
- Other post: Archbishop and Primate (2024–present)

Personal details
- Born: 1968 (age 57–58)
- Spouse: Jenny
- Education: Victoria University of Wellington; Massey University

Justin Charles Hopkins Duckworth (born 1968) is a New Zealand Anglican bishop. Since 2012, he has been the Anglican Bishop of Wellington, and since 2024 he has been the senior bishop of Tikanga Pākehā in the Anglican Church in Aotearoa, New Zealand and Polynesia and thus one of three co-equal primates of the church.

== Early life and education ==
Justin Duckworth was raised in Stokes Valley, New Zealand. His parents, Claire and Les Duckworth, separated when he was ten years old. His mother was an art teacher. Duckworth joined a Christian youth group, Youth for Christ, as a teenager and was baptized at age 15. He earned a Bachelor of Science degree at Victoria University, then went on to earn advanced degrees in philosophy and theology. He also completed a master's degree in development studies at Massey University.

== Urban Vision ==
Duckworth worked with youth while studying. After graduating from Victoria, he married Jenny Boland, whom he had met in the Youth for Christ group. Together, they ran a home for teenage girls in Newtown, a suburb of Wellington, New Zealand. After seven years, they moved to Upper Cuba street in Wellington, where Duckworth engaged in street ministry, reaching out to sex workers, the homeless and other marginalized persons. The Duckworths began creating a community called Urban Vision. The community established communal homes in poor or disadvantaged parts of Wellington, where residents lived together in a cooperative model. The movement developed into a new religious communal order, a modern interpretation of the ancient monastic tradition within Christianity.

The Duckworths eventually established a contemporary monastery for the Urban Vision community, Ngatiawa, located in the valley of Reikorangi, where they lived for ten years. The community holds prayer services three times a day, and shares communal meals. In 2012, there were approximately 20 people living in the monastery on a regular basis and about one thousand visitors in a year.

== Ordained ministry ==
Duckworth was ordained in 2005. His work was not centered on parish ministry, but on building a contemporary communal order and monastery. He did not serve as priest in a local church.

His nomination as bishop in 2012 was surprising to some in the church, because his ministry was unconventional. Nevertheless, the selection was ratified by the House of Bishops and the General Synod. Duckworth was consecrated a bishop and installed on 30 June 2012. The service was held in the Anglican Cathedral in Wellington, and was attended by more than 1200 people. He succeeded Tom Brown, who served as the diocesan bishop in Wellington from 1998 to 2012. In 2024, Duckworth was elected senior bishop of Tikanga Pākehā and took on the title of archbishop and primate.

== Personal life ==
The Duckworths have three grown-up children. Justin and Jenny moved to Whanganui in 2018, to be closer to the Anglican churches in the northern part of the diocese of Wellington. Duckworth is known for his dreadlocks, and for often traveling barefoot.

Anglican Communion titles
Preceded by Tom Brown	Bishop of Wellington; 2012–present	Incumbent
Preceded by Philip Richardson	Primate of New Zealand; Senior Bishop of the New Zealand Dioceses; 2024–present	Incumbent
