= Cecil Cherrington =

New Zealand bishop

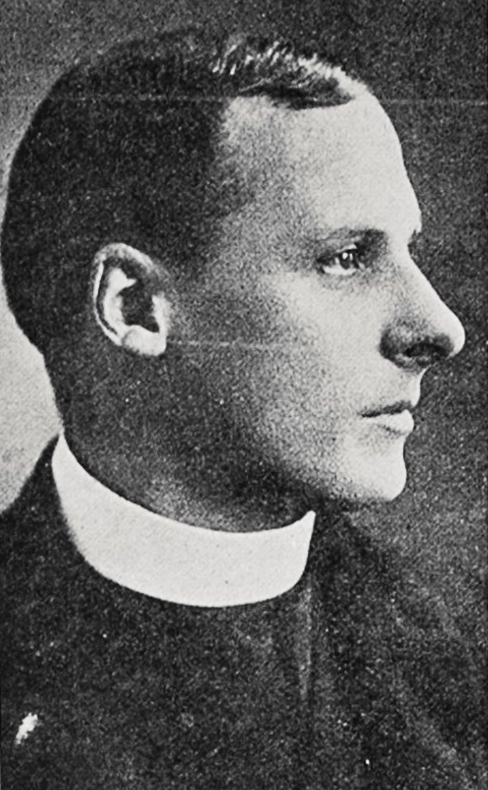
Cecil Cherrington

Cecil Arthur Cherrington (1877–1950) was an eminent Anglican Bishop in the 20th century. He was born into an ecclesiastical family and was educated at London University. Ordained in 1897, his first post was a curacy at St Chad's, Liverpool. He was then successively Chaplain of Birkenhead School, a Lecturer at Lichfield Theological College, Vicar of Tunstall, Archdeacon of Mauritius and finally in 1926 the first Bishop of Waikato. In 1935, he was awarded the King George V Silver Jubilee Medal. He died in post on 10 August 1950. Bishop Cherrington founded Waikato Diocesan School for Girls.

Anglican Communion titles
Preceded by Inaugural appointment	Bishop of Waikato; 1926–1950	Succeeded by John Tristram Holland
