= Anglican Diocese of Wellington =

Anglican dioceses in New Zealand

Diocese of Wellington
- Bishopric
- Arms of the Diocese of Wellington
- Incumbent: Justin Duckworth
- Style: The Right Reverend

Location
- Country: New Zealand
- Territory: North Island
- Ecclesiastical province: Aotearoa, New Zealand and Polynesia
- Headquarters: Wellington
- Coordinates: 41°16′34″S 174°46′36″E

Statistics
- Parishes: 60 (unknown date)

Information
- First holder: Charles Abraham
- Formation: 1858
- Denomination: Anglican
- Cathedral: Wellington Cathedral of St Paul

Current leadership
- Parent church: Anglican Communion
- Major Archbishop: Primate of New Zealand; Pīhopa Mātāmua
- Bishop: Justin Duckworth
- Assistant bishop: Anashuya Fletcher

Website
- www.wn.anglican.org.nz

The Diocese of Wellington is one of the thirteen dioceses and hui amorangi (Māori bishoprics) of the Anglican Church in Aotearoa, New Zealand and Polynesia. The diocese covers the area between the bottom of the North Island of New Zealand up to the area of Mount Ruapehu.

The seat of the Bishop of Wellington is at the Wellington Cathedral of St Paul. The current Bishop of Wellington, since 2012, has been Justin Duckworth, joined by newly elected Assistant Bishop Anashuya Fletcher (2024).

There are approximately 60 parishes and mission districts within the diocese of Wellington.

== History ==
The diocese's first bishop, Charles Abraham, was consecrated in 1858. An attempt was made in the 21st General Synod (1919) to make the Bishop of Wellington ex officio Primate and Metropolitan; this failed in the 22nd Synod (1922).

The Archbishop David Moxon announced on 29 April 2012 that Justin Duckworth was elected as the 11th Bishop of Wellington. Duckworth was installed on 30 June 2012.

The diocese celebrated its sesquicentenary in 2008; the celebrations included pilgrimages throughout the diocese.

== Cathedral ==
Old St Paul's, the second Church of St Paul in Wellington, was the pro-cathedral church for the Anglican Diocese of Wellington from 1866 to 1964 and remains consecrated, despite now owned by Heritage New Zealand (formerly the New Zealand Historic Places Trust). The first parish church for the early settlers, dedicated to St Paul, was behind where the Beehive stands today: a replica stands at the Bolton Street entrance to an early cemetery for Wellington, alongside the original sextons cottage. The current Wellington Cathedral church for the Diocese was dedicated, partially completed, in the name of St Paul in 1964. Completion was in stages and in 2001 it was consecrated.

== List of bishops ==
The following individuals have served as the Bishop of Wellington, or any precursor title:

Ordinal	Officeholder	Term start	Term end	Notes
1	Charles Abraham	4 September 1858	1 June 1870	Previously Archdeacon of Waitemata
2	Octavius Hadfield	1870	1893	Previously Archdeacon of Kapiti; also Primate of New Zealand, 1890–1893
3	Frederic Wallis	1895	1911	Afterwards Archdeacon of Wilts UK, 1911
4	Thomas Sprott	1911	1936	
5	St Barbe Holland	1936	1946	Afterwards Dean of Norwich, UK
6	Reginald Owen	1947	1960	Also Archbishop of New Zealand, 1952–1960
7	Henry Baines	1960	1972	Translated from Singapore
8	Edward Norman	1973	1986	Previously Archdeacon of Wellington and vicar of the Parish of Karori (Church of St Mary)
9	Brian Davis	1986	1997	Translated from Waikato; also Archbishop of New Zealand
10	Tom Brown	1998	2012	Previously Archdeacon of Belmont and vicar of Lower Hutt (Church of St James)
11	Justin Duckworth	30 June 2012	incumbent	

== Assistant Bishops of Wellington ==
- E. J. Rich
- 1991–1998 Tom Brown
- 23 February 1991 – 1999: Brian Carrell, Bishop in Palmerston North
- 1997–?: Hāpai Winiata
- 2 June 2017 – 2022: Eleanor Sanderson<Bishop of Hull>

- 2024–present: Anashuya Fletcher

== Archdeaconries ==
=== Archdeacons of Wellington ===
- 1870-1888: Ven Arthur Stock
- 1888-1919: Ven Thomas Fancourt
- 1961: Ven Henry Childs-(Later Dean of Waiapu Cathedral)
- 1965: Ven Harry Arnold
- Ven Edward Norman-(Later Bishop of Wellington)
- 2016-2019: Ven Fr Stephen King
