= Brian Davis (bishop) =

New Zealand archbishop (1934–1998)

Brian Newton Davis CNZM (28 October 1934 – 22 June 1998) was the Anglican Bishop of Waikato from 1980 to 1986 and Archbishop and Primate of New Zealand and Bishop of Wellington from 1986 to 1997.

== Biography ==
=== Childhood and education ===
Davis was born in Stratford, New Zealand and underwent secondary education at Stratford High School, Taranaki. He studied to be a teacher at Ardmore Training College, Papakura and then went on to study a M.A.(Hons) in geography at Victoria University of Wellington. He also studied at College House, Christchurch, before finally completing his studies at St John's College, Auckland in order to become an Anglican priest.

=== Ministry ===
After ordination, Davis served as a curate at Karori, Wellington. He was then appointed the vicar at Dannevirke and later became Dean and Vicar General of Waiapu. In 1980 he was appointed the Bishop of Waikato and in 1986 was elected the Archbishop of New Zealand and Bishop of Wellington. He resigned both posts effective 1 July 1997.

In 1990, Davis was awarded the New Zealand 1990 Commemoration Medal. In the 1997 Queen's Birthday Honours, he was appointed a Companion of the New Zealand Order of Merit, for services to the Anglican Church and the community.
