= David Moxon =

New Zealand Anglican bishop

The Most Reverend Sir David Moxon KNZM GCStJ
- Archbishop Emeritus
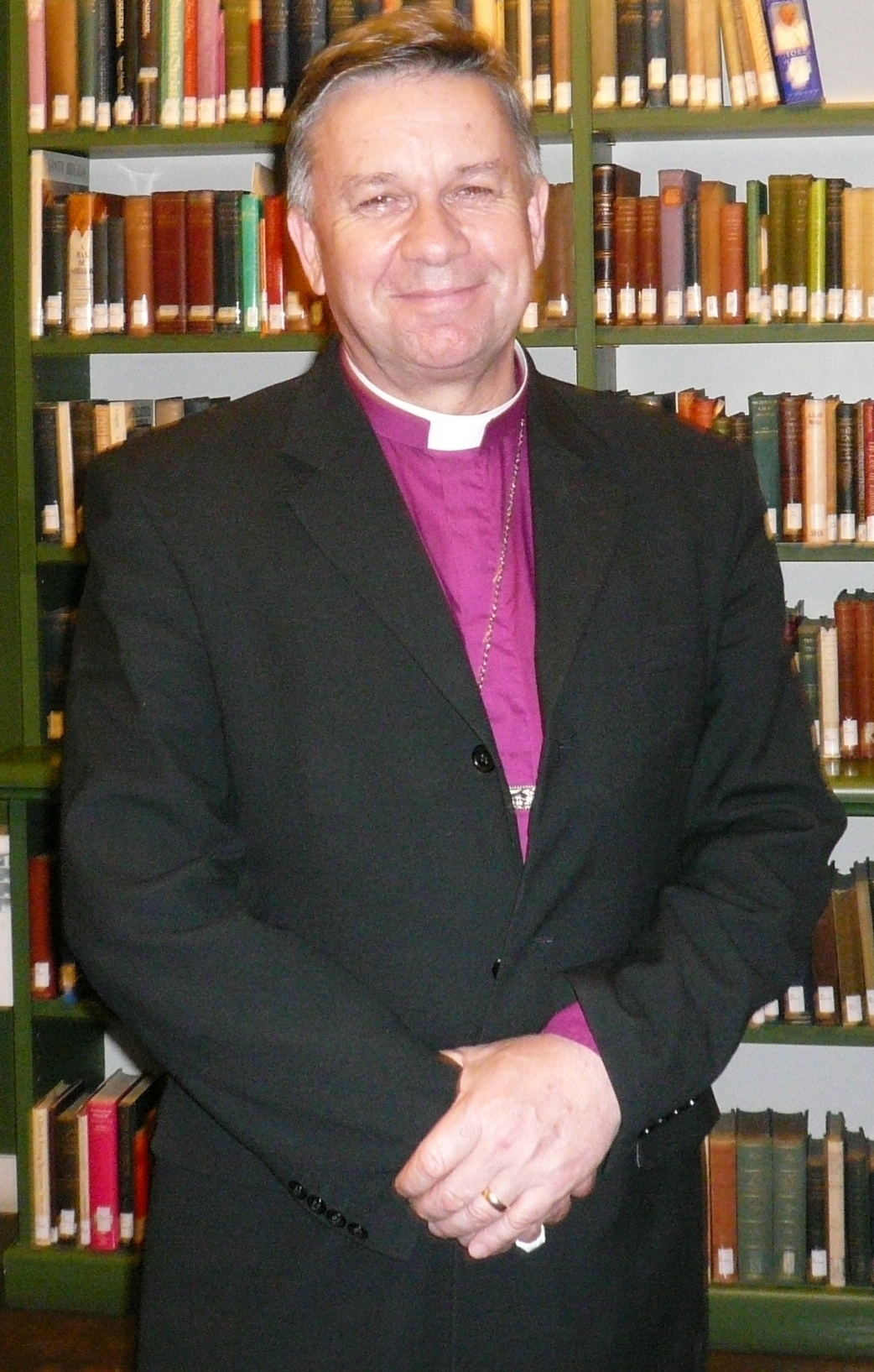
- Church: Anglican Church in Aotearoa, New Zealand and Polynesia
- Other posts: Archbishop of Canterbury's Representative to the Holy See (2013–2017); Archbishop of New Zealand (2006–2013); Bishop of Waikato (1993–2013)

Orders
- Ordination: 1978 (deacon); 1979 (priest)
- Consecration: 13 August 1993

Personal details
- Born: David John Moxon; 6 September 1951 (age 75)
- Denomination: Anglican
- Residence: Hamilton, New Zealand
- Spouse: Tureiti Moxon
- Children: Kirihimete Moxon; Te Aro Moxon; Tureia Moxon; Awatea Moxon

Sir David John Moxon (Note: The title 'Sir' is not used in the United Kingdom for knighted clergy for historic reasons, but it is officially provided for in New Zealand and some other Commonwealth countries by their respective Governors-General.) KNZM GCStJ (born 6 September 1951) is a New Zealand Anglican bishop. He was until June 2017, the Archbishop of Canterbury's Representative to the Holy See and Director of the Anglican Centre in Rome. He was previously the Bishop of Waikato in the Diocese of Waikato and Taranaki, the archbishop of the New Zealand dioceses and one of the three primates of the Anglican Church in Aotearoa, New Zealand and Polynesia.

== Early life ==
David Moxon was born in Palmerston North, New Zealand, in 1951. He was educated at Freyberg High School, where he was head boy. After one year at Massey University Palmerston North in 1971, he then attended the University of Canterbury/College House, graduating with a Bachelor of Arts degree in education and psychology in 1974, before studying again at Massey University, where he graduated with a master's degree with honours in education and sociology in 1976. In 1975, as an ordinand for the Diocese of Waiapu, he studied theology at the University of Oxford Honours School, based at St Peter's College. He graduated from Oxford with a bachelor's degree with honours in 1978, converted to a master's degree by seniority in 1982. He also gained a Certificate in Maori Studies from Waikato University and a Licentiate in Theology (LTh) from the Bishopric of Aotearoa.

== Ordained ministry ==
=== Priest ===
Before training to become a priest, in 1970 Moxon served a one-year term as a youth worker with Volunteer Service Abroad in Fiji, and then worked as a tutor in the Education Department at Massey University during 1974–75. In 1978 Moxon was appointed a deacon curate at Havelock North, and in 1979 he was ordained as a priest in the Diocese of Waiapu. He remained at Havelock North until 1981, and was then appointed Vicar at Gate Pa, Tauranga, where he served for six years. In 1987 Moxon was appointed Director of Theological Education by Extension for the Anglican Church in Aotearoa New Zealand and Polynesia, a position he held until 1993. He was also a member of the Commission which produced A New Zealand Prayer Book: He Karakia Mihinare o Aotearoa.

=== Bishop ===
On 13 August 1993, Moxon was consecrated a bishop in Hamilton, New Zealand, replacing Roger Herft as Bishop of Waikato.

In 2006, Moxon was appointed as the Senior Bishop of the New Zealand (Pakeha) dioceses and in 2008, a primate of the Anglican Church in Aotearoa, New Zealand and the Pacific, as part of New Zealand's new tripartite model of Anglican episcopacy. As a primate, he worked alongside William Brown Turei (Maori) and Winston Halapua (Polynesia). Also in 2008, Moxon's diocese, Waikato, was – uniquely for any Anglican diocese – altered such that the Bishops of Waikato and of Taranaki would be co-equal diocesan bishops. Philip Richardson, whom Moxon had appointed as the first (and only) suffragan Bishop in Taranaki became Moxon's equal as Bishop of Taranaki and in 2010 the diocese was renamed the Diocese of Waikato and Taranaki. Richardson would later succeed Moxon as archbishop for the New Zealand dioceses.

Moxon was the Anglican chair of the third phase of the Anglican-Roman Catholic International Commission (ARCIC III) from 2011 until 2018. In this capacity Moxon also served as a Governor on the Board of the Anglican Centre in Rome until 2013, when he became its director, and then resumed the board of governors position from 2017 to 2018. Moxon was chair of "The Bible in the Life of the Church" project for the Anglican Communion, a project endorsed by the Anglican Consultative Council (ACC 15) in November 2012; was convenor of the Conference of Anglican Religious Orders in Aotearoa New Zealand (CAROANZ); a patron of A Rocha, New Zealand, the Christian environment action group; a president of the New Zealand Bible Society, and the chair of the Hamilton-based Mahi Mihinare Anglican Action, a "justice through service" agency from 1993 until 2013. He was also an inaugural board member of the Ngati Haua Mahi trust, a work skills program for Maori in the Piako area from 2010 until 2013.

In 1995, Moxon represented the Conference of Churches of Aotearoa New Zealand on board HMNZS Tui, as part of the New Zealand government's peaceful protest against the detonation of nuclear bombs at Mururoa Atoll in French Polynesia. In 1998 he joined the General Synod and bishops of the church in leading an ecumenical "Hikoi of Hope" march from all over the country, which amounted to more than 30,000 people in Wellington, to present to the government the growing needs of unemployed and impoverished New Zealanders. The data for the Hikoi included local Christian social service experience. He and other church and community leaders in Hamilton opposed the building of a new casino in the city before the Casino Control Authority on the grounds of community well-being. The case, supported by the then Prime Minister Helen Clark was later upheld in court but then overturned on appeal. However, a government moratorium on casinos in New Zealand followed. Moxon also represented the bishops on the Tikanga Pakeha Anglican Care Network.

A wing of Bishop's Hall at Waikato Diocesan School for Girls and the residential age care building complex at Selwyn St Andrew's Village Cambridge, are named after him. Moxon is a Fellow of St Paul's Collegiate School Hamilton, a Fellow of St Margaret's College in the University of Otago, and an Honorary Fellow of St Peter's College in the University of Oxford.

It was announced on 4 December 2012 that Moxon was to resign his Aotearoa New Zealand and Polynesia posts following his appointment as the Archbishop of Canterbury's Representative to the Holy See and director of the Anglican Centre in Rome. Moxon was named an archbishop emeritus of the Anglican Church in Aotearoa New Zealand and Polynesia on 16 April 2013 by the General Synod / Te Hinota Whanui. In April 2013, the Mayor of Hamilton on behalf of the city council, named him an ambassador for the city. He began his ministry in Rome on 10 May 2013 and attended the first meeting between the new Archbishop of Canterbury, Justin Welby, and Pope Francis, in Rome on 14 June 2013.

In May 2015, Moxon was awarded a Doctorate of Literature (honoris causa) by Massey University. In April 2016 he was made an honorary Doctor of the university by the University of Waikato

During Moxon's time in Rome, the Anglican Centre has focused its mission aspect on ecumenical education and networking in the area of modern slavery and human trafficking, as well as ecumenical networking for refugee ministry. On 5 October 2016, Moxon helped facilitate the fourth meeting of Francis and Welby, where they publicly renewed their respective communions' commitment to deeper dialogue and greater mutual partnership in mission, as part of the 50th anniversary of the first official visit of an Anglican Archbishop of Canterbury to a Pope, and of the establishment of the Anglican Centre in Rome. Moxon and the Orthodox Archbishop Gennadios, representing their respective communions, supported Pope Francis in his ecumenical statements at St Paul's outside the walls in Rome. Moxon's term in Rome is described in Mary Reath's book "An Open Door: The Anglican Centre in Rome, 2003 to 2016", Canterbury Press, 2016, and in the UK Church Times 16 June 2017 article, "Moxon moves on", by the Vatican journalist, Philippa Hitchen.

Moxon completed his term of service in Rome by a private audience with Pope Francis on 16 June 2017, and returned to New Zealand to retire. Moxon was succeeded by the former Anglican Primate Archbishop of Burundi, the Most Reverend Bernard Ntahoturi, who took up his position in Rome in October 2017.

In retirement Moxon has been made patron of the Faith Community Nurses Association; He Pīhopa Āwhina (an honorary assistant bishop) in Te Manawa o Te Wheke since 2017; a member of the Proprietor's board of Taranaki Diocesan School for Girls Stratford, a member of the board of trustees and a Fellow of St Paul's Collegiate School Hamilton, a Board of Governor's Fellow of College House Christchurch and Priory Dean for Aotearoa New Zealand, of the Most Venerable Order of the Hospital of Saint John of Jerusalem (Order of St John). He rejoined the Ngati Haua Mahi Trust in November 2018. Moxon is co-chair with Cardinal Tobin of New Jersey, of the Walking Together Foundation advisory committee, which seeks to fund Catholic and Anglican Bishop partnerships for aid, development, justice and peace globally. Moxon is also a founding trustee of the new Solomon Islands Medical Mission Trust.

== Personal life ==
Moxon is married to Māori health leader Tureiti Moxon, who has Ngāti Kahungunu and Ngāi Tahu Māori links. She was trained in early childhood education and then in law and is currently the managing director of Hamilton primary health provider Te Kohao Health and chair of the National Urban Māori Authority. They have four adult children.

== Honours ==
In the 2014 New Year Honours, he was appointed a Knight Companion of the New Zealand Order of Merit for services to the Anglican Church and was made Knight of the Order of St John in the 2024 Special Honours.

In March 2017, Moxon was awarded the Lambeth Cross for Ecumenism at a reception at Lambeth Palace London, by the Archbishop of Canterbury, Justin Welby.

Moxon was advanced Bailiff Grand Cross of the Order of Saint John (GCStJ) on appointment as Prelate of the Order on 24 June 2025.

He was created a Companion of the Roll of Honour of the Memorial of Merit of King Charles the Martyr in 2021.

== Arms ==
Gules two bars wavy Or between in chief three plates each charged with a rose Gules barbed and seeded Proper and in base a Māori Tā Moko symbol Or

Coat of arms of David Moxon
| Adopted Granted by the College of Arms London, 26 August 2008 Crest On a helm with a wreath Or an Gules, upon a mount Or a demi heron wings displayed Argent beaked Or in front of the patriarchal cross Or fimbriated Gules Motto KO TE AMORANGI KI MUA (Put spiritual things first) |

== Notes ==
Anglican Communion titles
| Preceded by Roger Herft | Bishop of Waikato; 1993–2013 | Succeeded by Helen-Ann Hartley |
| Preceded by George Connor (as co-presiding bishop) | Primate of New Zealand and Senior Bishop of the New Zealand Dioceses; 2006–2013 | Succeeded by Philip Richardson |
| Preceded by David Richardson | Director of the Anglican Centre in Rome and Representative of the Archbishop of Canterbury to the Holy See; 2013–2017 | Succeeded by Bernard Ntahoturi |
