= Philip Richardson (bishop) =

New Zealand Anglican bishop (born 1958)

The Most Reverend Philip Richardson
- Bishop of Waikato and Taranaki; Archbishop Emeritus
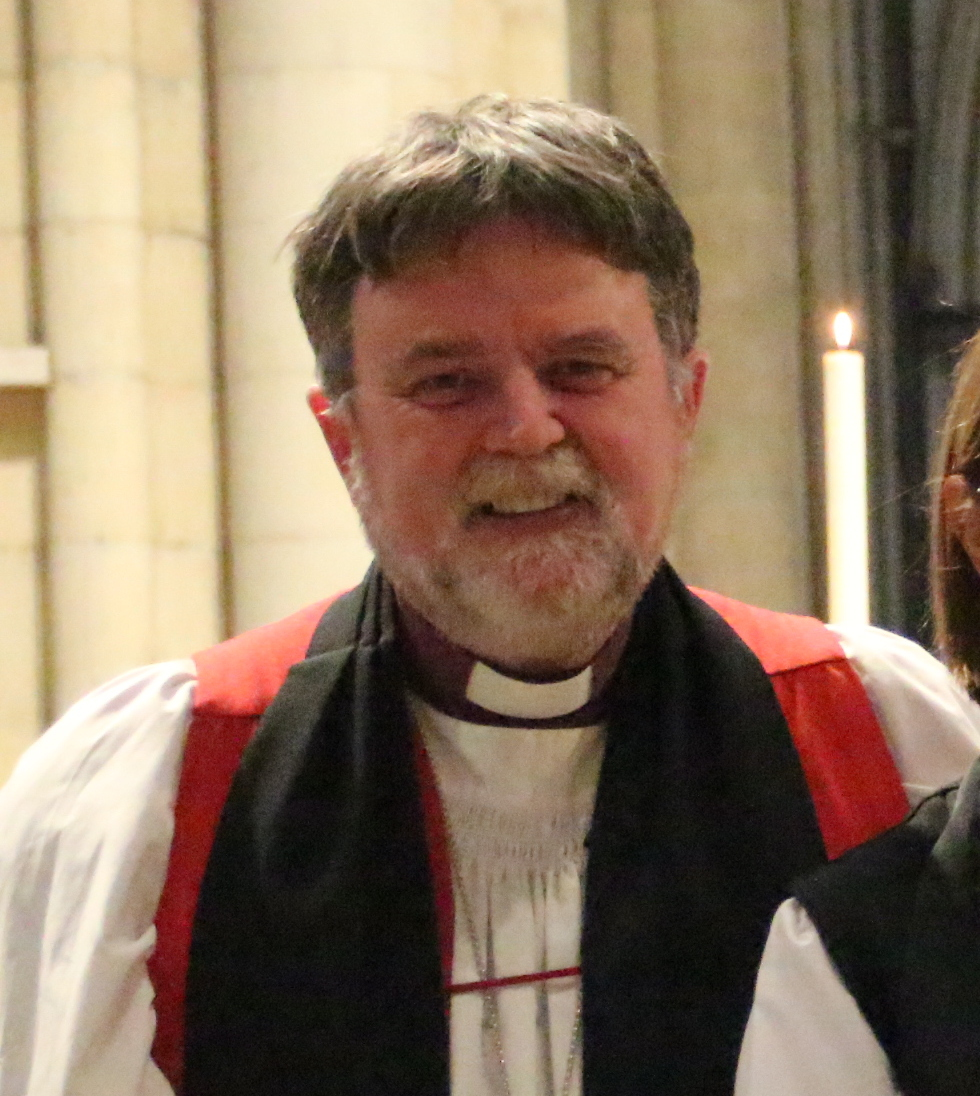
- Richardson in 2022
- Church: Anglican Church of Aotearoa, New Zealand and Polynesia
- Diocese: Waikato and Taranaki
- See: Taranaki
- In office: 2008–present
- Predecessor: Helen-Ann Hartley (as co-diocesan bishop)
- Other posts: Archbishop and Primate (2013–2023); Suffragan Bishop in Taranaki (1999–2008) co-diocesan Bishop of Taranaki (since 2008); Bishop of Waikato and Taranaki (since 2018)

Personal details
- Born: 1958 (age 67–68) Devonport, New Zealand

Philip Richardson (born 1958 in Devonport) is a New Zealand Anglican bishop. Since 2018, he has been the Bishop of Waikato and Taranaki, diocesan bishop of the Diocese of Waikato and Taranaki. Since 2013, he has also been the Senior Bishop of the New Zealand dioceses (Tikanga Pakeha); this made him one of the three co-equal Archbishops and Primates of the Anglican Church of Aotearoa, New Zealand and Polynesia. He announced his intention of stepping down as Primate in 2023 and completed his service as senior bishop of the New Zealand dioceses on 30 June 2023. Philip was appointed Archbishop Emeritus status by the GSCC policy in place and was effected upon the end of his tenure on 23 June 2023

From 1992 to 1999, Richardson was warden of Selwyn College at the University of Otago. From his consecration on 10 July 1999 until 2008, he was the suffragan Bishop in Taranaki under the diocesan Bishop of Waikato in the then-Diocese of Waikato. In 2008, he became co-diocesan Bishop of Taranaki; but since the 2018 vacancy in the See of Waikato, he has been sole diocesan bishop, called Bishop of Waikato and Taranaki.

Anglican Communion titles
New title	Bishop in Taranaki (suffragan bishop in Waikato); 1999–2008	role ended
New title	Bishop of Taranaki (co-diocesan bishop) (sole diocesan since 2018 "Bishop of Waikato and Taranaki"); 2008–present	Incumbent
Preceded by David Moxon	Primate of New Zealand (Pakeha); 2013–2023	Succeeded by Vacant
