= Taimalelagi Fagamalama Tuatagaloa-Leota =

Samoan Anglican archdeacon

The Venerable Taimalelagi Fagamalama Tuatagaloa-Leota

Personal life
- Born: Taimalelagi Fagamalama Tuatagaloa Samoa
- Other name: Taimalelagi F. Tuatagaloa-Matalavea

Religious life
- Religion: Anglican
- Church: Anglican Church of Aotearoa, New Zealand and Polynesia

Senior posting
- Post: Anglican Communion's UN Observer

Taimalelagi Fagamalama Tuatagaloa-Leota is a Samoan Anglican archdeacon in the Anglican Church of Aotearoa, New Zealand and Polynesia. She served as the UN Observer for the Anglican Communion from 2001 to 2006. Before being ordained as a priest, she was the first lay archdeacon in the Diocese of Polynesia.

== Personal life ==
Taimalelagi (Tai) Fagamalama Tuatagaloa was born in Samoa. In her childhood, she attended services at the Congregational Church of Samoa. She completed a certificate in general education in New Zealand in 1964. In 1984, she graduated from the University of Samoa with a Bachelor of Arts in Accounting and Administration.

She married and moved to Suva, Fiji, where she attended St. Luke's Anglican Church in Laucala Bay, with her husband who was a member of the Anglican church. She took the name Tuatagaloa-Mataleva after her marriage. Reverend Winston Halapua was the priest at St. Luke's church at the time; he would later become a bishop. It was during this time in her life that Tuatagaloa-Mataleva became a member of the Anglican church.

Tuatagaloa-Mataleva was widowed when her first husband died; she later remarried. By 2006, she was using the family name Tuatagaloa-Leota.

In 2009, an earthquake and tsunami hit Samoa, and devastated parts of the country, including the southern coast of Upola where Tuatagaloa-Leota's home village is located. One of her sons was injured in the tsumami. Tuatagaloa-Leota was living in Auckland at the time.

== Career ==
Tuatagaloa-Mataleva served as a Programme Officer for the United Nations Development Programme (UNDP), overseeing UNDP activities in the islands of Niue, Tokelau, and Samoa. After four years in this role, she then served as the Operations Manager for the Samoa office of the UNDP.

Tuatagaloa-Mataleva was active in the Anglican church as a lay leader before becoming professionally employed by the church. From 1985 to 1993, she was a lay representative to the Anglican Consultative Council. She also served as President of the National Council of Churches Women in Samoa. In 2000, she served as co-president of that year's General Synod of the Anglican Church of Aotearoa, New Zealand and Polynesia.

By 2001, she had been made an archdeacon in the Diocese of Polynesia in the Anglican Church of Aotearoa, New Zealand and Polynesia. As she was not yet ordained a priest, she became the first lay person elevated to the position of archdeacon in the diocese. Since 2001, she has been known affectionately within church circles as Archdeacon Tai.

After she had been made an archdeacon, Tuatagaloa-Mataleva was appointed by the Archbishop of Canterbury to serve as the UN Observer for the Anglican Communion, succeeding Bishop Herbert Donovan. She served in this role for five years, from August 2001 to July 2006. Among other issues, she advocated for the rights of women and children as part of her work at the UN. In her final year in this post, she led a delegation of Anglican women to the 50th anniversary celebrations and meetings for the UN Commission of the Status of Women, held in New York City from 27 February to 4 March 2006. After Tuatagaloa-Leota completed her term, the Archbishop of Canterbury appointed Hellen Grace Wangusa as the next UN Observer for the Anglican Communion.

On 12 July 2009, Tuatagaloa-Leota was ordained to the priesthood at a service in the Holy Trinity Cathedral in Auckland, New Zealand. She was ordained by three bishops: Winston Halapua, John Paterson, and Kito Pikaahu.

== Awards and recognition ==
In 2005, Tuatagaloa-Leota was appointed a member of the Order of Samoa. She has also been awarded the Cross of St. Augustine by the Archbishop of Canterbury. She was awarded an honorary Doctor of Divinity degree from Ignatius University at a ceremony held in New York City in 2006.

John Paterson, the presiding bishop of New Zealand at the time of her appointment as Anglican Observer to the United Nations, has described her as "a person of deep personal faith, a person with significant international experience." He also noted that she was "blessed with great personal warmth, charm and dignity."

== See also ==
- Religion in Samoa
- Ordination of women in the Anglican Communion
