= Primate of New Zealand =

Leader of the Anglican Church in New Zealand

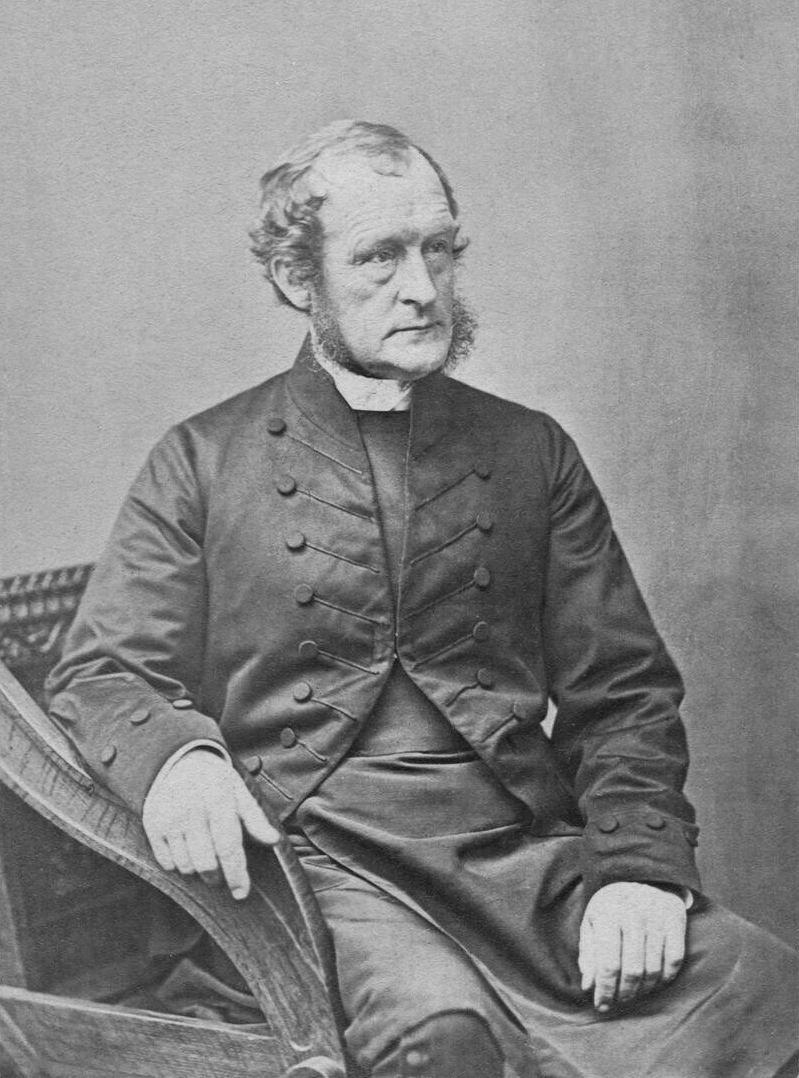
George Augustus Selwyn was the first bishop of New Zealand.

Primate of New Zealand is a title held by a bishop who leads the Anglican Church in Aotearoa, New Zealand and Polynesia. Since 2006, the Senior Bishop of each tikanga (Māori, Pākehā, Pasefika) serves automatically as one of three co-equal Primates-and-Archbishops. Previously, one of these three would be Presiding Bishop and the other two Co-Presiding Bishops; and before that there was only one Primate.

== Bishop and metropolitan ==
George Selwyn was consecrated Bishop of New Zealand on 17 October 1841: he was the sole bishop over a very large territory, including all New Zealand and very many South Pacific islands. In his lifetime, as the Anglican ministry in New Zealand grew, that one diocese was divided several times: by letters patent dated 22 September 1858, Selwyn was made metropolitan bishop over the other dioceses and called Bishop of New Zealand and Metropolitan. By 1868, New Zealand had seven dioceses, Selwyn had come to be referred to as "the Primate", and the General Synod constitution as amended that year used this term.

Metropolitan of New Zealand
From	Until	Incumbent	Notes
1858	1869	George Selwyn	Bishop of New Zealand, 1841–1869; called Primate by 1868

== Primate and metropolitan ==
At the same Synod, Selwyn having announced his intention to resign, a Statute was adopted for the election of the Primate (and Metropolitan) from among the bishops diocesan (who retained their See) and Harper, Bishop of Christchurch was so elected (to take office upon Selwyn's resignation). The same statute created the role of Senior Bishop — being the bishop consecrated first (excluding any former primate), and Acting Primate in certain circumstances. Primates of this era occasionally used the style Archbishop of New Zealand; and gained the archiepiscopal style the Most Reverend between the 5th General Synod (1871) and the 6th (1874). An attempt was made in the 21st Synod (1919) to make the Bishop of Wellington ex officio Primate and Metropolitan; this failed in the 22nd Synod (1922), which did, however, amend the Canons and officially grant the title Primate and Archbishop of New Zealand.

Primates of New Zealand
From	Until	Incumbent	Notes
1869	1890	Henry Harper	Bishop of Christchurch, 1856–1890
1890	1893	Octavius Hadfield	Bishop of Wellington, 1870–1893
1893	1902	William Cowie	Bishop of Auckland, 1869–1902; died in office
1904	1919	Samuel Nevill	Acting Primate since 1902; Bishop of Dunedin, 1871–1919

== Primate and archbishop ==
Throughout the 20th century, the church in New Zealand developed an understanding for the different cultures within it. In 1925, the Diocese of Polynesia began as a missionary diocese of the church. In 1928, the first Bishop of Aotearoa, ministering to the Māori, was consecrated as suffragan bishop to the Bishop of Waiapu. In the 1970s, Melanesia became a separate ecclesiastical province from New Zealand, and the Bishop of Aotearoa became a full-ranking diocesan, with a diocese covering all of New Zealand. Under the primacy of Brian Davis, Polynesia became a fully-fledged diocese and a review of church structures was begun.

In 1992, the General Synod of the church set up five hui amorangi, or regional bishoprics, to serve under the Bishop of Aotearoa. The Church of the Province of New Zealand also adopted its current name, the Anglican Church in Aotearoa, New Zealand and Polynesia, to demonstrate its ownership by the three tikanga. The same Synod limited the Primate to a ten-year term, with re-election to one further four-year term.

Primates and Archbishops of New Zealand
From	Until	Incumbent	Notes
1922	1925	Churchill Julius	Bishop of Christchurch, 1890–1925; Acting Primate since 1919
1925	1940	Alfred Averill	Bishop of Auckland, 1914–1940
1940	1951	Campbell West-Watson	Bishop of Christchurch, 1926–1951
1952	1960	Reginald Owen	Bishop of Wellington, 1947–1960
1961	1971	Norman Lesser	Bishop of Waiapu, 1947–1971
1972	1980	Allen Johnston	Bishop of Waikato, 1969–1980
1980	1985	Paul Reeves	Bishop of Auckland, 1979–1985; Governor-General of New Zealand, 1985–1990
1986	1997	Brian Davis	Bishop of Waikato, 1980–1986 (translated after Primatial election); Bishop of Wellington, 1986–1997
between Davis' resignation in ill-health (effective 1 July 1997) and the next General Synod (May 1998), Jabez Bryce, Bishop of Polynesia (as senior bishop by consecration) was Acting Primate.

== Primate with co-presiding bishops ==
The 53rd General Synod (1998) reduced the Primate's term from five General Synods (i.e. 10 years) to three (i.e. 6 years); removed the additional style "Archbishop" from the Primacy in favour of "Presiding Bishop"; and conferred the style "Co-Presiding Bishops / nga Pīhopa Aporei" on the Senior Bishops of the two tikanga besides the Primate's, while enjoining them to work closely with the Primate / te Pīhopa Mātāmua and Presiding Bishop.

The 2004 General Synod passed a further Primacy statute which: reinstated the honorific "Archbishop" (removing "Presiding Bishop") to the Primate; required the elected Primate to resign their other See(s); and, anticipating the coming changes, limited the next Primate's term to two years (renewable once). Whakahuihui Vercoe duly stepped down at the end of that two-year term as Primate in 2006, when the church decided that three bishops shall share the position and style of archbishop, each representing one of the three tikanga, or cultural streams of the church: Te Pīhopatanga o Aotearoa (the Bishopric of Aotearoa, serving Māori), the Dioceses in New Zealand (serving Pākehā), and the Diocese of Polynesia.

Primates / Pīhopa Mātāmua
From	Until	Incumbent	Notes
1998	2004	John Paterson	Bishop of Auckland, 1994–2010; Presiding Bishop
2004	2006	Whakahuihui Vercoe	Te Pīhopa o Aotearoa, 1981–2004; Archbishop (without another See)
Co-Presiding Bishops / Pīhopa Aporei
1998	2006	Jabez Bryce	Bishop of Polynesia, 1975–2010; Co-Presiding Bishop (Pasefika)
1998	2004	Whakahuihui Vercoe	Te Pīhopa o Aotearoa, 1981–2004; Pīhopa Aporei (Māori)
2004	2006	George Connor	Bishop in the Bay of Plenty, 1975–2005; Bishop of Dunedin, 2005–2009; Convening Bishop (NZ dioceses), 1998–2006; and Co-Presiding Bishop (Pākehā)
2005	2006	Brown Turei	Te Pīhopa o Te Tairāwhiti, 1992–2017; Te Pīhopa o Aotearoa, 2005–2017; Pīhopa Aporei (Māori)

== Shared primacy ==
Further changes to the office of primate were its limitation to a two-year term, to allow for greater participation in leadership, and its establishment as a triumvirate of bishops. For the transitional period between the decision at 2006 General Synod and the completion of the necessary legislation, Turei was Primate and Archbishop, and Moxon and Bryce his Co-Presiding Bishops; but they began to act as if co-equal primates, including use of "Archbishop" and the Most Reverend. Since 2008, Te Pīhopa o Aotearoa, the diocesan Bishop of Polynesia and the Senior Bishop of the New Zealand (i.e. tikanga Pākehā) Dioceses have each — co-equally — been ex officio Primate and Archbishop; each one is elected by a body representing their whole tikanga. Te Hīnota Whānui/General Synod 2020 reaffirmed the three-tikanga and co-primacy arrangements.

Primates / Pīhopa Mātāmua
From	Until	Incumbent	Notes
2006	2017	Brown Turei	Te Pīhopa o Te Tairāwhiti, 1992–2017; Te Pīhopa o Aotearoa, 2005–2017; sole Primate and Archbishop, until 2008; retirement announced for 31 March; died in office
2006	2010	Jabez Bryce	Bishop of Polynesia, 1975–2010; Co-Presiding Bishop, 2006–2008
2006	April 2013	David Moxon	Bishop of Waikato, 1993–2013; Senior Bishop of the New Zealand dioceses, 2006–2013; Co-Presiding Bishop, 2006–2008
2010	2018	Winston Halapua	Bishop of Polynesia, 2010–2018
1 May 2013	2023	Philip Richardson	Bishop of Taranaki, since 2008; Bishop of Waikato and Taranaki, since 2018; Senior Bishop of the New Zealand Dioceses, 2013–2023
7 April 2018	present	Don Tamihere	Te Pīhopa o Aotearoa, since 2017; Te Pīhopa o Te Tairāwhiti, since 2017
2019	2021	Fereimi Cama	Bishop of Polynesia from 2019–2021, died in office.
2023	present	Sione Uluʻilakepa	Bishop of Polynesia, 2023–present (nominated November 2022; sanctioned December; and consecrated 11 March 2023)
2024	present	Justin Duckworth	Bishop of Wellington, since 2012; Senior Bishop of the New Zealand Dioceses, since 2024
