= Sione Uluʻilakepa =

Tongan Anglican bishop (born 1965

The Most Reverend Sione Uluʻilakepa
- Bishop of Polynesia; Archbishop and Primate of the Anglican Church in Aotearoa, New Zealand and Polynesia
- Church: Anglican Church in Aotearoa, New Zealand and Polynesia
- Diocese: Polynesia
- In office: 2023–present
- Predecessor: Fereimi Cama

Orders
- Ordination: 1992 by Jabez Bryce
- Consecration: 11 March 2023 by Don Tamihere and Philip Richardson

Personal details
- Born: 1965 (age 60–61) Nukuʻalofa, Tonga

Sione Silongo Uluʻilakepa (born 1965) is a Tongan Anglican bishop. Since 2023, he has been bishop of Polynesia and thus simultaneously serving as one of three co-equal primates of the Anglican Church in Aotearoa, New Zealand and Polynesia in the Anglican Communion.

== Early life and education ==
Uluʻilakepa was born in Nukuʻalofa in 1965. He was raised in a "staunchly Anglican" family and attended St Andrew's Anglican High School in Tonga. At 20, he received a call to ordained ministry and studied at St John the Baptist Theological College in Suva, St John's College, Morpeth, in Australia, Pacific Theological College in Fiji and St John's College and the University of Auckland in New Zealand. He married Taina, and they had two children.

== Ordained ministry ==
In 1992, Bishop Jabez Bryce ordained him to the priesthood at St Paul's Anglican Church in Nukuʻalofa. Uluʻilakepa served parishes in Haʻapai, Tonga; Pago Pago, American Samoa; and Apia, Samoa, before he moved in 1995 to become assistant priest at Holy Trinity Cathedral in Suva.

He returned to Tonga in 2000 to become a parish vicar, a ministry trainer and a chaplain and later principal at St Andrew's. Starting in 2013, Uluʻilakepa became a ministry educator in the diocese. From 2018 to 2023, he was principal of St John the Baptist Theological College. He also worked as a Common Life Liturgical Commissioner, in which capacity he sought to blend Polynesian traditions and symbols into Anglican liturgies and helped to translate eucharistic liturgies into Polynesian languages as part of a revision of the New Zealand Prayer Book.

In December 2022, Uluʻilakepa was elected bishop of Polynesia in succession to Fereimi Cama, who had died in office in 2021. He was consecrated by the ACANZP co-primates Philip Richardson and Don Tamihere in March 2023 in a service at Holy Trinity Cathedral. In attendance were Fijian president Wiliame Katonivere and his wife. As bishop of Polynesia, Uluʻilakepa serves automatically as a co-primate of the church with the title and style of an archbishop.

Anglican Communion titles
Preceded by Fereimi Cama	Bishop of Polynesia; Since 2023	Incumbent
