= Diocese of Polynesia =

Anglican diocese in Polynesia

Coordinates: 18°8′32.61″S 178°25′28.09″E

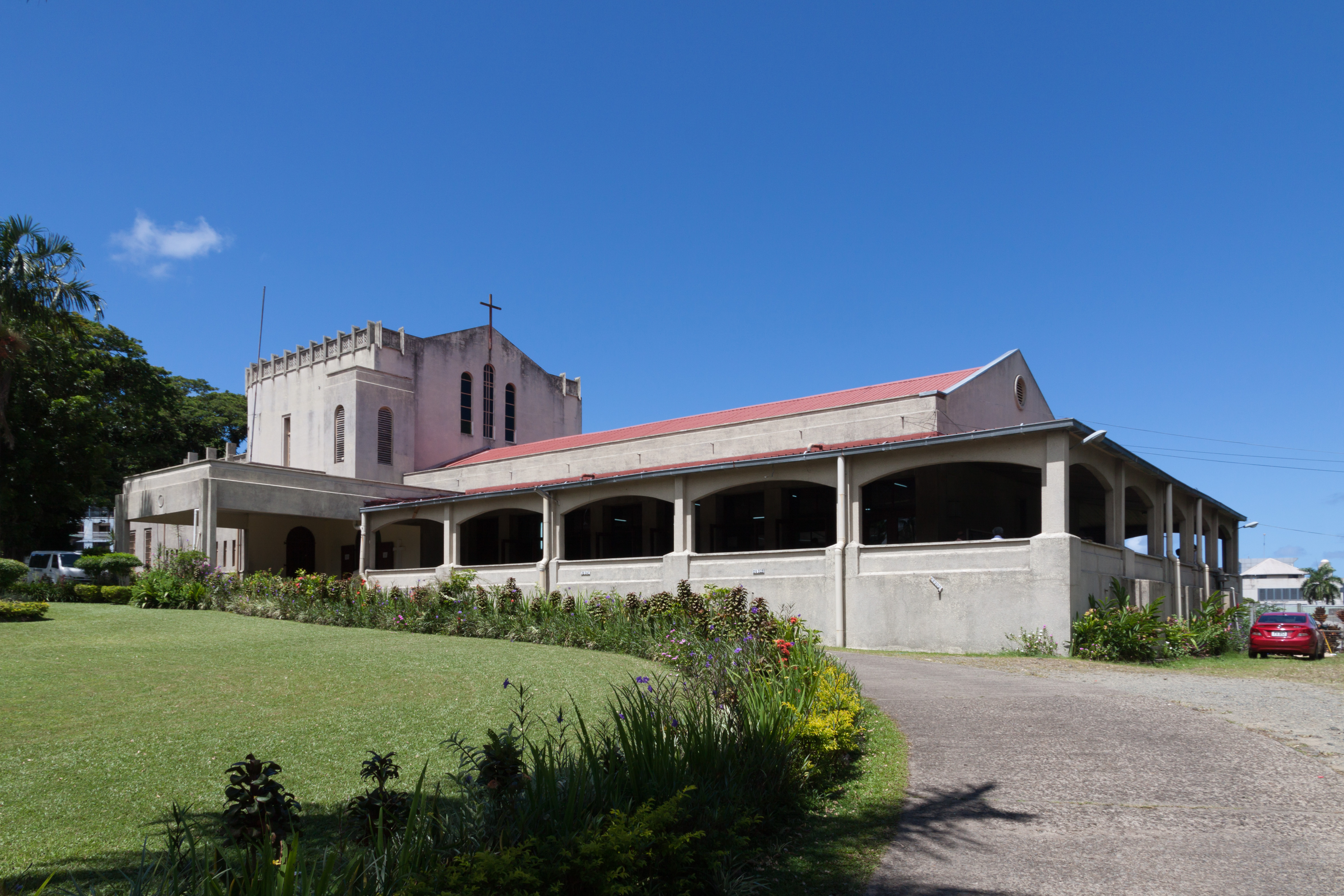
- Holy Trinity Cathedral in Suva

- Coat of arms of the Diocese of Polynesia

Location
- Country: Fiji, Tonga, Samoa, American Samoa

Information
- Cathedral: Holy Trinity Cathedral, Suva

Current leadership
- Parent church: Anglican Church in Aotearoa, New Zealand and Polynesia
- Bishop and co-primate: Sione Uluʻilakepa
- Assistant bishops: Gabriel Sharma (Viti Levu West); Henry Bull (Vanua Levu and Taveuni)
- Dean: Orisi Vuki
- Archdeacons: Famausili Chris Solomona; Taimalelagi Fagamalama Tuatagaloa-Leota; Kensington Fifita; Henry Rogo; Orisi Vuki; Henry Manulevu

Website
- www.anglican.org.nz/Directory/Diocese-of-Polynesia/Diocese-of-Polynesia

The Diocese of Polynesia, or the Tikanga Pasefika serves Anglicans in Fiji, Tonga, Samoa, Aotearoa New Zealand and the Cook Islands, within the Anglican Church in Aotearoa, New Zealand and Polynesia. The diocese's first bishop was consecrated in 1908. The diocese's cathedral is Holy Trinity Cathedral in Suva, Fiji.

Polynesia is a diocese, and its Bishop is automatically accorded the style archbishop and the formal prefix Most Reverend. Under the model of leadership adopted by the Anglican Church in New Zealand, the Bishop of Polynesia is automatically one of the three primates and archbishops. Each of these three is metropolitan archbishop to his respective tikanga, share the primacy and can serve in the one position held for the province on the international Anglican Communion Primates' Meeting.

On November 18, 2026 the Diocese of Polynesia and the Anglican Church of Melanesia signed a memorandum on understanding on seminary partnerships and shared support for the Melanesian Commission.

== Bishops ==
=== Bishops of Polynesia ===
- 1908–1921: Clayton Twitchell
- 1922–1962: Stanley Kempthorne
- 1962–1968: John Vockler
- 1969–1975: John Holland
- 1975–2010: Jabez Bryce (also: Acting Primate of New Zealand, 1997–1998; Co-Presiding Bishop / Pīhopa Aporei (Pasefika), 1998 2008; Primate / Pīhopa Mātāmua and Archbishop, 2008 onwards)
- 2010–2018: Winston Halapua (also Primate / Pīhopa Mātāmua and Archbishop)
- 2019–2021 (d.): Fereimi Cama (also Primate / Pīhopa Mātāmua and Archbishop)
- 2023–present: Sione Uluʻilakepa (also Primate / Pīhopa Mātāmua and Archbishop; nominated November 2022; sanctioned December; and consecrated 11 March 2023)

=== Suffragan bishops ===
Anglicanism first came to Samoa around 1890; in 1897, Alfred Willis, Bishop of Honolulu, visited Apia to baptise eight and confirm eleven people; he retired to Tonga in 1902 and was licensed assistant bishop in Tonga by Twitchell in 1913.

On 27 August 1967, Fine Halapua was consecrated a bishop, to serve as an assistant bishop of the diocese and called suffragan Bishop of Nukuʻalofa; he retired at the end of 1977. On Lady Day (25 March) 1994, Viliami Halaʻapiʻapi was consecrated Assistant Bishop of the diocese; called Father Bill, he died in office in early 2003.

Between 2004 and 2006, the diocese created six "units": three Episcopal Units (i.e. led by bishops) and three Archdeaconry Units (i.e. led by archdeacons). By 2006 these were: Northern (the Bishop in Vanua Levu and Taveuni); Vitu Levu West; and the Archdeaconries of Suva & Ovalau, of Tonga, of Samoa, and of American Samoa; the diocese's Episcopal Units Act 2008 founded three units: in Vanua Levu and Taveuni, in Viti Levu West and in New Zealand.

On 10 April 2005, three assistant bishops were consecrated for the diocese: Halapua, who served Polynesians in mainland New Zealand until 2010; Apimeleki Qiliho, Bishop in Vanua Levu and Taveuni (until 2017), in Viti Levu West (2014–2017), and an Assistant Bishop (2017–18); and Gabriel Sharma, Bishop in Viti Levu West (until 2013 and again 2017–present).

On 17 September 2017, 'Afa Vaka was consecrated a bishop; he served as "Bishop in Tonga", overseeing the newly constituted episcopal area; he retired effective 23 July 2019. Henry Bull was consecrated bishop on 3 December 2017 to serve as bishop in Vanua Levu and Taveuni.

== Other notable people ==
- Taimalelagi Fagamalama Tuatagaloa-Leota, also known as Archdeacon Tai.
- The Reverend Sereima Loimaloma
