= Louise Dean =

Louise Dean may refer to:

- Louise Dean (author), British novelist
- Louise Dean (singer) (1971–1995), British singer with House band Shiva
- Louise Deans, New Zealand Anglican priest
