= Api Qiliho =

Apimeleki Nadoki Qiliho is an indigenous Fijian from the province of Nadroga-Navosa in the Fiji Islands and a retired Anglican bishop.

Consecrated a bishop on 10 April 2005, he became "Bishop in Vanua Levu and Taveuni" in the Diocese of Polynesia (Anglican Church in Aotearoa, New Zealand and Polynesia) — he made church history by becoming the first indigenous Fijian bishop in that church. He was one of three suffragan (assistant) bishops (consecrated the same day) who served under the diocesan Bishop of Polynesia (then Jabez Bryce) — the diocese covers Fiji, Samoa, Tonga and the Cook Islands. After his comrade Gabriel Sharma resigned as Bishop in Viti Levu West, Qiliho also took that role from 2014 onwards; in 2017, he became (instead) Assistant Bishop of the diocese, until his retirement in August 2018.

== Background ==
Qiliho comes from the village of Rukurukulevu in the district of Cuvu in Nadroga, located in Fiji's Western Division. He then spent some time living in Lautoka, the capital of the Western Division, at which time he changed denomination from being Methodist to an Anglican. He then decided to become a priest and eventually was made a bishop after serving for some time as the vicar general at Holy Trinity Cathedral in Suva. Apimeleki Qiliho lives in Labasa on Vanua Levu and is currently married to Taomi Tapu Qiliho. He was previously married to Litiana Rika, who died in 1997. He has four children and eight grandchildren.

== Career ==
Qiliho began training to be an Anglican priest in the early 1960s and during the course of his training stayed in Suva and Hamilton, New Zealand. After becoming a priest he had postings to parishes around Fiji, such as in Levuka. He then went on to become Vicar General under Bishop Jabez Bryce and then Bishop of Vanua Levu and Taveuni. He also has served on many church and non-church organisations, such as the Pacific Council of Churches and the Fiji Council of Churches, and was the president of the Pacific/Fiji Bible Society. He also does work with certain AIDS, youth and non-governmental organisations in Fiji and the region.
