= Stanley Kempthorne =

New Zealand Anglican bishop (1886–1963

The Right Reverend Stanley Kempthorne CBE
- Bishop of Polynesia
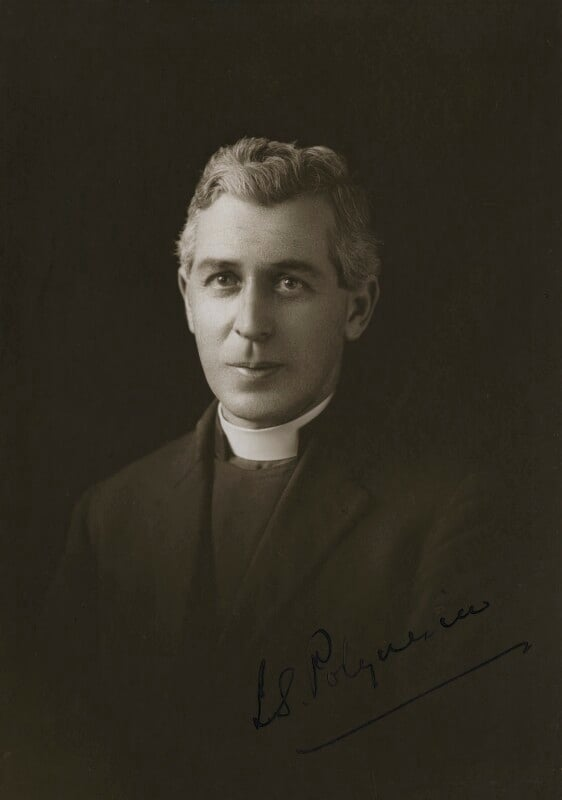
- Kempthorne, c. 1920s
- Church: Church of the Province of New Zealand
- Diocese: Polynesia
- In office: 1922–1962
- Predecessor: Clayton Twitchell
- Successor: John Vockler

Orders
- Ordination: 1914 (priesthood)
- Consecration: 1922

Personal details
- Born: Leonard Stanley Kempthorne; 2 August 1886 New Zealand
- Died: July 25, 1963 (aged 76)
- Education: Nelson College; The Queen's College, Oxford

Leonard Stanley Kempthorne CBE (2 August 1886 – 25 July 1963) was a New Zealand Anglican priest who served as Bishop of Polynesia from 1922 to 1962.

Born into a Kiwi ecclesiastical family, Kempthorne was educated at Nelson College from 1900 to 1903, and at The Queen's College, Oxford. He was ordained in 1914. He worked for 18 months at Zaria in Northern Nigeria before a four-year stint as Chaplain to the Bishop of Lichfield. He was then Chaplain at Ipoh (Diocese of Singapore) in the Federated Malay States from 1920 to 1922 when he was appointed Bishop of Polynesia, a post he held for forty years.

== Notes ==
Religious titles
Preceded by Thomas Clayton Twitchell	Bishop of Polynesia; 1922–1962	Succeeded by John Charles Vockler
