= Patricia Allan =

New Zealand nurse and Anglican vicar

The Reverend Patricia Allan ONZM
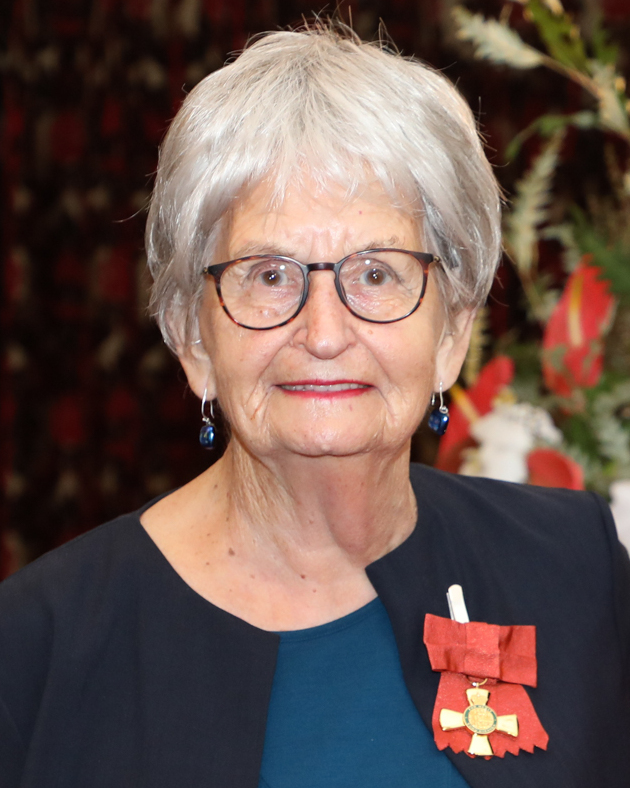
- Allan in 2026
- Born: Patricia Ann Robinson; 1938 (age 87–88); Te Awamutu, New Zealand
- Awards: New Zealand Suffrage Centennial Medal 1993

Academic background
- Education: University of Canterbury
- Thesis: The Once and Future Cathedral (2017)
- Doctoral advisor: Lyndon A. Fraser

Patricia Ann Allan ONZM (née Robinson; born 1938) is a New Zealand vicar and advocate for survivors of sexual abuse. Originally trained as a nurse, she was one of the first Anglican women to be ordained in New Zealand. Allan conducted research into the handling of sexual abuse complaints in the Anglican Church. In the 2026 New Year Honours, Allan was appointed an Officer of the New Zealand Order of Merit, for services to survivors of abuse.

== Life ==
Allan was born in Te Awamutu, and moved to Hokitika as a ten-year-old child. She attended Christchurch West High School. Allan worked as a nurse for twenty-five years, and then in 1987 was one of the first New Zealand women to be ordained in the Anglican Church. She was the first female vicar on the West Coast of New Zealand.

Allan became known for challenging the systematic failure of the Anglican Church of New Zealand to deal with historic and ongoing abuse. Allan worked as an ACC-registered counsellor, through which she began working with survivors of sexual abuse. In 1989 Allan led the Ordained Women's Conference, where emerging issues of sexual harassment were first raised, and in 1992 received a scholarship to study how the American Episcopal Church was dealing with abuse. She later helped five women, including her friend Louise Deans, to make a formal complaint against an abusive Anglican priest, but described this later as "a bad career move". Allan reported that the church protected the priest and laid the blame on the complainants, and in 1997 she lost her job as the diocesan mission coordinator for Christchurch. Allan encouraged the Anglican Church to adopt policies and procedures for dealing with professional misconduct, complaints of sexual abuse and clergy education, and successfully lobbied for the removal of an abuser's name from the New Zealand Prayer Book.

In 2017, Allan completed a PhD in anthropology titled The Once and Future Cathedral at the University of Canterbury, focusing on the earthquake-damaged Christ Church Cathedral. From 2018, Allan conducted post-doctoral research into the handling of sexual abuse complaints in the Anglican Church over a thirty-year period. Her research was subpoenaed by the Royal Commission into Historical Abuse in State Care and in the Care of Faith-Based Institutions, and she gave evidence to the commission, as well as supporting survivors to give their testimony.

== Honours and awards ==
In 1993 Allan was awarded a New Zealand Suffrage Centennial Medal. The medal was given to people who had made a significant contribution to women's rights or women's issues in New Zealand.

In the 2026 New Year Honours, Allan was appointed an Officer of the New Zealand Order of Merit, for services to survivors of abuse.
