= John Vockler =

Australian bishop

The Most Reverend John Vockler
- Archbishop emeritus of the Anglican Catholic Church, Bishop emeritus of the Diocese of New Orleans
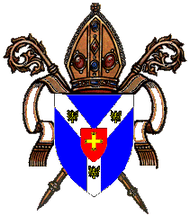
- Coat of arms of Archbishop Brother John Charles Vockler, Metropolitan of the Original Province of the Anglican Catholic Church 2001-2005
- Church: Anglican Catholic Church
- In office: 2001-2005
- Successor: Mark Haverland
- Other posts: Assistant Bishop of Adelaide, Bishop of Polynesia (Anglican Communion), Assistant Bishop of Chelmsford, Assistant Bishop of Southwark

Orders
- Ordination: 1948
- Consecration: 1959

Personal details
- Born: July 22, 1924 Sydney, Australia
- Died: February 6, 2014 (aged 89)

John Charles Vockler FODC (22 July 1924 – 6 February 2014) was an Australian bishop and Franciscan friar. He was originally a bishop in the Anglican Church of Australia but later become the primate of the Anglican Catholic Church, a Continuing Anglican church.

Vockler was educated at the University of Adelaide and trained for ordination at St John's College, Morpeth. He was ordained as an Anglican priest in 1948. He was an assistant priest at Christ Church Cathedral, Newcastle, then vice-warden of St John's College, University of Queensland. After a short time in New York he was a lecturer in theology at St John's Theological College, Morpeth, New South Wales. Later he was Archdeacon of the Eyre Peninsula and an assistant bishop in the Diocese of Adelaide: he was consecrated a bishop on November 30, 1959. In 1963 he became the Bishop of Polynesia, a post he held for five years. He served as an Assistant Bishop of Chelmsford from 1972 until 1974, and Assistant Bishop of Southwark from 1974 to 1975. After moving to the United States he was initially an assistant bishop in the Episcopal Diocese of Quincy. He was a candidate for bishop of the Episcopal Diocese of Long Island in 1987.

After resigning as Bishop of Polynesia in 1968, he was professed as an Anglican Franciscan friar (as Brother John-Charles) and made life profession in 1975. In 1981 he transferred to the American Province and became a friar resident at the Little Portion Friary on Long Island. He later became a member of the more conservative Franciscan Order of the Divine Compassion.

He was received into the Anglican Catholic Church in 1994, and he initially resided at Holyrood Seminary in Liberty, New York, as the Sub-Dean for Academic Affairs.

He was appointed bishop of the Anglican Catholic Church's Diocese of New Orleans in 2001 in succession to Dean Stephens who had died suddenly earlier that year. He was the archbishop of the Anglican Catholic Church from 2001 to 2005. He retired as both archbishop of the ACC and Bishop of New Orleans in 2005 and moved to his native Australia.

As an author he wrote several books, including Can Anglicans Believe Anything: The Nature and Spirit of Anglicanism, One Man’s Journey (1972); and Two Paths to Holiness.

Vockler died peacefully at his home in Australia, early in the morning of the old Feast of St. Titus, on 6 February 2014.

== Notes ==
Anglican Communion titles
Preceded by Stanley Kempthorne	Bishop of Polynesia; 1962–1968	Succeeded by John Tristram Holland

Anglican Catholic Church titles
Preceded by John T Cahoon, Jnr.	Metropolitan Original Province; 2001–2005	Succeeded by Mark Haverland
Preceded by Dean Stephens	Bishop Ordinary of Diocese of New Orleans; 2001-2005	Succeeded by Presley Hutchens
