= Gabriel Sharma =

Fijian bishop

Gabriel Sharma is an Anglican Bishop in Fiji. On 1 May 2005, he became the first Indo-Fijian to be consecrated as an Anglican Bishop, the first ethnic Indian Bishop in the Province of Aotearoa, of which Fiji forms a part, and the first Bishop specifically assigned to Fiji's Western Division, when he was installed as Bishop of Viti Levu West. On 10 April 2005, in a service at Suva's Holy Trinity Cathedral, he was consecrated together with Apimeleki Qiliho, who became Bishop of Vanua Levu, and Dr Winston Halapua, who was installed as Bishop of the Diocese of Polynesia, which covers New Zealand. He resigned his See in 2013, but returned in 2017.

== Family background ==
Sharma, who hails from a farming family in the village of Korokoro in Nadroga-Navosa Province, was raised as a Hindu but converted to Christianity after meeting Ana, whom he married in 1985.

Sharma studied in Auckland, earning a Bachelor and Master's degree in theology. His master's thesis was on the prevention of family violence.

== View on the 2006 coup ==
After the 2006 coup, Sharma told Anglicans in Sydney that Fijian Christians were praying especially that no one would be harmed. He said that the majority of Fijians believed that the coup was illegal, but that a silent minority thought that the coup was "the only thing that could have happened." He called on the outside world to try to understand the situation. "We have heard a number of negative remarks [about the situation in Fiji], but this will not help the people," he said.

Sharma said that many churchgoers in his region had been laid off as hotel visits had slumped. He said that many people were still hopeful for a democratic resolution, but requested that Sydney Anglicans continued to pray.
