= Mark Haverland =

American Continuing Anglican bishop (born 1956)

The Most Reverend Mark Haverland
- Archbishop and Metropolitan of the Anglican Catholic Church, Bishop Ordinary of the Diocese of the South
- Church: Anglican Catholic Church
- Province: Original Province
- Diocese: Diocese of the South
- In office: Diocese of South 1998 - Provincial Archbishop 2005-present
- Predecessor: John Vockler

Orders
- Ordination: 1982 by James Orin Mote
- Consecration: 1998 by Michael Dean Stephens

Personal details
- Born: December 4, 1956 (age 69) Youngstown, United States

Mark David Haverland (born December 4, 1956) is an American Continuing Anglican bishop. He is the archbishop and metropolitan of the Anglican Catholic Church (ACC).

He studied at Kenyon College, earned his MA at Duquesne University and earned his PhD at Duke University. His dissertation was about Anglican theologian Henry Hammond. He received a Richard Weaver Fellowship from the Intercollegiate Studies Institute and a James B. Duke Fellowship from Duke University.

He was ordained a deacon in 1981 and a priest June 5, 1981. He served in several Anglican Catholic parishes in Pennsylvania, North Carolina and Georgia, spending most of his priest career at St. Stephen's Parish, in Athens, Georgia where he was founding Rector (1982–2007).

In 1995, he wrote an essay, "What is Anglicanism?", in which he defined the ACC not as "Continuing Anglican" or "Anglo-Catholic" but as an Anglican church committed to Apostolic succession, the first seven ecumenical councils, and seven sacraments. This was repeated in a 2010 essay, in which Haverland posited that the ACC was governed by the Affirmation of St. Louis, and to a lesser extent the Henrician Settlement and the modifications to the Henrician Settlement as expressed in the Constitution and Canons of the ACC.

Haverland was elected and consecrated bishop ordinary of the Diocese of the South on January 31, 1998, succeeding the deceased William Lewis. Then only age 41, he was the youngest bishop of the Anglican Catholic Church. The chief consecrator was the metropolitan, the Most Rev'd Michael Dean Stephens, with the Right Rev'd John T. Cahoon Jr. (Mid Atlantic States) and the Right Rev'd Victor Manuel Cruz-Blanco (New Granada) as Co-consecrators. Joining in with the laying on of hands were the Rt. Rev'd James Bromley (Australia), the Rt. Rev'd Joseph P. Deyman (Midwest), and the Rt. Rev'd James O. Mote (Holy Trinity, retired). He would be elected and enthroned as archbishop and metropolitan of the Anglican Catholic Church at their 16th provincial synod, held in Grand Rapids, Michigan, to replace the retired John Vockler in 2005. He has remained as bishop ordinary of the Diocese of the South.

In his inaugural charge to the synod, the newly elected metropolitan cited the stability and consensus of the ACC as its strengths, and called for greater openness to the wider tradition outside classical Anglicanism, including the Orthodox and Roman Catholic churches.

On August 22, 2006, he offered the keynote address to the Fellowship of Concerned Churchmen on the question "What does conservative Anglicanism have to contribute to the One Holy Catholic and Apostolic Church?"

He responded critically to Pope Benedict XVI's Anglicanorum Coetibus, in a document issued in January 2010, despite recognizing positive aspects in the provision. In 2011, he addressed the Congress of Traditional Anglicans, and stated that the Affirmation of St. Louis is consistent with classical Anglican theology while also offering the basis for union with eastern and western churches.

In 2015, he addressed ACNA and Forward in Faith North America, stating that the Affirmation of St. Louis "situates us irrevocably within the central Tradition of Catholic Christendom" and that it is that which is "the lens through which we read and appropriate our Anglicanism".

He has collaborated on many publications, including Touchstone, The New Oxford Review and The Journal of Religion. He wrote Anglican Catholic Faith and Practice, first published in 1996 by Holyrood Seminary Press, and republished in a revised edition in 2004. and now in its 3rd edition, revised and updated, Third Printing (2011).

In addition to his academic publications on bioethics, he is a signatory of the Statement Opposing Brain Death Criteria released by Citizens United Resisting Euthanasia.

He has appeared multiple times as a guest on the podcast The Sacramentalists in 2021 to discuss universalism, and again in 2023 to speak on the subject of Mariology and the Book of Ruth.

He publishes his own blog, Anglican Catholic Liturgy and Theology, with the disclaimer that it "should not be considered official or authoritative" for the ACC. As the Metropolitan of the ACC he publishes a regular column in its official news publication, The Trinitarian.

== Bibliography ==
- Haverland, Mark. Anglican Catholic Faith and Practice. Athens, Ga: Anglican Parishes Association, 2004. Abstract: This book provides a succinct, yet thorough introduction to orthodox Anglican belief.--Cover p. [4]. Contents: Authority in the Church—The Bible—Church history—The sacraments and worship—The moral teaching of the Church—Appendix A: The Church—Appendix B: The three creeds and the articles—Appendix C: The papacy—Appendix D: The final things and the communion of saints.
- Haverland, Mark. 2013. "From the Last Issue: A Response to David Curry." Anglican Way, Spring 2013, 3.
- Haverland, Mark. 2012. "Passive Obedience and Caroline Politics. III." SKCM News, June 2012, 55–65.
- Haverland, Mark. 2011. "Passive Obedience and Caroline Politics. II." SKCM News, December 2011, 33–36.
- Haverland, Mark. 2011. "Passive Obedience and Caroline Politics. I." SKCM News, June 2011, 34–43.
- Haverland, Mark. 2010. "An Introduction to Henry Hammond 1605‐1660" SKCM News, June 2010, 27–31.
- Haverland, Mark. 2003. "Book Review: Literature and Religious Culture in Seventeenth-Century England". The Journal of Religion. 83, no. 2: 285–286.
- Haverland, M. 2000. The Moment of Death and the Morally Safer Path. In: Beyond Brain Death. Philosophy and Medicine, vol 66. Springer, Dordrecht. https://doi.org/10.1007/0-306-46882-4_10
- Haverland, Mark. 1995. "Classical Anglican Moral Theology: Unavoidably Non-Ecumenical." Christian Bioethics 1, no. 2 (1995): 200–12. PMID 11654507; doi:10.1093/cb/1.2.200
- Haverland, Mark David. 1989. The Practique Divinity of Henry Hammond, 1605–1660. 1990. Ph.D. thesis, Duke University.
- Haverland, Mark David. 1981 "So Many and so Godly Ages": The Idea of Tradition in Richard Hooker. 1984. Master thesis Duquesne University.
- Haverland, Mark D. 1978. Locke and Christianity: The Predicament of the Christian Citizen of a Lockean Society. [Gambier, Ohio]: [publisher not identified], Notes: Typewritten. Honors thesis—Kenyon.

Anglican Catholic Church titles
| Preceded by John Vockler | Metropolitan Original Province; 2005–present | Succeeded by |
| Preceded by William O. Lewis | Bishop Ordinary Diocese of the South; 1998–present | Succeeded by |
