= Clayton Twitchell =

English Anglican bishop

Thomas Clayton Twitchell (1864 – 9 October 1947) was an English Anglican bishop in the 20th century. He was educated at King's College London and ordained in 1889. His first posts were curacies at St George's, Barrow-in-Furness and St Peter's, Cranley Gardens. From 1903 to 1908 he was Vicar of All Hallows East India Docks when he was appointed Bishop of Polynesia a post he held for 13 years. He was consecrated a bishop on Ascension Day 1908 (28 May), by Randall Davidson, Archbishop of Canterbury, at Southwark Cathedral. On his return to England he was Rector of St Margaret, Buxted and then of St Peter's Selsey. A Fellow of King's College, London he died on 9 October 1947.

Religious titles
New title	Bishop in Polynesia; 1908–1921	Succeeded by Stanley Kempthorne
