= Winston Halapua =

Winston Halapua (born 1945) is a Tongan-born Fijian retired Anglican bishop and academic.

Consecrated a bishop on 10 April 2005, he served as suffragan/assistant bishop of the Diocese of Polynesia, for Polynesians in mainland New Zealand until 2010, when he became diocesan bishop of that Diocese. In becoming Bishop of Polynesia, he automatically became Senior Bishop of Tikanga Pasefika and therefore Archbishop of New Zealand & Primate of the Anglican Church in Aotearoa, New Zealand and Polynesia (one of three co-equal incumbents). On his retirement in August 2018, he was granted the honorary title "archbishop emeritus".

== Selected works ==
- Halapua, Winston (2001). Living on the fringe: Melanesians in Fiji. Suva: Institute of Pacific Studies. ISBN 978-9820203150.
- Halapua, Winston (2003). Tradition, Lotu & Militarism in Fiji. Fiji: Institute of Applied Studies. ISBN 978-9823010212.
- Halapua, Winston (2008). Waves of God's embrace: sacred perspectives from the ocean. London: Canterbury Press. ISBN 978-1853119224.
- Halapua, Winston (2010). The role of militarism in the politics of Fiji. Saarbrucken, Germany: VDM Verlag Dr. Müller. ISBN 978-3639280647.
