= Jabez Bryce =

Jabez Leslie Bryce (January 1935 – February 11, 2010) was a Tongan-born Anglican bishop. He was the Bishop of Polynesia in the Province of New Zealand, which includes most of the South Pacific. He served from 1975 until his death in 2010. He was elevated to Archepiscopacy of the diocese in 2006.

Bryce was the first Pacific Islander to become an Anglican bishop. At the time of his death in 2010, he was the longest serving bishop in the worldwide Anglican Communion.

Bryce was born in Vavaʻu, Tonga. He was raised in Samoa and trained for the Anglican ministry in Auckland, New Zealand.

He was named the Bishop of the Diocese of Polynesia in 1975 and consecrated a bishop, presented and installed on 11 May 1975. He was based in Suva, Fiji, where he lived for more than 50 years.

As bishop, Bryce advocated for a number of causes affecting the Pacific Islands region. During the 1970s, Bryce became a leading opponent of French nuclear testing in Mururoa Atoll, French Polynesia. More recently, Bryce spoke out strongly against both the 2000 and 2006 coups.

He was a member of the Pacific Conference of Churches. He also served within the World Council of Churches as the president of the Pacificregion. Bryce became the Archbishop and Co-presiding Bishop from 2006. In 2008, he became the Primate, of Tikanga Pasefika, of the Anglican Church in Aotearoa, New Zealand and Polynesia.

Bryce died on 11 February 2010, in Suva, Fiji, after a short illness.

== Honours ==
National honours

- Order of the Crown of Tonga, Grand Cross (31 July 2008).
