= Fereimi Cama =

Anglican bishop (1955–2021)

Fereimi Cama (2 March 1955 – 2 July 2021) was an Anglican bishop. He was the first Fijian to be Bishop of Polynesia in the diocese's history.

Cama was born on 2 March 1955 in the Fijian village of Nukuni, Ono-i-Lau. He was raised a Methodist but became an Anglican in 1987. He became a lay reader and then studied for ordination. He eventually rose to be Dean of Holy Trinity Cathedral, Suva. Cama died in the Colonial War Memorial Hospital, Suva, on 2 July 2021.
