= Louise Deans =

New Zealand Anglican priest and whistleblower

Louise Deans MNZM
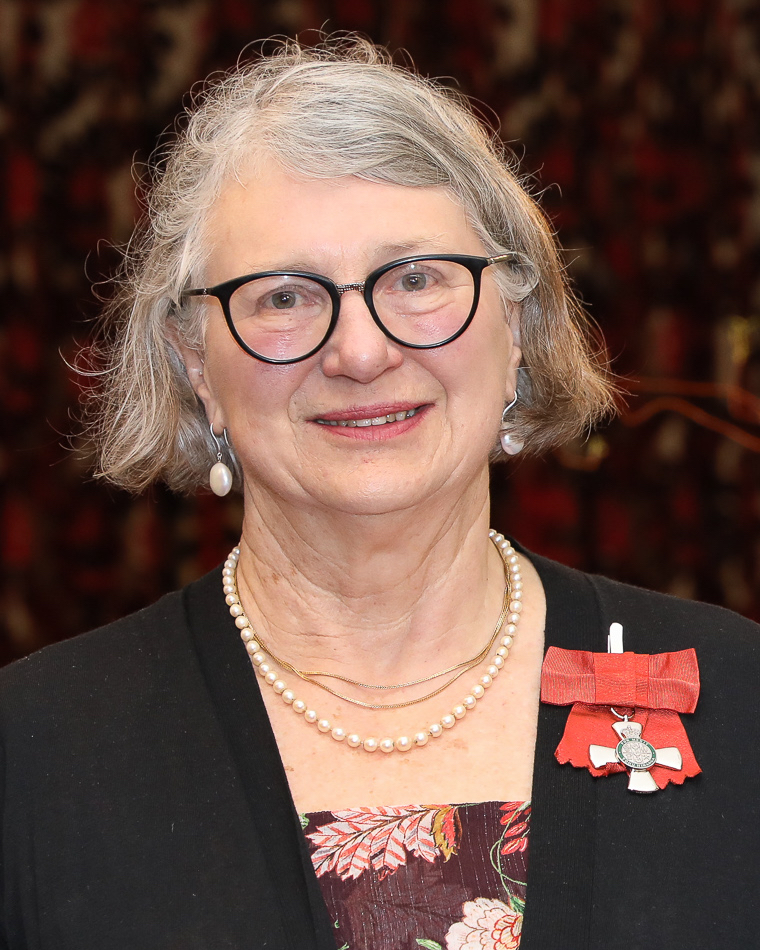
- Deans in 2022
- Other names: Louise Margaret Thodey
- Awards: New Zealand Suffrage Centennial Medal 1993, Member of the New Zealand Order of Merit

Louise Margaret Deans MNZM (née Thodey) is a New Zealand Anglican priest, who published a book about her abuse within the church during her ordination training. In 2022 Deans was appointed a Member of the New Zealand Order of Merit for services to the community and women.

== Personal life ==
Deans was married to James Deans (died 2014), of Homebush Homestead, descendant of pioneer John Deans. The Deans lived at Homebush, and were upstairs when the 2010 Canterbury earthquake hit and damaged the house beyond repair. The historic house was subsequently demolished, but they chose to rebuild it. Deans formed the Homebush Stables Historical Society in 1992, and restored the stables.

== Ordination ==
Deans earned three theology degrees from the University of Otago, and is an ordained Anglican priest. During her training in the 1980s and 1990s, she was supervised by bishop Rob McCullough, who was Principal of College House in Christchurch. McCullough sexually assaulted and harassed Deans, and when she started talking to other women she discovered 35 others who had also been abused by McCullough. A vicar she talked to told Deans to keep quiet about the abuse, so she waited until she was ordained to make an official complaint. Deans and three other female priests made written complaints to the Church about McCullough in September 1989, but were told their complaints were "unsubstantiated". Deans published her book Whistle Blower: Abuse of Power in the Church – a New Zealand Story in 2001, recounting her experiences and the church's subsequent actions. Deans and "several" other women received payouts from the church in 2003, but Deans described later that there was still "absolute denial and no acknowledgement". Giving evidence to the Royal Commission of Inquiry into Abuse in Care in 2020, Deans said the church had tried to have sections of her book amended, and prevent her from presenting some of her evidence to the Commission of Inquiry. McCullough died in 2023. Deans and other women later received a formal apology from the Anglican Church and resettlement agreements, as well as changed procedures for complaints. Her book is compulsory reading for ministers' training at St John's Theological College.

Deans was elected to Selwyn District Council in 1989 and served until 1995. She also served on the committee of the Rural Women’s Stepping Out programme.

== Honours and awards ==
In 1993 Deans was awarded a New Zealand Suffrage Centennial Medal. The medal was given to people who had made a significant contribution to women's rights or women's issues in New Zealand.

In the 2022 Queens Birthday and Platinum Jubilee Honours Deans was appointed a Member of the New Zealand Order of Merit for services to the community and women.

== Published works ==
- Deans, Louise (2001). Whistle Blower: Abuse of Power in the Church – a New Zealand Story. Auckland, N.Z.: Tandem Press. ISBN 1877178780.
