= Anglican Church in Aotearoa, New Zealand and Polynesia =

Church of the Anglican Communion

- Te Hāhi Mihinare ki Aotearoa ki Niu Tīreni, ki Ngā Moutere o Te Moana Nui a Kiwa
- Classification: Protestant (with various theological and doctrinal identities, including Anglo-Catholic and Evangelical)
- Orientation: Anglican
- Scripture: Holy Bible
- Theology: Anglican doctrine
- Polity: Episcopal
- Primates: Don Tamihere (Aotearoa); Justin Duckworth (New Zealand); Sione Uluʻilakepa (Polynesia)
- Dioceses: 13
- Parishes: 552 (2008)
- Region: New Zealand, Fiji, Tonga, Samoa, and the Cook Islands
- Headquarters: Meadowbank, Auckland, New Zealand
- Separations: Church of Confessing Anglicans of Aotearoa/New Zealand (2019)
- Members: 469,036 total members (2024)
- Official website: anglican.org.nz

The Anglican Church in Aotearoa, New Zealand and Polynesia, (Note: Māori: Te Hāhi Mihinare ki Aotearoa ki Niu Tīreni, ki Ngā Moutere o te Moana Nui a Kiwa) formerly the Church of the Province of New Zealand, is a province of the Anglican Communion serving New Zealand, Fiji, Tonga, Samoa, and the Cook Islands. Since 1992 the church has consisted of three tikanga or cultural streams: Aotearoa, New Zealand, and Polynesia. The church's constitution says that, among other things, it is required to "maintain the right of every person to choose any particular cultural expression of the faith". As a result, the church's General Synod has agreed upon the development of the three-person primacy based on this three tikanga system; it has three primates, each representing a tikanga, who share authority.

The Anglican Church is an apostolic church, which claims to trace its bishops back to the apostles via holy orders. A New Zealand Prayer Book, He Karakia Mihinare o Aotearoa (ANZPB/HKMOA), containing traditional liturgies, rites, and blessings, is central to the church's worship.

The Anglican Church in Aotearoa, New Zealand and Polynesia is not established as an official church of any sovereign state, unlike the Church of England from which it grew. However, Anglicans have taken a preeminent leadership role on New Zealand state occasions. In 2016, responding to a peer-reviewed study in the Journal of Anglican Studies published by Cambridge University Press, the church reported having 459,711 total members, of whom 220,659 were regularly active members. In The Church of England Yearbook 2024, the church reported 469,036 members. In 2017, Growth and Decline in the Anglican Communion: 1980 to the Present, published by Routledge, collected research reporting there were 632,100 Anglicans in New Zealand and Polynesia, including 6,600 in Fiji, 1,600 in Tonga, 340 in Samoa, and 90 in the Cook Islands. Anglicanism is the second largest single Christian religious affiliation in New Zealand, according to the 2023 census, which recorded 245,301 adherents in New Zealand. Roman Catholicism recorded 289,788. (Note: When all "Catholic" religious affiliations are added together they total 492,384. See Religion in New Zealand § Religious affiliation for further information.)

Since the 1960s the New Zealand Anglican Church in general has approved the marriage by a priest in a church of someone whose earlier marriage was dissolved (even though the former spouse still lives), and has approved blessings for same-sex couples.

== Names ==
Until 1992, the church was formally called the "Church of the Province of New Zealand", and was also referred to as the "Church of England". It is now known as the "Anglican Church", reflecting its membership of the worldwide Anglican Communion. Members of the church typically identify as "Anglicans".

The Māori name for the New Zealand Anglican Church, Te Hāhi Mihinare – meaning "the missionary church" – reveals its origins in the work of the first missionaries to arrive in New Zealand.

== History ==
=== First New Zealand Anglicans ===
While heading the parliamentary campaign against the British slave trade for twenty years until the passage of the Slave Trade Act 1807, William Wilberforce championed the foundation of the Church Missionary Society (CMS) in 1799, with other members of the Clapham Sect including John Venn, determined to improve the treatment of indigenous people by the British.

The CMS mission to New Zealand was begun by Samuel Marsden, the Anglican chaplain in New South Wales. He had met the Ngāpuhi chiefs Te Pahi and Ruatara when they travelled outside New Zealand, and they invited him to visit their country. Ruatara provided protection for the first mission station, at Rangihoua in the Bay of Islands.

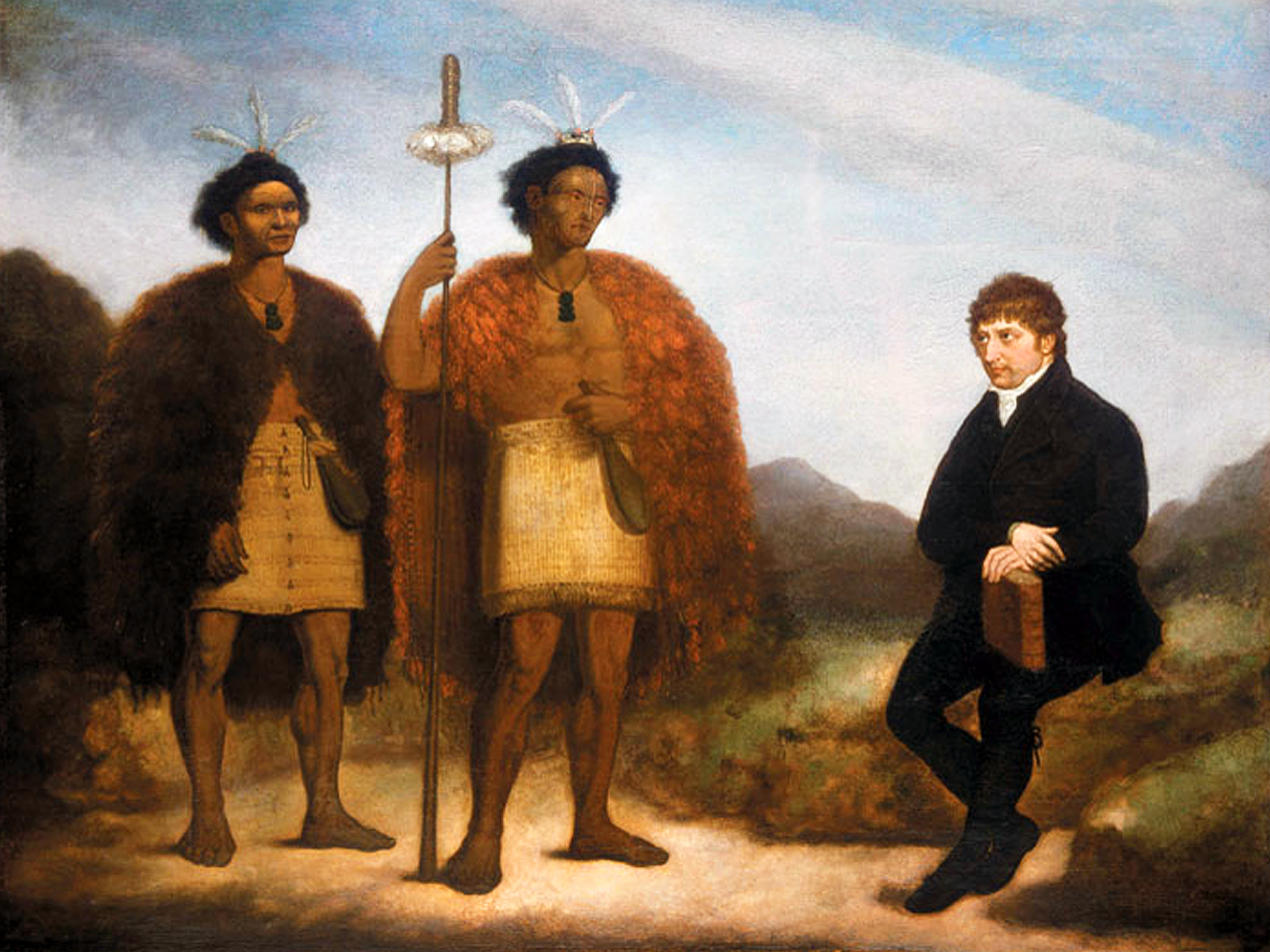
This 1820 painting shows Ngāpuhi chiefs Waikato (left) and Hongi Hika, and Anglican missionary Thomas Kendall

For the first years of the mission, intertribal Musket Wars hampered the missionaries' movements and Māori interest in their message. Personal disputes between the early missionaries, and their involvement in trading muskets, also compromised their efforts.

The Māori language did not then have an indigenous writing system. Missionaries learned to speak Māori, and introduced the Latin alphabet. The CMS, including Thomas Kendall; Māori, including Tītore and Hongi Hika; and Cambridge University's Samuel Lee, developed the written language between 1817 and 1830. In 1833, while living in the Paihia mission house of Anglican priest and the now head of the New Zealand CMS mission (later to become the New Zealand Church Missionary Society) Rev Henry Williams, missioner William Colenso published the Māori translations of books of the Bible, the first books printed in New Zealand. His 1837 Māori New Testament was the first indigenous language translation of the Bible published in the southern hemisphere. Demand for the Māori New Testament, and the Prayer Book that followed, grew exponentially, as did Christian Māori leadership and public Christian services, with 33,000 Māori soon attending regularly. Literacy and understanding the Bible increased mana and social and economic benefits, decreased slavery and intertribal violence, and increased peace and respect for all people in Māori society, including women.

=== Missionaries and the Treaty of Waitangi ===
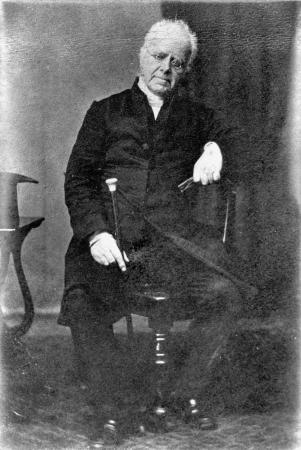
Henry Williams in about 1865

Māori generally respected the British, partially due to their relationships with missionaries and also due to British status as a major maritime power, which had been made apparent to Māori travelling outside New Zealand. In England the church and state were interlinked and the Church of England had a special status guaranteed in law. Evangelicals, as loyal Anglicans, accepted this status and encouraged Māori to look to the British Crown for protection and recognition. As a result CMS missionaries, especially Henry Williams, played a leading part in encouraging Māori to sign the Treaty of Waitangi in 1840.

Assuming that a treaty in English could not be understood, debated or agreed to by Māori, Hobson asked CMS head missioner Henry Williams, and his son Edward Marsh Williams, who was a scholar in Māori language and custom, to translate the document overnight on 4 February. Henry Williams was concerned with the actions of the New Zealand Company in Wellington and felt he had to agree with Hobson's request to ensure the treaty would be as favourable as possible to Māori. Williams avoided using any English words that had no expression in Māori "thereby preserving entire the spirit and tenor" of the treaty. He added a note to the copy Hobson sent to Gibbs stating, "I certify that the above is as literal a translation of the Treaty of Waitangi as the idiom of the language will allow." The gospel-based literacy of Māori meant some of the concepts communicated in the translation were from the Māori Bible, including kawanatanga (governorship) and rangatiratanga (chiefly rule), and the idea of the treaty as a "covenant" was biblical.

In later years this missionary support for the treaty led to increasing disillusionment among Māori as the treaty was ignored by the colonial and settler governments. The emergence of Māori religious movements such as Pai Mārire and Ringatū reflected this rejection of missionary Christianity. When the missionary Carl Sylvius Völkner was suspected of spying by Māori in 1865, the fact that he was a member of the Anglican clergy afforded him no protection, and he was executed.

=== Settler church ===
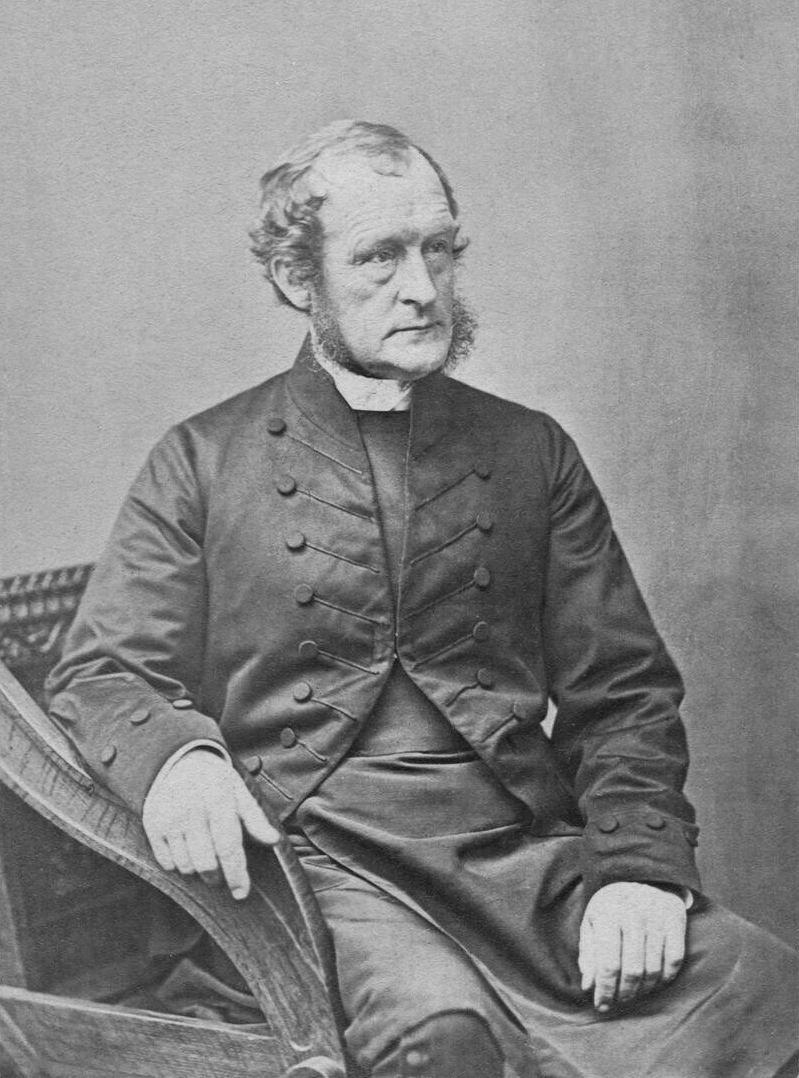
Bishop Selwyn in 1867

After missionary work amongst Māori, the second major influence shaping Anglicanism in New Zealand came from the large number of Anglican settlers who arrived in the mid-19th century. Most were from England, with some from Ireland and Australia. The early CMS missionary beginnings and the large number of Anglican settlers resulted in Anglicanism becoming the largest religious denomination in New Zealand. In 1858, more than half of the colony's population was Anglican.

George Augustus Selwyn became Bishop of New Zealand (the only Anglican bishop to have this title) in 1841. He headed both the Māori and settler Anglican parts of the church. Evangelical missionaries were suspicious of his control over them and his emphasis on the authority of the church, while settlers were hostile towards his pro-Māori stance. He increasingly found himself caught between Māori and Pākehā issues of land and sovereignty.

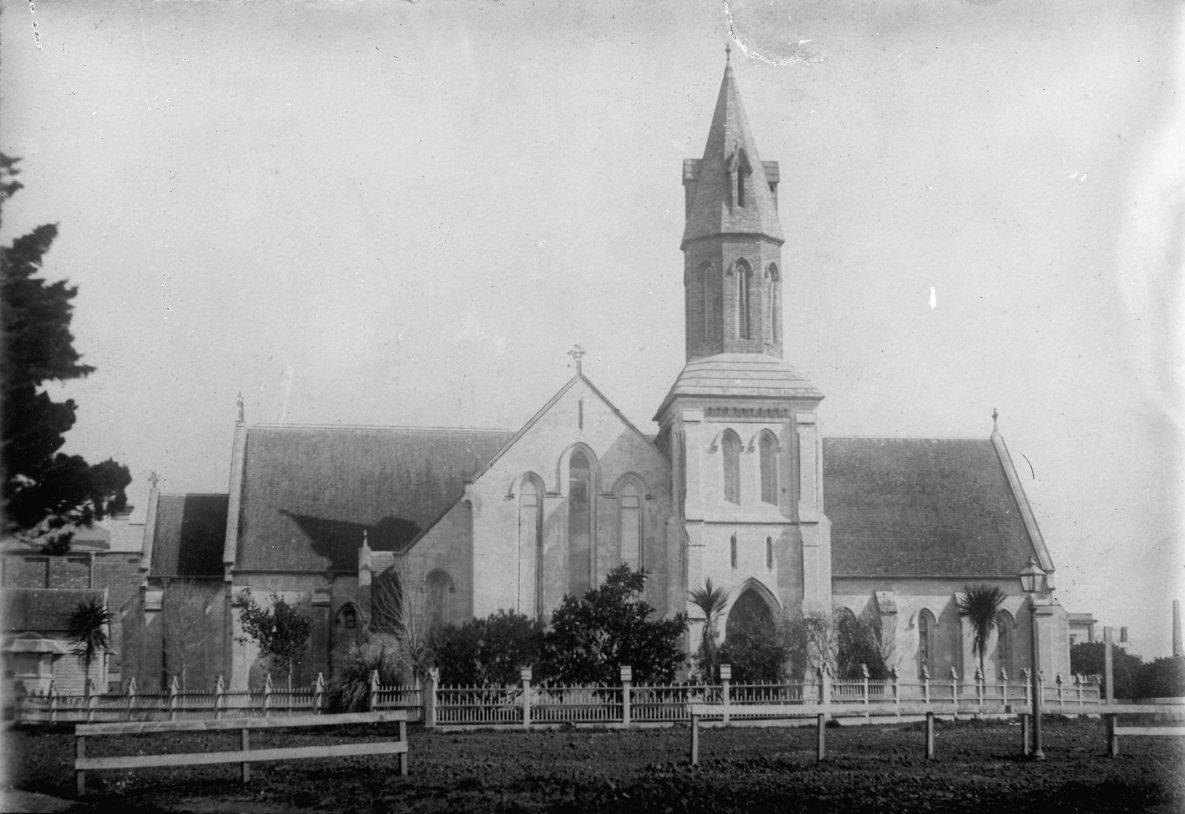
The original St Paul's building, photographed in the 1880s

The first Anglican parish in the then capital of Auckland was St Paul's, which was founded in 1841 within a year of the foundation of the city and is known as the 'Mother Church' of the city. The first St Paul's building was in Emily Place, just off Princes Street, where a plaque still marks the site of the beginning of the Anglican Church in Auckland. St Paul's was the seat of the Bishop of New Zealand, for Selwyn's entire 28 year tenure and served as Auckland's Cathedral for over 40 years.

Bishop Selwyn opened St Paul's Church over four services on 7 May 1843. He later wrote, "The services began with a native congregation at nine; some of whom having only heard of the opening on Saturday evening, paddled a distance of twelve miles by sea during the night, in order to be present. The greater number were in full European clothing, and took part in the Church service, in a manner which contrasts most strikingly with that of the silent and unkneeling congregations of the English settlers." St Paul's then held four Sunday services weekly, serving both Māori and European congregations, with two services conducted in te reo Māori and two in English. Bishop Selwyn had learned te reo Māori himself.

The CMS criticised Selwyn for being ineffective in training and ordaining clergy – especially Māori. It took him 11 years to ordain the first Māori Anglican minister, Rev Rota Waitoa (who studied under Selwyn for 10 years) at St Paul's on 22 May 1853, and 24 years to ordain a Māori priest. Selwyn went on to ordain seven more Māori clergy at St Paul's, but his high church ways were blamed for undermining the work of the CMS and damaging Māori enthusiasm for Christianity.

Selwyn generally advocated for Māori rights and was often a critic of the unjust and reckless land acquisition practices that led to the New Zealand Wars. However, his support of the Invasion of the Waikato as chaplain, damaged his and the church's relationship with Māori, which is still felt today. In 1865, Selwyn wrote of the Anglican Church's relationship with Māori, "oh! how things have changed! how much of the buoyancy of hope has been sobered down by experience! when, instead of a nation of believers welcoming me as their father, I find here and there a few scattered sheep, the remnant of a flock which has forsaken the shepherd".

St Paul's was considered a garrison church, but when the first regimental colours unfurled in New Zealand were donated to the church after the New Zealand Wars, its second vicar, Rev John Frederick Lloyd (who was also a chaplain in the wars) turned them down so "no jealousies of race or feelings of hostility should ever be permitted to enter, but where men should remember only that they are one in Christ".

=== Church constitution ===
While Anglicans carried some of the privileges of the Church of England to New Zealand, they struggled to devise a method of church organisation which took account of their new non-establishment status alongside other churches. In 1857, after 15 years of consultation, a constitution for the New Zealand church was finalised on the basis of voluntary compact. Links with the traditions of the mother-church in England were guaranteed in their worship, ministry and beliefs. At national and regional levels, bishops, and representatives from the clergy and laity met together but voted separately on church matters, ensuring that each group had an equal voice. The constitution resolved problems for the settler church but failed to deal adequately with the administrative and leadership needs of the Māori church.

=== Regional identity ===
Selwyn's diocese was progressively divided into sub-districts, beginning in 1856 when Christchurch became a new diocese; Wellington, Nelson and Waiapu (East Coast) followed in 1858, and Dunedin separated from Christchurch in 1869.

Each diocese developed its own identity. The Christchurch diocese was heavily influenced by the English settlers who arrived with the Canterbury Association. Under its second bishop, Andrew Suter, Nelson developed an evangelical flavour which continued in the 21st century. Waiapu had missionary beginnings, holding its first four synods (official church conferences) in the Māori language. That missionary influence was overtaken by the New Zealand wars and the growth of settler influence.

=== 20th and 21st centuries ===
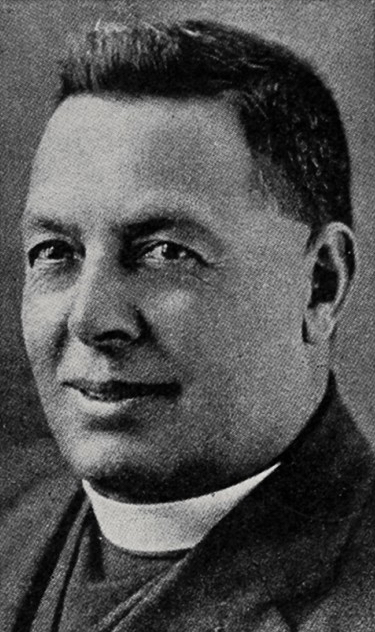
Bishop Bennet in 1928

Despite Māori being a significant portion of the members of the Anglican church in the 19th and early 20th century, calls for a Māori bishop went unheard. Selwyn refused to ordain any Māori ministers despite ability, believing that anyone who was not trained in the Greek and Latin languages was inappropriate to serve as a bishop.

After decades of lobbying from parishioners, and fears that more Māori would leave the church to join the Rātana movement, the first Pīhopa o Aotearoa (Bishop of Aotearoa), Frederick Bennett, was consecrated in 1928.

The largest religious denomination in each territorial authority at the 2013 census. The Anglican Church is represented by light blue shading.

By 1936 the proportion of Anglicans in the total population had dropped from half to 40%. Anglican numbers declined more sharply from the mid-1960s. Around 900,000 people identified themselves as Anglican in 1976, 800,000 in 1981 and 580,000 in 2001. In the 2013 census 12% of the population, or 460,000 people, identified themselves as Anglicans. The 2018 census recorded 314,913 Anglicans in the New Zealand part of the church. Anglicanism was the country's second largest religious denomination after Catholicism.

The number who attend services on a regular basis or have any connection with the church is considerably smaller. While one in three New Zealanders identify as Christian, only about one in ten identify as "active practisers".

In parishes that no longer had enough church members to financially support a stipended priest, schemes for local people or self-supporting priests to take responsibility for the tasks of ministry were developed.

A New Zealand Prayer Book, He Karakia Mihinare o Aotearoa, was published in 1989, after a period of revision that started in 1964.

The General Synod of the church adopted a revised constitution in 1992, introducing the tikanga system. This structure has been criticised by some, with one Anglican priest comparing the tikanga to apartheid or ghettoization, arguing that the system has resulted in churches which are divided along racial lines.

== Leadership ==
The church has decided that three bishops shall share the position of Primate and style of archbishop, each representing one of the three tikanga. These are the three bishops presently sharing the title of Primate and Archbishop of New Zealand:

- Don Tamihere, Te Pīhopa o Te Tairāwhiti and Te Pīhopa o Aotearoa, who oversees Te Pīhopatanga o Aotearoa (i.e. all five Hui Amorangi/Pīhopatanga) for the Māori people of Aotearoa New Zealand
- Justin Duckworth is the Senior Bishop of the New Zealand dioceses, who oversees dioceses in Aotearoa New Zealand for Pākehā (people of European or other non-Māori heritage)
- Sione Uluʻilakepa, Bishop of Polynesia (the sole diocesan bishop of tikanga Pasefika), who oversees the Diocese of Polynesia for the Oceania region of the Pacific Islands that predominantly lie north and east of Aotearoa New Zealand.

== Tikanga system ==
=== Aotearoa ===
Te Pīhopatanga o Aotearoa, one of three tikanga, oversees churches for the Māori people of Aotearoa. Aotearoa is made up of five pīhopatanga or regional bishoprics (sometimes called hui amorangi, i.e. synods), each led by te pīhopa o... (Note: meaning "the bishop of..."):

- Tairāwhiti (literally "east coast")
- Tai Tokerau (literally "north coast")
- Upoko o Te Ika (literally "the head of the fish", i.e. the southern part of the North Island; Wellington/Taranaki)
- Waipounamu (literally "greenstone waters", i.e. the South Island)
- Manawa o Te Wheke (literally "the heart of the octopus", i.e. North Island central region)

=== New Zealand ===
The tikanga of New Zealand is made up of seven dioceses:

- Auckland
- Christchurch
- Dunedin
- Nelson
- Waiapu
- Waikato and Taranaki
- Wellington

The dioceses in New Zealand are led by a "senior bishop" (previously "Convening Bishop") elected from among the diocesan bishops of the tikanga. In the three-person primacy, that Senior Bishop is ex officio co-equal Primate and Archbishop for the whole province. Bishop of Wellington Justin Duckworth has held this role since 2024.

Cathedrals

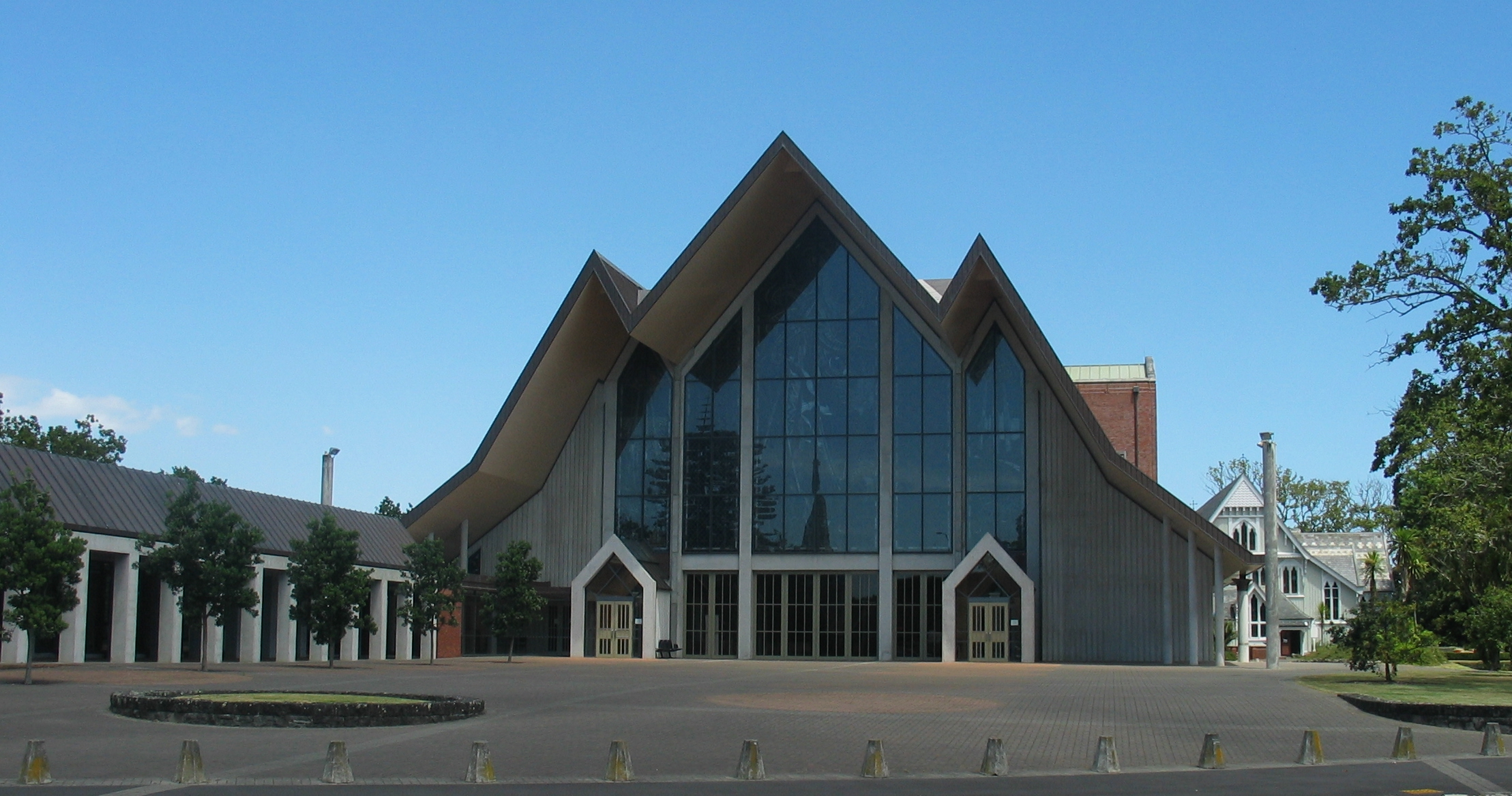
Holy Trinity Cathedral in Parnell, Auckland

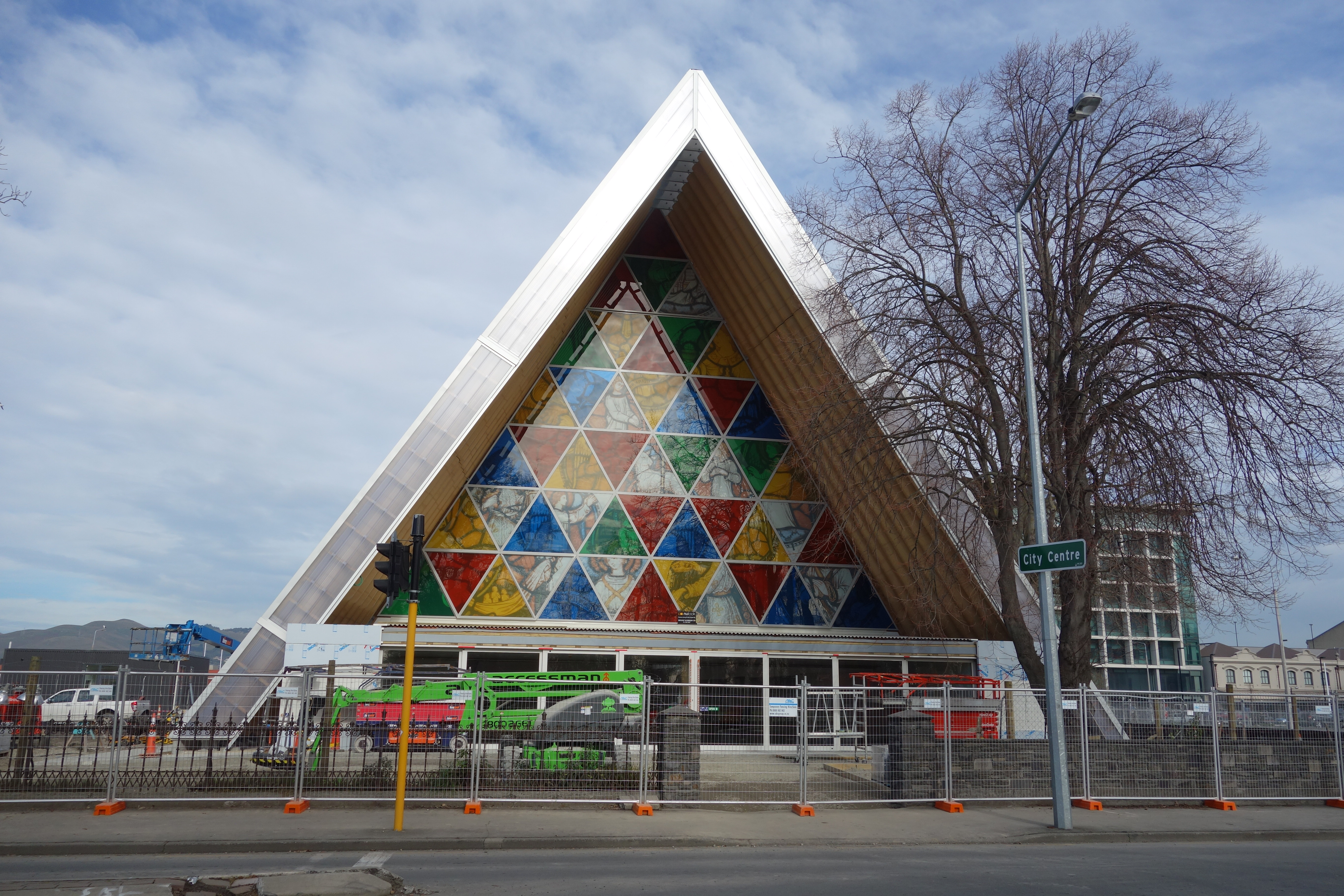
"Cardboard Cathedral", the pro-cathedral of Christchurch

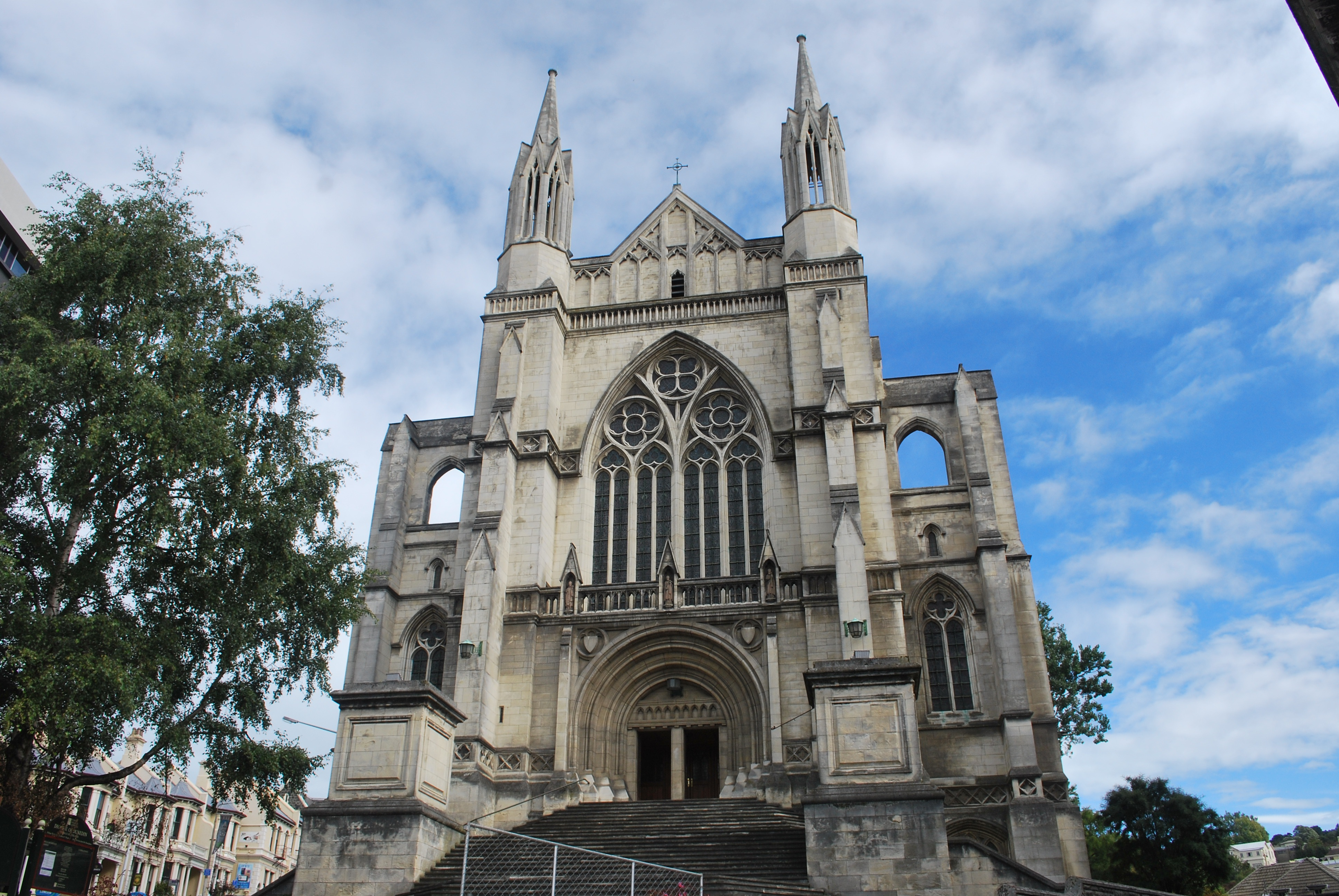
St Paul's Cathedral in Dunedin

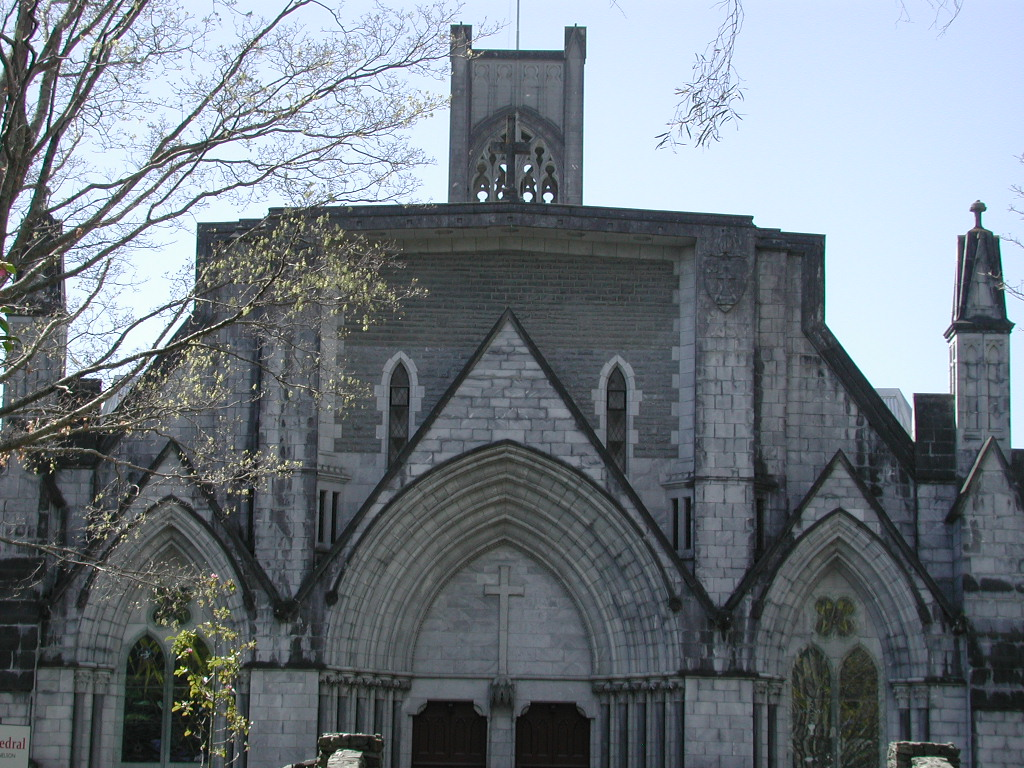
Christ Church Cathedral in Nelson

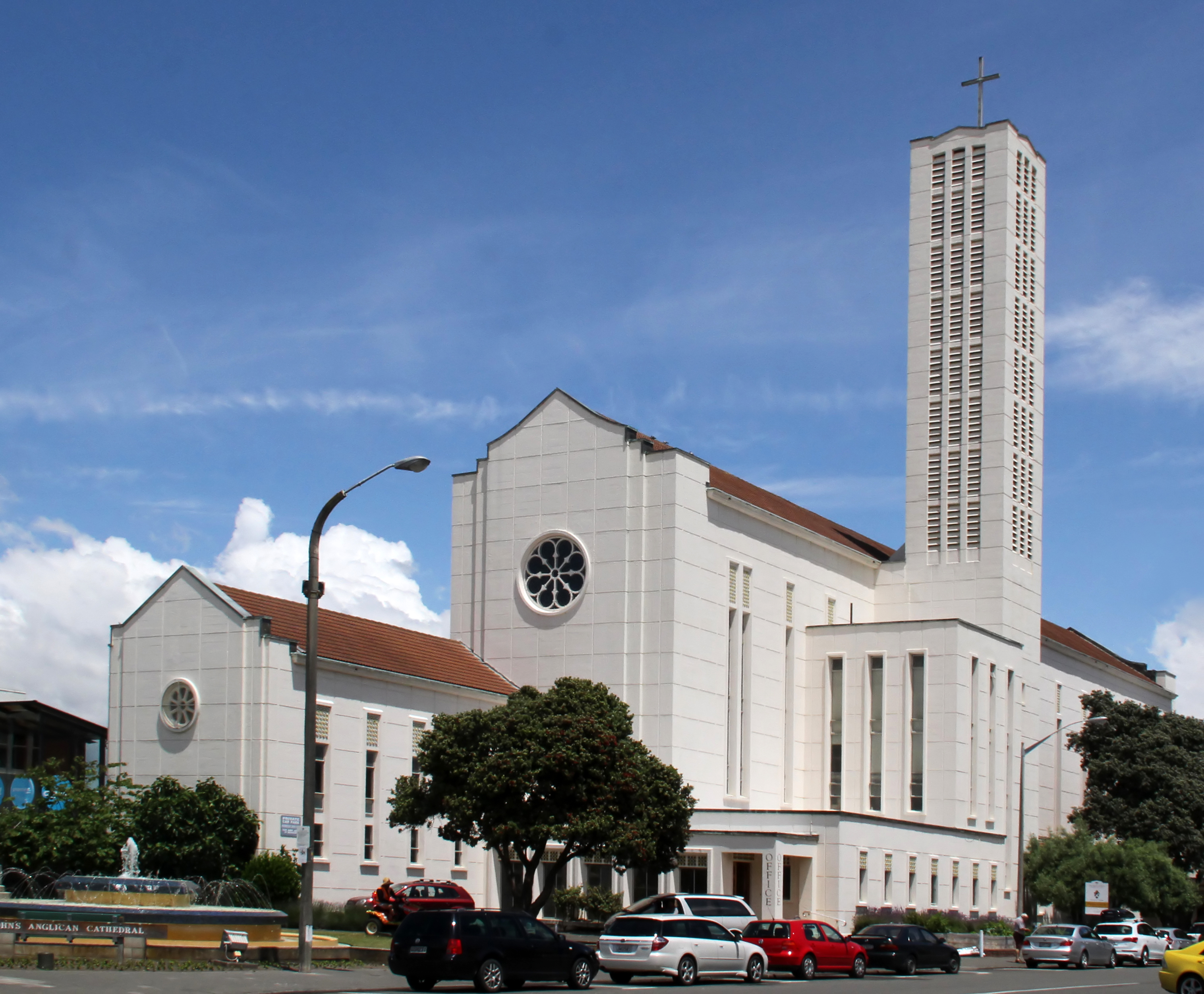
Cathedral of St John the Evangelist in Napier

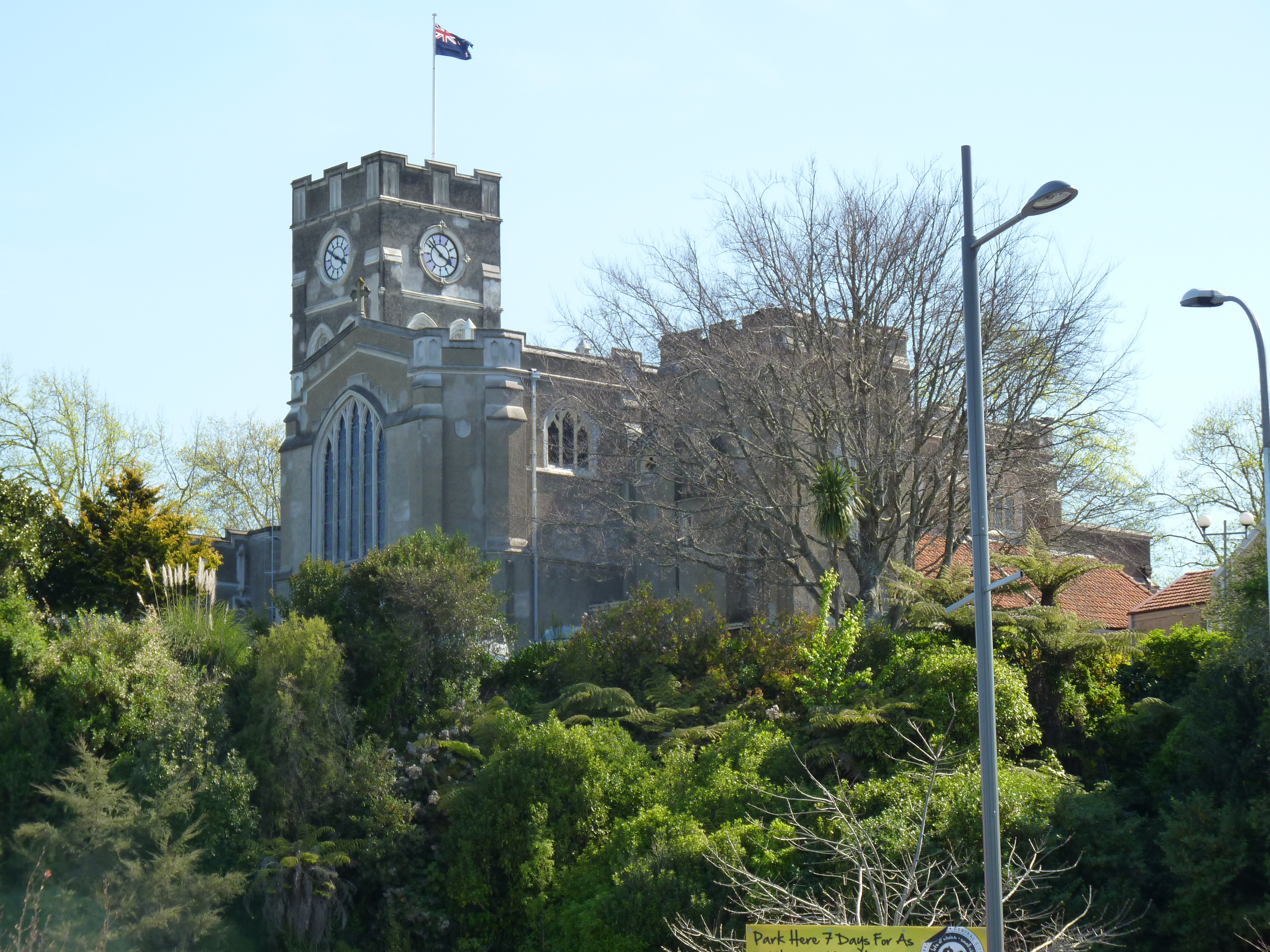
St Peter's Cathedral in Hamilton

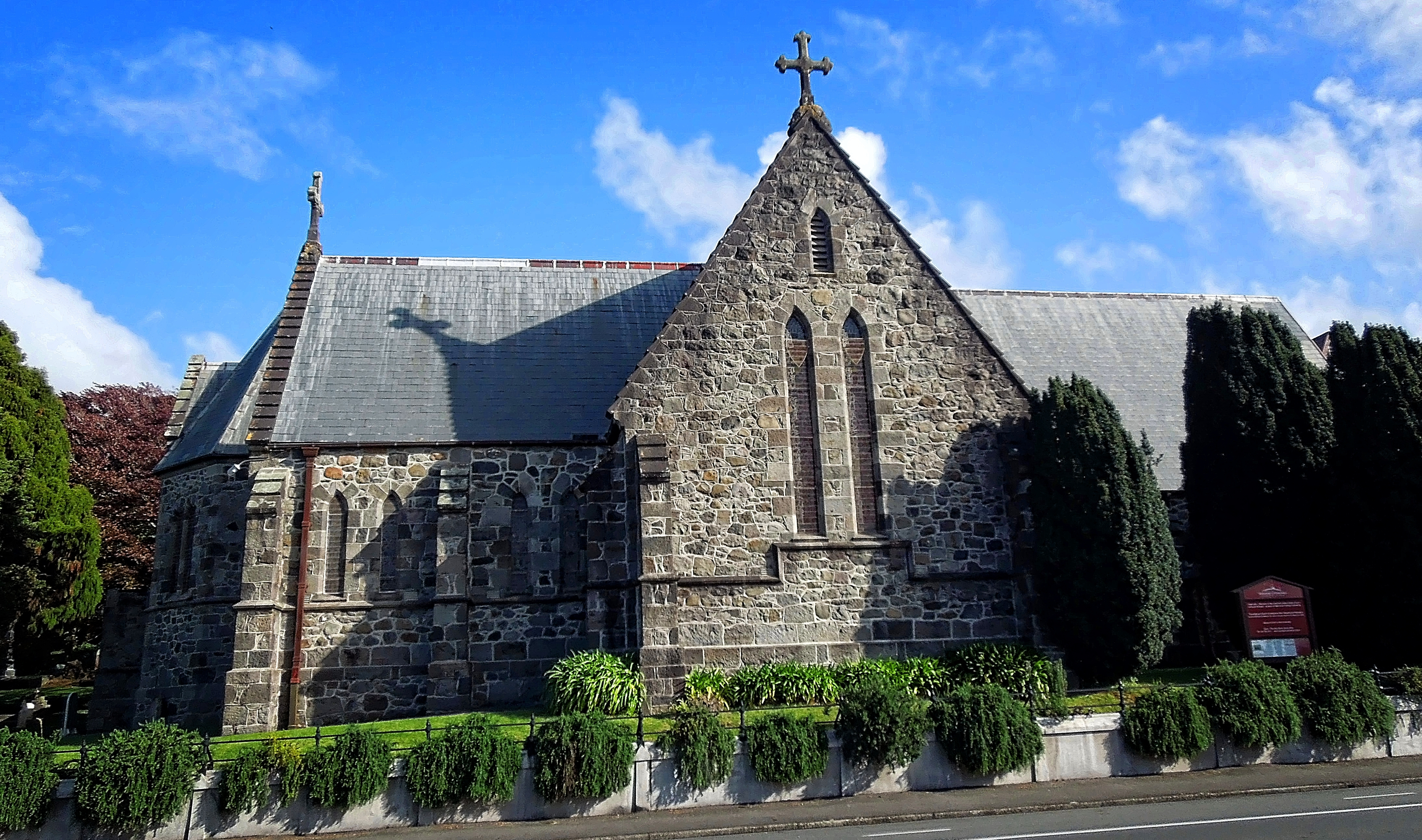
Taranaki Cathedral, Church of St Mary, in New Plymouth

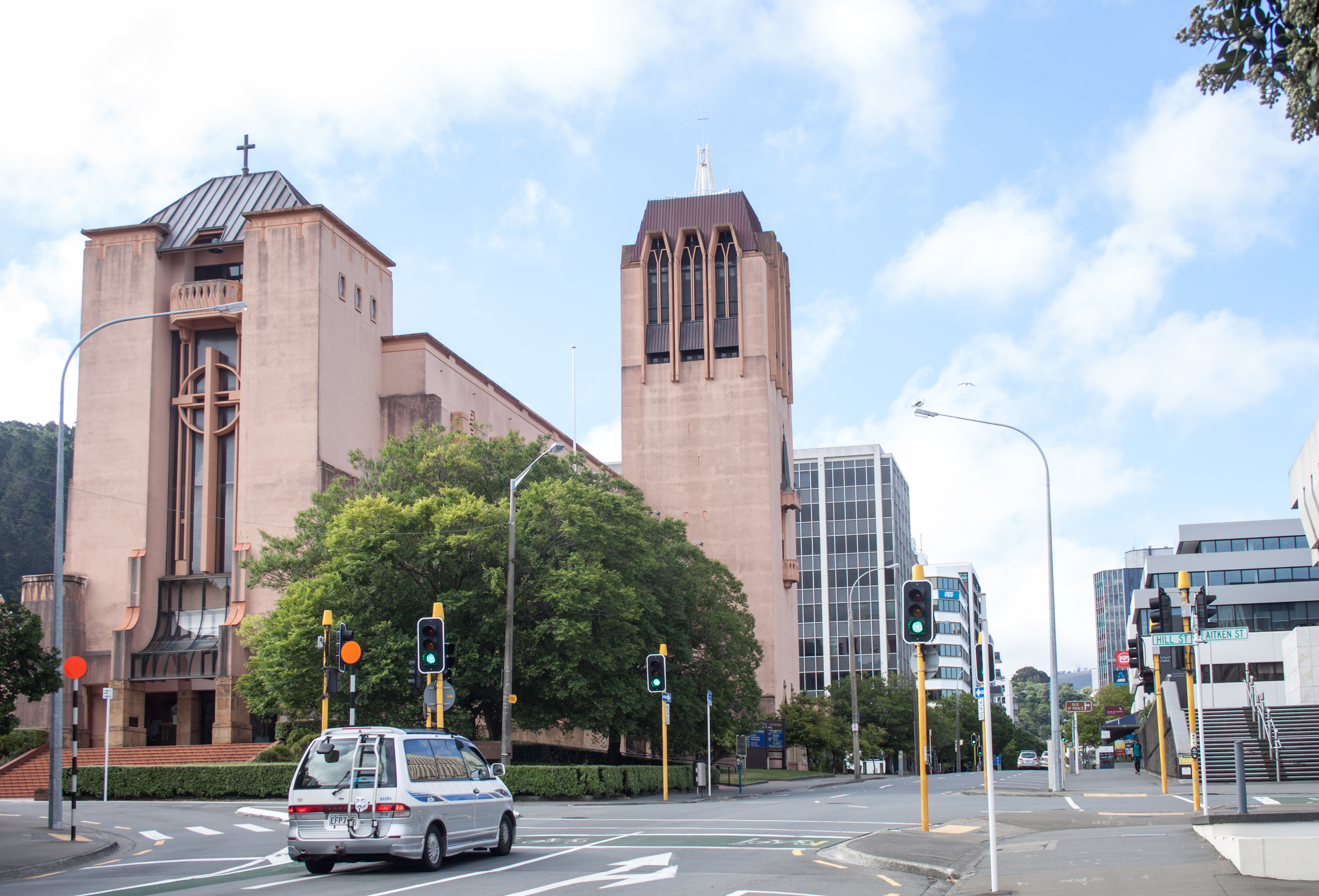
Wellington Cathedral of St Paul

=== Polynesia ===
The Diocese of Polynesia, or the Tikanga Pasefika serves Anglicans in Fiji, Tonga, Samoa, and the Cook Islands. The diocese's first bishop was consecrated in 1908. The diocesan cathedral is Holy Trinity Cathedral in Suva, Fiji. In the province's three-person primacy, the diocesan Bishop of Polynesia is automatically Primate and Archbishop; Sione Uluʻilakepa has been the diocesan bishop since 2023. The Bishop of Polynesia has been supported by four suffragan bishops: Api Qiliho recently retired as Bishop in Vanua Levu and Taveuni; Gabriel Sharma is Bishop in Viti Levu West; ʻAka Vaka is Bishop in Tonga; former Archbishop Winston Halapua led the ministry to Polynesians in mainland New Zealand before he became diocesan bishop — his suffragan post has not been filled since; there are archdeacons of Suva and Ovalau, Samoa and American Samoa, and Tonga.

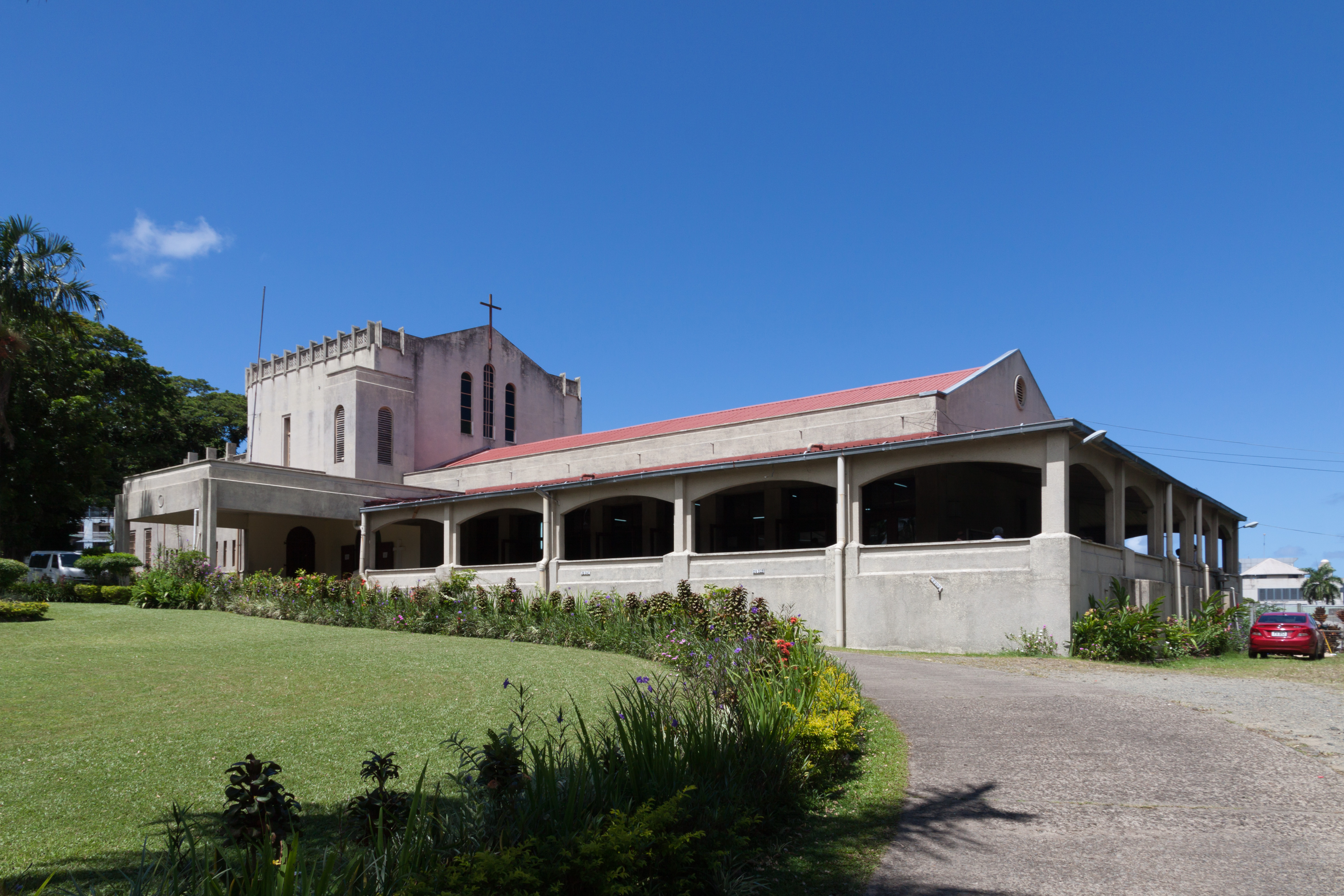
Diocese Of Polynesia Holy Trinity Cathedral in Suva, Fiji

== Ministry ==
The Anglican Church embraces three orders of ministry: deacon, priest (or presbyter) and bishop. Increasingly, an emphasis is being placed on these orders to work collaboratively within the wider ministry of the whole people of God.

=== Theological training ===
Residential theological training is carried out primarily at St John's College, Auckland, which is also organised according to the three tikanga approach. Theological training was formerly carried out by Selwyn College, Otago in Dunedin and College House in Christchurch, currently these colleges are hall of residence for students from all faculties of the University of Otago and the University of Canterbury. While the two colleges still fall under the jurisdiction of the Anglican Diocese of Dunedin and Anglican Diocese of Christchurch and have the extensive theological holdings in their libraries, they no longer train ordinands.

== Worship and liturgy ==
A New Zealand Prayer Book, He Karakia Mihinare o Aotearoa, providing liturgy for "a multitude of voices", contains a liturgical calendar, forms of daily prayer, of baptism, of the Eucharist (also known as Holy Communion), and other texts for services such as marriage, funerals, and ordination, as well as a catechism for instruction in the faith. All these are central to this Church's worship, as for other Anglican Churches.

The book was published in 1989 and attracted considerable interest for its use of locally-composed and borrowed texts, and the use of Maori language as well as of English. A revised edition in 2020 expanded use of Maori as well as providing some liturgies in other Pacific languages.

Use of the 1662 and 1928 versions of the Book of Common Prayer (BCP) of the Church of England is also permitted, along with resources from the prayer books of other provinces within the Anglican Communion.

== Beliefs ==
=== Ordination ===
The Anglican Church in Aotearoa, New Zealand and Polynesia has allowed the ordination of women as deacons and priests since 1977 and as bishops since 1988. Penny Jamieson, Bishop of Dunedin from 1990 to 2004, was the world’s first Anglican diocesan woman bishop. Wai Quayle became the first indigenous woman bishop in 2019.

In 2011, the Diocese of Auckland voted in favour of ordaining partnered gay and lesbian priests. Congregations in the Auckland Diocese may offer a 'relationship blessing' for two partners. In 2005, a same-sex couple was joined in a civil union at St Matthew in the City in the Auckland Diocese. A gay priest was licensed in the Auckland Diocese as of 2009.

In 2011, the Waiapu Diocese adopted a resolution affirming the ordination of gay and lesbian clergy and asking for an authorised liturgy for blessing same-sex relationships. The Bishop's chaplain in the Waiapu Diocese has also performed a blessing for a same-sex couple. In 2017, the Bishop of Waiapu installed an openly gay priest, who is married to his partner, as the dean of Waiapu Cathedral.

=== Marriage ===
In 2012, some bishops and four dioceses supported a rite of blessing for same-sex unions. Motion 30, adopted by the 62nd General Synod on 14 May 2014, designated a working task group with the purpose of creating a "process and structure" that would allow the blessing of same-sex unions, while also upholding the traditional doctrine of marriage as the union of a man and a woman. This proposal drew the opposition of the most conservative factions of the province's clergy and laity, with a submission presented by two clergy and a layman stating that the church's constitution stated that "No doctrines which are repugnant to the Doctrines and Sacraments of Christ as held and maintained by this Church shall be advocated or inculcated by any person acknowledging the authority of General Synod." While the blessing services were being developed and discussed, the resolution said "clergy should be permitted 'to recognise in public worship' a same-gender civil union or state marriage of members of their faith community."

In 2016, the Dunedin Diocese adopted a resolution affirming blessing for the relationship of "two people" irrespective of gender. In the Dunedin Diocese, "Blessings of same-sex relationships are offered in line with Diocesan Policy and with the bishop’s permission." The Dunedin Diocese also ordained an openly gay deacon in "a committed same-sex relationship." Subsequently, the same deacon was ordained a priest.

In 2016, the committee responsible for developing the rites of blessing released its proposed liturgies for same-sex couples to be discussed by the General Synod. The General Synod 2016 voted to 'receive' the report on blessings but left the option to "[lie] on the table" and the issue will be reviewed again in 2018. The church's spokesperson said that "[the Synod] needs more work and time to create a structure that can allow for blessing of committed life-long monogamous same-sex relationships." "However, Synod did pass a constitutional change allowing bishops the right to authorize (sic) a service for use in his or her diocese".

In 2018, the General Synod/Te Hinota voted in favour of approving Motion 29 and allowing blessings of same-sex marriage.

=== Divorce and abortion ===
In 1970 it became possible for divorcees to be married in Anglican churches with the permission of the diocesan bishop; since 1984 this permission is no longer necessary. From the 1980s society's acceptance of unmarried couples living together and the use of secular marriage celebrants further undermined the church's traditional attitude towards and role in controlling marriage.

Anglican submissions to the McMillan Committee on Abortion in 1937 opposed abortion, regarding both abortion and birth control as part of a general moral decline. The church’s submissions to the 1974 Royal Commission on Contraception, Sterilisation and Abortion showed a considerable shift from this earlier position, with a range of opinions on abortion and an attempt to balance religious care for the mother and the rights of the foetus. This diversity indicated a lack of an authoritative Anglican Church position on issues like abortion and a loosening of traditional attitudes.

== Social issues ==
=== Relation with the Anglican realignment ===
The Fellowship of Confessing Anglicans in New Zealand was started in April 2016 with two conferences that took place in Auckland and Christchurch with nearly 500 members of the province. The FCA in New Zealand is the local expression of the Global Anglican Future Conference (GAFCON), whose chairman, Eliud Wabukala (an archbishop from Kenya), sent a message of support read at the conferences. Video greetings were also sent by Foley Beach of the Anglican Church in North America and Richard Condie, a bishop of the Anglican Diocese of Tasmania and chairman of FCA Australia. Jay Behan became the chair of FCA New Zealand. The creation of FCA New Zealand was a result of the passing of Motion 30 by the Anglican Church in Aotearoa, New Zealand and Polynesia, and the subsequent document A Way Forward, proposing the blessing of same-sex marriages, presented at their general synod in May 2014. Bishop Richard Ellena of Nelson, an Evangelical Anglican, is a supporter of the Anglican realignment, having attended the Global South Fourth Encounter in Singapore in April 2010 and GAFCON II in Nairobi, Kenya, in October 2013. FCA New Zealand was represented at GAFCON III in Jerusalem, in June 2018 by a 56 members delegation, plus two from Fiji, led by Jay Behan.

The Church of Confessing Anglicans Aotearoa/New Zealand was created from the Fellowship of Confessing Anglicans of New Zealand and was officially established on 17 May 2019. This followed the decision taken by the Anglican Church in Aotearoa, New Zealand and Polynesia to allow the blessing of same-sex marriages and civil unions.

=== Sexual abuse ===
The Anglican Church in New Zealand has historically had instances of sexual abuse of children, adults, and clergy. The abuse took place in church-run schools as well as churches, and the church was accused of attempting to cover up the sexual crimes. In 2001, Reverend Louise Deans published a book about her experiences speaking out about abuse inside the church, and the handling of sexual abuse complaints within the New Zealand church was the subject of postdoctoral research by Patricia Allan. This research was later used by the Royal Commission of Inquiry into Abuse in Care.

In March 2021, at the request of Catholic and Anglican Churches, among others, church bodies were included in a nationwide inquiry, the Royal Commission of Inquiry into Abuse in Care. As part of this inquiry it emerged that many documents pertaining to the sexual abuse of people in the church from the 1990s had gone missing.

== See also ==
- Christianity in New Zealand
- Christianity in Fiji
