= Church of the Holy Sepulchre, Grafton =

Historic church in Auckland, New Zealand

Church of the Holy Sepulchre
- St Sepulchre's
- Māori: Te Mīhana Māori o Tāmaki Makaurau
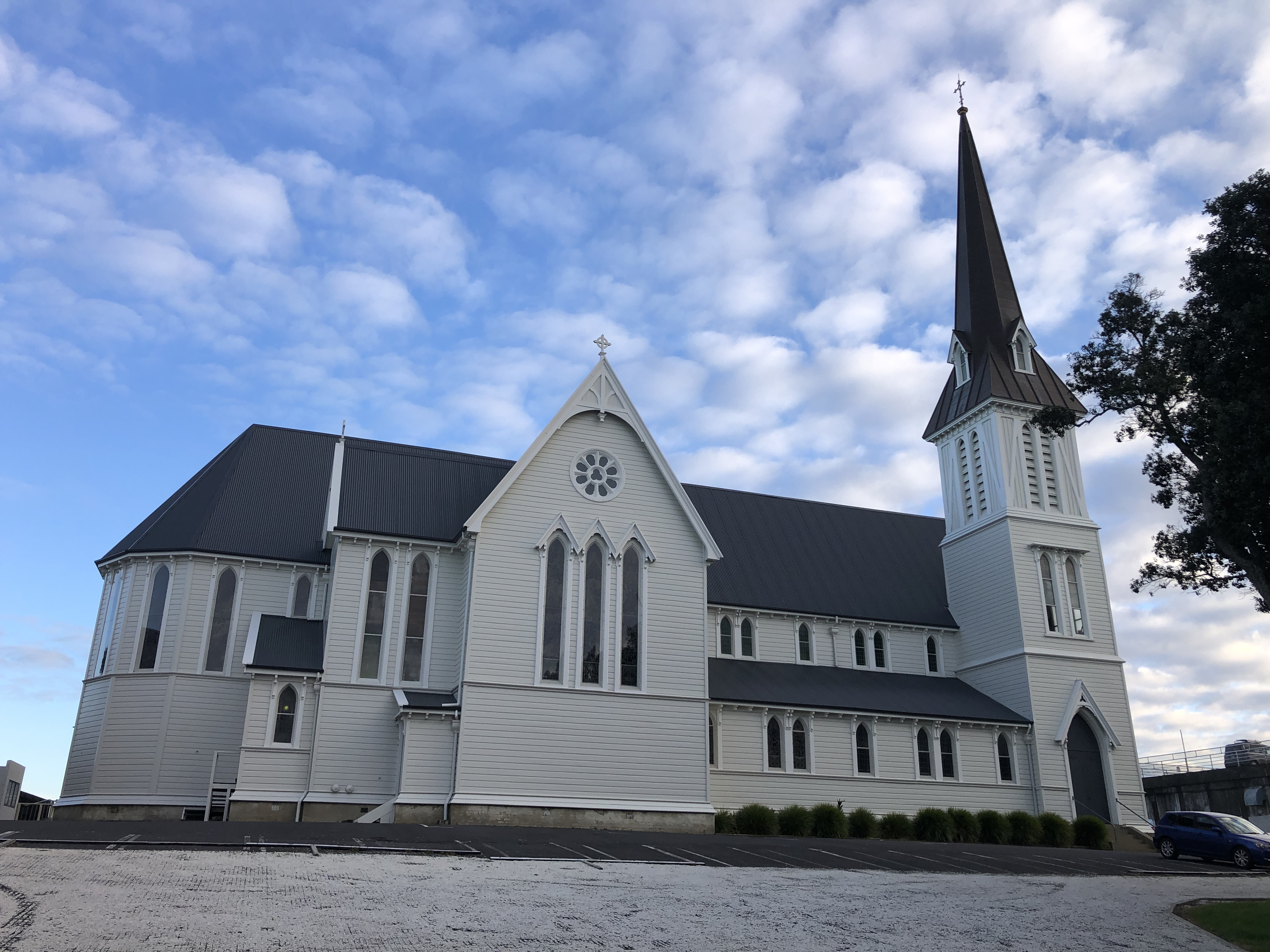
- Church of the Holy Sepulchre, in 2022
- Church of the Holy Sepulchre
- 36°51′53″S 174°45′46″E
- Address: 71 Khyber Pass Road, Grafton, Auckland
- Country: New Zealand
- Denomination: Anglican
- Website: temihana.org.nz

History
- Founded: 1880
- Founder: Bishop William Cowie

Architecture
- Architect: E. Mahoney and Son
- Architectural type: Church
- Style: Gothic Revival
- Years built: 1880–1881

Specifications
- Materials: Kauri timber

Administration
- Province: Aotearoa
- Diocese: Te Tai Tokerau
- Parish: Te Mīhana Māori o Tāmaki Makaurau

Clergy
- Archbishop: Don Tamihere
- Bishop: Te Kitohi Pikaahu
- Vicar: Shona Pink Martin
- Priest(s): Neihana Reihana, Rawiri Ratu, Scott Parekowhai

Heritage New Zealand – Category 1
- Designated: 6 June 2006
- Reference no.: 98

The Church of the Holy Sepulchre (Māori: Te Ana Tapu), commonly known as Holy Sep and Te Mīhana Māori, is an historic Gothic Revival Anglican church located on Khyber Pass Road, Grafton, Auckland, New Zealand.

Established in 1880 and built to a design from Edward Mahoney, the church is registered as a category 1 building with Heritage New Zealand.

The church is operated by Te Mīhana Māori and is overseen by Te Pīhopatanga o Te Tai Tokerau, the northern diocese of the Māori Anglican church.

== History ==
The original church, now known as Old St Sepulchre's Church, was constructed in 1865 on Symonds Street as an Anglican chapel in the nearby Symonds Street Cemetery. Bishop Selwyn opened the church on 27 August 1865 but was never consecrated. Rapid population growth saw a parsonage constructed in 1869 and the following year the church district was made a parish. The Reverend Benjamin Dudley was appointed vicar, a position he held for 36 years. The nave of the church was extended in 1874 so the church could fit more than 400. Shortly after it was decided to build a new church. Old St Sepulchre's was sold in 1903 to Baptists who relocated the church to Mt Eden where it became the Grange Road Baptist Church until 1965 when it became used by St Alban's Boy Scouts.

The foundation stone for the new church was laid in 1880 by Bishop William Cowie, the first Bishop of Auckland. Initially planned to be built in on Symonds Street, it was later decided to build on Khyber Pass Road due to the level of traffic and noise on Symonds Street. The architect was Edward Mahoney of the firm of E. Mahoney and Son, an architecture practice which specialised in designing gothic revival buildings in wood. The site was the top of a large ridge overlooking the parish and beyond and the structure incorporated a steeple that was considered to be the tallest in Auckland.

The timber hall was moved to the Holy Sepulchre site in 1898, to the south of the church. It had been built in 1885 as a temporary place of worship and school for Auckland’s first church, St Paul’s, after their original building had to be demolished, and was designed by William Skinner. After some modifications for classrooms, a small lean-to kitchen and bathroom, the hall accommodated a Sunday school of 325 children.

In the 1930s a Lady Chapel was added to the main building.

The parish was closed in October 1963, and the complex was taken over by the Auckland City Mission, and in 1969 the church became the Auckland Anglican Māori Mission, overseen by the Reverend Kīngi Īhaka, reflecting the movement of Māori from rural to urban centres during the 1950s and 1960s.

In the early 2000s, during Canon Roger Hill’s term as Missioner and church manager, the main church building was fully restored for a cost of $480,000, including recladding the steeple in donated copper.

Holy Sepulchre was used as a location for New Zealand's first Māori language full-length feature film The Maori Merchant of Venice in 2001.

On 4 July 2009 the church hall was refurbished and rededicated as a marae and named Tātai Hono, which means ‘bound together’. The refurbishments included new entrance whakairo by Bernard Makoare, community tukutuku panels and paintings by Theresa Reihana.

On 28 May 2023, Rev'd Shona Pink-Martin was inducted as Māori Missioner, Te Mīhana Māori o Tāmaki Makaurau.

== Leadership ==
In 2025, the Church of the Holy Sepulchre / Te Ana Tapu is operated by Te Mīhana Māori (the Auckland Anglican Māori Mission / Te Mīhana Māori o Tāmaki Makaurau) led by the Missioner, Rev'd Shona Pink-Martin, and overseen by Te Pīhopatanga o Te Tai Tokerau, the northern (Auckland / Northland) diocese of the Māori Anglican church, under the leadership of Bishop Te Kitohi Pikaahu. There are 18 other clergy within the parish and a staff team of nine.

== Gallery ==
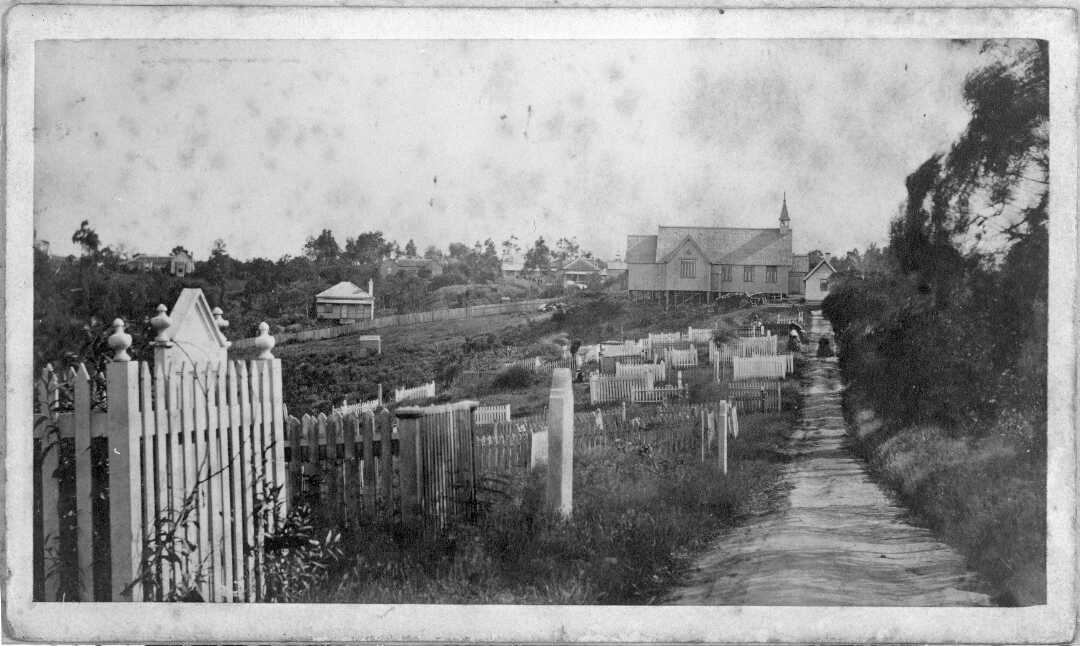
St Sepulchre's in the Anglican section of the Symonds Street Cemetery, circa 1865.

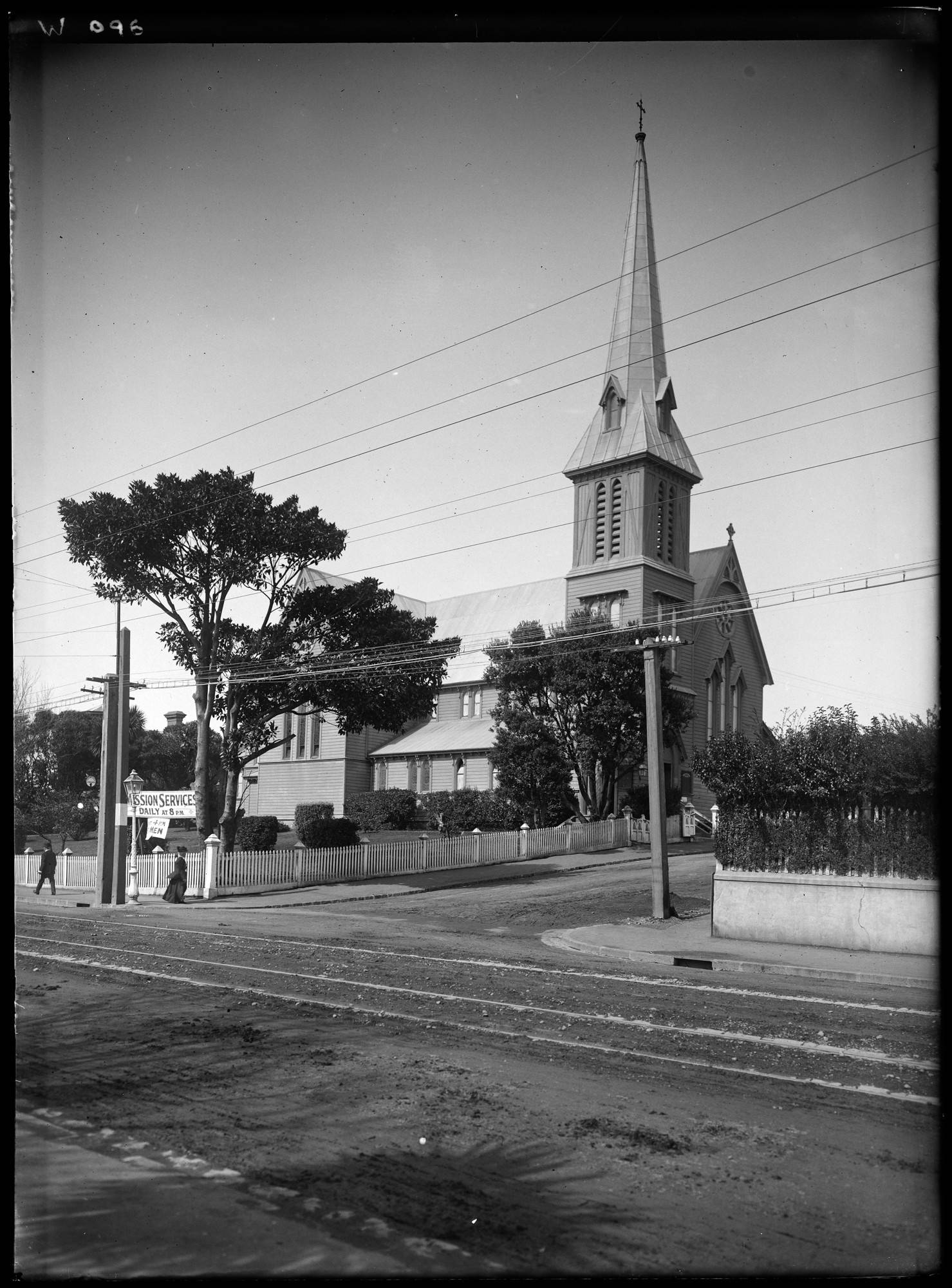
The north and west faces of the Church of the Holy Sepulchre on the corner of Burleigh Street and Khyber Pass, 1910.

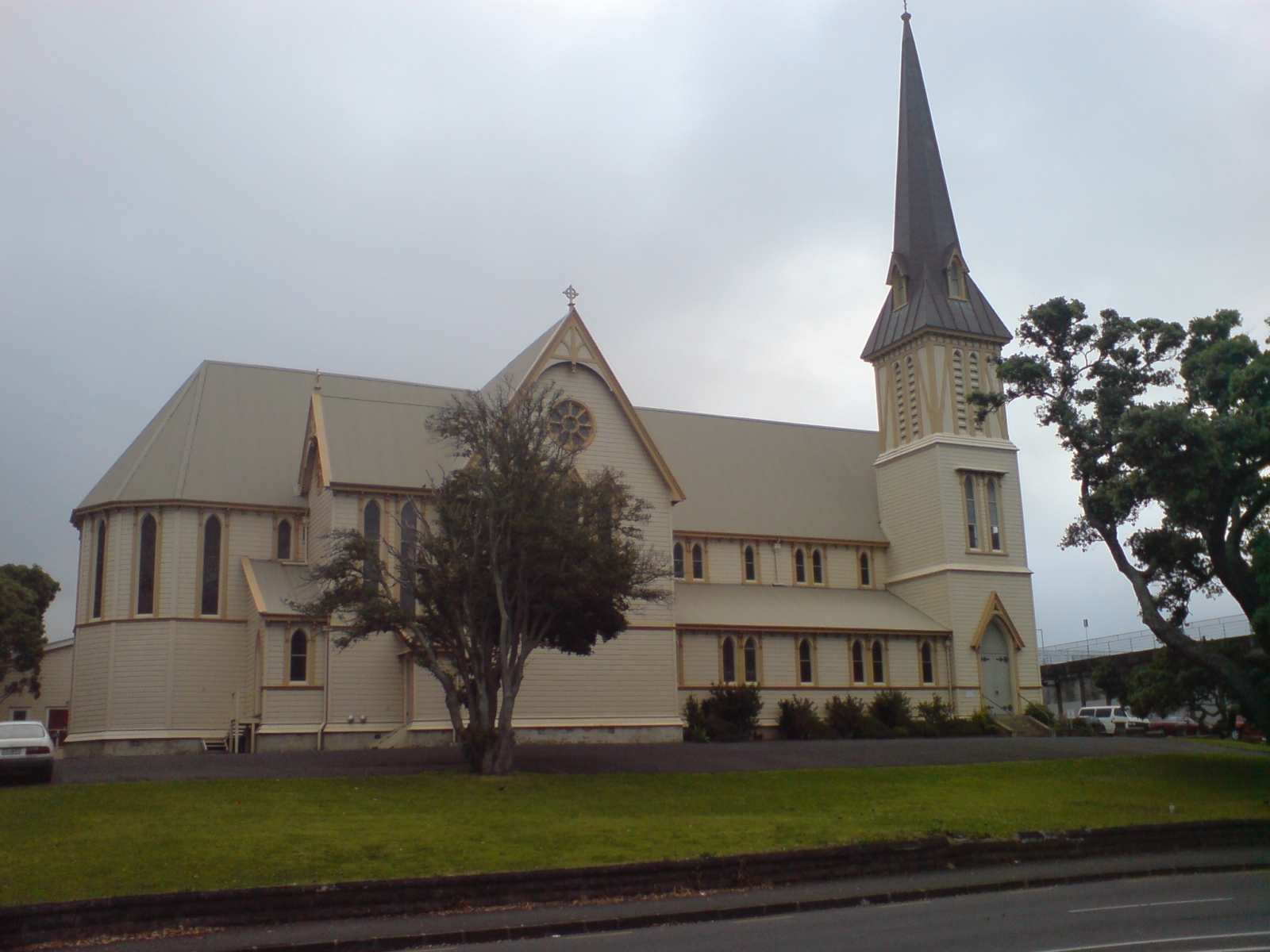
Church of the Holy Sepulchre on Khyber Pass Road, 2009.

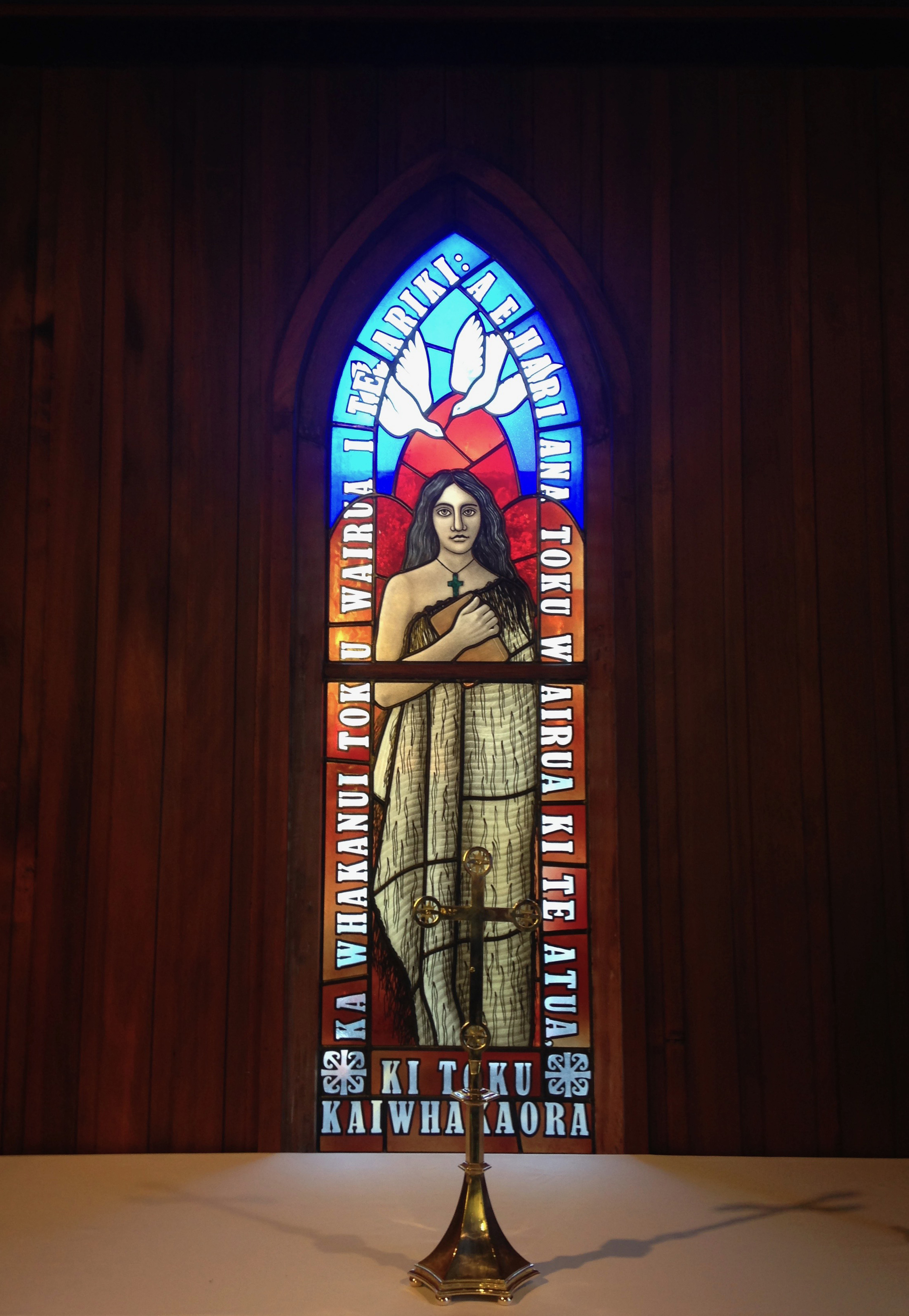
Lady Chapel stained glass window, commissioned in 2004. A wahine (Māori woman) draped in a korowai with pounamu cross necklace holding a bible, framed by Luke 1:46-47. Below her are crests of Te Pīhopatanga o Te Tai Tokerau. Above her are doves.
