= Te Pīhopa o Aotearoa =

Anglican Bishop on New Zealand and Polynesia

The Bishop of Aotearoa (Māori: Te Pīhopa o Aotearoa) is a bishop in the Anglican Church in Aotearoa, New Zealand and Polynesia. The post was created in 1928. The Bishop of Aotearoa is the most senior bishop of Tikanga Māori and the Ordinary of the Bishopric of Aotearoa which jurisdiction covers the whole of Aotearoa, New Zealand. The Bishop of Aotearoa, is also the Primate and Archbishop of Aotearoa New Zealand & Polynesia. The office of Bishop of Aotearoa is currently held by Archbishop Donald Tamihere, who was installed in April 2018 at Manutuke Marae.

== Selection ==
The Bishop of Aotearoa is nominated by Te Runanganui (synod) o Te Pīhopatanga o Aotearoa; but subject to the consent of Te Hīnota Whānui / General Synod. The last election was in Nelson, September 2017; that nomination was approved by March 2018.

=== Te Pīhopatanga o Aotearoa ===
The Bishop of (Te Pīhopa o) Aotearoa heads the Māori Anglican Church throughout New Zealand. The Bishopric of Aotearoa has within it five episcopal units (hui amorangi) each with their own unique identity and a Pīhopa (Bishop): Te Taitokerau (Pīhopa: Kito Pikaahu), Te Manawa o te Wheke (Ngarahu Katene), Te Tairāwhiti (Don Tamihere), Te Upoko o Te Ika (Wai Quayle) and Te Waipounamu (Richard Wallace).

== List of holders ==
1. Frederick Bennett CMG (1928–1950) – first Māori Bishop in the Anglican Communion
2. Wiremu Panapa CBE (1951–1968)
3. Manuhuia Bennett ONZ CMG (1968–1981) – son of Frederick Bennett.
4. Whakahuihui Vercoe PCNZM MBE (1981–2004) – also Pīhopa Aporei / Co-Presiding Bishop (Māori), 1998–2004; then Te Pīhopa Mātāmua / Primate and Archbishop of New Zealand, 2004–2006 — the first from the Māori Church.
5. Brown Turei ONZM (2005–2017), Te Pīhopa o Te Tairāwhiti (1992–2017) – also Pīhopa Aporei / Co-Presiding Bishop (Māori), 2005–2006; then Pīhopa Mātāmua / Primate and Archbishop, 2006 onwards. Turei announced his intention retire as Māori archbishop on 31 March 2017, but died in office on 9 January 2017.
6. Don Tamihere (2018–present), Te Pīhopa o Te Tairāwhiti (since 2017), also Pīhopa Mātāmua / Primate and Archbishop.
