= Wai Quayle =

Waitohiariki Quayle (born 1950) is a New Zealand Māori Anglican bishop. She was ordained as Bishop of Upoko o Te Ika in the Te Pīhopatanga o Aotearoa at Rathkeale College on 12 September 2019, where she also received a haka greeting from her community. She is the first female Māori bishop in the Anglican Church, and the first woman born in New Zealand to become a bishop in the Anglican Communion. Her primary cares are housing, health needs, and youth suicide risk and empowerment.

== Personal life ==
She was born in Gladstone, a farming community. Her labourer father was Anglican and her mother a Mormon. She had 12 brothers and sisters, with names reflecting different parts of the land where they grew up. She has links with both Ngāti Kahungunu and Whakatōhea tribes. She had little connection with a physical church in her young life, in that an Anglican priest rather would visit her family home with all the labourers that would stay with them. Mormon elders would also stop by. It was not until she was 16, when her mother died, that her godfather, would take her to a church, Te Hepara Pai, in Masterton once a month. It was there that she met her husband, Colin Quayle, a Pākehā, who was confirmed in the faith there shortly before his death.

Quayle was married at age 19 and has three adult children. She was widowed in 1990, when Colin got a brain tumour at age 38. She received her bachelor's degree in bicultural social work from Te Wānanga o Aotearoa when she was in her mid 50s.

Prior to being ordained bishop in 2019, Quayle held the role of Māori community health services manager at Whaiora Māori Health based in Masterton, where she oversaw staff managing multiple government health contracts.

== Ordained ministry ==
When Te Hepara Pai was struggling and deciding if it should stay open or close, Quayle stepped into her first role there as a minister.

Theologically, Quayle respects both the Māori culture belief in a number of gods, and Christianity's belief in one, and admittedly continues to work through that disconnection herself.

Having been ordained a deacon in 2013, and ordained as a priest in 2014 by Muru Walters, Quayle was Archdeacon of Wairarapa from 2015 to 2019.

Archbishop Don Tamihere was joined as celebrant for the ordination by Archbishop Fereimi Cama, Archbishop Philip Richardson and the Assistant Bishop of Adelaide Denise Ferguson for the ordination of Quayle in 2019.

On 4 April 2020, along with Archbishop Don Tamihere, Quayle presided over New Zealand's first virtual commissioning service, which occurred at Taranaki Cathedral of St Mary. It also marked the occasion of Jacqui Paterson being the first woman to become Dean of Taranaki; and Jay Ruka, – of Te Āti Awa, Ngāti Mutunga, Ngāti Koata and Ngā Puhi – becoming the first Māori leader to take up the role.

Quayle has been on the board of Papawai and Kaikōkirikiri Trusts since 2001, and serving as chair since 2011, representing the Anglican Church, which deals with lands vested to the trust by the Papawai and Kaikōkirikiri Trusts Act 1943. The group's core business is land based asset management that also annually contributes to education and scholarships.
