= Benjamin Dudley =

Benjamin Dudley may refer to:

- Benjamin Dudley (Archdeacon of Rangiora) (1805–1892), New Zealand Anglican priest
- Benjamin Dudley (Archdeacon of Auckland) (1838–1901), New Zealand Anglican priest
- Benjamin F. Dudley (born 1969), American politician
- Benjamin Winslow Dudley (1785–1870), American surgeon and academic

== See also ==
- Benjamin D. Pritchard (1835–1907), middle name Dudley, American army officer
- Benjamin Dudley Tarlton (1849–1919), American lawyer and judge
- Dudley (surname)
