= Te Pīhopatanga o Te Upoko o Te Ika =

Diocese of Te Upoko o Te Ika Māori: Te Pīhopatanga o Te Upoko o Te Ika
- Bishopric
- Incumbent: Wai Quayle
- Style: The Right Reverend

Location
- Country: New Zealand
- Territory: North Island
- Ecclesiastical province: Aotearoa, New Zealand and Polynesia
- Headquarters: Palmerston North
- Coordinates: 40°48′S 175°05′E

Statistics
- Population: Total: (as of 2001); 14,000

Information
- First holder: Muru Walters
- Formation: 7 March 1992
- Denomination: Anglican
- Cathedral: Te Papa-i-o-uru Marae
- Language: Māori, English

Current leadership
- Parent church: Anglican Communion
- Major Archbishop: Primate of New Zealand; Pīhopa Mātāmua
- Pīhopa: Wai Quayle

Te Pīhopatanga o Te Upoko o Te Ika is an episcopal polity or diocese of the Anglican Church in Aotearoa, New Zealand and Polynesia. Literally, the diocese is the Anglican bishopric of the head of the fish in the lower and western regions of the North Island of Aotearoa, New Zealand; also known as the synod (or in Māori: Te Hui Amorangi).

According to a 2001 census, there were approximately 14,000 Māori Anglicans living in these regions.

Te Manawa o Te Wheke is one of five pīhopatanga, or episcopal units, that comprise Te Pīhopatanga o Aotearoa, the Māori Anglican Church in Aotearoa, New Zealand.

== Ministry ==
There are several rohe, or ministry units, within Te Pīhopatanga o Te Upoko o Te Ika. These are:

- Taranaki-ki-te-Tonga
- Taranaki
- Wainui-a-rua
- Aotea-Kurahaupo
- Manawatu-Rangitikei
- Poneke
- Te Awakairangi
- Whitireia

== Bishops ==
The first bishop, Te Pīhopa o Te Upoko o Te Ika, was Muru Walters, from his consecration on 7 March 1992 until his retirement in 2018 and the administrator manager is Teri-Rori Kirkwood. On 4 May 2019, it was announced that Wai Quayle, Archdeacon of Wairarapa (in Te Pīhopatanga), was to become the next Pīhopa; she took her See with her consecration as a bishop on 12 September at Masterton by Don Tamihere, Archbishop and Primate of New Zealand, Te Pīhopa o Aotearoa and Te Pīhopa o Te Tairāwhiti (with his fellow-Primates Philip Richardson and Fereimi Cama). Quayle was made deacon in 2013 and ordained priest in 2014, by Walters in Masteron.
