= Whakahuihui Vercoe =

Whakahuihui Vercoe PCNZM MBE
- Primate and Archbishop; Māori: Pīhopa Mātāmua
- Church: Anglican Church in Aotearoa, New Zealand and Polynesia
- In office: 2004–2006
- Predecessor: John Paterson
- Successor: Brown Turei
- Other post: Bishop of Aotearoa (1981–2004)

Orders
- Ordination: 1952
- Consecration: 1981

Personal details
- Born: 4 June 1928 Tōrere, Bay of Plenty, North Island, New Zealand
- Died: 13 September 2007 (aged 79) Lynmore, near Rotorua, North Island, New Zealand
- Buried: Tōrere urupa
- Denomination: Anglican
- Spouse: Doris Eivers (m. 1951)
- Children: 3 sons
- Occupation: Educator; cleric
- Education: Tōrere Native School; Feilding Agricultural High School
- Alma mater: University of Canterbury; College House

Whakahuihui "Hui" Vercoe PCNZM MBE (4 June 1928 – 13 September 2007) was an Anglican bishop in New Zealand. He was the Archbishop of New Zealand from 2004 to 2006, the first person from the Māori church to hold that office. He was also Bishop of Aotearoa from 1981, the first person to be elected to that position by the congregation rather than being appointed by the church hierarchy. He held both offices until his retirement in 2006. He was also the first person to become a Principal Companion of the New Zealand Order of Merit after the rank was introduced in 2000.

== Early life ==
Vercoe was born in Tōrere, a coastal Māori village (kāinga) near Ōpōtiki in the Eastern Bay of Plenty, in the North Island, to Joseph Vercoe and Wyness Williams. He was named Whakahuihui ("to gather together") to record the crowds that gathered to pay their respects to his grandmother, who died on the day he was born. His paternal grandfather, Henry Vercoe, was a Cornish farmer and settler in New Zealand. His father left the family soon after he was born, and he was raised by his mother and maternal grandfather, a Māori farmer, in a small earthen-floored shack (kauta). He was educated at Tōrere Native School, Feilding Agricultural High School, and the University of Canterbury in Christchurch, before studying theology at College House (which was still theologically oriented).

== Clerical career ==
Vercoe was ordained as a deacon in 1951 and as a priest in the Anglican Church of New Zealand in 1952. He served as a parish priest in, successively, Wellington, Wairarapa, and Rangitikei. He became politically active, and supported the "No Maoris No Tour" movement in 1960, which complained that no Māori were permitted to join the All Blacks rugby tour to South Africa that year.

He joined the New Zealand Army in 1960, and became a military chaplain. He ministered to New Zealand forces in Malaya from 1961 to 1963, and the ANZAC Brigade in Vietnam from 1968 to 1969, and was chaplain at Burnham Military Camp from 1965 to 1971. In the 1970 New Year Honours, he was appointed a Member of the Order of the British Empire. He was Principal of Te Waipounamu Girls' School from 1971 to 1976, and then Vicar in Ohinemutu from 1976 to 1978. He was promoted to become Archdeacon of Tairāwhiti and Vicar-General to Te Pīhopatanga o (the bishopric of) Aotearoa in 1978.

== Episcopal ministry ==
Vercoe was consecrated as Bishop of Aotearoa (Pīhopa o Aotearoa) at Houmaitawhiti Marae in Rotorua in 1981.

He was a leading advocate of Māori rights and supporter of the Treaty of Waitangi. On Waitangi Day in 1990, the 150th anniversary of the Treaty, he complained in a speech attended by Dame Te Arikinui Dame Te Atairangikaahu, Queen Elizabeth II, the Governor-General Paul Reeves, and Prime Minister Geoffrey Palmer, that the promises made in the Treaty had not been honoured by The Crown. As a result of the continuing tensions between the different peoples of New Zealand, he also opposed immigration to New Zealand.

He was in favour of separate public institutions – such as schools – for Māori people, and in 1980 became the first head of the Māori people in the Anglican Church in New Zealand to be elected, rather than appointed by the church hierarchy. The Anglican Church in New Zealand created three sections in 1992, one for the Māori, another for European New Zealanders (known in Māori as Pākehā), and a third for Polynesians, recognising the three separate cultural traditions (tikanga) in New Zealand, Fiji, Tonga, Samoa, and the Cook Islands. Vercoe became head of the Māori tikanga, Te Pīhopatanga o Aotearoa.

Vercoe was appointed a Principal Companion of the New Zealand Order of Merit (the equivalent of a knighthood), for services to Māori and the community, in the 2000 Queen's Birthday Honours, and became Primate and Archbishop of Aotearoa, New Zealand and Polynesia (Pihopa Matamua) in 2004. As required by the church constitution at the time, he resigned as Te Pihopa o Aoteatoa in 2004.

He held conservative religious views, condemning homosexuality as "unnatural" and "an abomination". A storm of controversy erupted in June 2004 when the New Zealand Herald reported his vision of a "world without gays". He ordained women as priests, but opposed the ordination of women as bishops and refused to attend the first ordination of a woman as a bishop in New Zealand in 1991, when Penny Jamieson became Bishop of Dunedin.

He was diagnosed with cancer of the brain in 2005 and retired due to ill health in 2006. After he stepped down, the office of Archbishop has been shared by the heads of the three tikanga, with William Brown Turei as Primate.

== Private life and death ==
Vercoe married Doris Eivers in 1951. They had three sons. He died in Lynmore, near Rotorua, his home for over 20 years, on 13 September 2007. He was survived by his wife and their sons. After a farewell ceremony at St Faith's Church in Rotorua on 14 September, his tangi (funeral) at Tōrere Marae was attended by over 40 Anglican bishops. He was buried at the Tōrere urupa (burial ground) on 17 September.

In August 2009, Vercoe's widow, Doris, was granted the use of the courtesy title of "Lady Vercoe", following the re-introduction of titular honours by the New Zealand government. She died in February 2016.

Religious titles
Preceded by John Paterson	Primate and Archbishop of Aotearoa, New Zealand and Polynesia; 2004–2006	Succeeded by William Brown Turei
Preceded by Manuhuia Bennett	Bishop of Aotearoa; 1981–2004	Succeeded by William Brown Turei
