= Hukarere Girls' College =

School in New Zealand

Location
- 31 Napier Road, Havelock North, New Zealand; 39.6678°S 176.8794°E

Information
- Type: State integrated, single sex female, secondary (Year 9–13) with boarding facilities
- Motto: Kia Ū Ki Te Pai; Cleave to that which is good Abhor that which is evil
- Established: July 1875
- Ministry of Education Institution no.: 435
- Principal: Evelyn Leef
- Enrolment: 53 (July 2026)
- Socio-economic decile: 2F
- Website: hukarere.ac.nz

Hukarere Girls' College is a girls secondary boarding school in the Hawke's Bay Region of New Zealand. It has a strong Māori character and follows the Anglican tradition. The School motto "Kia Ū Ki Te Pai" means "Cleave to that which is good" or "Abhor that which is evil" (Romans 12 verse 9, New Testament of the Bible).

The school opened in July 1875 under the name Hukarere Native School for Girls, then became Hukarere Girls’ School and from 1970 to 1992 it was known as Hukarere Hostel, as during this period of time the students attended Napier Girls' High School. The school was re-established in 1993 and is known as Hukarere Girls’ College. In 2003, the College relocated to Herepoho in Eskdale, just outside Napier. In 2023, the school faced significant damage from Cyclone Gabrielle and was subsequently relocated to its current home in Havelock North.

In 2016 the principal said that academic success pass rate for the three National Certificate of Educational Achievement (NCEA) levels is 100%.

== Early history of the school ==
Bishop William Williams worked with his son-in-law Samuel Williams to establish the girls’ school as a related school to Te Aute College, which they had established in 1854. The school was first established in August 1875 on a site in Hukarere Road, Napier near to Bishop Williams' house. Samuel was gifted £700 from his aunt Catherine Heathcote to build Hukarere School. William Williams donated the site, with a small government grant, assistance from the Te Aute estate and Catherine Heathcote, the building began in 1874 and was completed by July 1875.

Mrs. Ingleton was the first teacher and matron. When the school opened there were seven students, the next year the role increased to 30 and by 1877 there were 60 students at the school. The operations of the school were supported by three of Bishop Williams’s daughters. Anna Maria Williams, known as 'Miss Maria', as the superintendent of the school; she kept the accounts, managed the correspondence and taught English and the Scriptures. She was assisted by her sisters, Lydia Catherine ('Miss Kate') and Marianne ('Miss Mary Anne').

Mrs. Turner and her daughter were appointed as matron and teacher in September 1876. The school was enlarged more than once, to cope with the increased attendance. Mrs. and Miss Turner resigned at the end of June 1881. Their places were taken by Misses Hamilton and Evans, who retired at the end of 1883. They were succeeded by Misses Foster and Minton, and in September 1885, Miss Foster's place was taken by Miss Shouls. During 1886 Miss Agnes Downs, who had been one of the school's original pupils (enrolling in 1875), began her work as an assistant teacher. Her involvement with the school continued for 24 years; she became the first Māori head teacher. The Hukarere School was carried on under the personal supervision of the Misses Williams. Maria Williams believed that she had achieved a desirable balance in her curriculum; one of academic study and practical skills, although the Inspectors of Native Schools wanted the curriculum to focus on practical skills.

During 1892 it was decided to bring the Hukarere Native Girls' School under the Te Aute Trust Board, and from that date the Trust contributed annually to the upkeep of the Hukarere School. The Hukarere Maori Girls' School Act 1892 established the statutory basis for the organisation of the school. Archdeacon Samuel Williams, on 23 January 1893, signed the conveyance of the Hukarere School property to the Te Aute Trust Board.

In 1899 Jane Helena Bulstrode, from England, was appointed principal. Two years later her sister, Emily Mary Bulstrode, joined her as head teacher. The Bulstrode sisters maintained the emphasis on a Christian education with training in domestic skills and also encouraged students to enter university and to train as nurses and teachers.

Mereana Tangata (Mereana Hattaway) (1869-1929), was probably the first Māori nursing graduate at Auckland Hospital. By 1903 three old girls had trained as nurses at Napier Hospital and six old girls had trained as teachers. However government policy, such staffing of the district health nursing scheme which was implementation in 1911, and also the control over the curriculum imposed by the Inspectors of Native Schools, had a negative effect on academic education in Māori denominational boarding schools and the career opportunities for Hukarere old girls.

== The school on Napier Terrace ==
The school buildings in Hukarere Road were destroyed in a fire early on 21 October 1910, without any loss of life. Temporary premises for the school in Burlington and Selwyn Roads were provided by the trustees of the Hawke's Bay Church Trust, the trustees of which also provided a larger site for the school at 46 Napier Terrace. The school had 55 students when it reopened on 18 July 1912 under the charge of the Misses Bulstrode.

Mere Haana Hall, an old girl of the school, was the principal from 1927 to 1944. On 3 February 1931 the concrete buildings were damaged in the earthquake that devastated Napier. The students relocated to Carlile House in Auckland until 1932 while repairs were made to the buildings.

== Closure of the school in 1969 and of Hukarere Hostel in 1991 ==
In the late 1960s the Te Aute-Hukarere Trust Board faced financial pressures and in 1969 decided to close Hukarere as a school and operated the institution as a hostel with the students attending Napier Girls' High School. Then in 1991 the Board closed the hostel as the board was continuing to experience financial pressures in the operation of Te Aute College. The majority of the students went to Te Aute College. These decisions were controversial as a number of the supporters of Hukarere were of the view that the decisions to close the school, then the hostel, were made to ensure the survival of Te Aute College, however in both cases it was Te Aute that was in financial crisis not Hukarere.

== Re-establishment in 1993 and relocation to Eskdale ==
In February 1993, Hukarere re-opened at 46 Napier Terrace as a school and a hostel with a roll of 20 students.

In 2001 the decision was made that the school buildings were un-safe and a search began for another location. The site chosen for the school was at Herepoho in Shaw Road, which was in a largely rural area off the Napier-Taupo Highway a short distance from the intersection with State Highway 2, and close to the Esk River. On 27 April 2003 Hukarere relocated to the Herepoho, Eskdale site.

The 2019 Education Review Office review of the college described it as having two governing entities: the Hukarere College Board of Trustees, which is responsible for the educational functions of the college; and the Te Aute Trust Proprietors Board, representing the Anglican Church - the Te Aute Trust Proprietors Board is the owner of the school buildings and is responsible for the operation of the hostel. The daily operations of the hostel is managed by a sub-committee made up of school board members and staff. The St John’s College Trust Board in Auckland provides ongoing support to the Hukarere College Board of Trustees.

== Relocation to Havelock North ==
In February 2023, the students were evacuated from the boarding hostel hours before the Esk River flooded the school grounds due to the torrential rain from Cyclone Gabrielle. The school was subsequently relocated to its current home in Havelock North.

== St. Michael and All Angels’ Chapel ==
The St. Michael and All Angels’ Chapel was consecrated on 1 November 1953 at Mataruahou in Napier Terrace. It was described as being "decorated by the finest carving, panelling and scroll-work, the building has little in New Zealand church architecture to equal it." Sir Āpirana Ngata guided the design of the chapel.

The chapel was a gift to the school from the Hukarere Old Girls' Association. The decoration of the interior of the chapel was directed by Arihia Ngata and Mrs R. Paenga with the students involved in the weaving of the tukutuku panels, using traditional materials. The carving was carried out in Gisborne by John Taiapa with the assistance of Derek Mortis, Riki Smith and Bill Paddy. The painting of the kowhaiwhai designs was carried out by Jack Kingi.

When the school was relocated the tukutuku panels and other decorations were dismantled and put into storage. The Hukarere Old Girls' Association is engaged in fundraising to build a chapel.

== Enrolment ==
As of July 2026, Hukatere Girls' College has a roll of 53 students, of which 53 (100.0%) identify as Māori.

As of 2026, the school has an Equity Index of 542, placing it amongst schools whose students have the most socioeconomic barriers to achievement (roughly equivalent to deciles 1 and 2 under the former socio-economic decile system).

== School principals and head teachers ==
- Anna Maria Williams (superintendent) from 1875 to 1899
- Jane Helena Bulstrode – was appointed the principal in 1899 and Emily Mary Bulstrode was appointed head teacher in 1901
- Mere Haana Hall – appointed principal in 1927
- Isabel Mary Boyle – appointed principal in 1945
- Isa Hunter – appointed principal in 1948
- Lucy Granville Hogg – principal from 1964 to 1969
- Ruth Flashoff – principal from 1970 to 1973
- Des Langigan was the acting administrator and Awhina Waaka was the curriculum director and acting principal when the school was re-established in 1993; assisted by Ross Himona and Alyson Bullock
- Kuini Jenkins – acting principal 1995
- Heather Moller – appointed principal in 2001
- Lelie Jackson-Pearcey – appointed principal in 2013
- Caron Taana - appointed acting principal in 2023
- Evelyn Leef - appointed principal in 2025

== Notable alumnae ==
- Hana Te Unuhi Mere Paaka (Hannah Mary Park) (? – August 1909) – Te Ati Awa; wife of Bishop Bennett.
- Mereana Tangata (Mereana Hattaway) (1869–1929) – Te Rarawa; graduated as a nurse in 1896 (number 252 on the Auckland Hospital register as Mary Ann Helena Leonard), probably the first Māori nursing graduate.
- Makereti Papakura (1873–1930) – Tuhourangi; cultural guide at Whakarewarewa, Rotorua, known as 'Guide Maggie Papakura'; ethnographer. In 2025, Oxford University posthumously awarded Papakura a Master of Philosophy (MPhil) in anthropology for her work documenting the life, language and customs of her Te Arawa people.
- Mere Haana Hall (1880/1881?–1966) – Ngāti Rangiwewehi; first Māori woman principal of a major secondary girls’ school in New Zealand. Awarded MBE. Mere Hana Whare, a house at Hukarere, is named after her.
- Materoa Reedy (1881–1944) – Ngāti Porou community leader; composer and performer of waiata.
- Reremoana Hakiwai (1889–1981) – Rongowhakaata and Ngāti Porou community leader. Reremoana Whare, a house at Hukarere, is named after her.
- Rangitiaria Dennan (1897–1970) – Ngati Tarawhai; cultural guide at Whakarewarewa, Rotorua; known as 'Guide Rangi'.
- Emere Kaa (Emere Makere Waiwaha Mountain) (1901–1996) – Ngāti Porou; health educator, known as 'Nurse Kaa'. Made a Companion of the Queen's Service Order (QSO) in the 1979 Birthday Honours.
- Emarina Manuel (1915–1996) – Ngāti Kahungunu community leader and Māori welfare officer. Awarded QSO MBE.
- Kōhine Pōnika (1920–1990), Ngāti Porou and Tūhoe; composer.
- Meremere Paitai (Meremere Petricevich) (1920–2011) – Te Rarawa community leader; primary school teacher; founding member of the Māori Women's Welfare League.
- Ngoi Pēwhairangi (1921–1985) – Ngāti Porou and Ngāti Koi; prominent teacher of, and advocate for Māori language and culture, and the composer of many songs including Poi E and E Ipo. Awarded QSM.
- Pa Tepaeru Terito Ariki or Pa Tepaeru-a-Tupe, (1923–1990) was Pa Ariki, one of the two ariki titles of the Takitumu tribe on the island of Rarotonga of the Cook Islands. She is one of the authors of "Te Atua Mou E" ("God is Truth"), the national anthem of the Cook Islands. She was president of the House of Ariki from 1980 to 1990.
- Dame Iritana Tāwhiwhirangi (born 1928) – Ngāti Porou community leader; advocate of Māori language education and the Kohanga Reo movement. Awarded DNZM MBE.
- Jean Gloria Edith Puketapu or Jean Puketapu-Waiwai (1931–2012) was a Ngāi Tūhoe Māori language activist and co-founder of the first kōhanga reo. Awarded QSO.
- Manihira Te Ra Purewa Royal (Hira Royal) was born in Otaki in 1932. She was involved in the Anglican Church, as Kaikaraka (Deacon) and was ordained as a priest by Muru Walters, Te Pīhopa o Te Upoko o Te Ika (Bishop of the Head of the Fish), at the Rangiātea Church in 1996. She completed her religious study at Te Wānanga o Raukawa and St John's College, Auckland.
- Linda Waimarie Nikora – Te Aitanga a Hauiti and Ngāi Tūhoe; professor of psychology and indigenous studies.
