= Ngarahu Katene =

Māori Anglican bishop

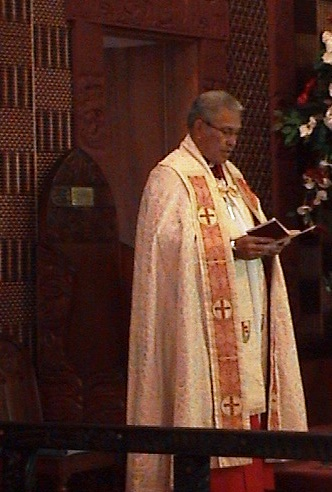
Bishop Katene

Ngarahu Katene is a Māori Anglican bishop. He has been the incumbent of the Episcopal polity of Te Pīhopatanga o Te Manawa o Te Wheke since 2005.

Religious titles
Preceded by Te Whakahuihui Vercoe	Pīhopa o Te Manawa o Te Whekee; 2005–present	Incumbent
