= Tairāwhiti =

Tairāwhiti or Tai Rawhiti may refer to:

- Te Tai Rāwhiti, the customary Māori name for the Gisborne District
- A District health board of New Zealand in that region
- Te Tai Rawhiti, a former New Zealand parliamentary Māori electorate
- Te Pīhopatanga o Te Tairāwhiti, a Māori bishopric of the Anglican Church in Aotearoa, New Zealand and Polynesia.
- The Gisborne Tairawhiti rugby league team
