= William Newnham (engineer) =

New Zealand civil engineer

William Langston Newnham CBE (14 October 1888 – 15 March 1974) was a New Zealand civil engineer and engineering administrator. He was a key member of the Public Works Department for over forty years, working on the railways, including the Napier–Gisborne railway, Rimutaka deviation, the North Auckland main trunk, [the Stratford–main trunk link and the Otira rail tunnel. For many years he was a member of the Engineers Registration Board set up by the Engineers Registration Act 1924.

In the 1952 New Year Honours Newnham was appointed a Commander of the Order of the British Empire.
