= Brown Turei =

Archbishop of New Zealand (1924–2017)

The Most Reverend Brown Turei ONZM
- Primate of New Zealand and Archbishop; Te Pīhopa o Aotearoa and Te Pīhopa o Te Tairāwhiti
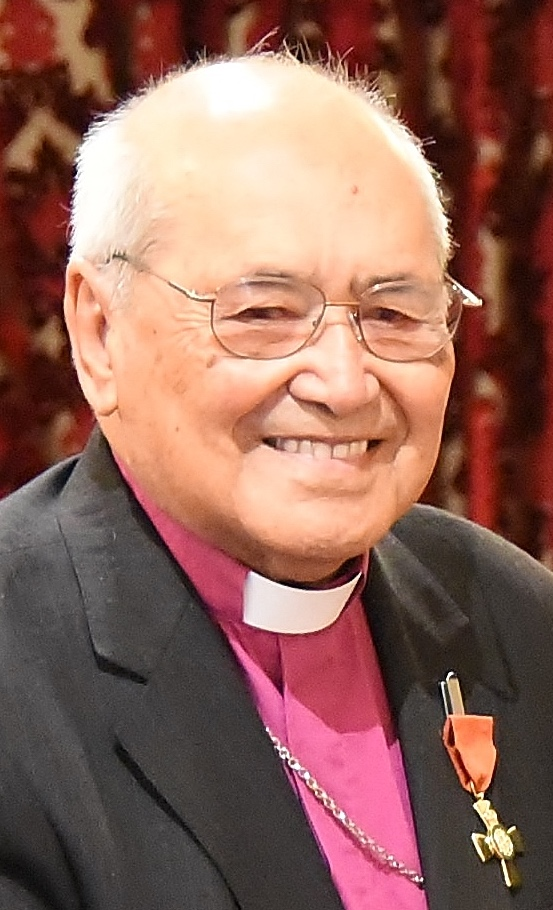
- Turei in 2016
- Province: Anglican Church in Aotearoa, New Zealand and Polynesia
- Diocese: Te Pīhopatanga o Te Tairāwhiti
- In office: 2006–2017 (Primate); 2005–2017 (Aotearoa); 1992–2017 (Tairāwhiti)

Personal details
- Born: 12 December 1924 Ōpōtiki, New Zealand
- Died: 9 January 2017 (aged 92) Gisborne, New Zealand
- Denomination: Anglicanism
- Spouse: Mihi Turei
- Education: Saint John’s College

William Brown Turei ONZM (12 December 1924 – 9 January 2017) was the Archbishop, Te Pīhopa o Aotearoa/Bishop of Aotearoa (senior bishop of the Māori Tikanga) and Primate/Te Pīhopa Mataamua of the Anglican Church in Aotearoa, New Zealand and Polynesia. He shared the primacy with Philip Richardson, archbishop for the New Zealand dioceses, and Winston Halapua, Bishop of Polynesia.

== Biography ==
=== Childhood and education ===
Turei was born in 1924 in Ōpōtiki, to the Waititi whānau. He became a whāngai to the Turei whanau in Cape Runaway, on the East Cape. He was named after the Reverend Brown Turei, a Hāhi Mihinare priest on the east coast.

He spent his primary school years at Rangitukia and Cape Runaway and studied at Te Aute College for four years. He briefly attended College House, Christchurch, before enlisting with C Company of the 28 Maori Battalion to serve in World War II. After the war, he attended St John's College, Auckland and was ordained a priest in 1950.

On 15 October 2009, Turei was selected by Te Aute College to be a part of its 1st XV leaders group. The honour is given to former pupils over the age of 55 who have made a significant contribution to Māori society. Turei attended Te Aute College from 1939 to 1943.

=== Ordained ministry ===
Turei served the Anglican Church in parishes and Maori pastorates in Tauranga, Whangara, Te Puke, Whakatāne, Manutuke, Christchurch and Waipatu. He was appointed Archdeacon of Tairāwhiti in 1982 and has had a long association with Hukarere Girls College, becoming chaplain there in 1984. He was also chaplain of the Napier Prison for four years.

In 1992 Turei was elected as Te Pīhopa o Te Tai Rāwhiti, following the reforms of the Anglican Church in 1990; he was duly consecrated a bishop on 7 March 1992. In February 2005 he was elected to succeed Whakahuihui Vercoe as Pihopa o Aotearoa (Senior Bishop of Tikanga Maori), at a hui at Turangawaewae; the requisite confirmation (by General Synod) of that election was announced on 6 March 2005; at the Church's 57th General Synod (May 2006), it was decided that the senior bishop of each of the three tikanga would become co-equal and joint Primate—Archbishop of the whole church, but that (while the necessary legislative changes were made) Turei would be appointed de jure sole Archbishop (and Moxon and Bryce Co-Presiding Bishops). On 11 May he was installed alongside David Moxon and Jabez Leslie Bryce; the necessary changes made, Moxon and Bryce became his lawful co-equals in 2008.

In the 2016 New Year Honours, Turei was appointed an Officer of the New Zealand Order of Merit for services to the Anglican Church.

In August 2016, Turei announced that he would retire as te Pihopa o Tairāwhiti by the year's end, and as Maori archbishop in March 2017. However, he died before that date, on 9 January 2017, in Gisborne. He was 92 years old.

=== Family ===
Turei was married to Mihi (née King) and they had three children.

Religious titles
Preceded by Whakahuihui Vercoe	Bishop of Aotearoa; 2005–2017	Succeeded by Donald Tamihere
