= Ben Te Haara =

Māori Anglican bishop (1932–2021)

Waiohau Rui "Ben" Te Haara (23 March 1932 – 26 January 2021) was a Māori Anglican bishop. He was the first Pīhopa (bishop) of Te Pīhopatanga o Te Tai Tokerau from his 7 March 1992 consecration until 2001. A residential retreat building at Vaughan Park Retreat Centre in Auckland is named after him.
