= Mere Haana Hall =

New Zealand teacher and principal (c.1881–1966)

Mere Haana Hall MBE (c.1881 – 23 August 1966) was a New Zealand teacher and principal. Of Māori descent, she identified with the Ngāti Rangiwewehi iwi, part of the Te Arawa confederation. She was born in Tauranga in about 1881. She attended Hukarere Native School for Girls and from 1927 to 1944 she was the principal of Hukarere.

In the 1952 New Year Honours, Hall was appointed a Member of the Order of the British Empire for services to the Māori people.
