= Wiremu Panapa =

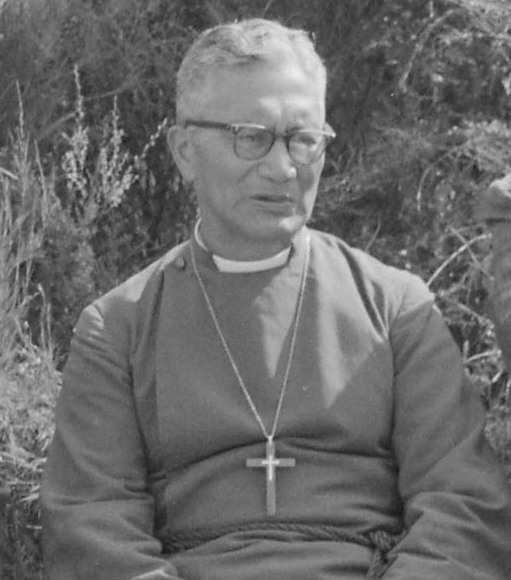
The Right Reverend Wiremu Panapa

Wiremu Netana Panapa CBE (1898–1970) was a New Zealand Anglican Suffragan Bishop in the second half of the 20th century.

He was born on 7 June 1898, educated at St John's College, Auckland and ordained in 1921. After curacies in the Diocese of Auckland he was its Māori Diocesan Missioner.

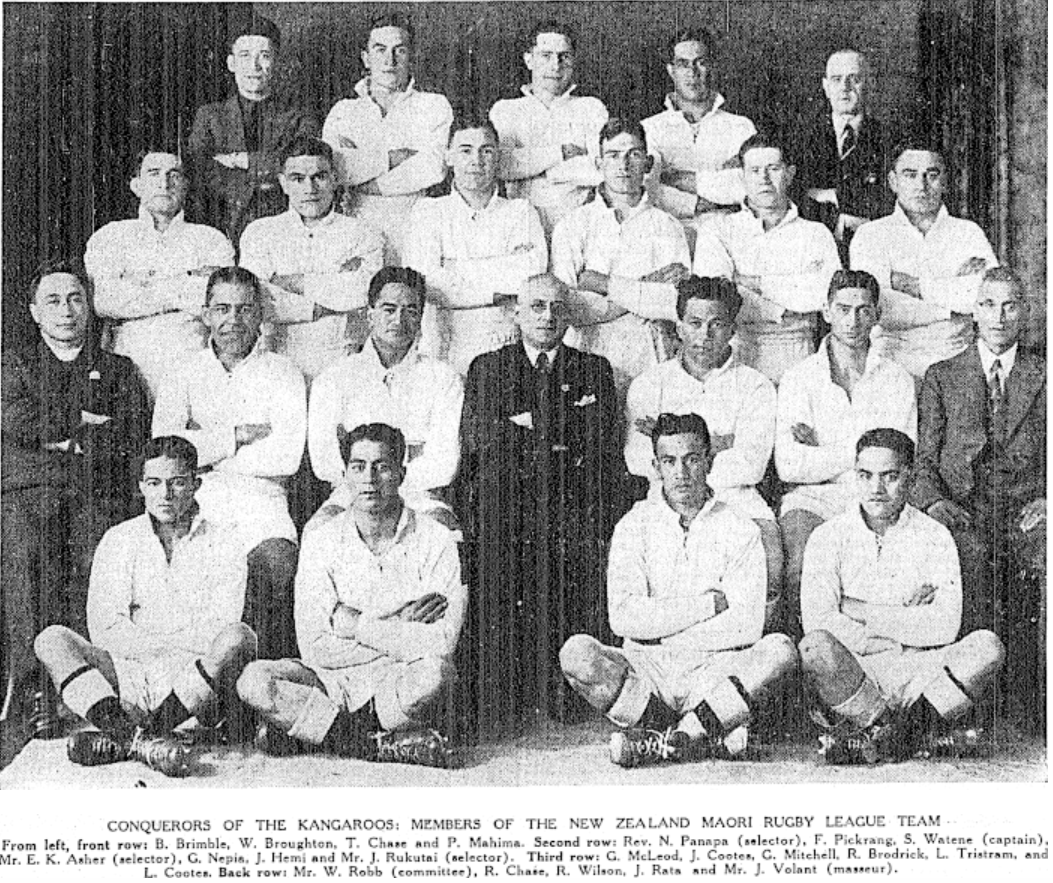
Wiremu Panapa seated on the left of the New Zealand Māori rugby league team photo in 1937.

In 1937 he was a selector for the New Zealand Māori rugby league team along with Jim Rukutai, and Ernie Asher.

During World War II he was a chaplain to the New Zealand Forces. When peace returned he held incumbencies in Rotorua and Taupō before being appointed Suffragan Bishop of Aotearoa in 1951. In 1953, Panapa was awarded the Queen Elizabeth II Coronation Medal. In the 1954 New Year Honours, he was appointed a Commander of the Order of the British Empire. He retired in 1967 (before 29 October) and died on 10 June 1970.

== Notes ==
Religious titles
Preceded by Frederick Augustus Bennett	Bishop of Aotearoa; 1951–1968	Succeeded by Manuhuia Augustus Bennett
