= 1952 New Year Honours (New Zealand) =

Annual awards for New Zealanders

The 1952 New Year Honours in New Zealand were appointments by King George VI on the advice of the New Zealand government to various orders and honours to reward and highlight good works by New Zealanders. The awards celebrated the passing of 1951 and the beginning of 1952, and were announced on 1 January 1952.

The recipients of honours are displayed here as they were styled before their new honour.

== Knight Bachelor ==
- Vincent Robert Sissons Meredith – of Auckland. For public services, particularly as Crown Prosecutor.
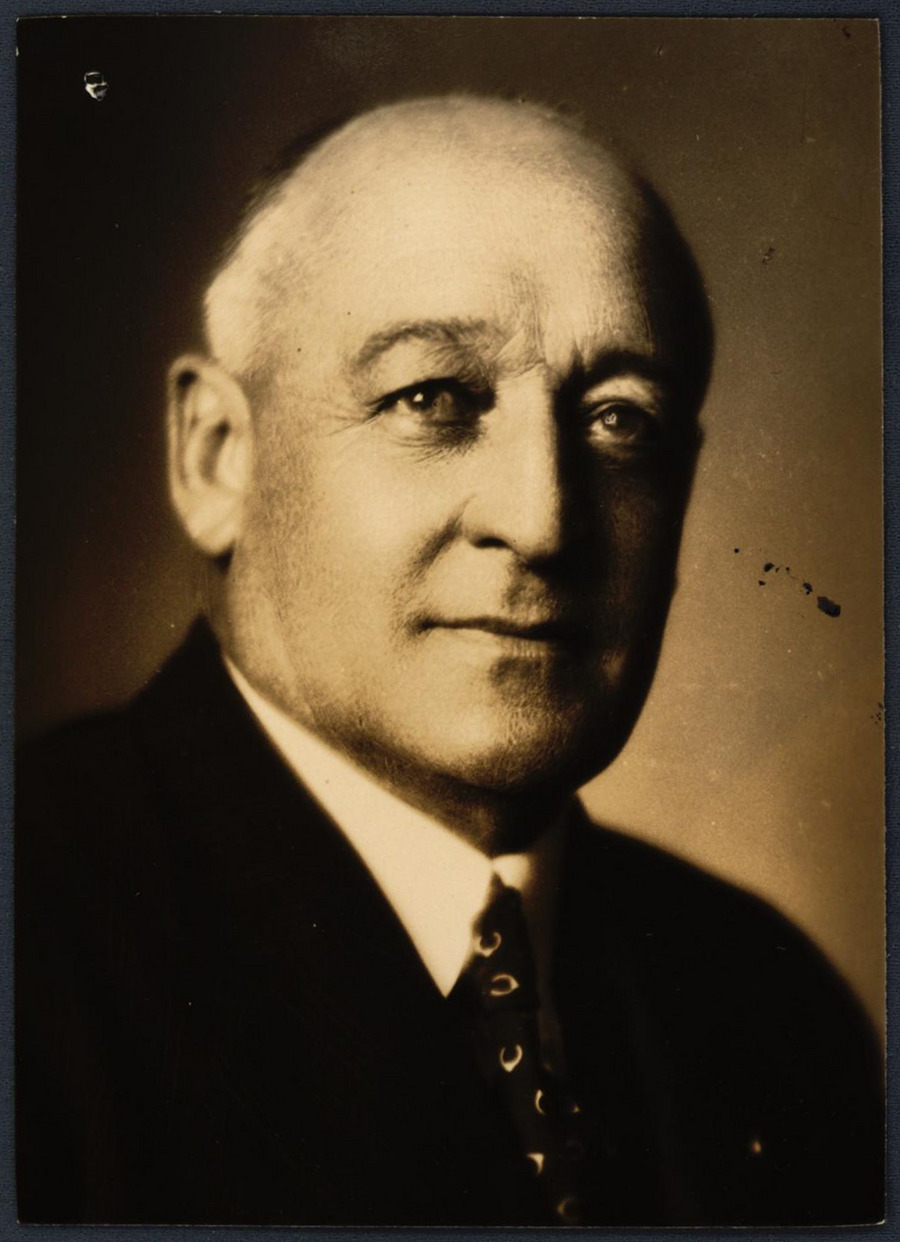
Sir Vincent Meredith

== Order of the British Empire ==
=== Knight Commander (KBE) ===
Civil division

- David Alexander Ewen OBE – of Lower Hutt. For public services.

=== Commander (CBE) ===
Civil division

- Henry Ernest Blyde JP – of Lepperton, Taranaki. For services to agriculture.
- Arthur Paul Harper – of Wellington. For services to the community.
- William Langston Newnham MICE MNZIE – chairman of the Soil Conservation and River Control Council.
- Albert Hamilton Tocker – of Christchurch. For services to education.

Military division

- Group Captain George Carter OBE – Royal New Zealand Air Force.

=== Officer (OBE) ===
Civil division

- John Leonard Coakley – of Auckland. For services to local government.
- Muriel Helen Deem MD ChB – of Dunedin; medical adviser to the Royal New Zealand Society for the Health of Women and Children (Plunket Society).
- Trevor Morrin Geddis – of Napier. For services to local government and journalism.
- Harry Samuel James Goodman – of Christchurch. For services to the boy scout movement and in the field of sport.
- Hazel Hamilton – matron of St Helen's Hospital, Wellington, and the senior midwifery matron in New Zealand.
- James Hogg – of Dunedin. For services to the community.
- John Edwin Hunt JP – of Wellington. For services to the community.
- James Melling – of Auckland. For services to local government.
- George Alexander Monk JP – of Waikanae. For services to local government.
- Michael Joseph Moodabe – of Auckland. For philanthropic and patriotic services.
- Stanley Oliver – of Lower Hutt. For services to music.
- Henry Walter Shove. For services in connection with the activities of the New Zealand Young Men's Christian Association.

Military division

- Honorary Captain Victor Gordon Webb – Royal New Zealand Naval Reserve.
- Lieutenant-Colonel Arthur Scoltock Playle ED – New Zealand Territorial Force.
- Squadron Leader Ernest Charles Gartrell DFC – Royal New Zealand Air Force.
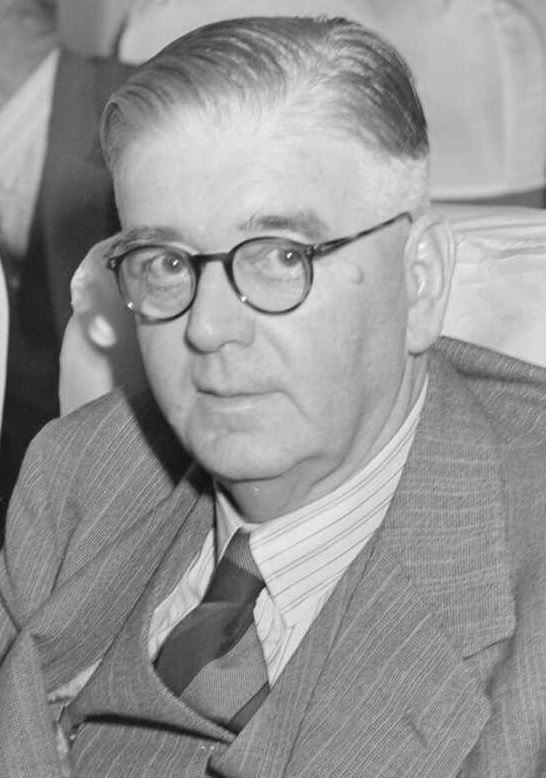
Leonard Coakley

=== Member (MBE) ===
Civil division

- Helen McKenzie Black – of Dunedin. For social welfare services.
- Elizabeth Harriet Bowie – of Milton. For services to the community.
- George Edward Brasell – of Lyttelton. For services to yachting.
- Euphemia Duncan Cornfoot – of Halcombe. For social welfare services.
- May Constance Gordon Hadfield – president of the Kindergarten Union of New Zealand.
- Mere Haana Hall – of Rotorua. For services to the Māori people.
- Dorothy Anstruther Hennessy ARRC – of Morven, Canterbury. For services to the New Zealand Red Cross Society.
- The Reverend Harry Alexander Johnson – of Auckland. For social welfare services.
- The Reverend Canon Wiremu Hone Keretene – of Otiria, North Auckland. For services to the Māori people.
- William Richard Lawrence MB ChB – a medical practitioner of Te Aroha.
- Inez Violet Lindesay – of Auckland. For social welfare services.
- Susie McGill – of Dunedin. For social welfare services.
- Michael Millar JP – of Invercargill. For services to the community.
- George Duncan Pedley – inspector of engine fitters, Naval Dockyard, Auckland.
- Basil Watson Potter. For services in connection with the activities of the New Zealand Young Men's Christian Association.
- Alexander David Ross – of Hastings. For services to the community.
- John Maurice Simson – of Howick. For public services.
- James Stonehouse JP – of Lower Hutt. For services to education.
- Julie Annie Tomlinson – of Nelson. For patriotic and social welfare services.
- Cora Hilda Wilding – of Kaikōura. For social welfare services.

Military division

- Lieutenant-Commander Ian Clendon Howard VRD – Royal New Zealand Naval Volunteer Reserve.
- George Reginald Wooding – temporary senior commissioned boatswain, Royal New Zealand Navy.
- Captain and Quartermaster Joseph William Beaumont – New Zealand Regiment.
- Warrant Officer 1st Class Ivan Joseph Doak – Royal New Zealand Artillery.
- Warrant Officer 2nd Class Robert John Maitland Loughnan – New Zealand Territorial Force.
- Squadron Leader John Walter Charles Love – Royal New Zealand Air Force.
- Flying Officer James McGuffie Costley – Royal New Zealand Air Force.
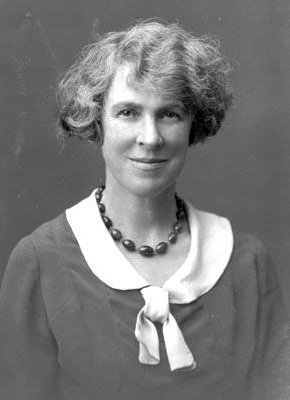
Cora Wilding

== British Empire Medal (BEM) ==
Military division

- Acting Petty Officer Hilton Edward Bravener Fowler – Royal New Zealand Navy.
- Chief Petty Officer Cook (S) Henry William Hansen – Royal New Zealand Navy.
- Chief Petty Officer Charles Duncan Holmstrom – Royal New Zealand Navy.
- Chief Radio Electrician Gordon Woods – Royal New Zealand Navy.
- Gunner Max Bluett – New Zealand Emergency Force.
- Flight Sergeant Douglas Robert Miller – Royal New Zealand Air Force.
- Sergeant Christopher Michael Richmond – Royal New Zealand Air Force.
- Corporal Jack Donald Bennett Gray – Royal New Zealand Air Force.
- Leading Aircraftman Thomas O'Regan – Royal New Zealand Air Force.

== Air Force Cross (AFC) ==
- Flight Lieutenant Ronald Charles Cecil Nairn DFM – Royal New Zealand Air Force.
- Flying Officer Douglas Forrester Clarke DFC – Royal New Zealand Air Force.

== King's Commendation for Valuable Service in the Air ==
- Flight Lieutenant Frank Edward Cooper – Royal New Zealand Air Force.
- Master Signaller Kenneth Thomas Gatrell – Royal New Zealand Air Force.
- Flight Sergeant Leslie Gordon Woods – Royal New Zealand Air Force.
