= Manuhuia Bennett =

New Zealand bishop

Right Reverend Manuhuia "Manu" Augustus Bennett ONZ CMG (10 February 1916 – 20 December 2001) was a New Zealand Anglican Bishop in the second half of the 20th century. He was born in Rotorua on 10 February 1916 into an ecclesiastical family: his father Frederick Augustus Bennett was the inaugural Bishop of Aotearoa. He identified with the Ngāti Whakaue, Ngāti Pikiao and Ngāti Rangitihi iwi. Educated at the University of Hawaiʻi and ordained in 1940, he was a Curate in the Diocese of Waiapu before becoming a Chaplain to the New Zealand Forces. When peace returned he was a Māori Missionary at Rangitīkei. Later he was Vicar of St Faith's Rotorua before being appointed Suffragan Bishop of Aotearoa in 1951. He was Bishop of Aotearoa from 1968 to 1981 and a member of the Waitangi Tribunal from 1986 to 1997. He died on 20 December 2001.

== Honours and awards ==
In 1977, Bennett was awarded the Queen Elizabeth II Silver Jubilee Medal. In the 1981 Queen's Birthday Honours, he was appointed a Commander of the Order of St Michael and St George. On 6 February 1989, Bennett was the eleventh appointee to the Order of New Zealand. The following year, he was awarded the New Zealand 1990 Commemoration Medal.

== Notes ==
Religious titles
Preceded by Wiremu Netana Panapa	Bishop of Aotearoa; 1966–1981	Succeeded by Whakahuihui Vercoe
