= Benjamin Dudley (Archdeacon of Rangiora) =

Benjamin Woolley Dudley (1805 – 28 August 1892) was a New Zealand Anglican priest in the 19th century.

Dudley was born in Dudley, Worcestershire, in late 1805. He was educated at St Catharine's College, Cambridge and ordained as a priest of the Church of England in 1838. He held curacies at Earnley, then Ticehurst. Emigrating to New Zealand on the Cressy, he became the incumbent at Lyttelton. In 1876 he became Archdeacon of Rangiora, where he remained until his death on 28 August 1892.

Dudley was one of the first purchasers of rural land in the Christchurch district, choosing rural section 40 near Lyttelton. His son, Benjamin Thornton Dudley, was Archdeacon of Waitemata, and later Auckland from 1883 to 1901.
