= Benjamin Dudley (Archdeacon of Auckland) =

Benjamin Thornton Dudley (30 November 1838 – 23 April 1901) was an eminent New Zealand Anglican priest in the second half of the 19th century.

Dudley was born Ticehurst as the son of The Rev. Benjamin Woolley Dudley, another eminent pioneer, he was educated at Marlborough College and Christ's College, Christchurch; and ordained in 1861. His first service was with Bishop Patteson's Melanesian Mission, after which he became Curate in charge at Parnell. In 1865 he was placed in charge of a new church, St Sepulchre, then Church of the Holy Sepulchre, Auckland when it outgrew its first building. In 1883 he became Archdeacon of Waitemata, and later Auckland. He died on 23 April 1901 in Auckland, and was buried at St Stephen's Cemetery in Parnell.
