= Te Kitohi Pikaahu =

New Zealand Māori Bishop

The Right Reverend Te Kitohi Pikaahu ONZM
- Bishop of Te Tai Tokerau (Northland-Auckland)
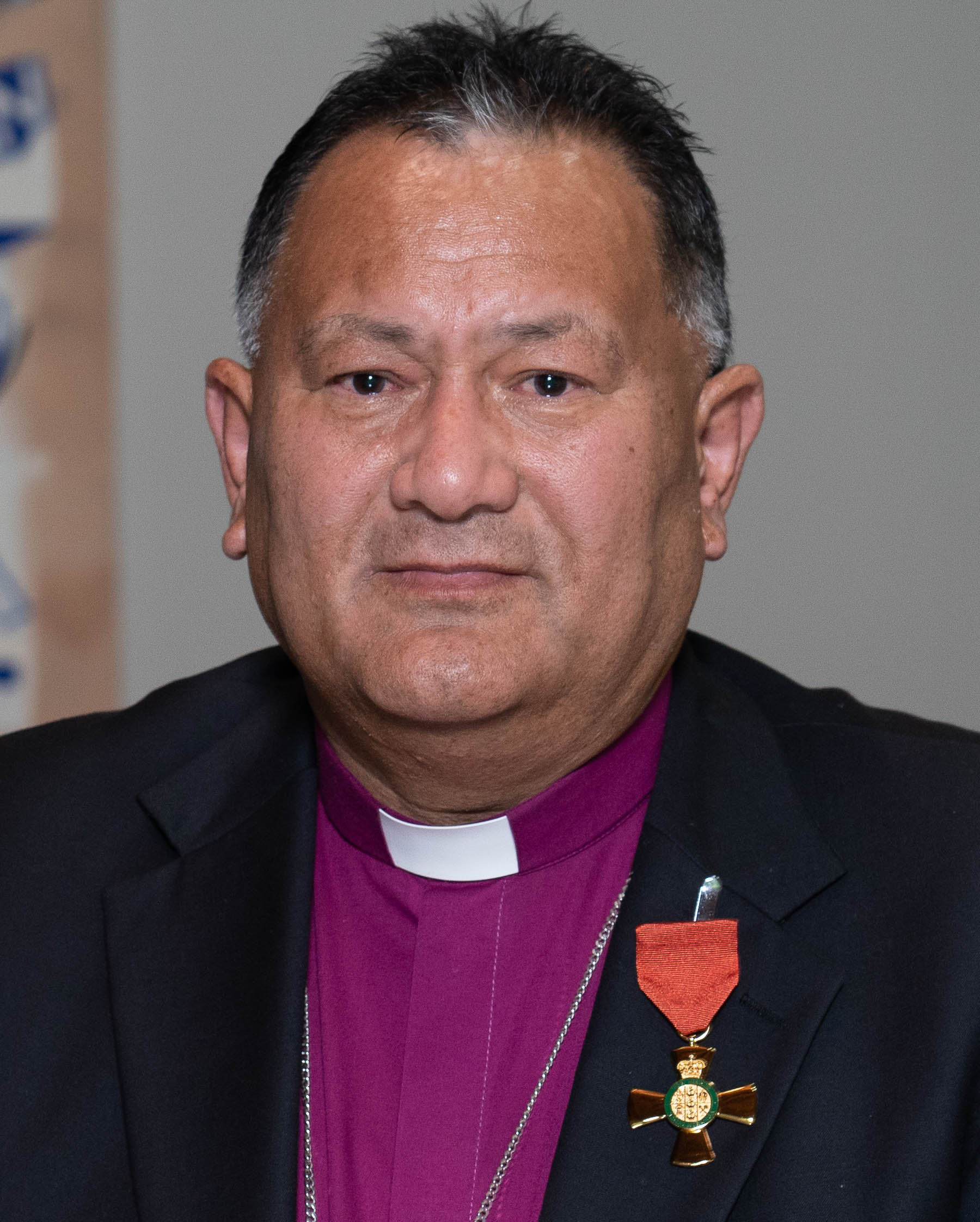
- Pikaahu in 2021
- Church: Anglican Church in Aotearoa, New Zealand and Polynesia

Orders
- Ordination: 1987 (deacon); 1988 (priest)
- Consecration: 24 February 2002

Personal details
- Born: Te Kitohi Wiremu Pikaahu; 1965 (age 60–61)
- Denomination: Anglican
- Residence: Kawakawa, New Zealand
- Spouse: Lynnore Pikaahu
- Education: St John's College, Auckland (LTh), University of Oxford (MTh)

Te Kitohi "Kito" Wiremu Pikaahu ONZM (born 1965) is a Māori Anglican bishop. He has been the incumbent of the episcopal polity of Te Pīhopatanga o Te Tai Tokerau since 2002.

Originally from Taipā, Pikaahu affiliates to the Ngāpuhi, Ngāti Kahu, Te Aupōuri, Te Rarawa, Te Roroa and Ngāti Whātua iwi. He moved with his family to Auckland and became part of the Māori Anglican Church, and was confirmed at age 15.

When he was consecrated bishop in 2002 at age 37, the Archbishop of Canterbury acknowledged Pikaahu as the youngest bishop in the worldwide Anglican Communion.

In 2020, Pikaahu had led Waitangi Day services for 20 years, and had advocated for the wellbeing of Māori and indigenous communities. He had led the promotion of the United Nations Declaration on the Rights of Indigenous Peoples, providing a framework for Anglican leadership. Pikaahu was one of the world's highest-ranking and longest-serving indigenous Anglican bishops and has chaired the global Anglican Indigenous Network since 2015.

Pikaahu was chair of the Anglican Church in Aotearoa, New Zealand and Polynesia's Common Life Liturgical Commission from 2010 to 2016. He has been a member of the International Anglican Liturgical Consultation since 2007 and is chair of Te Runanga Whakawhanaunga I Nga Hahi O Aotearoa. He has been chaplain and sometimes kaumātua of the Māori Women’s Welfare League since 2007. He is foundation chair of Te Whare Ruruhau o Meri, a kaupapa Māori-based provider of crisis support services for victims of abuse, guided by the Te Tai Tokerau branch of the Anglican Church. He has been a member of the Police Commissioner’s Māori Focus Forum since 2014. He is the Anglican Liaison Bishop for the New Zealand Defence Force Chaplains. Pikaahu is a Te Kotahitanga representative on the governing board of St John's Theological College.

In the 2021 New Year Honours, Pikaahu was appointed an Officer of the New Zealand Order of Merit, for services to the Anglican Church and Māori.
