= Frederick Bennett (bishop) =

New Zealand bishop

The Right Reverend Frederick Bennett CMG
- Bishop of Aotearoa
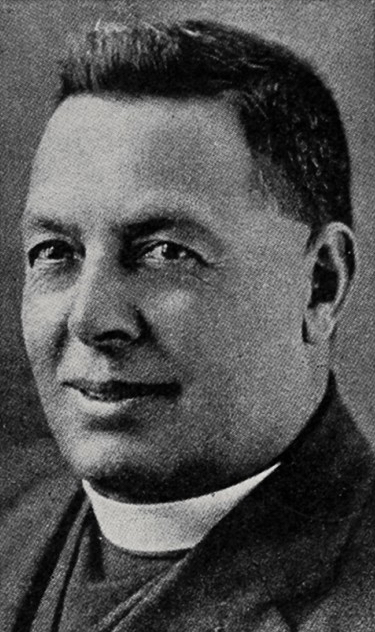
- Diocese: Diocese of Waiapu
- Elected: 1928
- Successor: Wiremu Panapa

Orders
- Ordination: 1896
- Consecration: 2 December 1928

Personal details
- Born: Frederick Augustus Bennett; 15 November 1871 Ohinemutu, Lake Rotorua
- Died: 16 September 1950 (aged 78) Kohupatiki, Hawke's Bay
- Denomination: Anglican
- Spouse: Hana Te Unuhi Mere Paaka (1899–1909); Arihia Rangioue Pokiha (1911–1950)
- Relatives: Manuhuia Bennett (son); Sir Charles Bennett (son); Michael Bennett (grandson); Manu Bennett (great-grandson); Hamish Bennett (great-grandson); Tania Tapsell (great-granddaughter)

Frederick Augustus Bennett CMG (15 November 1871 – 16 September 1950) was a New Zealand Anglican Suffragan Bishop who served as the first Bishop of Aotearoa from 1928 to 1950.

== Early life ==
Frederick Augustus Bennett was born on 15 November 1871 at Ohinemutu, Lake Rotorua. His mother was Raiha Ratete (Eliza Rogers), a high-born woman of Ngati Whakaue in Te Arawa, and his father was Thomas Jackson Bennett, a storekeeper who had emigrated to New Zealand from Ireland in 1849.

His early years were spent in Maketu, where he was baptised by S. M. Spencer. In 1883 he gained a scholarship to St Stephen's Native Boys' School in Auckland, and in 1884 he continued his studies at Te Wairoa Native School at Lake Tarawera. Around this time, Bennett met with Bishop A. B. Suter of Nelson. With the consent of his parents, the Bishop took Bennet to Nelson to continue his education at Bishop's School, where he was a prefect.

== Ordained ministry ==
In 1893 Bennett accepted a post at Putiki, Wanganui, as lay reader at the Māori mission, but by the end of 1895 he had returned to Nelson to engage in further study. He was ordained deacon in 1896, completed his licentiate in theology and was ordained priest in 1897. As assistant curate at All Saints' Church he organised the choral singing, and was influential in building a church at Motueka, and a school at Whangarae Bay.

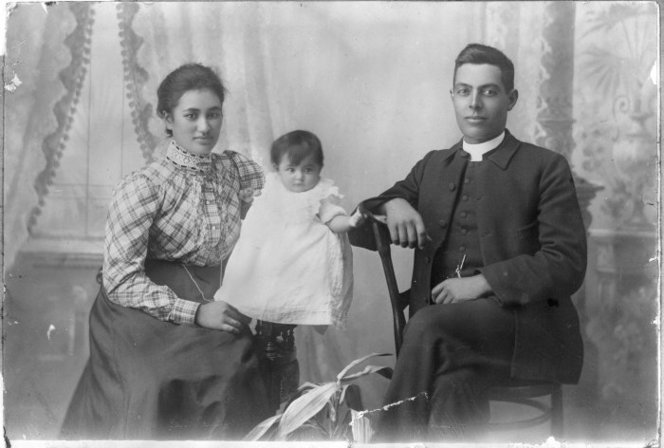
Bennett with his first wife Hana Te Unuhi Mere Paaka and their child Rawinia Bennett, c.1900.

In 1905, Bennett moved to Rotorua superintendent of the Maori mission. His area extended from Rotorua to Taupō and south to Tokaanu. After serving in Rotorua for 13 years, Bennett moved on to Hawke's Bay to carry out further mission work. In 1917 he was installed as pastor at Waipatu, and his mission area extended from Nūhaka to Waipawa. He was elected a member of the standing committee for the diocese of Waiapu, and served on the Te Aute Trust Board.

In 1925 it was suggested at General Synod that a Maori diocese be established with its own bishop, partly in response to the formation of the Ratana church. On 2 December 1928 he was consecrated bishop of Aotearoa, the first Maori bishop in New Zealand's history.

In 1935, Bennett was awarded the King George V Silver Jubilee Medal. In 1948 he attended the Lambeth Conference in London, and during this visit preached at Westminster Abbey. In the 1948 New Year Honours he was appointed a Companion of the Order of St Michael and St George.

Bennett died at his home at Kohupatiki, Hawke's Bay, on 16 September 1950, survived by his second wife and 18 children. He was buried beneath the sanctuary of St Faith's Church, Ohinemutu.

== Personal life ==
Bennett was married to Hana Te Unuhi Mere Paaka (Hannah Mary Park) from 1899 until her death in 1909. Frederick remarried in 1911 to Arihia Rangioue Pokiha. Between the two marriages, Bennett had 19 children. His son Manuhuia became the third bishop of Aotearoa.

== See also ==
- Maata Horomona
- Gaston Méliès

== Notes ==
Religious titles
New title	Bishop of Aotearoa; 1928–1950	Succeeded by Wiremu Netana Panapa
