= Muru Walters =

New Zealand bishop, author, artist and rugby union player (1935–2024)

The Right Reverend Muru Walters
- Te Pīhopa o Te Upoko o Te Ika
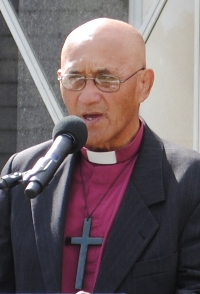
- Walters in 2012
- Province: Anglican Church in Aotearoa, New Zealand and Polynesia
- Diocese: Te Pīhopatanga o Te Upoko o Te Ika
- Installed: 7 March 1992
- Term ended: 2018
- Predecessor: New diocese
- Successor: Wai Quayle

Personal details
- Born: 16 January 1935 Kaitaia, New Zealand
- Died: 14 February 2024 (aged 89) Mangawhai, New Zealand
- Denomination: Anglicanism
- Education: Auckland Teachers' College; University of Otago

Rugby union career
- Position: Fullback
Provincial / State sides
Years	Team	Apps	(Points)
1955–1963	North Auckland		
1965	Poverty Bay	6	(31)
International career
Years	Team	Apps	(Points)
1956–1963	New Zealand Māori		(211)

Muru Walters (16 January 1935 – 14 February 2024) was a New Zealand author, master carver, broadcaster, artist, rugby union player and Māori Anglican bishop. He was the first Pīhopa (bishop) of Te Pīhopatanga o Te Upoko o Te Ika from his consecration on 7 March 1992 until his retirement in 2018.

== Biography ==
Muru Walters was born in Kaitaia. He affiliated to the Te Rarawa and Te Aupōuri iwi. A talented rugby player, Walters represented New Zealand Māori, and won the Tom French Cup for the Māori rugby union player of the year in 1957. He studied at Auckland Teachers' College. After working in arts and crafts education in schools, he became a lecturer in art at Dunedin Teachers' College. In 1980, Walters completed a master's degree on Māori archaeology at the University of Otago. He was later a lecturer in Māori Studies at St John's Theological College in Auckland. In October 2020, Walters was made a Life Fellow of Selwyn College Dunedin.

Walters died at his home in Mangawhai on 14 February 2024, at the age of 89.

Awards
Preceded by Bill Gray	Tom French Memorial; Māori rugby union player of the year 1957	Succeeded by Pat Walsh
