= Te Pīhopatanga o Te Tai Tokerau =

Diocese of the Anglican Church in Aotearoa, New Zealand and Polynesia

Coordinates: 35.3°S 174.1°E

Diocese of Te Tai Tokerau Māori: Te Pīhopatanga o Te Tai Tokerau
- Arms of the Te Tai Tokerau
- Incumbent: Te Kitohi Pikaahu ONZM
- Style: The Right Reverend

Location
- Country: New Zealand
- Territory: North Island
- Ecclesiastical province: Aotearoa, New Zealand and Polynesia
- Headquarters: Paihia, Bay of Islands

Information
- First holder: Ben Te Haara
- Formation: 7 March 1992
- Denomination: Anglican
- Archdiocese: Aotearoa
- Language: Māori, English

Current leadership
- Major Archbishop: Don Tamihere
- Pīhopa: Te Kitohi Pikaahu ONZM

Website
- https://tetaitokerau.anglican.org/

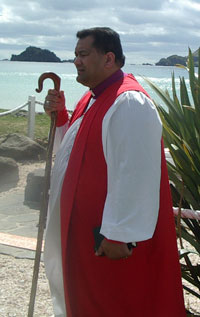
Kito Pikaahu, Pīhopa o Te Tai Tokerau

Te Pīhopatanga o Te Tai Tokerau is an episcopal polity or diocese of the Anglican Church in Aotearoa, New Zealand and Polynesia. Literally, the diocese is the Anglican bishopric of the north coast of the North Island of Aotearoa, New Zealand; also known as the synod (or in Māori: Te Hui Amorangi).

Te Pīhopatanga extends from the Bombay Hills south of Auckland through to Te Rerenga Wairua (the North Cape). According to the 2001 census, there are approximately 25,000 Māori Anglicans within this area. Te Tai Tokerau is one of five pīhopatanga, or episcopal units, that comprise Te Pīhopatanga o Aotearoa, the Māori Anglican Church in Aotearoa, New Zealand.

== Ministry ==
There are ten pastorates (ministry units) within Te Pīhopatanga o Te Tai Tokerau:

- Archdeaconry of Te Tai Tokerau: Parengarenga-Ahipara-Peria, Whangaroa, South Hokianga, Waimate Taumarere, Whangarei, Northern Wairoa, and Nga Tapuwae o Te Ariki
- Archdeaconry of Tamaki Makaurau: Te Mihana Maori o Tamaki Makaurau, Te Takiwā o Manukau, and Cook Island congregation (CIMAH)

Ministry also takes place in:

- numerous prison, school and hospital chaplaincies
- Te Whare Ruruhau o Meri, the social service agency based in Auckland
- relational ministries including Kahui Wāhine (Women's ministry), Kahui Tane (Men's ministry), and Kahui Rangatahi (Youth ministry)

== Structure ==
Te Pīhopatanga is governed by te Hui Amorangi, a representative synod that meets annually. The Komiti Tumuaki executive meets four times a year, and has two subcommittees: Ministry and Education. This executive is responsible for ordination and training matters; and a finance sub-committee.

Te Pīhopatanga comes under the episcopal leadership of te Pīhopa o (the Bishop of) Te Tai Tokerau. Kito Pikaahu was ordained bishop on 24 February 2002 at the age of 37. Ben Te Haara was the first Pīhopa, from his 7 March 1992 consecration until 2001.

Since 2010, George Connor and John Paterson (archbishop emeritus) have served as Pīhopa Āwhina (honorary assistant bishops).
