= Te Pīhopatanga o Te Manawa o Te Wheke =

Anglican diocese in Aotearoa, New Zealand and Polynesia

Coordinates: 37.41°S 175.198°E

Diocese of Te Manawa o Te Wheke Māori: Te Pīhopatanga o Te Manawa o Te Wheke
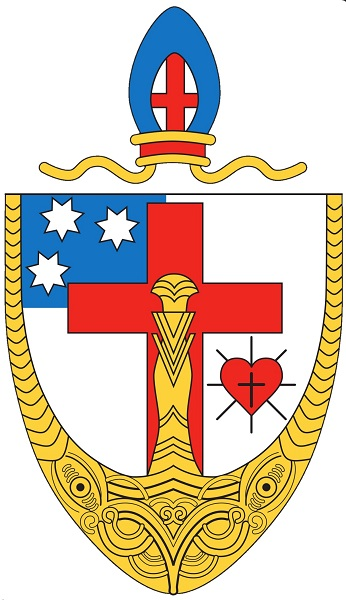
- Arms of the Te Manawa o Te Wheke
- Incumbent; Ngarahu Katene
- Style: The Right Reverend

Location
- Country: New Zealand
- Territory: North Island
- Ecclesiastical province: Aotearoa, New Zealand and Polynesia
- Headquarters: Rotorua

Information
- First holder: Ngarahu Katene
- Formation: 14 October 2006
- Denomination: Anglican
- Cathedral: Te Papa-i-o-uru Marae
- Language: Māori, English

Current leadership
- Parent church: Anglican Communion
- Major Archbishop: Primate of New Zealand; Pīhopa Mātāmua
- Pīhopa: Ngarahu Katene

Te Pīhopatanga o Te Manawa o Te Wheke is an episcopal polity or diocese of the Anglican Church in Aotearoa, New Zealand and Polynesia. Literally, the diocese is the Anglican bishopric of the heart of the octopus of the North Island of Aotearoa, New Zealand; also known as the synod (or in Māori: Te Hui Amorangi).

Te Manawa o Te Wheke extends from the Bombay Hills south of Auckland through to Taumarunui in the King Country. Te Manawa o Te Wheke is one of five pīhopatanga, or episcopal units, that comprise Te Pīhopatanga o Aotearoa, the Māori Anglican Church in Aotearoa, New Zealand.

In 2015 the Pīhopatanga (bishopric) underwent a major restructure which resulted in the disestablishment of Archdeaconries and the merging of some Pariha (parish). It also led to the creation of the role of Te Manutaki, a senior cleric who, on behalf of the bishop, oversees and implements the mission and ministry of the Amorangi.

== Ministry ==
There are 14 Rohe (regions) within Te Manawa o Te Wheke. The Rohe are grouped into 7 Rohe Mihana (Mission Districts), each led by a Missioner:

- Te Rohe Mihana o Waikato: Taupiri, Ngati Haua, Kirikiriroa, Puaha o Waikato / Tuakau, and Taumarunui.
- Te Rohe Mihana o Waiariki: Te Ngae, Ohinemutu, and Tauponui-a-Tia
- Te Rohe Mihana o Mataatua: Whakatāne, Kawerau, Ruatoki, and Murupara
- Te Rohe Mihana o Tauranga Moana: Tauranga, Maketu, Pukehina, and Te Puke
- Te Rohe Mihana o Hauraki: Parawai, Paeroa, and Kennedy's Bay
- Te Rohe Mihana o Te Kaha: Ōpōtiki, Tōrere, Te Kaha, Raukokore, and Kauaetangohia

Ministry also takes place in:

- prison, school and hospital chaplaincies
- relational ministries including Kahui Wāhine (women's ministry), Kahui Tane (men's ministry), and Kahui Rangatahi (youth ministry)

== Structure ==
The Hui Amorangi is governed by a hinota, a representative synod that meets annually. The Amorangi Whaiti executive meets several times a year, to discuss matters pertaining to the Hui Amorangi.

The Hui Amorangi comes under episcopal leadership of te Pīhopa o (the Bishop of) Te Manawa o Te Wheke, Ngarahu Katene. Katene was ordained (consecrated) as a bishop at Te Papa-i-o-uru Marae, Rotorua on 14 October 2006. Katene is the first elected Pīhopa o Te Manawa o Te Wheke. In 2019 Archbishop Don Tamihere (Te Pihopa o Aotearoa) appointed Bishop Ngarahu as the Vicar General of Te Pihopatanga o Aotearoa. In this role, when delegated, Katene acts as the Senior Bishop for the Maori Anglican Church.

Since 2017, David Moxon (archbishop emeritus) has served as He Pīhopa Āwhina (an honorary assistant bishop).

Archdeacon Ngira Simmonds is Te Manutaki | Director of Mission and Education. In this role he led all administrative, educational, missional and managerial matters for Te Manawa o Te Wheke. Archdeacon Simmonds is also the Chaplain to Kingi Tuheitia Potatau Te Wherowhero VII, the Maori King. Jasmin Haimona is the Office Administrator, assisting the bishop and all staff with administrative matters.

Each Mission District is led by a Missioner/ Matanga Mihingare. The role of a Missioner is twofold: 1 – To extend the educational work of the Amorangi to the Rohe by providing local educational initiatives 2 – To act as an extension of the Bishop's pastoral ministry in that Rohe. Missioner's oversee all ministry and mission in their Rohe and report back to the Bishop frequently.

- The Missioner of Waiariki is the Venerable Joe Huta
- The Missioner of Mataatua is the Venerable Dr Te Waaka Melbourne
- The Missioner of Tauranga Moana is the Reverend Wiremu Anania
- The Missioner of Hauraki is vacant
- The Missioner of Waikato is the Reverend Father Cruz Karauti-Fox
- The Missioner of Te Kaha is the Reverend Bettina Maxwell.

Rangatahi (children and youth) ministry is a strong priority for Te Manawa o Te Wheke. This ministry is led by two Enablers:

- Kaiwhakamana Rangarahi: Tauranga Moana, Mataatua, Te Kaha is Sophie Anania
- Kaiwhakamana Rangarahi: Waikato, Hauraki, Waiariki is Mira Martin

== Gallery ==
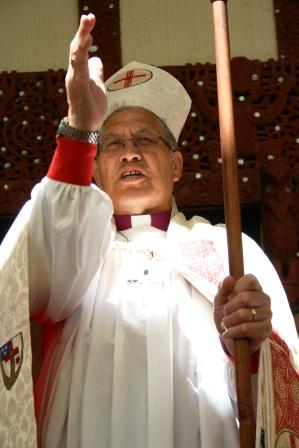
Ngarahu Katene, Pīhopa o Te Manawa o Te Wheke, giving a blessing.

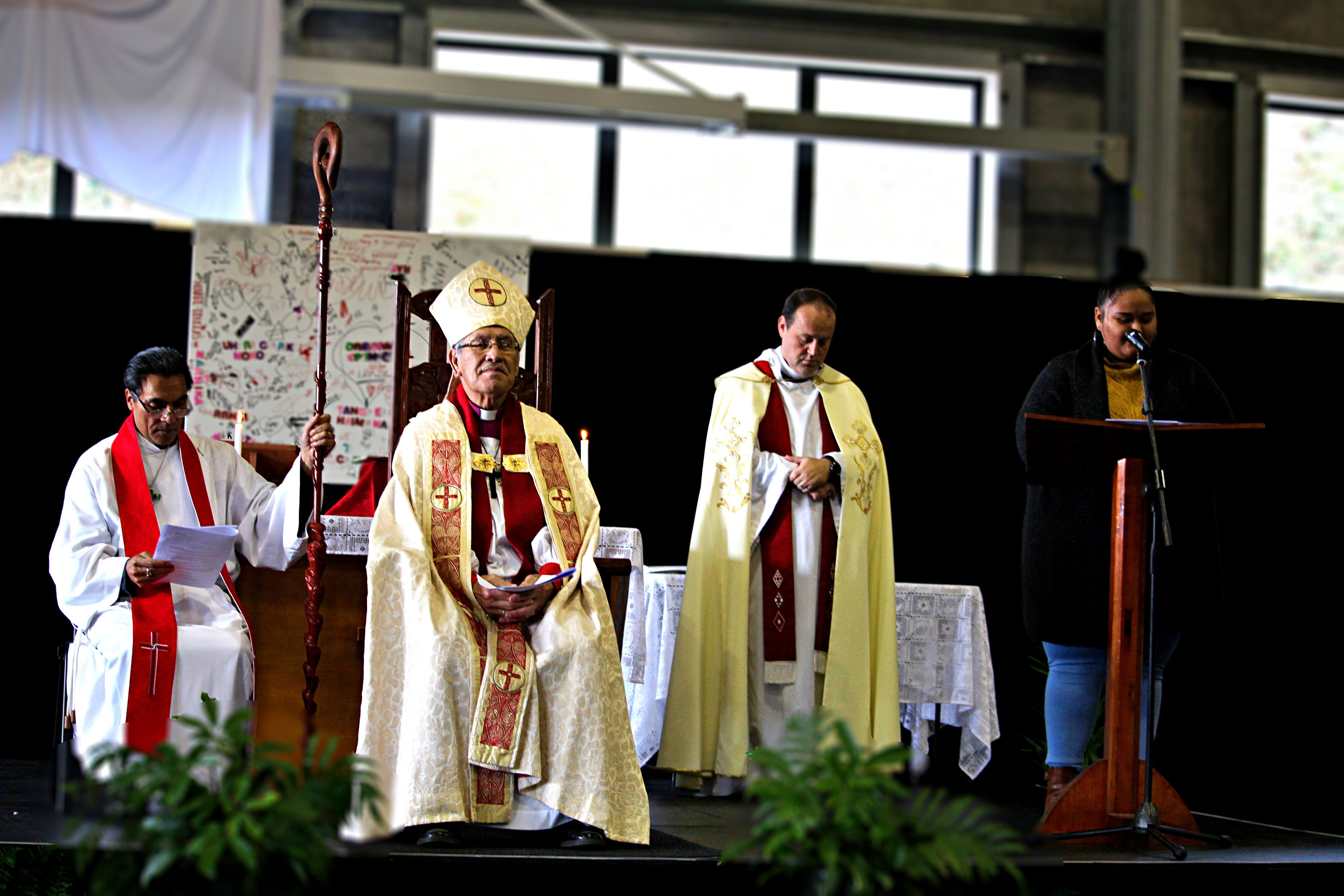
Bishop Ngarahu Katene (seated) listens as Hineoripo Waenga reads from the Bible at an annual Confirmation Service in 2019.

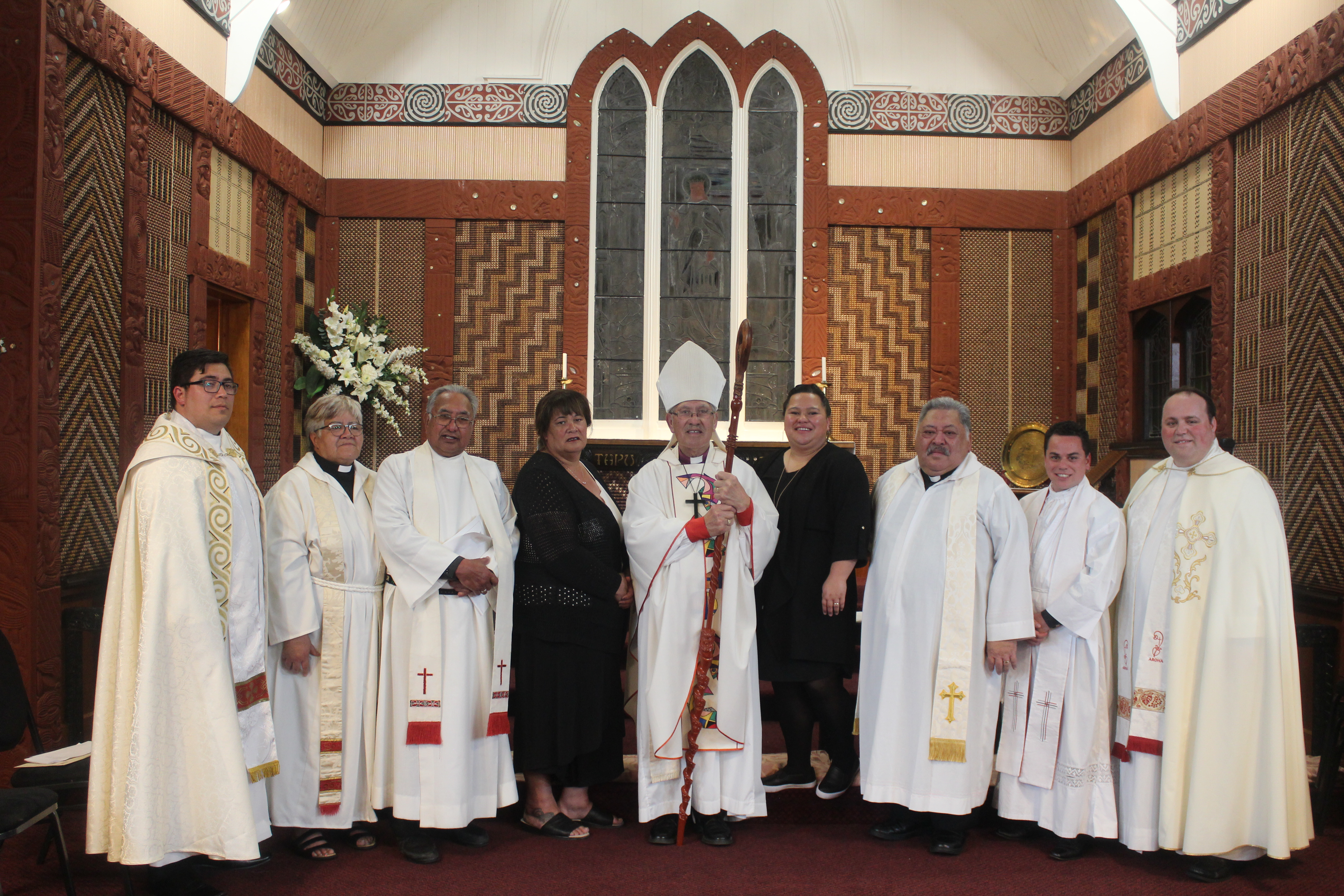
Bishop Ngarahu Katene picture with his newly Commissioned Staff Team in October 2018 - St Faith's Church, Rotorua.
