= St Mary's Church, Tikitiki =

Church in Tikitiki, New Zealand

St Mary's Church
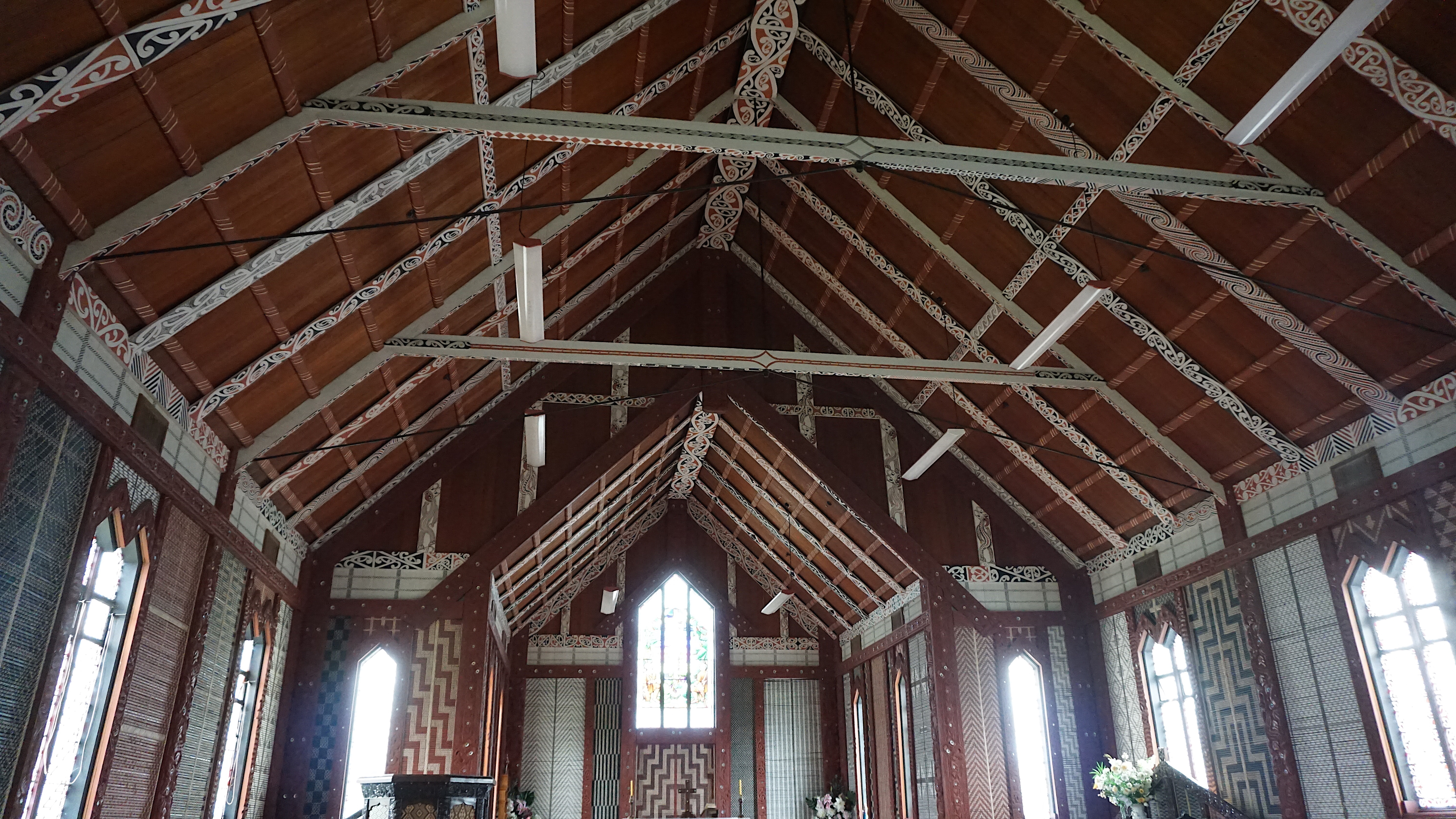
- Interior of St Mary's Church
- St Mary's Church
- 37°47′46″S 178°24′34″E
- Location: Tikitiki
- Address: 1889 Te Araroa Road (State Highway 35), Tikitiki
- Country: New Zealand
- Denomination: Anglican

History
- Consecrated: 16 February 1926

Architecture
- Architect: Sir Apirana Turupa Ngata
- Style: Gothic Revival (exterior)
- Years built: 1924–1926

Administration
- Diocese: Anglican Diocese of Waiapu

Heritage New Zealand – Category 1
- Designated: 6 June 1990
- Reference no.: 3306

St Mary's Church is a historic 20th-century Anglican church in Tikitiki, New Zealand. The church was established as a war memorial to local soldiers of Māori descent and also commemorates the establishment of Christianity in Waiapu and the East Coast. It is registered as a category 1 building with Heritage New Zealand.

== Description ==
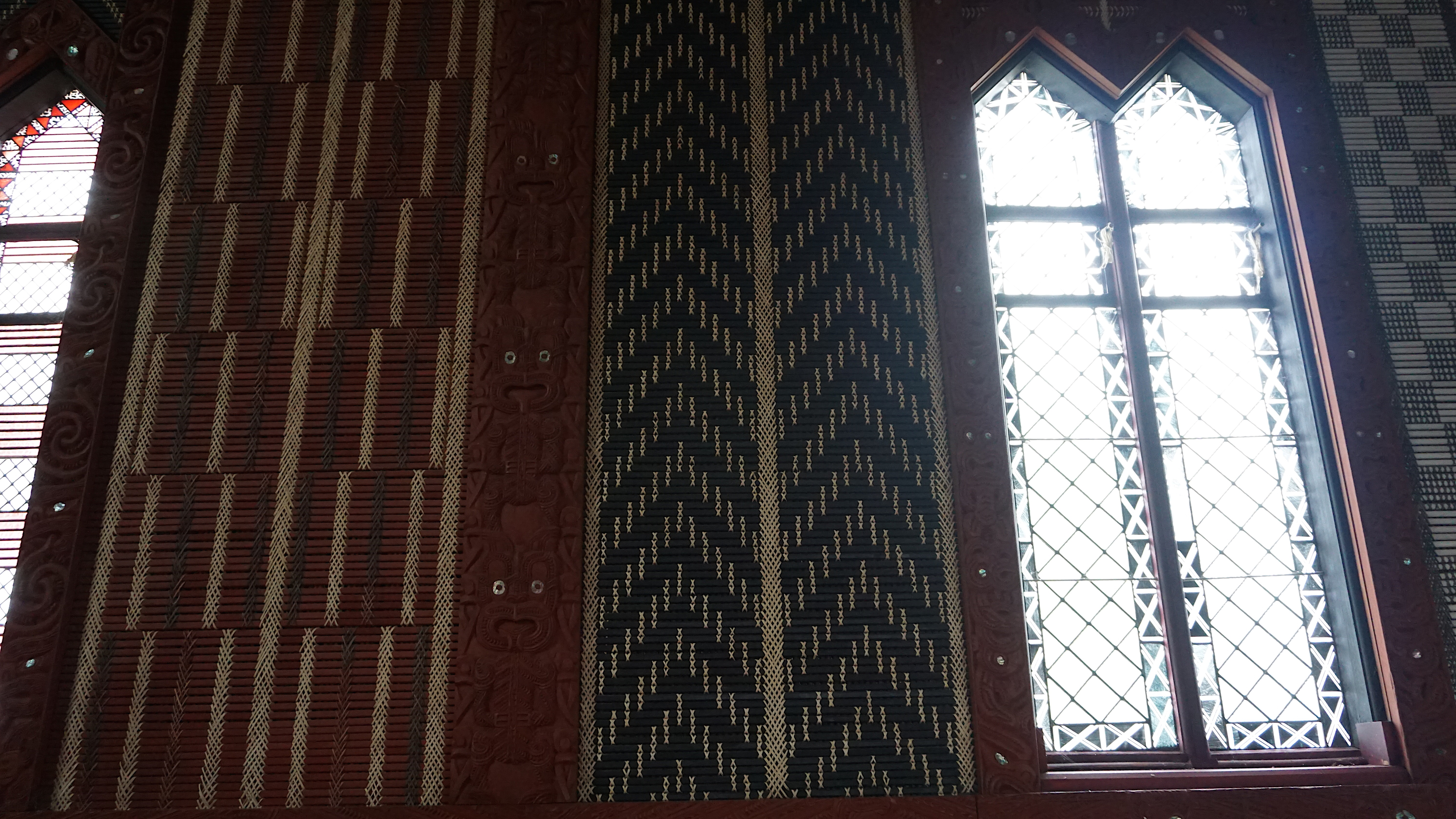
Interior design of St Mary's Church

St Mary's Church is situated atop a hill overlooking State Highway 35. The elevated position makes the church a landmark.

St Mary's Church has a simplistic Gothic Revival exterior. The interior is more intricate with ornate handcrafted Māori artwork made with traditional materials. The rafters are painted in a kowhaiwhai design along with a cornice. Stained-glass windows also incorporate traditional Māori designs. The walls have woven tukutuku panels with eight different designs, between these panels are carved wood. Other carved wooden features include the communion rail, altar and pulpit, which were gifts from people of Te Arawa.

The stained glass window in the chancel depicts two Māori soldiers kneeling before Christ on a cross. The two soldiers are Second Lieutenant Hēnare Kōhere and Captain Pekama Kaa; both men were killed in the First World War and were of Ngāti Porou ancestry.

The building has a concrete foundation, timber weatherboards and corrugated iron roof. The triangular headed windows are supposed to mimic lancet windows. The church contains a vestry, chancel and porch located south, east and west of the nave respectively. The chancel's roof is lower in height but maintains the same angle as the gable of the rest of the church. The east and west ends of the church have one large central window divided into three by mullions.

== History ==
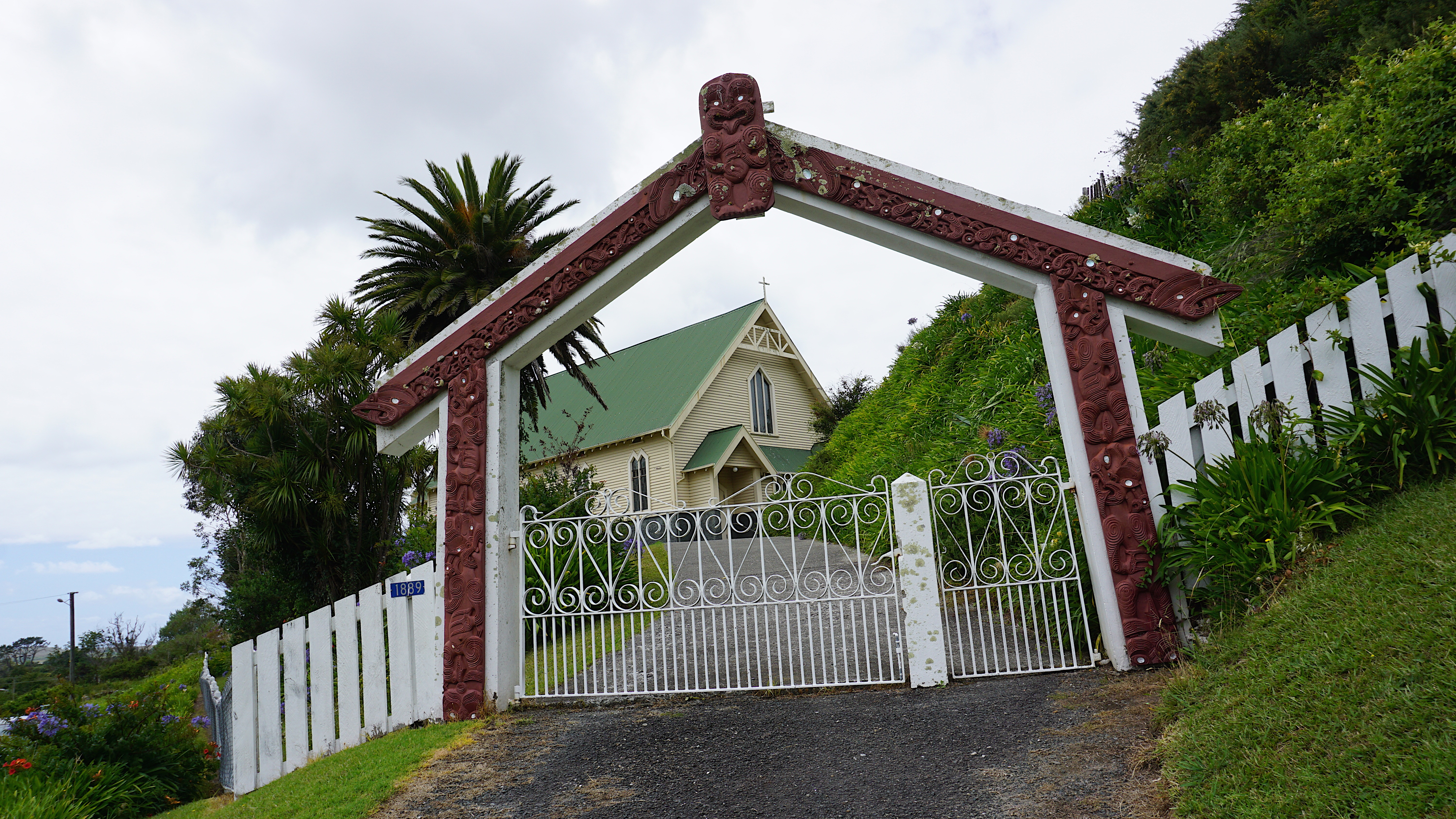
The entrance gate to St Mary's Church

The site of the church is the location of an 1866 battle between two different religious factions of Ngāti Porou, Christian and Pai Marire.

Sir Apirana Turupa Ngata, a proponent of traditional Māori arts and craft, was the main supporter for the construction of St Mary's Church as a war memorial to fallen soldiers.

The foundation stone was laid in 1924 and construction was finished in 1926. The church was consecrated on 16 February 1926. Around 5,000 attended the opening including the Prime Minister Gordon Coates and Governor-General Sir Charles Fergusson. The Bishop of Waiapu, William Walmsley Sedgwick, conducted the ceremony. During the ceremony Fergusson unveiled a marble statue of a soldier above the church.

Sir Apirana Turupa Ngata oversaw the design of the church and supervised the weaving of tukutuku panels and painting of kōwhaiwhai designs. He ensured no modern designs were used. Much of the carving was done by Hone Ngatoto, a local carver.

A memorial obelisk to Ngata was constructed near the church following his death. It was unveiled by Prime Minister Sidney Holland on 13 July 1952. The inscription states:

their deep affection for him; the vine which bound together the churches and tribes of the Maori people; the pillar of Maori traditions and the guiding star of his people.

Restoration and conservation works were carried out in 1989 and 2001–2002.

== Significance ==
Heritage New Zealand states that the church holds "great spiritual and historical significance" for Ngati Porou. The church also commemorates Taumata-a-Kura, who brought Christianity to Waiapu. Taumata-a-Kura was taken as a slave by Ngāpuhi raiders to the Bay of Islands. He managed to escape and sought refuge with missionaries. After returning home to Waiapu he spread Christianity to Ngati Porou. The church was built as a war memorial to local Māori soldiers who died during the First World War.

Although the church is not a cathedral it is sometimes referred to as the cathedral of Ngāti Porou. The church is well regarded due to its beauty.
