= Te Pīhopatanga o Te Tairāwhiti =

Anglican diocese in Aotearoa, New Zealand and Polynesia

Diocese of Te Tairāwhiti Māori: Te Pīhopatanga o Te Tairāwhiti
- Arms of Te Tairāwhiti
- Incumbent; Donald Tamihere
- Style: The Right Reverend

Location
- Country: New Zealand
- Territory: East Coast, North Island
- Ecclesiastical province: Aotearoa, New Zealand and Polynesia
- Headquarters: Gisborne
- Coordinates: 38.7°S 178°E

Statistics
- Population: Total: (as of 2013); 17,000
- Parishes: 30 (as of 2016)

Information
- First holder: Brown Turei
- Denomination: Anglican
- Established: 1992
- Language: Māori, English

Current leadership
- Parent church: Anglican Communion
- Major Archbishop: Primate of New Zealand; Pīhopa Mātāmua
- Pīhopa: Donald Tamihere

Website
- tairawhiti.org.nz

Te Pihopatanga o Te Tairāwhiti is an episcopal polity or diocese of the Anglican Church in Aotearoa, New Zealand and Polynesia. Literally, the diocese is the Anglican bishopric of the East Coast, in Tairāwhiti, of the North Island of Aotearoa, New Zealand; also known as the synod (or in Māori: Te Hui Amorangi).

The Pīhopatanga serves communities from Potaka in the north, to Woodville in the south. In general this covers the Ngāti Porou, Ngāti Kahungunu and the Turanga-nui-a-kiwa iwi. According to the 2013 census, there are approximately 17,000 Māori Anglicans within this area. Te Tairāwhiti is one of five pīhopatanga, or episcopal units, that comprise Te Pīhopatanga o Aotearoa, the Māori Anglican Church in Aotearoa, New Zealand.

The current Pīhopa o (Bishop of) Te Tairāwhiti is Donald Tamihere.

== Ministry ==
The 2025 synod held at Omahu Marae, Hawkes Bay from October 31 - November 2 approved a new structure as part of a proposal presented by the bishop named Ka Tipu Ka Hua. The new structure consolidated the five former rohe (ministry units) into two Rohe Atirikona (archdeaconries).

The former rohe of Ngati Porou and Turanga-Whangara were combined to create Te Rohe Atirikona o Horouta (Horouta Archdeaconry). While the former rohe of Kahungunu ki te Wairoa, Matau a Maui, and Waipawa were combined to create Te Rohe Atirikona o Takitimu (Takitimu Archdeaconry).

On Sunday November 2 The Venerable Merekaraka Te Whiti was collated as the first Archdeacon for Horouta and the Venerable Ruihana Paenga was collated as the first Archdeacon for Takitimu.

=== Parishes ===
Te Tairāwhiti has around 30 parishes (pariha) spread across four rohe.

Parish	Area
Te Rohe Atirikona o Horouta
Te Rau College	Gisborne
St David's Church, Kaiti	Gisborne
Nikora Tapu	Wainui Beach, Gisborne
Toko Toru Tapu (Kaiti)	Gisborne
Toko Toru Tapu (Manutuke)	Manutuke
Mihaia Anglican Church	Tolaga Bay
Patoromu Church	Whangara
St Peter's Church, Waiherere	Hexton, Gisborne
Te Hunga Tapu Katoa	Muriwai
St Mary's Church	Tokomaru Bay
St Abraham's Church	Waipiro Bay
St Barnabas Church	Hicks Bay
St Stephen's Church	Te Araroa
Pokai Whare, Tikapa	Ruatoria
St Paul's Church	Ruatoria
St Michael's & All Angels Church	Ruatoria
Kariaka Marae	Ruatoria
St Andrew's Church	Ruatoria
St Mary's Church	Tikitiki
St John's Church	Tikitiki
Te Rohe Atirikona o Takitimu
Tawhiti A Maru Marae	Wairoa
St Paul's Anglican Church	Wairoa
Nūhaka Māori Anglican Church	Nūhaka
Putahi Marae	Frasertown
St John's Church	Omahu
St Luke's Church	Paki Paki
St Matthew's Church	Waipatu
Kohupatiki Marae	Clive
Te Pou Herenga Waka o Te Whakapono	Napier, New Zealand

The Pīhopatanga is also home to two Māori Anglican boarding schools, Te Aute College and Hukarere Girls' College.

== Leadership ==
Archbishop Brown Turei was elected as the first Pīhopa o Te Tairāwhiti (Bishop of Te Tairāwhiti) in 1992. Turei was also Te Pīhopa o Aotearoa (Head of the Māori Anglican Church) and Archbishop of the Anglican Church in Aotearoa-New Zealand and Polynesia. Turei died on 9 January 2017, two months before his scheduled retirement. He was aged 92 years and the oldest primate in the Anglican Communion.

In March 2016 Donald Tamihere was elected to succeed Turei at an electoral synod held at the Toko Toru Tapu Church, Manutuke, following the announcement of Turei's retirement earlier in the year. Tamihere was ordained and installed as the second bishop of (Pīhopa o) Te Tairāwhiti at a service held at Waiomatatini Marae, Ruatoria on 11 March 2017. Tamihere also became Te Pīhopa o Aotearoa on 7 March 2018, following his nomination at Te Runanganui, September 2017 and the consent of Te Hīnota Whānui / General Synod; and automatically Pīhopa Matāmua / Primate and Archbishop.

Maui Tangohau serves as Vicar General of Tairāwhiti.

=== Canon Emeritus ===
- The Reverend Canon Huatahi Niania
- The Reverend Canon Keeni Priestley
- The Reverend Canon Brent Swann
- The Reverend Canon Tiopira Tuhiwai
- The Reverend Canon Jacqueline Moana Te Amo
- The Reverend Canon Morehu Te Maro
