= Don Tamihere =

New Zealand Anglican bishop (born 1972)

His Grace The Most Reverend Donald Steven Tamihere
- Te Pīhopa o Te Tairāwhiti; (Bishop of Te Tairāwhiti); Te Pīhopa o Aotearoa; (Bishop of Aotearoa); Archbishop & Primate of Anglican Church in Aotearoa, New Zealand and Polynesia
- Province: Anglican Church in Aotearoa, New Zealand and Polynesia
- Diocese: Te Pīhopatanga o Te Tairāwhiti Te Pīhopatanga o Aotearoa
- Installed: 11 March 2017
- Predecessor: Brown Turei

Orders
- Ordination: 11 March 2017
- Consecration: 11 March 2017 by Philip Richardson and Winston Halapua

Personal details
- Born: Donald Steven Tamihere; 1972 (age 53–54) Gisborne, New Zealand
- Denomination: Anglicanism
- Residence: Gisborne
- Spouse: Temukisa Saifiti (m. 1994)
- Children: 3
- Profession: Clerk in Holy Orders
- Education: Saint John's Theological College

Donald Steven Tamihere (born 1972) is Te Pīhopa o Te Tairāwhiti (Bishop of Te Tairāwhiti). He was ordained as a bishop in March 2017, succeeding Archbishop Brown Turei. Since April 2018, Tamihere has also served as the Te Pīhopa o Aotearoa, the Bishop of the Maori Anglican Church and Primate and Archbishop of New Zealand.

Before his election as bishop, Tamihere was Tumuaki (Dean) of Te Rau College and Ministry Educator for Te Pīhopatanga o Te Tairāwhiti.

== Early life ==
Tamihere was born in Gisborne in 1972 to Don and Catherine Tamihere. His early childhood was spent in Te Puia Springs and Ruatoria, and his teenage years in Tokomaru Bay. At age 12 Tamihere was confirmed by Bishop Peter Atkins at Mangahanea Marae in Ruatoria. He began teaching Bible in schools at the age of 15. At 19, Tamihere left Tokomaru Bay to study at the Apostolic Church's Te Nikau Bible College in Paraparaumu. In 2001 he graduated from Saint John's Theological College with a master's degree in theology.

== Ordained ministry ==
Tamihere was deaconed at St Mary's Church, Tikitiki, on 23 March 2003, and priested at Holy Trinity Gisborne on 5 December 2004.

In October 2016, following Brown Turei's resignation as Bishop of Te Tairāwhiti, Tamihere was nominated to succeed Turei at an electoral college held in Toko Toro Tapu church in Manutuke. Tamihere was ordained and installed as second bishop of Tairāwhiti at Porourangi Marae in Ruatoria on 11 March 2017.

== Personal life ==
Tamihere met Temukisa Saifiti while studying at Te Nikau Bible College and they married in 1994. The marriage was officiated by Archdeacon Hone Kaa. Tamihere has three children. Tamihere's two younger brothers are also involved in the Anglican church, the Ven Michael Tamihere succeeded his brother as Dean of Te Rau College, while Andrew is the Diocesan Registrar for Te Pīhopatanga o Te Tairāwhiti.

Religious titles
Preceded by William Brown Turei	Pīhopa o Aotearoa; 2018–	Incumbent
Preceded by William Brown Turei	Pīhopa o Te Tairāwhiti; 2016–	Incumbent
