= Te Pīhopatanga o Aotearoa =

Māori Anglican Church in New Zealand

Tikanga of Te Pīhopatanga o Aotearoa
- Arms of the Te Pīhopatanga o Aotearoa

Location
- Country: New Zealand
- Ecclesiastical province: Aotearoa, New Zealand and Polynesia

Information
- Denomination: Anglican
- Established: 1978/1992
- Parent church: Anglican Communion
- Major Archbishop: Primate of New Zealand; Pīhopa Mātāmua

Te Pīhopatanga o Aotearoa is an Anglican regional bishopric or diocese (Māori: tikanga) that covers the entire country of New Zealand (Māori: Aotearoa). The diocese is home to Māori Anglicans across Aotearoa (New Zealand), and is one of the three tikanga (cultural streams) of the Anglican Church in Aotearoa, New Zealand and Polynesia.

The first Māori bishop was appointed in 1928, and the Pīhopatanga itself was established by the General Synod as an autonomous body in 1978. According to the 2001 census there were about 75,000 Māori Anglicans in Aotearoa, which made it the largest Māori denomination. The Māori tikanga is headed by Don Tamihere, Te Pīhopa o Aotearoa / Bishop of Aotearoa and Te Pīhopa o Te Tairāwhiti / Bishop of Tairāwhiti; Tamihere is the sixth Pīhopa o Aotearoa, succeeding Archbishop Brown Turei.

== Episcopal units ==
The 1992 constitution of the church enabled Te Rūnanga o Te Pīhopatanga (the assembly, i.e. synod; later Te Rūnanganui / general assembly) to create sub-units called hui amorangi (lit. leaders' gathering; similar to the English 'synod') and to provide bishops for these. These hui have developed from mere divisions of Te Pīhopatanga to "episcopal unit" status, comparable to the "New Zealand dioceses", whereby each hui amorangi pīhopa is Licensing Bishop (i.e. Ordinary) in her own right, and have come to each be called Pīhopatanga in themselves.

As of 2025, Te Pīhopatanga o Aotearoa were made up of five pīhopatanga (regional bishoprics0:

- Te Manawa o Te Wheke (lit. the heart of the octopus, i.e. North Island central region)
- Te Tairāwhiti (lit. east coast)
- Te Tai Tokerau (lit. north coast)
- Te Upoko o Te Ika (lit. the head of the fish, i.e. the southern part of the North Island; Wellington/Taranaki)
- Waipounamu (South Island)
