= Camp (surname) =

Camp is an English surname taken from Latin roots. The name is found in Great Britain and in other places throughout the world settled by the English. According to the 2000 census there are fewer than 1300 Camps in the UK. The 2000 US census puts the number at over 27,000, making it the 1087th most common name in America, after McDermott. The Australian government currently reports 465 persons named Camp. The governments of Canada, New Zealand, and South Africa do not currently provide lists of surnames as the UK and others do. Totals outside the English-speaking world are also unknown.

== Origins ==
People with the surname Camp have no single origin or ancestor, the name instead having been chosen by different families over a few centuries. The name is sometimes a variant spelling of "Kemp", which comes from the Old West Germanic "kampo-z", meaning "a contest, or fight", which in turn became the Old English "kemp", for a "fighter" or "soldier." However, the name usually denotes a family whose house was on an open field, or "camp", rather than in the woods or elsewhere. The word was borrowed from the Middle French "camp", its first use in English, in 1528, being for a "place where an army lodges temporarily", only later transferring to a non-military use sometime after 1560. The French "camp" (later "champ") is itself derived from the Latin "campus", which also meant an "open field", but also and especially an "open space for military exercise". Coincidentally, the word's martial sense had been borrowed by the Germanic tribes during their conflicts with the Romans to become the aforementioned "kampo-z".

Throughout the English-speaking world, but especially the United States, the name is sometimes derived from other, often longer, European names (e.g. the Italian "Campesi" or the Dutch "Van de Kamp") which were changed during the process of cultural assimilation. Camp can also be a shortening or anglicizing of similar French names, such as "de Camp" and "du Camp".

== Notable people with the Camp surname ==
- Adrienne Camp (born 1981), South African singer-songwriter
- Albert Sidney Camp (1892–1954), American politician, educator and lawyer
- Anna Camp (1982– ), American actress
- Bill Camp (1961-), American actor
- Billy Joe Camp, American politician
- Bob Camp (1954– ), American cartoonist and writer
- Candace Camp (1949– ), American novelist
- Charles Lewis Camp (1893–1975), American paleontologist and zoologist
- Colleen Camp (1953– ), American actress
- Cordelia Camp (1884–1973), American author and educator
- Dalton Camp (1920–2002), Canadian politician and commentator
- Darby Camp (2007– ), American actress
- Dave Camp (1953– ), American politician
- David M. Camp (1788–1871), American attorney and politician
- Donald Camp (1940– ), American artist, photographer, and professor
- Eldad Cicero Camp (1839–1920), American coal tycoon, attorney and philanthropist
- Emma Camp Mead (1866–1934), hotelkeeper and herbalist
- Frank Camp (1905–1986), American football coach
- Garrett Camp, American businessman
- Greg Camp (1967– ), American songwriter, guitarist and vocalist
- Hamilton Camp (1934–2005), English-American singer, songwriter, and actor
- Harold V. Camp (1935–2022), American lawyer, politician, and businessman
- Helen Page Camp (1930–1991), American actress
- Howie Camp (1893–1960), American baseball player
- Jack Tarpley Camp Jr. (1943– ), American former judge
- Jalen Camp (born 1998), American football player
- Jeremy Camp (1978– ), American Christian musician
- Jesse Camp (1979– ), American music television presenter
- Joe Camp (1939–2024), American film director
- John Lafayette Camp (1828–1891), American politician
- John Lafayette Camp Jr. (1855–1918), American politician
- John H. Camp (1840–1892), American politician
- John Newbold Camp (1908–1987), American politician
- Kid Camp (1869–1895), American baseball pitcher
- L. Jean Camp, American professor
- Laurie Smith Camp (1953–2020), American judge
- Lee Camp (comedian) (1981– ), American comedian
- Lee Camp (footballer) (1984– ), English football (soccer) player
- Lew Camp (1868–1948), American baseball player
- Rick Camp (1953–2013), American baseball pitcher
- Roger Camp (1946– ) American photographer and educator
- Shawn Camp (baseball) (1975– ), American baseball pitcher
- Shawn Camp (musician) (1966– ), American Country musician
- Steve Camp (1955– ), American Christian musician
- Walter Camp (1859–1925), American football coach and sports writer
- Walter Mason Camp (1867–1925), American author, railroad expert, and historian
- William B. Camp (1913–1975), American bureaucrat
- Wofford Benjamin Camp (1894–1986), American agronomist

== See also ==
- English diaspora
- United States census
- Census in the United Kingdom
- Census in Australia
- Census in Canada
- South African National Census of 2001
