= New Zealand census =

National population and housing census

- The New Zealand census is conducted by Statistics New Zealand.
- Status: Defunct
- Frequency: Every 5 years
- Country: New Zealand
- Inaugurated: 1 November 1851; 175 years ago
- Most recent: 7 March 2023; 3 years ago
- Website: stats.govt.nz

The New Zealand Census of Population and Dwellings (Māori: Te Tatauranga o ngā Tāngata Huri Noa i Aotearoa me ō rātou Whare Noho) was a national population and housing census conducted by Statistics New Zealand, a government department, every five years. There have been 34 censuses since 1851. In addition to providing detailed information about national demographics, the results of the census played an important part in the calculation of resource allocation to local service providers.

The 2023 census held on 7 March 2023 was the final census, with the results being released from 29 May 2024 to August 2025.

== Census date ==
Since 1926, the census was always held on a Tuesday and since 1966, the census always occurred in March. These are statistically the month and weekday on which New Zealanders are least likely to be travelling. The census forms had to be returned by midnight on census day for them to be valid.

== Conducting the census ==
Until 2018, census forms were hand-delivered by census workers during the lead-in to the census, with one form per person and a special form with questions about the dwelling. In addition, teams of census workers attempted to cover all hospitals, camp grounds, workplaces and transport systems where people might be found at midnight.

In 2018, the process was different. The majority of households received an access code in the post and were encouraged to complete their census online. If preferred, households could request paper census forms.

The 2023 census could be completed online or on paper forms. Forms with an access code were mailed out to householders from 20 February, but paper forms could be requested online or by telephone (free call 0800 CENSUS (0800 236–787)).

The smallest geographic unit used in the census for population data was the mesh block. There are 53,589 mesh blocks, with an average of 88 people in each.

== Data collected ==
The 2018 census collected data on the following topics:

Population structure
- Absentees
- Age*
- Legally registered relationship status
- Name*
- Number of children born
- Partnership status in current relationship
- Number of occupants on census night*
- Sex*
Location
- Dwelling address*
- Census night address*
- Usual residence*
- Usual residence one year ago
- Years at usual residence
Culture and Identity
- Birthplace
- Ethnicity*
- Iwi affiliation
- Languages spoken
- Māori descent*
- Religious affiliation
- Years since arrival in New Zealand
Education and training
- Field of study
- Highest qualification
- Highest secondary school qualification
- Level of post-school qualification
- Study participation
Work
- Hours worked in employment per week
- Industry
- Occupation
- Sector of ownership
- Status in employment
- Unpaid activities
- Work and labour force status
- Workplace address
Income
- Sources of personal income
- Total personal income
Families and households
- Child dependency status
- Extended families
- Family type
- Household composition
Housing
- Access to basic amenities
- Access to telecommunication systems
- Dwelling counts (occupied, unoccupied, under construction)
- Dwelling dampness indicator
- Dwelling mould indicator
- Individual home ownership
- Main types of heating
- Number of rooms*
- Number of bedrooms
- Occupied dwelling type
- Sector of landlord
- Tenure of household*
- Weekly rent paid by households
Transport
- Education institution address
- Main means of travel to education
- Main means of travel to work
- Number of motor vehicles
Health and disability
- Cigarette smoking behaviour
- Disability/activity limitations

* Required to be included under the Statistics Act 1975 or the Electoral Act 1993

== History ==
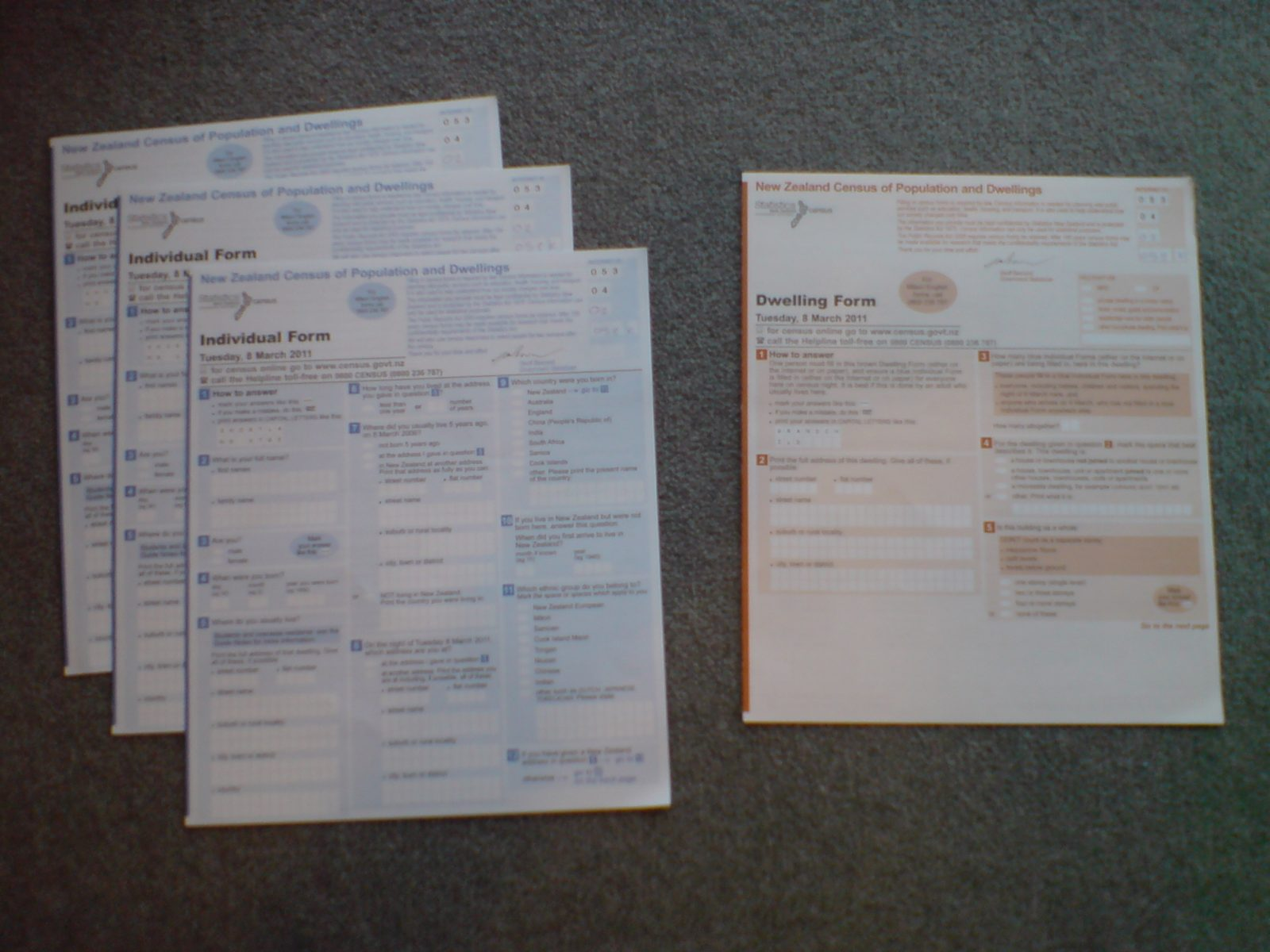
Forms that were intended for the (cancelled) 2011 census. At left, the forms for individual persons surveyed; at right, a form for the overall household. The 2013 census forms were identical, save for the dates.

The first full census in New Zealand was conducted in 1851, and the census was triennial until 1881, at which time it became five-yearly. The 1931 census was cancelled due to the effects of the Great Depression, as was the 1941 census due to World War II. The 1946 census was brought forward to Tuesday 25 September 1945, so that the results could be used for an electoral redistribution (the first for ten years) before the 1946 election.

1951 was the first year in which Māori and European New Zealanders were treated equally, with European New Zealanders having had a different census form in previous years and separate censuses in the nineteenth century. Results for those censuses before 1966 have been destroyed with a few exceptions and those since will not be available before 2066.

The 2006 census was held on Tuesday, 7 March. For the first time, respondents had the option of completing their census form online rather than by a printed form.

The 2011 census was scheduled for Tuesday, 8 March. However, due to the Christchurch earthquake on 22 February 2011, it was cancelled. For the first time ever, all 2011 census forms would have been digitally archived. On 27 May 2011 Statistics New Zealand announced that a census would take place in March 2013. The legislation required to change the census date was introduced to Parliament in August 2011.

The 2013 census was held on Tuesday 5 March 2013 and the 2018 census was held on Tuesday 6 March 2018. The 2018 census faced wide criticism for low response rates, a poor rollout of the online component of the census and delays. This resulted in an independent review of the census process, and the resignation of the then-Chief Executive of Statistics New Zealand Liz MacPherson.

The 2023 census was held on Tuesday, 7 March (despite Statistics New Zealand initially not ruling out a delay due to the effects of Cyclone Gabrielle), and it implemented measures that aimed to increase the census' effectiveness in response to the issues faced with the 2018 census, including supporting Māori to complete the census. It also included new questions on topics such as gender, sexual identity, and disabilities/health conditions.

On 18 June 2025, the Statistics Minister Shane Reti announced that the Government would replace the five-yearly census in 2030 with a combination of administrative data from other government agencies and smaller annual surveys that a sample of the population will complete. There will be no census in 2028 with the 2023 census being the final one. Reti said that the traditional census was "no longer financially viable", stating "despite the unsustainable and escalating costs, successive censuses have been beset with issues or failed to meet expectations." Acting Statistics New Zealand chief and Government Statistician Mary Craig welcomed the scrapping of the traditional census, citing rising costs, declining survey response rates and disruptions such as Cyclone Gabrielle in 2023. By contrast, University of Waikato Institute for Population Research senior research fellow Dr Jesse Whitehead and New Zealand Institute of Economic Research economist Bill Kaye expressed concern that discontinuing the five-year census would impact data equity and have an adverse impact on "marginalised" communities including Māori, Pasifika, LGBTQ, disabled and ethnic communities.

== Evasion of the census ==
A few people objected to the census and attempted to evade it. As early as 1859, a resident was prosecuted for not completing his census form. The most famous of these census evaders was The Wizard of New Zealand, Ian Brackenbury Channell, who avoided the census on numerous occasions. He spent the night of the 1981 census in a boat beyond New Zealand's 20 kilometres (12 mi) territorial limit in order to avoid enumeration in the country. He also publicly burnt census forms.

Following the 2006 census, Statistics New Zealand prosecuted 72 people for failing to return their forms, with 41 convictions. After the 2013 census, they wrote to 450 people in July 2013 who had failed to return the forms, of whom 99 were prosecuted, resulting in 46 convictions. Most of those convicted faced two charges and were fined $50 to $500 per charge.

== Controversy ==
In June 2024, allegations surfaced that workers and volunteers at Manuwera Marae had collected citizens' private information from 2023 census forms, creating a database to target Māori voters in the general election held later in 2023. Takutai Tarsh Kemp was the chief executive of the marae at the time and was also a candidate for Te Pāti Māori, later narrowly winning a seat at the 2023 general election.

== Results ==
Results of the 2013 census were released over an 18-month period, beginning 15 October 2013. It recorded 4,242,048 people who were resident in New Zealand on 5 March 2013. This represents an increase of 214,101 people (5.3 percent) since the 2006 census.

Results from the 2018 census were released to the public on 23 September 2019. The population of New Zealand was counted as 4,699,755 – an increase of 457,707 (10.79%) over the 2013 census.

On 30 June 2023, the field collection phase of the 2023 census ended with an estimated 89–91% of the New Zealand population having participated. Results of the 2023 census will be released from May 2024 to August 2025, starting on 29 May 2024.

=== By year ===
| Year | Population |
|---|---|
| 1851 | |
| 1858 | 115,462 |
| 1861 | |
| 1864 | |
| 1867 | |
| 1871 | |
| 1874 | 344,984 |
| 1878 | 458,007 |
| 1881 | 534,030 |
| 1886 | 620,451 |
| 1891 | 668,651 |
| 1896 | 743,214 |

| Year | Population |
|---|---|
| 1901 | 815,862 |
| 1906 | 936,309 |
| 1911 | 1,058,312 |
| 1916 | 1,149,225 |
| 1921 | 1,271,668 |
| 1926 | 1,408,139 |
| 1936 | 1,573,812 |
| 1945 | 1,702,330 |
| 1951 | 1,939,472 |
| 1956 | 2,174,062 |
| 1961 | 2,414,984 |
| 1966 | 2,676,919 |

| Year | Population |
|---|---|
| 1971 | 2,862,631 |
| 1976 | 3,129,383 |
| 1981 | 3,175,737 |
| 1986 | 3,307,084 |
| 1991 | 3,434,950 |
| 1996 | 3,681,546 |
| 2001 | 3,820,750 |
| 2006 | 4,116,900 |
| 2013 | 4,242,048 |
| 2018 | 4,699,755 |
| 2023 | 4,993,923 |
