= English New Zealanders =

Total population
- 2 million (of full or partial ancestry)

Regions with significant populations
- Nation-wide

Languages
- English (English and New Zealand)

Religion
- Historically or traditionally Christianity, usually Anglican or other Protestant, with smaller Catholic minority. Increasingly irreligious

Related ethnic groups
- Pākehā

English New Zealanders are New Zealanders of English descent, or English-born people currently living in New Zealand. After British explorer James Cook arrived in New Zealand in 1769, many non-Polynesians began to visit and settle in New Zealand, particularly whalers, sealers, and ex-convicts from Australia, often of British (including English) ancestry. After New Zealand became a colony of Britain in 1840, the country began to receive thousands of immigrants, with over 90% of them being from Britain and Ireland and about half of them coming from England.

== Early settlement ==
A 19th-century English company the "New Zealand Company" played a key role in colonising New Zealand. The company was formed to carry out the principles of systematic colonisation devised by Edward Gibbon Wakefield, who envisaged the creation of a new-model English society in the Southern Hemisphere.

Of New Zealand's English immigrants, most of them predominately originated from the south-west counties of Cornwall and Devon, with significant numbers also coming from England's southeast of London and Kent.

Due to British colonisation, and the large numbers of English immigrants from the 19th century, English culture and language profoundly impacted New Zealand society. For instance, English is the predominant and most widely spoken language, with approximately 4.4 million speakers (c. 95% of the population) as of the 2018 census. Also, based on the same census, England has remained the most common place from which immigrants to New Zealand come.

In 1840, Britain officially annexed the islands of New Zealand and founded the first permanent English settlement in Wellington. That same year, the Māori people signed the Treaty of Waitangi, which acknowledged British sovereignty in return for assurances regarding their land ownership. Nevertheless, armed conflicts over territory between the Maori and European settlers persisted until 1870, by which time there were very few Maori remaining to oppose the European expansion. English colonists fought the Maori during the New Zealand Wars.

=== Legacy ===
As of the early 21st century, it is estimated that at least 80% of New Zealanders have some British ancestry, which mainly includes English given that at least half of immigrants from the United Kingdom were English. Over 50 percent of New Zealand’s founding ethnic group were born in England as seen per the 1851 New Zealand census. What this demonstrates is that out of a population of 5 million, around 2 million people in New Zealand are of English ancestry, likely making the English diaspora one of, if not the largest ethnic group in the country.

== Birthplace ==
The population born in England and proportion (percent) of New Zealand at every census from 1851 to present. Data shows that the English reached 50.5% of the total population in 1851.

Population born in England
Year	Population	%	Ref(s)
1851	13,485	50.5	
1861	36,128	36.5	
1871	67,044	26.1	
1881	119,224	24.33	
1901	111,964	14.50	
1911	133,811	13.28	
1916	140,997	12.84	
1961	154,869	6.4	
2001	178,203	4.77	
2006	202,401	4.9	
2013	215,589	5.1	
2018	210,915	4.49	
2023	208,428	4.20	

== Population ==
As of the 2018 New Zealand census, about 260,000 (8.3%) Europeans in the country stated that they were born in the United Kingdom, making the UK the most common place of origin for immigrants to New Zealand. England, in particular, has always been a significant source of immigration. This was very much the case in the 19th century, where emigration from England ranged from 64.7% in the 1840s, to 49.7% by the 1871 census.

== English culture in New Zealand ==
Some of the most popular sports in New Zealand such as cricket, netball, rugby union, and league, are of English origin.

== See also ==
- British New Zealanders
- New Zealander Britons
- English diaspora
