= Senator Camp =

Senator Camp may refer to:

- David M. Camp (1788–1871), Vermont State Senate
- John Lafayette Camp (1828–1891), Texas State Senate
- John Lafayette Camp Jr. (1855–1918), Texas State Senate
