= John Camp =

John Camp may refer to:

== Politicians ==
- John E. Camp (1915–1988), Iowa state representative
- John H. Camp (1840–1892), U.S. Representative from New York
- John H. Camp (Tennessee politician) (1783–1829), American politician from Tennessee
- John Lafayette Camp (1828–1891), Texas state senator
- John Lafayette Camp, Jr. (1855–1918), Texas state senator
- John Newbold Camp (1908–1987), U.S. Representative from Oklahoma
- John Camp (English politician), MP for Cambridge (UK Parliament constituency)

== Other ==
- John Sandford (novelist) a.k.a. John Camp (born 1944), Pulitzer Prize–winning journalist and novelist
