= English diaspora =

English emigrants and their descendants

Regions with significant populations
- 47.6 million (67.1% identified with English identity) in England and Wales
- Significant English diaspora in
- United States: 46,550,968
- Australia: 8,385,928
- Canada: 6,263,880
- South Africa: 1,000,000
- New Zealand: 72,204–210,915
- India: 300,000

Languages
- English

Religion
- Christianity: Predominantly Protestantism (Anglicanism • Methodism • Baptists • Congregationalism • Other Protestants) • Mormonism • Roman Catholicism; Neopaganism (including Wicca) • Irreligious

The English diaspora consists of English people and their descendants who emigrated from England. The diaspora is concentrated in the English-speaking world in countries such as the United States, Canada, Australia, New Zealand, Scotland, Ireland, Wales, South Africa, and to a lesser extent, Zimbabwe, India, Zambia and continental Europe.

== Origins of the diaspora ==
The first notable exodus of English-speakers began in the years following the Norman Conquest of England, the majority of them being aristocrats and their retinues, who had become dispossessed of their manors and titles by the invading Normans. Some went to neighboring lands in Scotland, Ireland and Scandinavia, but many fled to the Byzantine Empire where they were said to have settled an area they named New England along the Black Sea, likely Crimea, and garrisoned a castle called Kibatos on the coast of Anatolia. The Emperor's Varangian Guard then became mostly Englishmen.

The first deliberate and organized English diaspora began when English Catholics exiled themselves from Henry VIII's religious policies to Habsburg lands, especially the nearest Catholic intellectual centre, the University of Louvain (in present-day Belgium) which was by the late 1540s a bastion of ultra-orthodoxy. This was redoubled by a further wave of emigration under Edward VI's more radically Protestant regime.

== Age of Discovery ==
After the Age of Discovery, the native peoples of England were among the earliest and by far the largest communities to emigrate out of Europe, and English overseas expansion beginning in the 16th century, followed by the British Empire's expansion during the first half of the 19th century saw an extraordinary dispersion of English people, with particular concentrations in North America and Australasia.

The British Empire was "built on waves of migration overseas by British peoples", who left the island of Great Britain, reaching across the globe and permanently affecting population structures in three continents. What became the United States was "easily the greatest single destination of emigrant British", but in the Federation of Australia the British ethnic groups experienced a birth rate higher than anything seen before, resulting in them becoming the dominant ethnic groups in Australia.

== Americas ==
=== Argentina ===
English settlers arrived in Buenos Aires in 1806 (then a Spanish colony) in small numbers, mostly as businessmen, when Argentina was an emerging nation and the settlers were welcomed for the stability they brought to commercial life. As the 19th century progressed more English families arrived, and many bought land to develop the potential of the Argentine pampas for the large-scale growing of crops. The English founded banks, developed the export trade in crops and animal products and imported the luxuries that the growing Argentine middle classes sought.

As well as those who went to Argentina as industrialists and major landowners, others went as railway engineers, civil engineers and to work in banking and commerce. Others went to become whalers, missionaries and simply to seek out a future. English families sent second and younger sons, or what were described as the black sheep of the family, to Argentina to make their fortunes in cattle and wheat. English settlers introduced football to Argentina. Some English families owned sugar plantations.

English culture, or a version of it as perceived from outside, had a noted effect on the culture of Argentina, mainly in the middle classes. In 1888 local Anglo-Argentines established the Hurlingham Club, based on its namesake in London. The city of Hurlingham, Buenos Aires and Hurlingham Partido in Buenos Aires Province later grew up around the club and took their names from it. The Córdoba Athletic Club, one of the oldest sports clubs in Argentina, was founded in 1882 by Englishmen that lived in Córdoba working in the railways.

There are about 1,000,000 people of English descent in Argentina.

=== Canada ===
In the Canada 2016 Census, 'English' was the most common ethnic origin (ethnic origin refers to the ethnic or cultural group(s) to which the respondent's ancestors belong) recorded by respondents; 6,320,085 people or 18.3% of the population self-identified themselves as wholly or partly English. On the other hand, people identifying as Canadian but not English may have previously identified as English before the option of identifying as Canadian was available.

=== Chile ===
Chileans of English ancestry are estimated to number 1,000,000

When the Port of Valparaíso opened to free trade in 1811, the English began to congregate in Valparaíso. The first to arrive brought with them tools, articles of china, wool and cotton, with instructions to return with copper and hemp. This was the first exchange of what would become a deep-rooted commercial relationship between the UK and Chile.

In Valparaíso they constructed their largest and most important colony, developing neighborhoods of English character, schools, social, sports clubs, business organizations and periodicals. This influence is apparent in some areas of Chilean society today, such as the bank and the national marina, as well as in certain social activities popular in the country, such as football, horse racing, and drinking tea.

The English in the city eventually numbered more than 32,000 in the port's boom period during the saltpeter bonanza at the end of the 19th and beginning of the 20th centuries. The British colonial influence is important to understand the port's boom and bust.

The English colony was also important in the northern zone of the country during the saltpeter boom, in the ports of Iquique and Pisagua. The King of Saltpeter, John Thomas North, was the principal backer of nitrate mining. The English legacy was reflected in the streets of the historic district of the city of Iquique, with the foundation of various institutions, such as the Club Hípico (Racing Club). Nevertheless, their presence came to an end with the saltpeter crisis during the 1930s.

An important contingent of English immigrants also settled in the present-day region of Magallanes. In the same way, they established English families in other areas of the country, such as Santiago, Coquimbo, the Araucanía, and Chiloé.

=== Nicaragua ===
English people along the Caribbean Coast, or Miskito Coast, of Nicaragua began in 1633. The area was controlled by Britain until 1860, and eventually integrated into Nicaragua by 1894. The Miskito Coast region divided into two autonomous regions within Nicaragua after 1987. The first English settlers of the Miskito Coast arrived in 1633, exchanging products through primitive trade with the Miskitos. The English exchanged manufactured goods such as guns, machetes, beds, mirrors etc., in exchange for cocoa, animal skins, sarsaparilla, rubber, wood, and turtle shells. The formation of an English colony in the region led Spain to protest, but England managed to create a colony on the Caribbean Coast. This colony had two different, but complementary, production methods; one a capitalist basis and the other communal.

=== Paraguay ===
The English people in Paraguay mostly arrived during the colonial period as investors and industrialists. They were noted throughout the Southern cone region of Paraguay as being skilled farmers, investors, and bankers and as having created many of the regions railways and settled vast tracts of land.

In the modern day however it is assumed most have become a part of the wider Paraguayan ethnicity, although there are still some in Paraguay who identify as "English". The English indirectly and probably inadvertently played a major part in Paraguay's continual existence, because the British Empire had invested heavily throughout South America, including Paraguay.

=== United States ===
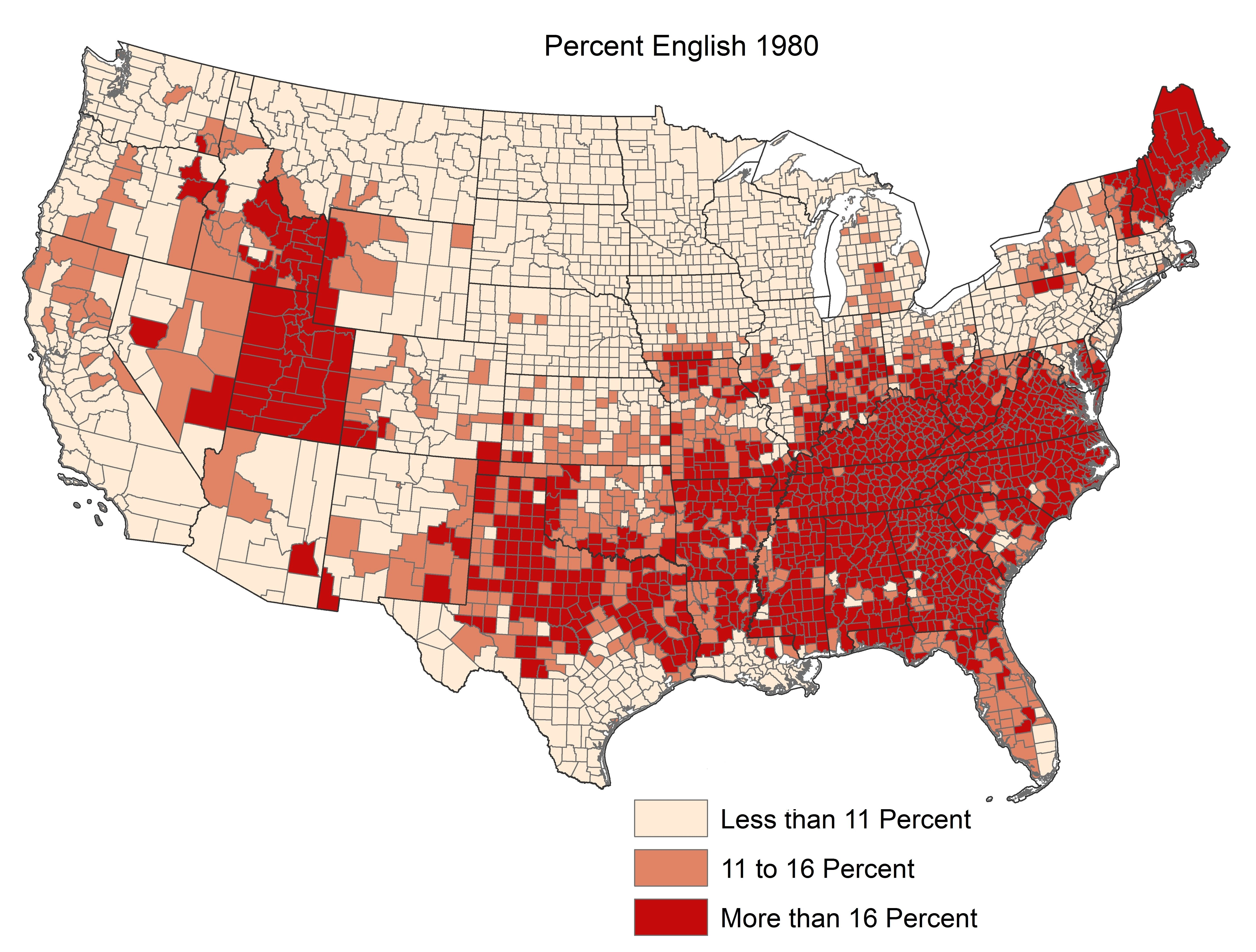
Percentages by county in the 1980 census.

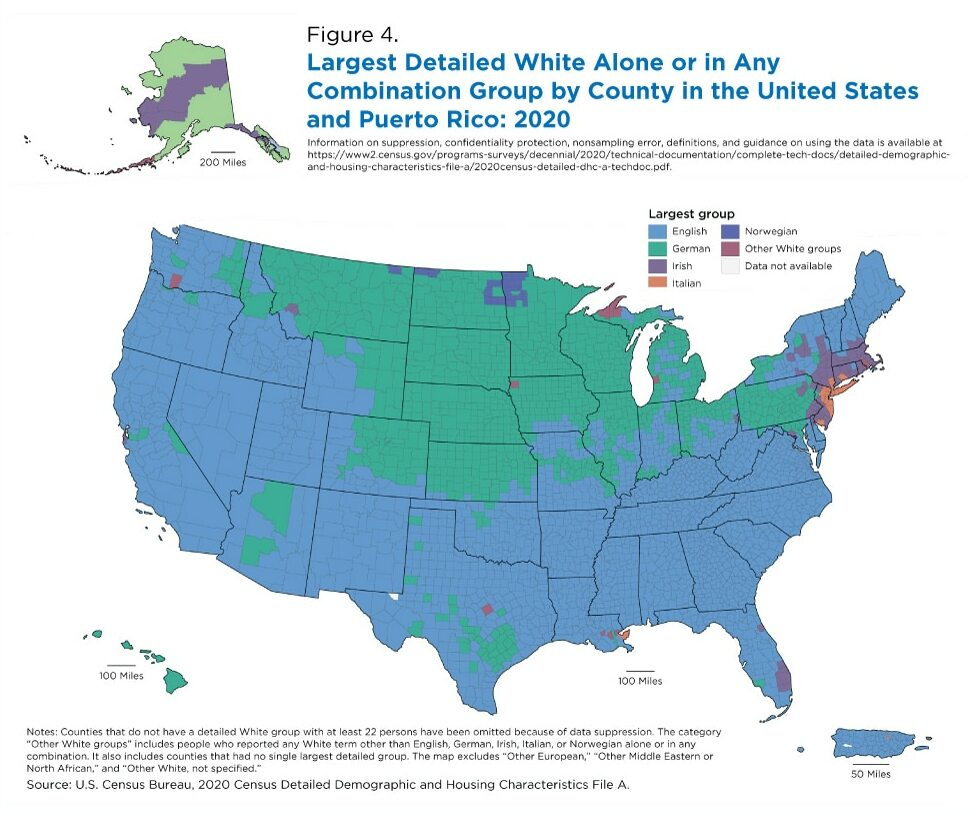
Most common ancestries in the 2020 census. English is in blue.

English immigration began in the 1500s. Sir Walter Raleigh led expeditions to North America in order to found new settlements and find gold and named Virginia in honor of Elizabeth, the Virgin Queen. In 1585 Sir Walter Raleigh sent several shiploads of colonists to the 'New World', who settled on Roanoke Island. It was here that Eleanor White Dare gave birth to a daughter, Virginia Dare, the first child born of English parents in America. The first immigrants mysteriously disappeared and Roanoke was given the nickname of "the Lost Colony".

English settlement in America recommenced with Jamestown in the Virginia Colony in 1607. With the permission of James I, three ships (the Susan Constant, The Discovery and The God Speed) sailed from England and landed at Cape Henry in April, under the captainship of Christopher Newport, who had been hired by the London Company to lead expeditions to what is now America. In 1620 another religious group left England in search of religious freedom. This group was called the Puritans who represented the next wave of English immigration to America. The 'Great Migration' between 1620 and 1640 to America led to the establishment of the first Thirteen Colonies. It is estimated that over 50,000 undertook the 3,000-mile (5,000-kilometre) journey to America during the Great Migration.

The overwhelming majority of the Founding Fathers of the United States of America were of English extraction, including Benjamin Franklin, George Washington, John Adams, James Madison, Thomas Jefferson, and Alexander Hamilton.

=== Estimates and census data ===
1700-1790 estimates
Year	Population	%	Ref(s)
1700	200,710	80.0	
1755	-	52.0	
1775	-	48.7	
1790	1,897,810	48.3	
Census results
1980	49,598,035	26.3	
1990	32,651,788	13.1	
2000	24,515,138	8.7	
2020	46,550,968	14.0	

The table shows the English population old stock estimates from 1700 to 1790. In 1700 the total population of the American colonies was 250,888 of which 223,071 (89%) were white and 80% were ethnically English and Welsh.

In the 2020 United States census, English Americans (46.6 million or 19.8% of white Americans) were the most common ancestral group, followed by German Americans (45 million) and Irish Americans at 38.6 million.

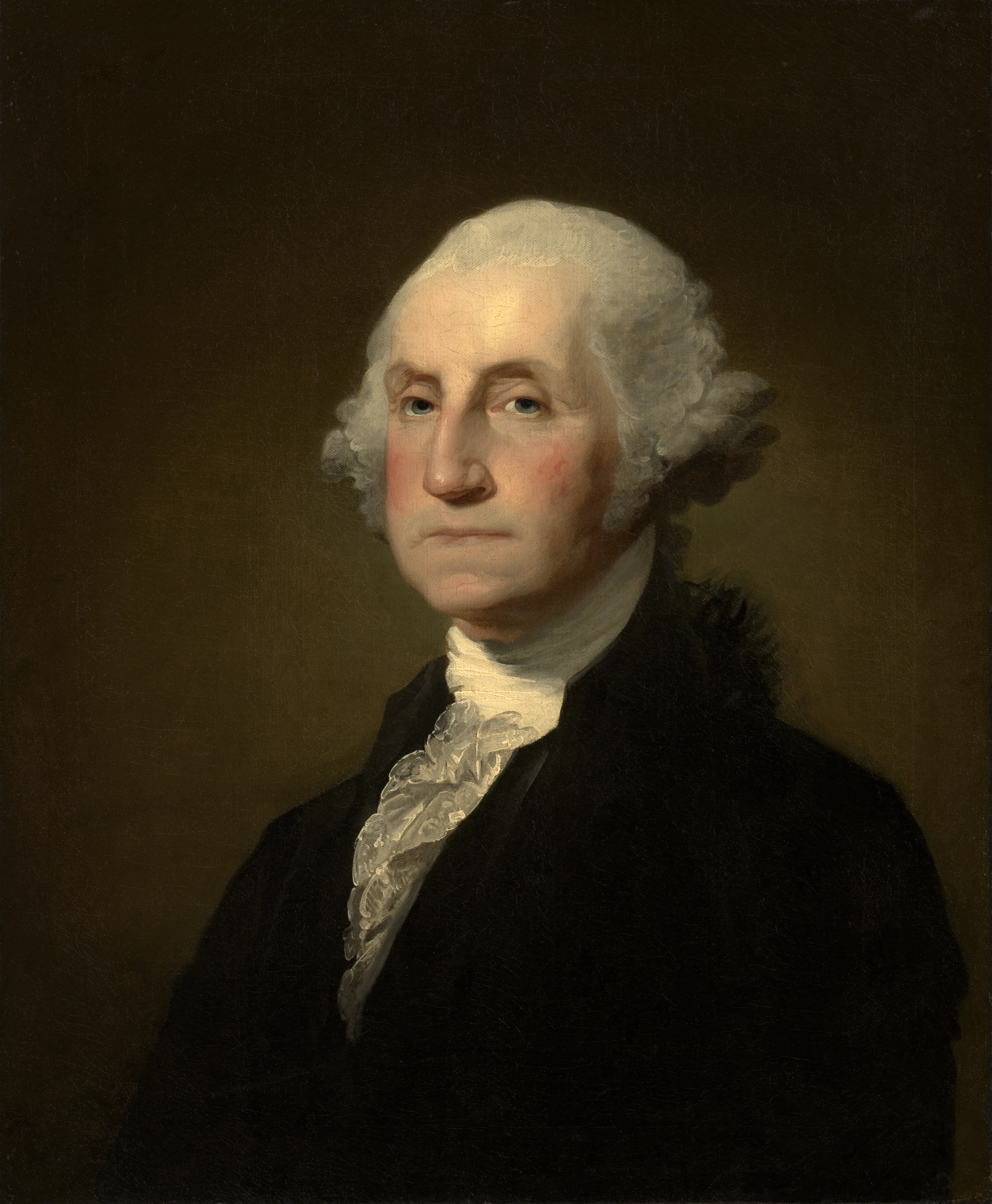
George Washington highlighted as being the "father of his country" was of English descent.

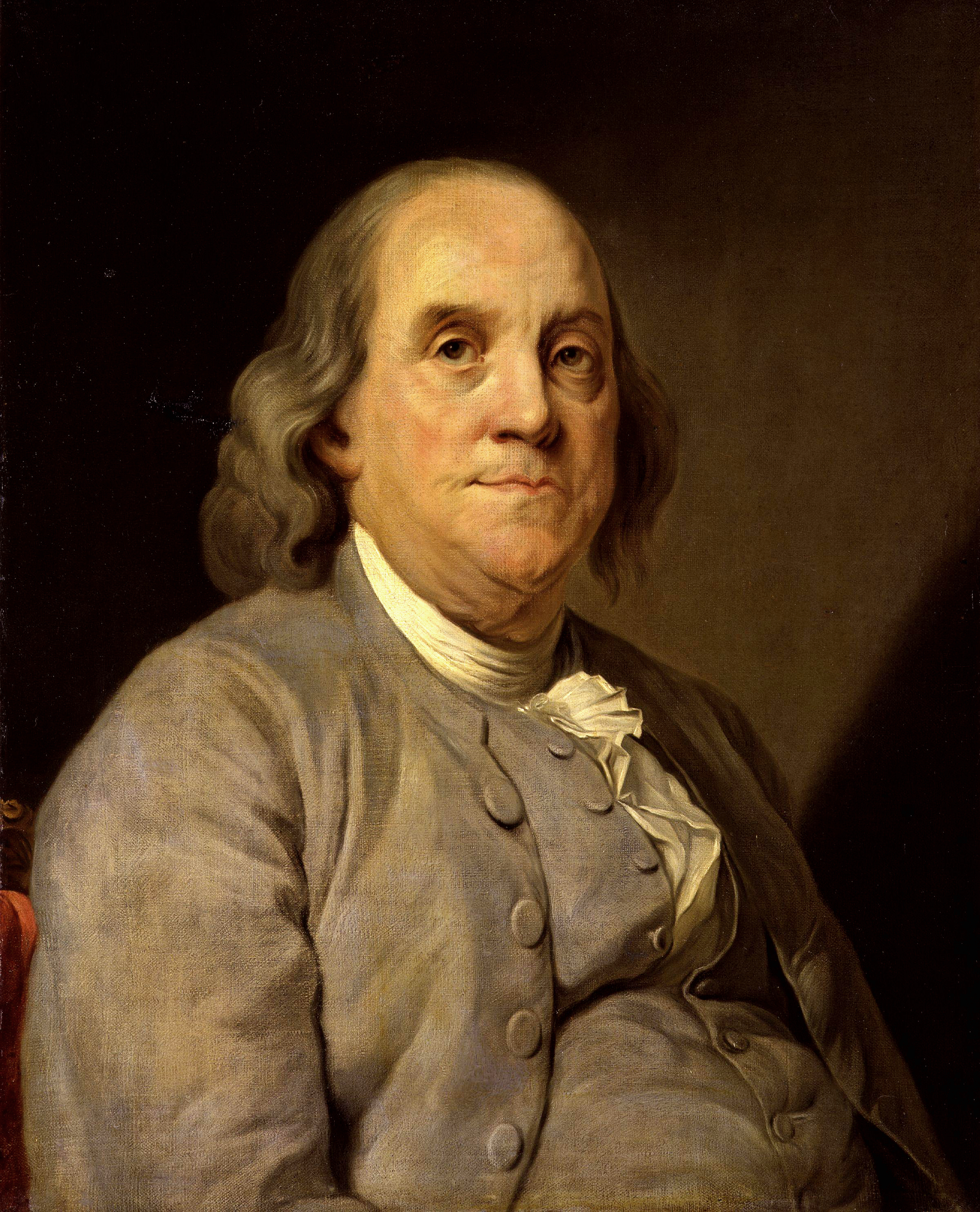
Benjamin Franklin had English roots on both sides.

However, demographers regard this as an undercount, as the index of inconsistency is high and many, if not most, people from English stock have a tendency (since the introduction of a new 'American' category in the 2000 census) to identify as simply Americans or if of mixed European ancestry, identify with a more recent and differentiated ethnic group. In the 1980 United States Census, over 49 million (49,598,035) Americans claimed English ancestry, at the time around 26.34% of the total population and largest reported group which, even today, would make them the largest ethnic group in the United States. Scots-Irish Americans are descendants of Lowland Scots and Northern English (specifically: County Durham, Cumberland, Yorkshire, Northumberland and Westmorland) settlers who colonised Ireland during the Plantation of Ulster in the 17th century.

Americans of English heritage are often seen, and identify, as simply "American" due to the many historic cultural ties between England and the U.S. and their influence on the country's population. Relative to ethnic groups of other European origins, this may be due to the early establishment of English settlements; as well as to non-English groups having emigrated in order to establish significant communities.

== Asia-Pacific ==
English ancestry
Census	Population	%	% change	Ref(s)
1986	6,607,228	42.3	Steady	
2001	6,358,880	33.9	▼	
2006	6,283,647	31.6	▼	
2011	7,238,533	33.7	▲ +15.2%	
2016	7,852,224	36.1	▲	

=== Australia ===
Australia's biggest city Sydney was founded by the British government as a penal colony. Visitors described the English character of Sydney for at least the first 50 years after 1788, noting the traditional English appearance of the churches overlooking the convict barracks. First-generation Sydney residents, other than the diminished population of Aboriginal people, were predominantly English. 160,000 convicts came to Australia between 1788 and 1850. Between 1788 and 1840, 80,000 English convicts were transported to New South Wales, with the greatest numbers coming between 1825 and 1835. The New South Wales Census of 1846 accounted for 57,349 born in England.

From the beginning of the colonial era until the mid-20th century, the vast majority of settlers to Australia were from the British Isles, with the English being the dominant group, followed by the Irish and Scottish. Among the leading ancestries, increases in Australian, Irish, and German ancestries and decreases in English, Scottish, and Welsh ancestries appear to reflect such shifts in perception or reporting. These reporting shifts at least partly resulted from changes in the design of the census question, in particular the introduction of a tick box format in 2001.

Until 1859, 2.2 million (73%) of the free settlers who immigrated were British.

Shows English ancestry responses in 2011 census.

Australians of English descent, are both the single largest ethnic group in Australia and the largest 'ancestry' identity in the Australian census. In the 2016 census, 7.8 million or 25.0% of respondents identified as "English" or a combination including English, a numerical increase from 7.2 million over the 2011 census figure. The census also documented 907,572 residents or 3.9% of Australia as being born in England, and are the largest overseas-born population.

English migrants and English Australians were by far the single most influential ethnic group in colonial Australia.

=== New Zealand ===
New Zealand's foundational culture was English, given the strong representation in the mid and late-nineteenth century with the English being the largest in migration inflows. A 19th-century English company the "New Zealand Company" played a key role in the colonisation of New Zealand. The company was formed to carry out the principles of systematic colonisation devised by Edward Gibbon Wakefield, who envisaged the creation of a new-model English society in the Southern Hemisphere.

James Cook claimed New Zealand for Britain on his arrival in 1769. The establishment of British colonies in Australia from 1788 and the boom in whaling and sealing in the Southern Ocean brought many Europeans to the vicinity of New Zealand. By 1830 there was a population of about 800 non Māori which included a total of about 200 runaway convicts and seamen. The seamen often lived in New Zealand for a short time before joining another ship a few months later. In 1839 there were 1100 Europeans living in the North Island.

Year	England-born	%	Ref(s)
1851	13,485	50.5	
1861	36,128	36.5	
1871	67,044	26.1	
1881	119,224	24.33	
1901	111,964	14.50	
1911	133,811	13.28	
1916	140,997	12.84	
1961	154,869	-	
2001	178,203	-	
2006	202,401	-	
2013	215,589	5.1	
2018	210,915	4.49	

The Canterbury Association was founded in London on 27 March 1848 and incorporated by Royal Charter on 13 November 1849. They recruited settlers from the south of England, creating a definite English influence over that region. In the 1860s most migrants settled in the South Island due to gold discoveries and the availability of flat grass covered land for pastoral farming.

==== Data ====
From 1840, the English constituted the largest single group among New Zealand's overseas-born, consistently being over 50 percent, sometimes 60 percent of those who were born in the United Kingdom and Ireland. Despite their prominence as migrants, at no point after the early 1850s did the English-born constitute a majority of the colonial population. In the 1851 Census, just over half (50.5%) the total population was born in England, this proportion then fell to 36.5% (1861) and 24.3% by 1881. In 2013, there were 215,589 English-born representing 21.5% of all overseas-born residents or 5 percent of the total population and is still the most-common birthplace outside New Zealand. In the recent 2018 census, 210,915 were born in England or 4.49% of the total population, a slight decrease from 2013.

== Europe ==
=== Ireland ===
Plantations in 16th- and 17th-century Ireland were the confiscation of land by the English crown and the colonisation of this land with settlers from England (particularly the Border Counties) and the Scottish Lowlands. They followed smaller-scale immigration to Ireland as far back as the 12th century, which had resulted in a distinct ethnicity in Ireland known as the Old English.

The 16th-century plantations were established throughout the country by the confiscation of lands occupied by Gaelic clans and Hiberno-Norman dynasties, but principally in the provinces of Munster and Ulster. The Crown granted these lands to colonists ("planters") from England. This process began during the reign of Henry VIII and continued under Mary I and Elizabeth I. It was accelerated under James I, Charles I and Oliver Cromwell; in their time, land was also granted to Scottish planters.

The early plantations in the 16th century tended to be based on small "exemplary" colonies. The later plantations were based on mass confiscations of land from Irish landowners and the subsequent importation of numerous settlers and labourers from England and Wales, and later from Scotland. The final official plantations were established under the English Commonwealth and Cromwell's Protectorate during the 1650s, when thousands of Parliamentarian soldiers were settled in Ireland. Apart from the plantations, significant immigration into Ireland continued well into the 18th century, from both Great Britain and continental Europe. The plantations changed the demography of Ireland by creating large communities with a British and Protestant identity.

=== Poland ===
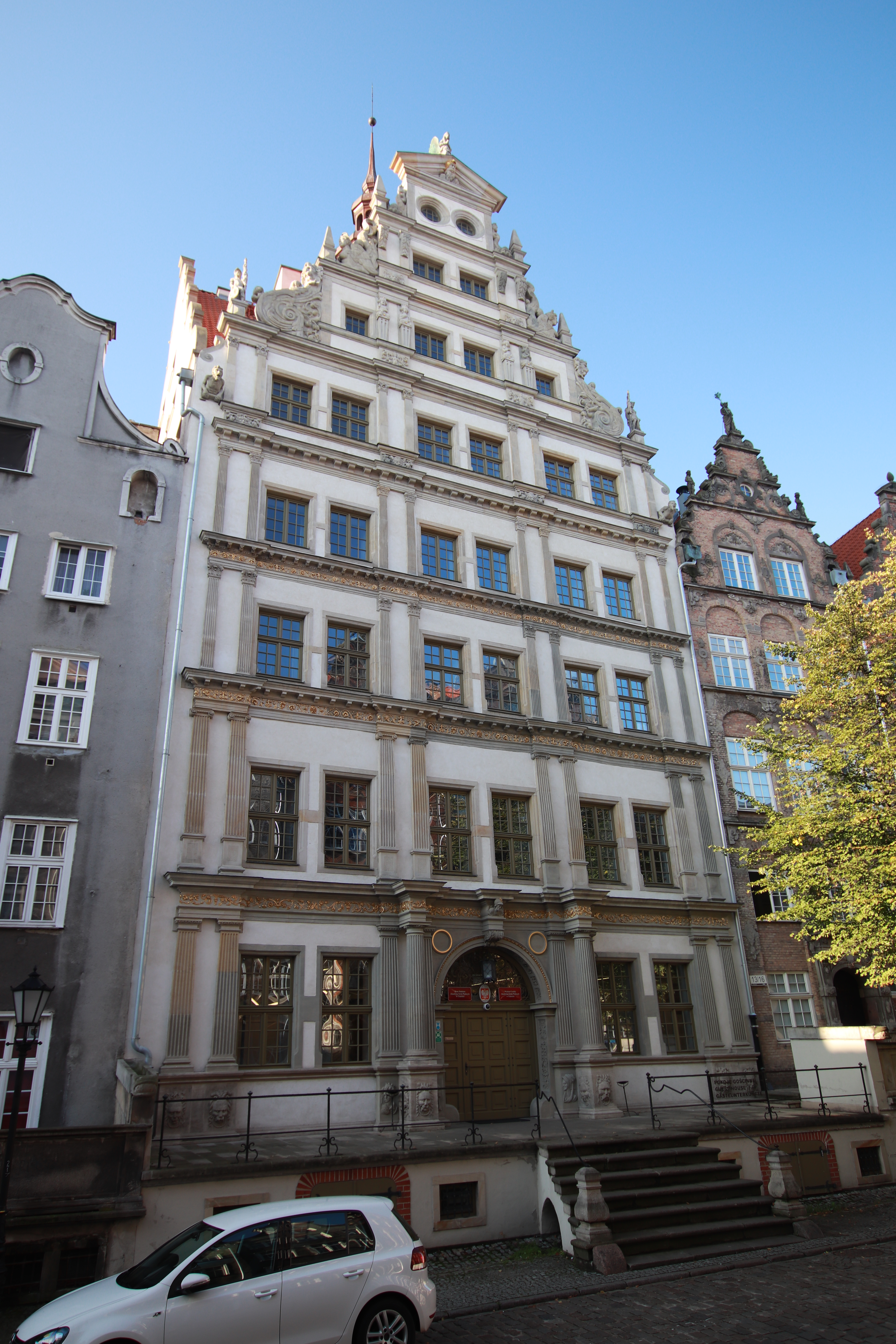
The so-called "English House" in Gdańsk, former meeting place of English merchants in 1640–1690

English immigration to the Kingdom of Poland, dating back to early modern times, was significantly smaller than Scottish immigration. English immigrants were often merchants and mercenaries, however, the last major recruitment to the Polish Army in England and Scotland was conducted in 1633. There were also some scholars and students, including Leonard Cox, humanist, professor at the Kraków Academy. The English rather quickly assimilated with the Polish population.

Some English industrialists migrated to Poland in the 19th century. The Evans brothers founded Poland's first factory for agricultural machinery and tools in Warsaw in 1822.

According to the 1921 Polish census, the largest English populations lived in the cities of Warsaw (169), Łódź and Lwów (31 each).

In the 2011 Polish census, 10,495 people declared English nationality, of which 9,132 declared both Polish and English nationality.

In the 2021 Polish census, 54,424 people declared English nationality, it was seventh biggest nationality in Poland.

== See also ==
- English-speaking world
