= German Church, Christchurch =

German Church
- German Protestant Church
- German: Deutsche Kirche
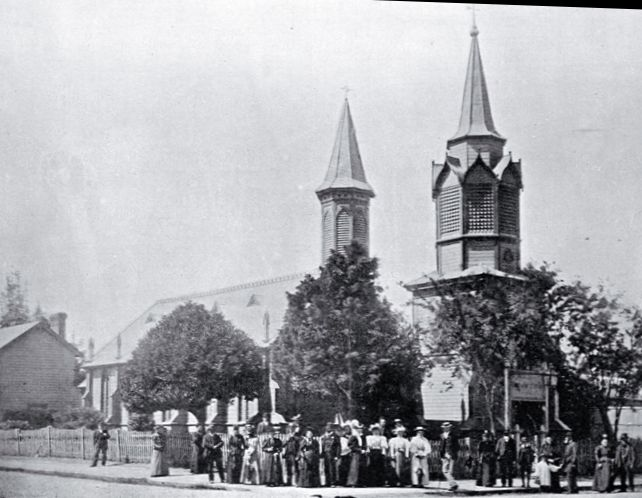
- The German Church in 1898
- German Church
- 43°31′50″S 172°37′53″E
- Location: Corner Worcester and Montreal Streets, Christchurch
- Country: New Zealand
- Previous denomination: Lutheran

History
- Status: Parish church (1874 – 1881); Community hall (1882 – 1918); Government property (1918 – 1933)

Architecture
- Architect: Isaac Jacobsen
- Style: Gothic Revival
- Groundbreaking: November 1872
- Completed: 14 May 1874
- Construction cost: NZ£1000
- Demolished: 1933

Specifications
- Capacity: 230
- Materials: Timber

The German Church (German: Deutsche Kirche), also known as German Protestant Church, was a Lutheran church in Christchurch, New Zealand. It was built in 1872 when Christchurch had a growing German population.

After the congregation encountered financial struggles in the 1880s, the church building was sold to private hands and operated as a community hall. The church building was confiscated in 1918 by the New Zealand Government and the church bells melted down in the aftermath of World War I when there were strong anti-German feelings in New Zealand. The church building was demolished in 1933 and made way for a parish hall. The site of the Deutsche Kirche is today occupied by the Christchurch Art Gallery.

== Establishment ==
In the early 1870s, Canterbury experienced significant immigration. Between the 1871 and 1874 census, the region had 25% growth in population. By 1874, Germans made up about 6% of the foreign-born population of Canterbury. The Deutsche Kirche came from an initiative of German Lutherans living in Canterbury, with German baker and hotel keeper George Ruddenklau presiding over a committee in charge of getting the church built. The intention was to collect sufficient funds through subscription lists and if successful, send for a German minister and have a church constructed. From early April 1872, the organising committee advertised for a central city site for cash purchase. Later that month, auctioneer Herbert Edward Alport reported that he had completed the sale of a quarter acre section on the corner of Worcester and Montreal Streets; the land had been sold for £230. In May 1872, Thomas Joynt moved in the Canterbury Provincial Council that a grant of £230 be given towards the erection of the church. Of those who spoke to the motion, Arthur Charles Knight, Walter Kennaway (as provincial secretary), John Thomas Peacock, Edward Richardson, and William Cowlishaw (provincial treasurer) supported the motion. John Inglis, Colonel De Renzie Brett, George Buckley and George Healey spoke against the motion. When put to a vote, the motion was passed by 22 votes to 14. In the end, the provincial government provided £250.

The position as pastor was offered to Reverend Meyer, who replied by letter in June 1872 that he was unable to take up the offer. At the same time, a German Society formed and at their first annual dinner in June 1872, 50 people attended. In August 1872, tenders for the erection of the church were invited by its architect, Johaan Siegmund Martin Jacobsen (known as Isaac Jacobson). With Norwegian ancestry, Jacobson was born in Hamburg, Germany in 1823 and emigrated to Nelson in 1843. The successful tenderer was John Greig at £725. With other incidental expenses, the overall project cost was around £1000.

Jacobsen had designed a Gothic church that would hold about 230 people. The foundation stone was laid by the Superintendent of the Canterbury Province, William Rolleston, on 6 November 1872. As no German pastor had arrived yet, Rev. Croasdaile Bowen, a brother of Charles Bowen, conducted a service in German, with printed copies of it handed to the English-speaking guests. The event was attended by many Canterbury dignitaries; 400 people attended in total. A time capsule was placed under the foundation stone, containing the following parchment inscription:

Established and built by the German colonists of Canterbury, New Zealand, by voluntary contributions, by themselves and by their English fellow colonists, also by a liberal grant from the Provincial Government, for the object of having the Word of God preached in the German language. The foundation was laid by W. Rolleston, Esq., Superintendent, on the 6th November, 1872, under the reign of Queen Victoria of Great Britain and Ireland, and the Emperor Wilhelm the First of Germany; Sir G. F. Bowen, Governor of New Zealand; J. Jacobsen, architect; Greig, builder.

— The Press staff writer, 7 November 1872 edition

=== Church bells ===
On 26 September 1872, the church building committee sent a letter to the German Chancellor, Otto von Bismarck, requesting support with procuring three church bells. The German War Minister acceded to the request, offering the metal needed in the form of guns captured in the recent Franco-Prussian War, with the church committee covering the costs of casting and transport. Ruddenklau, who was in Germany at the time to find a suitable pastor, was asked to make all necessary arrangements. By June 1873, all funds had been raised, including those for the bells. The bells were cast by the Collier foundry in Berlin. The total weight of the bells was 18 long cwt 55.5 lb (2,072 lb or 940 kg). It was later stated that the bells weighed in fact 22 long cwt (2,500 lb or 1,100 kg). The largest of the bells had a relief of the German Emperor, and carried two inscriptions: "Wilhelm I., Kaiser von Deutschland" and "Für die Deutsch-evangelische Gemeinde, Christchurch, Canterbury, Neuseeland" (for the German protestant parish in Christchurch, Canterbury, New Zealand). The second bell had a relief of the crown prince with the following inscription: "Friedrich Wilhelm Kronprinz von Deutschland". The third bell had a relief of the German chancellor with the following inscription: "Fürst von Bismarck, Reichskanzler des Deutschen Reiches". It was initially hoped that Ruddenklau, the new pastor and the bells could come to New Zealand on the same ship, but Ruddenklau and Rev. L. Lohr arrived on the Rakaia in April 1874, The church committee obtained support for the transport of the bells, and the New Zealand Shipping Company carried them free of charge to Lyttelton, and the provincial government carried them by railway free of charge from Lyttelton to Christchurch.

With the pastor in place, the church could finally be opened. There was a further delay as books and harmonium did not arrive in time, and the opening was postponed until Ascension Day, which fell onto 14 May 1874. In the evening of the same day, a tea meeting was held at the Oddfellows' Hall, which almost 500 people attended.

Meanwhile, the three church bells arrived with the Apelles in early May 1874. It was realised that to accommodate the bells, an additional and stronger bell tower would have to be built. At the same meeting, it was decided to build a parsonage and in early July 1874, the church trustees called for tenders for the parsonage. At the end of September 1874, architect Jacobson called for tenders for the proposed bell tower. The bells were inaugurated on Christmas Eve of 1874, with the honour of ringing the bells falling to Sir John Cracroft Wilson (representing the Superintendent of Canterbury Province) and the Mayor of Christchurch, Fred Hobbs.

In early 1875, it was agreed to lease the bell tower to Christchurch City Council for 50 years, and have five more bells subscribed for that would become the property of the city council. A committee was put in place with five trustees nominated by Christchurch City Council, and three by the German church trustees. The bell tower was to be secular, but used on Sunday mornings to call for Divine service. This measure was intended to address the lack of a bell tower in central Christchurch; ChristChurch Cathedral's tower was not finished until November 1881. Councillor John Anderson, who was about to travel to Germany, was tasked with arranging for the purchase of the five additional bells. However, by 1879, no additional bells had been installed.

== Financial crisis and closure ==
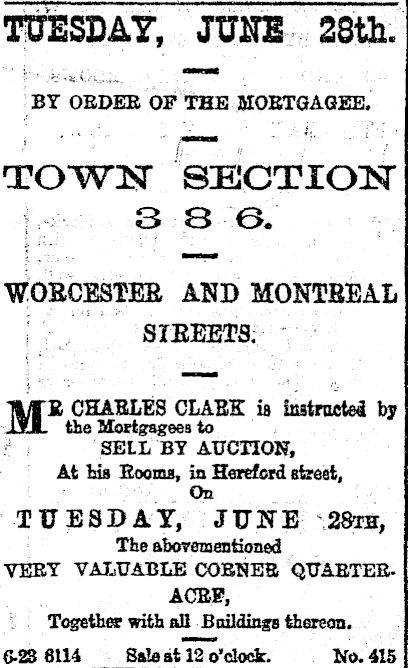
The 1881 auction advertisement fails to mention that it is the German Church that is on offer

The church faced difficult financial times. In March 1878, it was decided to terminate the pastor's contract within ten days. Lohr left Canterbury at the end of April on the Ellora bound for London. Attempts were made to let the church to another religious body and the Bible Christian Church made use of the building.

While in use by the Bible Christian Church, the Germans did not use their church. This changed a year later on 2 March 1879, when a new pastor commenced. Rev P. G. Jacobsen was a native of Schleswig-Holstein and met the desired criterion of having had colonial experience, as he had spent 14 years in Victoria, Australia. Jacobsen could preach in German, English, and Scandinavian languages, as during his youth and prior to the Second Schleswig War, Schleswig and Holstein had belonged to Denmark. The Bible Christians meanwhile moved to the nearby Templar Hall. There were debts from paying Lohr a retirement pension and once more, a fund-raising campaign was started. Later in 1879, the German Debating Society was formed and held its inaugural meeting at the parsonage.

Once a fortnight, Jacobsen held Scandinavian services on Sunday afternoons. In April 1880, this resulted in the Scandinavian Lutheran Church to formally amalgamate with the German Church. At the end of June 1881, the mortgagee put the land and all its buildings up for sale. In advertising the auction, it was not mentioned that the German Church was for sale, and the resulting bidding was by members of the congregation only. The sale netted £2210. The purchaser, solicitor John Joyce, on-sold the German Church in early 1882. At the subsequent meeting of church trustees in February 1882, the accounts provided by Jacobsen were not paid and it was resolved that the cash held by the trustees was invested instead. The importance of the matter was illustrated by the fact that, in a break with tradition, all notices advertising the meeting in the various papers had been placed in the German language. Later that year, the church was offered for lease for a term. The German Church was taken over by the Freethought Association and was renamed Freethought Hall.
