= Meshblock =

Small geographic unit

Mesh blocks or meshblocks are a small geographic unit used in the census of several countries.

== New Zealand ==
New Zealand's countrywide meshblock framework was first set up in 1976, although the term dates back to at least the 1916 census. The meshblock pattern is updated each year. It comprised 41,376 meshblocks at the 2006 census, increasing to 46,637 in 2013, 53,589 in 2018 and 57,539 in 2023.

Meshblocks are defined by Statistics New Zealand as being "the smallest geographic unit for which statistical data is collected and processed by Statistics New Zealand". It is a defined area, varying in size from part of a city block to large areas of rural land. Each of these borders another to form a network covering the whole country including inlets and coasts, and extending out to the 200 nautical miles (370 km; 230 mi) economic zone. Meshblocks are added together to "build up" larger geographic areas such as area units and urban areas. They are also used to draw up and define New Zealand electorates and local authority boundaries.

Several meshblocks are grouped together to form the next largest statistical area, SA1. SA1s usually have 100–200 residents, but remote rural areas and urban industrial or business areas may have fewer people and apartment blocks, retirement villages, prisons, boarding schools, etc) may have more than 500.

== Australia ==
In Australia mesh blocks were developed by the Australian Bureau of Statistics from 2006, and released in February 2008, although they were not fully implemented until 2011. The 2016 Australian Statistical Geography Standard contains 358,122 mesh blocks in Australia. They are intended to be the basic unit which comprise all other administrative boundaries that are defined by the ABS. Political administrative boundaries (local, state and federal), suburbs, postal, and cadastral are approximated by mesh block allocations. This is so that statistics can be easily made available for the many types of uses needed, such as non-standard areas like water catchments etc. Mesh blocks are about four or five times smaller than the previously used Census Collection Districts. Most of those in residential areas cover an area of around 30–60 dwellings, which is meant to be the smallest size data can be gathered so that people would not be able to be identified.

== See also ==
- Census tract
