= De Camp =

De Camp, or DeCamp, or Decamp is a surname. Notable people with the surname include:

- Vincent De Camp (1777–1839), British stage actor
- L. Sprague de Camp (1907–2000), American science fiction and fantasy writer
- Catherine Crook de Camp (1907–2000), American writer, wife of L. Sprague
- Caroline Middleton DeCamp (1926–2000), British politician
- John DeCamp (1941–2017), state senator and author
- Joseph DeCamp (1858–1923), American painter
- Rosemary DeCamp (1910–2001), American actress
- C. M. DeCamp, national champion college football player

== See also ==
- DeCamp, California, community in Mendocino County
- De Camp, Missouri, a ghost town
- DeCamp Bus Lines, bus company serving northern New Jersey
- Camp (surname)
