= Norman Creek =

Norman Creek may refer to:

- Norman Creek (footballer), an English footballer
- Norman Creek (Queensland), a stream in Queensland, Australia
- Norman Creek (Missouri), a stream in the Missouri, United States
