= De Camp, Missouri =

Extinct town in the American state of Missouri

Coordinates: 37°54′00″N 91°35′44″W

De Camp is an extinct town in eastern Phelps County, in the U.S. state of Missouri. The community was located on the Elliott Branch of Norman Creek, approximately three-quarters of one mile east of Missouri Route F and about six miles south of St. James.

== History ==
A post office called Decamp was established in 1905, and remained in operation until 1926. The community took its name from a nearby mine of the same name.
