= 1926 New Zealand census =

National census of New Zealand in 1926

Eighteenth census of the Dominion of New Zealand
- 20 April 1926; 99 years ago

General information
- Country: Dominion of New Zealand, Dominion of the British Empire
- Authority: Statistics New Zealand
- Website: stats.govt.nz (1926)

Results
- Total population: 1,408,140 (▲10.73)

The 1926 New Zealand census was the eighteenth national population census. The day used for the census was Tuesday, 20 April 1926. The total population of the Dominion of New Zealand was counted as 1,408,140, an increase of 136,473 people or 10.73% since the 1921 census.

The New Zealand and South Seas International Exhibition was held in Dunedin during a months-long period that included the census date. Due to its large visitor numbers (for example, on 1 May 1926, 84,000 visitors were counted at the exhibition), the results of the census were skewed.

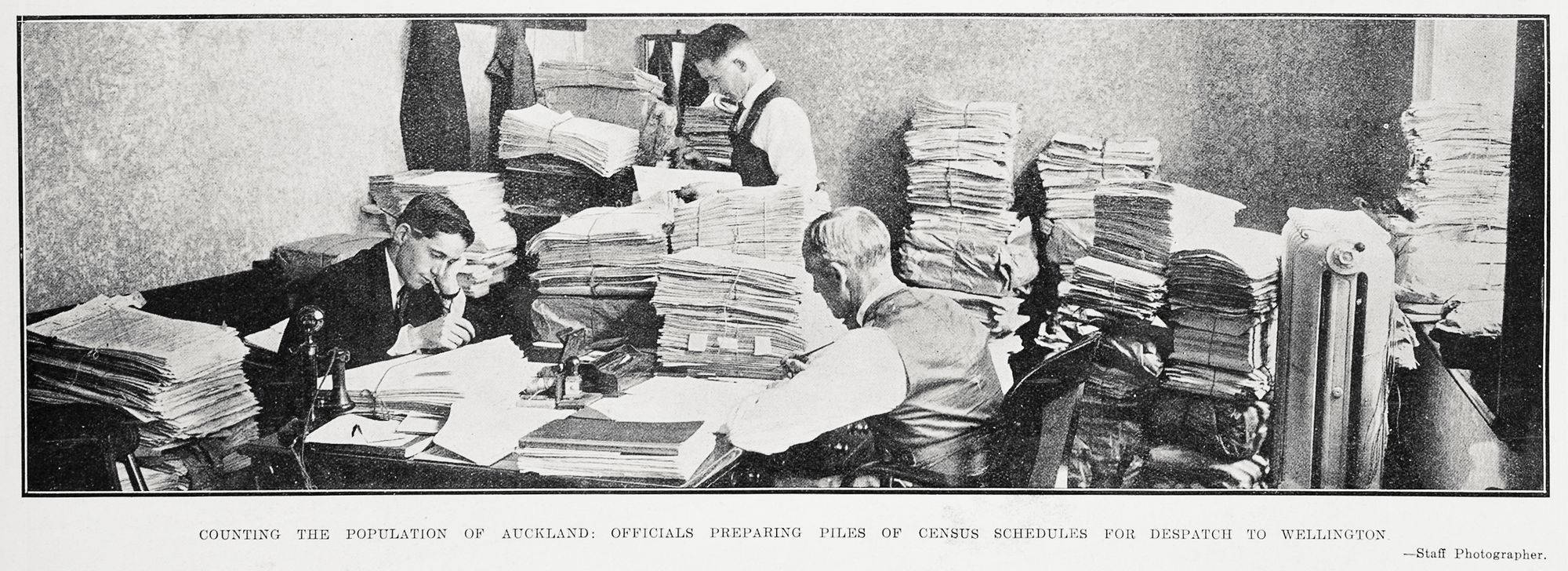
Officials in Auckland preparing census returns for dispatch to Wellington
