= 1878 New Zealand census =

National census of New Zealand in 1878

Eighth census of the Colony of New Zealand
- 3 March 1878; 148 years ago

General information
- Country: New Zealand

Results
- Total population: 414,412 (▲38.36%)
- Most populous provincial district: Otago (114,469)
- Least populous provincial district: Marlborough (7,557)

The 1878 New Zealand census was the first held in four years. The non-Māori population of New Zealand (including the Chatham Islands) was 414,412.

== Non-Māori population by province ==
Province	Population	Population increase or decrease	Largest town in province	Population of town
Auckland	82,661	+22.55%	Auckland	13,758
Taranaki	9,463	+73.16%	New Plymouth	2,680
Hawke's Bay	15,015	+62.71%	Napier	5,415
Wellington	51,069	+71.43%	Wellington	18,953
Nelson	25,128	+11.39%	Nelson	6,604
Marlborough	7,557	+22.98%	Blenheim	1,701
Canterbury	91,922	+56.40%	Christchurch	13,425
Westland	16,932	+13.94%	Hokitika	3,202
Otago	114,469	+34.49%	Dunedin	22,525
Chatham Islands	196	+51.94%		
Total	414,412	+38.36%		

== Birthplaces of the population ==
48% of the non-Māori population was born in the United Kingdom, and 42% was born in New Zealand. 73% of the 4,442 Chinese people in New Zealand lived in Otago. There were only 15 Chinese women in New Zealand, and overall there were more men from each country than women.

Where born	Number	Percent (%) of population
British possessions:		
New Zealand	174,126	42.02
Australian colonies	16,091	3.88
England	106,493	25.7
Wales	1,702	0.41
Scotland	47,949	11.57
Ireland	43,758	10.56
British North America	1,582	0.38
Other British possessions	1,972	0.48
Foreign Countries:		
France and French colonies	737	0.18
Germany	4,649	1.12
Denmark (including Greenland and Iceland)	2,225	0.54
Norway	1,213	0.29
Sweden	1,162	0.28
Other European countries	2,203	0.53
United States of America	714	0.17
China	4,442	1.07
Other countries	1,160	0.28
At Sea:		
British Subjects	1,248	0.3
Foreign Subjects	38	0.01
Unspecified:		
British names	686	0.16
Foreign names	26	0.01
Names not mentioned	236	0.06
Total	414,412	100

== Māori census ==
A census of Māori was also conducted in 1878. Officers in native district were asked to collect information about Māori in their areas on a prescribed form. Although people in some areas resisted attempts to have their details recorded, the Registrar-General believed that overall, the Māori census was more reliable than the preceding one in 1874.

Results showed a decline in the Māori population. Officials put this down to "love of drink, bad food, bad clothing, and bad houses, neglect of infants, prostitution of women when very young, dirt, and generally low social habits".

Epidemics had killed numbers of Māori in the previous few years. At Mongonui, there were 328 fewer people than at the previous census in May 1874, "attributable to the ravages of typhoid fever of a very fatal character, which visited the northern parts of the district during the end of 1874 and the early part of 1875. Natives entirely without medical aid soon succumb to epidemics, even of a far milder nature than typhoid fever. The fever was followed by measles, which also added considerably to the mortality amongst them".

At Hokianga, the census official reported: "Since 1874, when the last census was taken, this district has been visited by two epidemics — viz., measles in 1875, and whooping-cough during the past and present years —both of which have carried off a large number of infants, the former also being in a great number of cases fatal to the delicate youth of both sexes. Diseases of the chest, scrofulous sores, and low fever are also very prevalent, and have been the cause of many deaths", and at Pokeno, "whooping-cough and measles have caused many deaths amongst the Native children, many of whom would not have died if proper care had been taken". In the Bay of Islands district, Edward Williams reported:

No virulent disease or epidemic has prevailed to account for this decrease, nor are the Natives generally an unhealthy race of people; but their want of cleanliness, their careless mode of living, and reckless exposure of themselves to all weathers, are causes which, combined, render them an easy prey to disease, and when attacked they at once give up in despair. The only hope for the Native race is their being induced to adopt European habits and customs; to cultivate cleanliness, a better attention to clothing and diet, and providing for themselves and their children some more comfortable shelter from the elements than the miserable hovels which they now call houses, and in which, with but few exceptions, they are content to huddle together in the greatest state of discomfort.

In Pokeno, the census official thought that some illness was due to changes in Māori lifestyle and clothing: "Formerly they wore little or no clothes, and were from infancy inured to the weather; [...] Since taking to wear blankets and other warm clothing, they appear to have become more susceptible of cold; no doubt on account of the irregular way they clothe themselves, sometimes having sufficient, and at others having scarcely any".

Population figures were also affected by the mobility of the people. At Hokianga, the official recorded that a lot of young men and their families had left the district to go and work in the kauri forests being felled in Kaipara and Whangaroa, while another group had returned to Hokianga after many years living elsewhere.

In the Chatham Islands there were said to be 53 Māori, 49 Moriori and 18 "half-castes".

North Island: Principal Tribes	Total
Arawa	3,157
Muaupoko	109
Ngatiporou	4,373
Ngatikahungunu	5,172
Ngaiterangi	974
Ngapuhi	5,667
Ngatimaniapoto	1,390
Ngatimaru	1,598
Ngatiawa, W.C.	1,376
Ngatiawa, E.C.	781
Ngatiraukawa	1,638
Ngatiruanui	1,078
Ngatiwhatua	753
Rangitane	129
Rariwa	2,270
Taranaki	938
Urewera	684
Waikato	4,959
Whanau-a-Apanui	820
Whanganui	2,756
Whakatohea	524
Of various Tribes, at Auckland and Hauraki	169
Total	41,315

South Island	Total
Nelson	259
Westland	82
Canterbury	534
Otago	779
Ruapuke Island	27
Stewart Island	128
Total South Island	2,160
Chatham Islands	120
