= 1871 New Zealand census =

National census of New Zealand in 1871

Sixth census of the colony of New Zealand
- 27 February 1871; 155 years ago

General information
- Country: New Zealand

Results
- Total population: 256,393 (▲17.25%)
- Most populous district: Auckland (62,335)
- Least populous district: Taranaki (4,480)

The 1871 New Zealand census was New Zealand's sixth national census. The day used for the census was Monday, 27 February 1871. It was the first census held in New Zealand for which separate census reports were produced, rather than including population statistics in a general report of statistical information about agriculture, exports and so on.

The total population of the Colony of New Zealand was counted as 256,393 of whom 150,356 were males and 106,037 females – an increase of 37,725 people, 17.25% since the previous 1867 census. Only the European population was counted; no Māori census was held.

== Population ==
The distribution of this population through the principal divisions of the colony reflecting the provinces was as follows:

Provincial district	Males	Females	Total population	Population increase or decrease
Auckland	35,502	26,833	62,335	+29.00%
Taranaki	2,572	1,908	4,480	+2.77%
Hawke's Bay	3,596	2,463	6,059	+14.68%
Wellington	13,180	10,821	24,001	+9.34%
Nelson	14,257	8,244	22,501	−5.51%
Marlborough	3,235	2,000	5,235	+19.76%
Canterbury	25,781	21,020	46,801	+22.09%
Westland	10,453	4,904	15,357	−1.13%
Otago	36,771	23,951	60,722	+25.00%
Southland	4,920	3,849	8,769	+10.39%
Colony of New Zealand	150,356	106,037	256,393	▲17.25%
Source: Statistics New Zealand

Note: Includes Stewart Island and Chatham Islands males 89, females 44 (total 133).

=== Birthplace ===
The figures show that of the total population, only 36.46% were born in New Zealand. The majority of the resident population (63.54%) was born overseas, mostly in the United Kingdom.

Places of birth	Population	Percentage	Population increase or decrease
New Zealand	93,474	36.46%	+45.93%
Totals, overseas-born	162,912	63.54%	–
England	67,044	26.15%	+2.17%
Scotland	36,871	14.38%	+5.86%
(Republic of Ireland) Ireland	29,733	11.60%	+6.36%
Australian colonies	12,426	4.85%	–
Other British Dominions	4,062	1.58%	–
(German Empire) Germany	2,416	0.94%	−14.86%
Wales	1,345	0.52%	+1.97%
United States	1,249	0.49%	+2.96%
France	551	0.22%	−0.36%
Other Foreign Countries (Incl:China)	5,859	2.28%	–
At sea	823	0.32%	–
Not specified	540	0.21%	–
Total (non-Māori)	256,393	100.00%	▲
Source:SNZ

=== Religious denominations ===
Members of Christian denominations formed 94.51% of those who answered the question in the census. 5.49% of the population were members of non-Christian sects, and those who stated themselves as "otherwise described" numbered 2.38%. 3.36% objected to stating their religion at all.

Denomination	1871 census	
Denomination	Population	Percentage
Christian	239,542	94.51%
Church of England	102,389	39.93%
Presbyterians	63,624	24.82%
Roman; Catholics and Catholics undefined	35,608	13.89%
Wesleyan Methodist Church	19,971	7.79%
Baptists	4,732	1.84%
Congregational Independents	3,941	1.54%
Lutheran Church	2,341	0.91%
Primitive Methodists	1,883	1.73%
Society of Friends	201	0.08%
Protestants (No Particular Denomination Specified)	4,852	1.98%
Hebrews	1,262	0.50%
Otherwise described	6,097	2.38%
Not described	862	0.33%
Objecting to state	8,630	3.36%
New Zealand	256,393	100.00%

== See also ==
- New Zealand census
