= 1864 New Zealand census =

Fourth census of the Colony of New Zealand
- 1 December 1864; 161 years ago

General information
- Country: New Zealand

Results
- Total population: 172,158 (▲73.86%)
- Most populous provincial district: Otago (49,019)
- Least populous provincial district: Hawke's Bay (3,770)

The 1864 New Zealand census of people of European descent was held on 1 December 1864. The census contained questions about people's health, religion, occupation, education and literacy, and marital status. There were also questions about the size and construction materials of dwellings, land fenced and cultivated and livestock.

The census found showed that the population had increased by 73.86% since the previous census in 1861, and more people lived in the South Island than the North Island. The census showed that there were 23.82% more men than women in New Zealand (excluding the military and their families), increased from 1861 when there were 23.34% more men than women, and from 1858 when there were 13.36% more men. Enumerators attributed the increasing discrepancy to the large influx of miners to the gold fields, who were likely to be unmarried or to have left their families in their home countries.

== Population by province ==
The most populous province was Otago, with 49,019 people counted in the census. This total included about 10,000 miners.

Province	European population	Percent (%) increase since 1861
Auckland	42,132	72.53
Taranaki	4,374	113.99
Hawke's Bay	3,770	44.38
Wellington	14,987	19.26
Nelson	11,910	19.67
Marlborough	5,519	140.06
Canterbury	32,276	101.22
Otago	49,019	80.46
Southland (including Stewart Island)	8,085	330.97
Chatham Islands	86	72
Total excluding military	172,158	73.86
Military and families	11,973	
General total of Europeans	184,131	

== Birthplaces of the European population as of December 1864 ==
The percentage of the European population born in New Zealand decreased from 27.86% in 1861 to 23.95% in 1864, but the total population grew by 73.86% due to large-scale immigration.

Country	Number	Percent (%)
(United Kingdom) New Zealand-born	41,235	23.95
England	58,444	33.95
Scotland	30,940	17.98
Ireland	20,317	11.8
Wales	1.029	0.6
(Australia) Australian colonies	9,533	5.54
(United Kingdom) Other British dominions	3,109	1.8
United States of America	1,115	0.65
(German Confederation) Germany	1,999	1.16
France	505	0.29
Other foreign countries	2,189	1.27
At sea	601	0.35
Not specified	1,142	0.66
Total New Zealand	172,158	100.0

== Religious affiliation ==
Almost half of the European population belonged to the Church of England, but as occurs in modern censuses, some individuals stated other unusual religious beliefs, for example 'Bible Believer', 'Infidel', and 'Professor of Cosmo-theism".

Denomination	Population		Percent (%) of total population	
Denomination	1861	1864	1861	1864
Church of England	44,451	73,118	44.89	42.47
Church of Scotland, Free Church of Scotland, Presbyterians not more specifically described	21,207	42,058	21.41	24.43
Roman Catholic	10,870	21,507	10.98	12.49
Wesleyan Methodist	7,670	12,506	7.75	7.26
Congregational Independents	2,070	3,689	2.09	2.14
Baptists	1,958	3,391	1.98	1.97
Primitive Methodists	724	1,340	0.73	0.78
Lutherans	681	1,803	0.68	1.05
Hebrews	326	955	0.32	0.56
Society of Friends	70	128	0.07	0.08
Protestants (no particular denomination specified)	4,053	6,825	4.09	3.96
Otherwise described	1,284	2,220	1.30	1.29
Not described	3,657	2,618	3.69	1.52

== Occupations ==
Labourers, farm workers and domestic and general servants made up almost 18% of workers. Officials said that of 15,700 people on the Otago gold fields at census time, about 10,000 were male miners. Just over half of the population, mostly women and children, had no occupation. Those women who were employed mostly worked as domestic servants or at domestic duties, but small numbers were employed in trade and manufacture, agricultural and pastoral work, or as mechanics, artificers, and skilled workers. More than half of all teachers were women.

Occupations	Numbers	Percent (%) of population
Trade, Commerce, and Manufacturing	7,625	4.43
Agricultural and Pastoral	12,089	7.02
Mechanics, Artificers, and Skilled Workers	12,118	7.04
Mining	12,527	7.28
Professions, Clerical, Medical, and Legal	619	0.36
Teachers, Surveyors, and other Educated Professions	1,106	0.64
Labourers	12,639	7.34
Domestic and General Servants	6,202	3.6
Miscellaneous	13,951	8.11
No occupation stated (Principally women and children)	93,282	54.18
Total	172,158	100
