= 1881 New Zealand census =

Ninth census of the Colony of New Zealand
- 3 April 1881; 145 years ago

General information
- Country: New Zealand

Results
- Total population: 489,993 (▲18.22 %)
- Most populous provincial district: Otago (134,077)
- Least populous provincial district: Marlborough (9,300)

The 1881 New Zealand census was a population count taken in 1881. The non-Māori census was taken on 3 April 1881, and the Māori census took place the following day. The non-Māori population was 489,933, an 18.22% increase since the previous census in 1878. The Māori population was estimated to be 44,097. There were 4995 Chinese men and nine Chinese women in the country, with almost 3,500 of those living in Otago. Over 3800 of the Chinese in New Zealand worked on the gold fields.

As well as extensive population data, the census gathered information about fencing, farm equipment, livestock and poultry, and production of butter and cheese. The final results were submitted to parliament on 13 November 1882. Responding to comments about delays completing the census returns, the Registrar-General pointed out that an enormous amount of work was involved. It was difficult to find people to act as enumerators in sparsely populated areas; horses had to be hired; schedules had to be thoroughly checked before being sent to Wellington; and temporary clerks had to be hired and supervised.

== Non-Māori population ==
Provincial District	Population	Percent (%) change since 1878	Largest towns in Provincial Districts	Population
Auckland	99,451	+ 20.31%	Auckland	16,664
Taranaki	14,858	+ 57.01%	New Plymouth	3,310
Wellington	61,371	+ 20.17%	Wellington	20,563
Hawke's Bay	17,367	+ 15.66%	Napier	5,756
Marlborough	9,300	+ 33.06%	Blenheim	2,107
Nelson	26,075	+ 3.77%	Nelson	6,764
Westland	15,010	−11.35%	Hokitika	2,600
			Greymouth	2,544
Canterbury	112,182	+ 22.04%	Christchurch	15,213
Otago (as after reunion with Southland)	134,077	+ 17.13%	Dunedin	24,372
			Invercargill	4,596
Chatham Islands	242	+ 23.47%		
Total	489,933	+ 18.22%		

== Birthplaces of the population ==
Birthplace	Number	Percent (%) of population
British Possessions:		
New Zealand	223,404	45.6
Australian Colonies	17,277	3.53
England	119,224	24.33
Wales	1,963	0.4
Scotland	52,753	10.77
Ireland	49,363	10.08
British North America	1,722	0.35
Other British Possessions	2,292	0.47
Foreign Countries:		
France and French Colonies	848	0.17
Germany	4,819	0.98
Austria	513	0.1
Switzerland	332	0.07
Italy	483	0.1
Norway	1,271	0.26
Sweden	1,264	0.26
Denmark	2,199	0.45
Other European Countries	984	0.2
United States of America	841	0.17
China (including 39 non-Chinese)	5,033	1.03
Other Countries	1,190	0.24
At Sea:		
British Subjects	1,288	0.26
Foreign Subjects	37	0.01
Unspecified:	833	0.17
Total	489,933	100

== Māori census ==
The Māori population was estimated as 44,097, with 41,601 of those living in the North Island. Census enumerators faced difficulties getting some Māori to cooperate with completion of the census. Some people were said to suspect that the forms were a government trick to take their land, or part of a plan to kill them. The nomadic nature of the people also caused some enumeration difficulties, and in some cases estimates had to be made. Although population numbers had gone up since the previous census, officers in many districts noted a general decrease in the number of Māori. This discrepancy was attributed to better enumeration. In particular, there was a continuing drop in the number of children being born. This was attributed to introduced diseases and vices such as smoking and drinking, as well as inadequate clothing. Another observation was that since the end of inter-tribal warfare, Māori had shifted their settlements from easy-to-defend hilltops, which had good sun and airflow, to swampy, damp areas. Officers noted that in more remote areas where there was less European influence, there were more healthy children, and also that Māori in European-dominated areas who had jobs and lived in European-style houses tended to be healthier.

North Island: Principal Tribes	Population
Arawa	3,938
Muaupoko	81
Ngatiporou	4,381
Ngatikahungunu	4,730
Ngaiterangi	996
Ngapuhi	5,564
Ngatimaniapoto	1,528
Ngatimaru	1,349
Ngatiawa	1,869
Ngatiraukawa	1,443
Ngatiruanui	769
Ngatiwhatua	487
Rangitane	89
Rarawa	2,775
Taranaki	460
Urewera	1,850
Waikato	5,233
Whanau-a-Apanui	748
Whanganui	2,560
Whakatohea	625
Various Tribes at Auckland and Thames	126
North Island Total	41,601
South Island (by residence)	
Marlborough	357
Nelson	203
Westland	63
Canterbury	601
Otago, Ruapuke, and Stewart Island	837
South Island Total	2,061
Chatham Islands (Māori and Moriori)	125
Māori Prisoners from North Island in Hokitika, Lyttelton, and Dunedin Gaols	310
Grand total	44,097
