= 1858 New Zealand census =

National census of New Zealand in 1858

Second census of the Colony of New Zealand
- 24 December 1858; 167 years ago

General information
- Country: New Zealand

Results
- Total population: 59,303 (▲121.8%)
- Most populous provincial district: Auckland (18,177)
- Least populous provincial district: Hawke's Bay (1,514)

The 1858 New Zealand census was the second national population census held in the self-governing colony of New Zealand. The date used for the census was on 24 December 1858 and the first census after the passing of the 1858 Census Act, which stated that a census of Europeans (but not Māori) was to be held every three years. Enumerators delivered forms to households during December, then collected them on 26 December or as soon as possible after that date. The European population of New Zealand more than doubled during the seven years between the 1851 and 1858 censuses. The census asked questions about the "social and domestic condition" of the population: place of birth, years in the colony, marital status, religion, occupation, and so on. There were also questions about education and literacy, and questions about how much land was cultivated or fenced, crops and livestock. Information was also gathered about public amenities such as churches, hospitals, banks and businesses.

A separate census of Māori was taken between September 1857 and September 1858, which gave an estimated population of 55,000 to 56,000 Māori people, mostly living in the North Island.

== Population by province ==
Province	Population	Population change since 1851
Auckland	18,177	+92.7%
New Plymouth	2,650	+73.1%
Hawke's Bay	1,514	(included with Wellington in 1851)
Wellington	11,728	+101.6%
Nelson	9,272	+116.2%
Canterbury	8,967	+173.9%
Otago	6,944	+290.9%
Stewart Island	51	(not given in 1851)
Total excluding military	59,303	+121.8%
Military and families	1896	
General total of Europeans	61,199	

== Birthplaces of the European population as of December 1858 ==
In 1858 just under a third of Europeans in New Zealand were born there. In New Plymouth Province, 40% of Europeans were New Zealand-born, but this fell to 21.6% in Canterbury. Across the country, an average of 40% of residents were born in England, but in Otago Province only 19.3% were English, and 50.4% were born in Scotland.

Country of birth	Percent (%)
NZ	31.49
England	39.94
Scotland	13.45
Ireland	7.68
Wales	0.39
Australia	2.37
UK Other British dominions	2.09
United States of America	0.52
Germany	0.78
France	0.29
Other foreign countries, at sea, not specified	1.00
Total New Zealand	100.0

== Religious affiliation ==
Just over half of those who stated their religion said they belonged to the Church of England, but in Canterbury Province this rose to 72.8%. Although an average of 19% of people nationwide followed the Church of Scotland or other Presbyterian church, 65.7% of the population in Otago Province was Presbyterian, reflecting the Scottish origins of many settlers there. 20% of the European population in New Plymouth Province was Wesleyan, double the national average of 9.09%. Almost 22% of Aucklanders were Catholic, compared to the national average of 11.11%.

Denomination	Percent(%)
Church of England	51.4
Church of Scotland, Free Church of Scotland, & other Presbyterians	19.4
Roman Catholic Church	11.11
Wesleyan Methodists	9.09
Congregational Independents	2.16
Baptists	2.12
Primitive Methodists	0.95
Lutherans	0.7
Hebrews	0.32
Society of Friends	0.12
Other denominations, or not stated	2.63
