= Roger Camp =

American photographer

Roger Camp is a photographer, poet and educator. Initially self-taught, he began photographing in earnest on a transcontinental bicycle trip he planned and executed at age 15 (1961). Accompanied by his twin brother, Roderic Ai Camp, the political scientist, they rode from Orange, California to Dayton, Ohio and the following year to Victoria, B.C., Canada. The trips are chronicled in a two-part article in The American Geographical Society's Focus (Fall & Winter, 1990).

== Biography ==
Roger Camp is a graduate of the University of California, Santa Barbara with a bachelor's degree in English (1967) and a master's degree in English (1969) from the University of Texas, Austin. He also holds a masters and master's of fine arts degree (1973,1974) from the University of Iowa in photography.

He started teaching English at Eastern Illinois University (1969) followed by a dual teaching position in English/Photography at the Columbus College of Art & Design (1974). Camp taught American students at the Cite Universitaire de Paris (1990) and directed the photography program at Golden West College, Huntington Beach, CA (1977).

Camp served as a book reviewer for Library Journal (1981) and a contract photographer for Black Star, New York (1990).

Camp was a Danforth Fellow in Black Studies (1969), a Visual Fellow at the Fine Arts Work Center, Provincetown (1982), held a summer seminar Fulbright to Brazil (1988) and is the recipient of the Leica Medal of Excellence in Photojournalism 1987. He was twice awarded the NISOD Excellence Award, 1989, 1990, the National Institute for Staff and Organizational Development, University of Texas, Austin, for innovation in teaching and learning. In 1992 The City of Huntington Beach, California awarded him the Outstanding Artist of the Year Award for service to the community.

Upon his retirement from teaching in 2010 he began writing poetry full time. His work has appeared in numerous journals including The North American Review, Southern Poetry Review, Poetry East and Nimrod International Journal Award 40.

== Publications ==
Camp is the author of three books.

Butterflies in Flight, Thames & Hudson, released in 2002 (selected by American Photo, The Associated Press, NBC Today Show in their recommended photo books of the year). It was award a "Benny" The International Printing Industry's highest award in book design ("the book must be flawless").

500 Flowers, Dewi Lewis Media, released in 2005.

Roger Camp: Heat, Charta/DAP, released in 2008.

"Ascension,"Nimrod International Journal, Fall, 2018.

"To the nurse who spoke the language of the heart," Poetry East, Fall 2017.

"The breeze in the high branches sings," Natural Bridge A Journal of Contemporary Literature, Fall 2017.

"Baby on a Train," Southern Poetry Review, 2016.

"Bonfire of the Valentines," Gargoyle, 2016.

"Photographing in Amazonia," Spillway, Summer 2015.

"The green machine is now your mother," Atlanta Review, Fall 2012.

"My wife, the raven," North American Review Spring 2010.

"Index of American Periodical Verse 1979," Sander Zulauf, Scarecrow Press 1980

An Index to American Photographic Collections, George Eastman House, 1982

MacMillan Biographical Encyclopedia of Photographic Artists & Innovators, Macmillan, 1983

''Security Pacific Collection 1970-1985: Selected Works," Security Pacific Corp.,1985

"At the Galleries," Robert McDonald, Los Angeles Times, August, 1987)

"At the Galleries," Leah Ollman, Los Angeles Times, (July, 1987)

"At the Galleries," Robert Pincus, Los Angeles Times, (May 1983)

"At the Galleries," Suzanne Muchnic, Los Angeles Times, (May, 1980)

"At the Galleries," Robert McDonald, Los Angeles Times, (January, 1987)

"A Sense of Wonder: The Photography of Roger Camp," Darkroom Photography, (September, 1987)

"Work of Two Artists Contrasts Pier Life," Los Angeles Times, (November, 1987)

"Three Shows of Subtleties, Icon and Fauna," William Zimmer, The New York Times (December, 1999)

Swimmers: Seventy International Photographers, Aperture, 1988

Graphis Alternative Photography, Graphis, 1995

"World Press Photo 1995,"Thames & Hudson, New York & London, 1995

Shoreline: The Camera at the Water's Edge, Graphis, 1996

Flora: A Contemporary Collection of Flora Photography, Graphis, 2002

"Summertime," Chronicle Books, San Francisco, 2014

Selected Exhibitions

Roger Camp: On the Beach: Views from the Huntington Beach Pier, Concourse Gallery, World Headquarters, Bank of America, San Francisco, CA, July 3 - August 26, 1986

On the Beach, World Headquarters, Hewlett-Packard, San Francisco, CA, January 12 - March 13, 1987

American Color, National Traveling Exhibition, Art Gallery, New Mexico State University, Las Cruces, NM, March 26 - April 17, 1987

American Color, National Traveling Exhibition, Art Gallery, New Mexico State University, Las Cruces, NM, March 26 - April 17, 1987

New Developments, Center of Photography at Woodstock, NY, September 12 - October 12, 1987

American Color, Art Gallery, Cleveland State University, OH, February 12 - March 12, 1988

At the Water’s Edge: American Beach Photography, Tampa Museum of Art, Tampa, FL, December 3 - February 11, 1990

On the Beach, University Art Gallery, University of Alaska, Anchorage, January 16 - February 2, 1990

Ocean View, California Museum of Photography, Riverside, CA, June 14 - August 17, 1997

Fauna III, Candace Perich Gallery, Katonah, NY, December 4 - January 12, 2000

Assignment America, Kodak Times Square Gallery, New York, NY February 13 - March 13, 2004

Summertime, Robin Rice Gallery, New York, NY, July 14 - September 5, 2010

Lost in Time: Selections from the Peckenpaugh Collection, California State University, Long Beach, Art Museum, June 13-July 19, 2016

Prints in Collections

Albin O. Kuhn Library, Special Collections, University of Maryland, Baltimore Bloomingdales, New York, NY California Museum of Photography, Riverside, CA California State University, Long Beach, University Art Museum Center for Photography Woodstock, Woodstock, NY Center of Creative Photography, Tucson, AZ Coca Cola Inc., Atlanta, GA IBMCorporation, New York & Boston Johnson & Johnson, San Diego, CA Lucent Technologies, Denver, CO Mayo Clinic, Rochester, MN United Nations, Geneva United States Diplomatic Missions abroad, twelve permanent U.S. Embassy collections University of California, Santa Barbara, Library, Special Research Collections University of Florida, Gainesville, FL
