= 1851 New Zealand census =

First national population census

First census of the Colony of New Zealand
1 November 1851; 173 years ago	1858 →
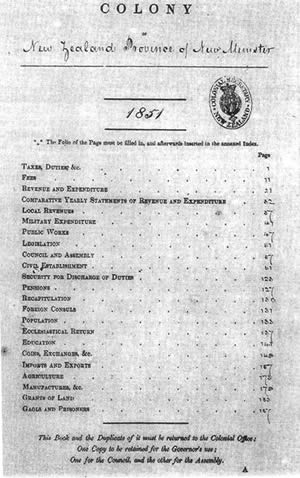
- 1851 census "Blue Book" statistics for "New Munster" (South Island).

General information
- Country: Crown colony of New Zealand

Results
- Total population: 26,707
- Most populous district: Auckland (9,430)
- Least populous district: New Plymouth (1,532)

The 1851 colony of New Zealand census was the first national population census held in the Crown colony of New Zealand. The day used for the census was Saturday 1 November 1851. The enumeration was left to the governments of New Ulster and New Munster, the two provinces into which the country was then divided and was ordered by the Census Ordinance of 1851. The census, which only surveyed European New Zealanders, revealed a population of 26,707.

== Summary ==
General census of 1851

- December 1851. (Reports appeared in Auckland Provincial Government Gazettes, 1853 and 1854.)

=== Data availability ===
The Blue Books were statistical information from New Zealand's early Colonial period (1840–1855). They have information about population, revenue, military, trade, shipping, public works, legislation, civil servants, foreign consuls, land transactions, churches, schools, and prisons.

== Population and dwellings ==
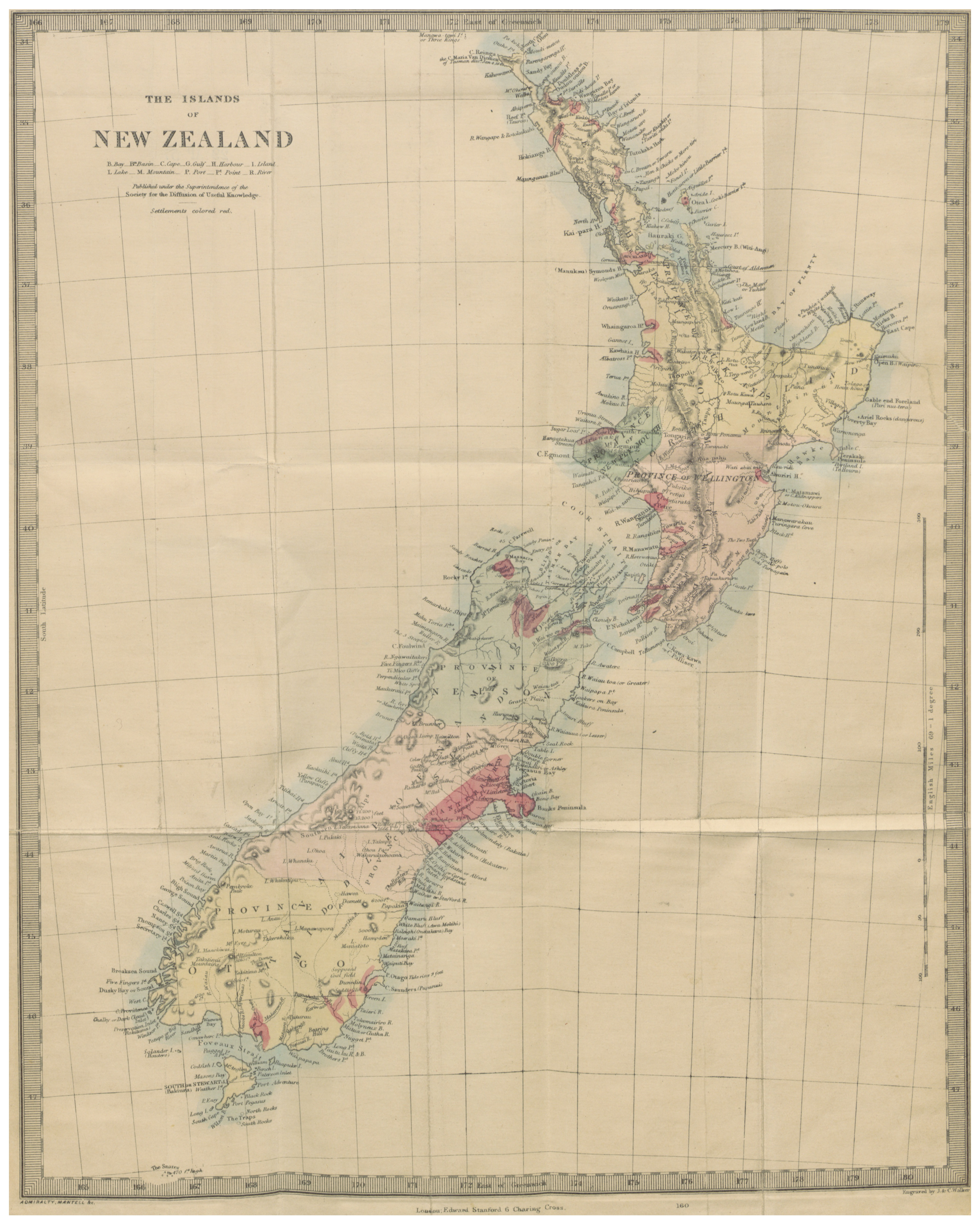
Map of New Zealand settlements (1857)

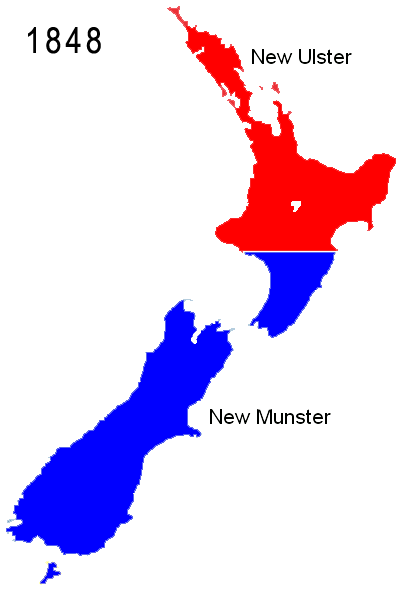
New Ulster & New Munster (1848 onwards).

Population counts for the New Zealand districts. The original six were Auckland, New Plymouth, Wellington, Nelson, Canterbury, and Otago, though in 1858 New Plymouth was renamed Taranaki.

=== Birthplace ===
Population of New Zealand colony in 1851.

Birthplace		Population	Percentage
(United Kingdom)	New Zealand	-	12.3
Totals, Overseas-born		-	87.7
(England)	England	13,485	50.5
(Scotland)	Scotland	–	12.7
(United Kingdom)	Ireland	–	16.5
(Wales)	Wales	–	0.4
Totals, British Isles		–	84.4
Other		–	3.3
Colony of New Zealand		26,707	100.0

=== Religion ===
Members of Christian denominations formed 93.35 per cent. of those who made answer to the inquiry at the census; non-Christian sects were 0.24 per cent.; whilst "other" religions constituted 6.41 per cent.

Denomination	1851 Census	
Denomination	Number	Percent (%)
Christian	24,930	93.35
Church of England	14,179	53.09
Presbyterians	4,124	15.44
Methodists	2,755	10.31
Baptist	400	1.50
Totals, Protestants	21,458	80.34
Roman; Catholic	3,472	13.00
Jews	65	0.24
Other specified religions	1,712	6.41
Totals, New Zealand	26,707	100.0

== Numbers of livestock ==
Showing the numbers of livestock in the possession of Europeans in the several settlements in 1851.

Settlement	Horses	Mules and Asses	Horned Cattle	Sheep	Goats	Pigs
Auckland	1,035	11	10,943	11,075	2,604	5,679
New Plymouth	68	-	1,395	2,700	83	1,165
Wellington (incl Hawkes Bay)	788	28	11,407	64,009	2,654	3,135
Nelson	532	13	5,838	92,014	5,842	2,609
Canterbury	224	7	2,043	28,416	356	1,255
Otago	243	1	3,161	34,829	582	2,371
Totals	2,890	60	34,787	233,043	12,121	16,214
