= 1874 New Zealand census =

National census of New Zealand in 1874

Seventh census of the Colony of New Zealand
- 1 March 1874; 152 years ago

General information
- Country: New Zealand

Results
- Total population: 299,514 (▲16.82%)
- Most populous provincial district: Auckland (67,451)
- Least populous provincial district: Taranaki (5,465)

The 1874 New Zealand census was a population count taken in 1874. The population of New Zealand was 299,514, not including Māori. Census papers were delivered to households during February 1874, to be completed for the night of 1 March 1874. The census asked questions about people's age, sex, marital status, religion, place of birth, health and education. Additional questions were asked about land use and ownership and about farm animals and equipment.

A separate census of Māori was held around the same time, and the Māori population was estimated to be around 46,000, of whom 43,538 lived in the North Island. This included part-Māori people living as Māori.

The number of Chinese living in New Zealand was shown to have almost doubled from the previous census in 1871, from 2640 to 4816. Over 4000 of these worked on the gold fields as miners, sluicers or water-race cutters. Only two Chinese women were said to be living in the country: one in Otago and one in the Chatham Islands.

== Population by province ==
Province	Population	Population change since 1871	Biggest town in province	Population
Auckland	67,451	+8.21%	Auckland	12,775
Taranaki	5,465	+21.99%	New Plymouth	2,044
Hawke's Bay	9,228	+52.30%	Napier	3,514
Wellington	29,790	+24.12%	Wellington	10,547
Nelson	22,558	+0.25%	Nelson	5,662
Marlborough	6,145	+17.38%	Blenheim	935
Canterbury	58,775	+25.58%	Christchurch	10,294
Westland	14,860	-3.24%	Hokitika	3,352
Otago	85,113	+22.48%	Dunedin	18,499

== Birthplaces ==
The Registrar-General stated that 95% of the non-Māori population had British "allegiance". This was calculated by counting those with a British birthplace, British subjects born in foreign countries, foreign people naturalised in New Zealand, people with British names who had been born at sea, and people with no stated birthplace but a British name. In all, residents of New Zealand in 1874 came from 75 countries including Persia, the Barbary Coast, Greenland and New Guinea.

Birthplace	Number	Percent (%) of population
New Zealand	122,635	40.94
Australian Colonies	13,601	4.54
England	74,628	24.92
Wales	1,381	0.46
Scotland	38,431	12.83
Ireland	30,255	10.1
Other British Possessions	3,058	1.02
France and French Colonies	569	0.19
Germany	2,819	0.94
Other European Countries	4,396	1.47
United States of America	575	0.19
China	4,828	1.61
Other Countries	893	0.3
At Sea	1445	0.49
Total	299,514	100

== Māori population ==
The census of Māori people was conducted differently to the general census. Instead of delivering papers to each household and later collecting them, officers enquired about the population from reliable local Māori. The reasoning was that Māori had always been used to transmitting their history and pedigrees orally, so more accurate results would be obtained than by means of printed forms.

In each district enumerated, the number of male and female Māori over and under 15 was listed by tribe, hapū and locality. There were more males than females in every district except Raglan and Kawhia. The biggest difference was in Kaipara, where there were 20% more males than females. In some cases the enumerators had to estimate numbers, for example in Hawkes Bay south of the Tangio River, where the enumerator listed 71 hapū with a guess at the total population there. In the upper Wanganui River area, about 250 people were noted to be temporarily absent at Waikato and Waitara. The total Māori population was estimated to be 46,016 people.

North Island districts	Males	Females	Total
Mangonui	1,129	942	2,071
Hokianga	1,548	1,248	2,796
Bay of Islands	1,548	1,291	2,839
Whangarei	294	217	511
Kaipara	789	524	1,313
Auckland	114	81	195
Waiuku	113	103	216
Wairoa and Waiheke	44	37	81
Lower Waikato	211	172	383
Upper Waikato (estimated population)	2407	1,987	4,394
Raglan and Kawhia	1,050	1,113	2,163
Hauraki	947	717	1,664
Tauranga	662	583	1,245
Maketu	1,546	1,399	2,945
Opotiki	1,042	906	1,948
Urewera	348	336	684
Waiapu	1,345	1,108	2,453
Turanga	788	602	1,390
Wairoa, Hawke's Bay	1,889	1,592	3,481
Hawke's Bay (south of Tangio River)	970	900	1,870
Taupo	442	408	850
Wairarapa	417	325	742
Taranaki	1,561	1,200	2,761
Wanganui	556	454	1,010
Upper Wanganui River	1,117	888	2,005
Rangitikei	312	272	584
Otaki and Porirua	360	293	653
Wellington	90	71	161
Total North Island inc half-castes	23,639	19,769	43,408

South Island districts	Males	Females	Total
Marlborough	252	200	452
Nelson	243	197	440
Westland	55	41	96
Canterbury	300	258	558
Otago, Stewart Island and Ruapuke Island	567	495	1,062
Total South Island inc half-castes	1,417	1,191	2,608
