= 1911 New Zealand census =

National census of New Zealand in 1911

Fifteenth census of the Dominion of New Zealand
- 2 April 1911; 114 years ago

General information
- Country: New Zealand
- Authority: Statistics New Zealand
- Website: stats.govt.nz (1911)

Results
- Total population: 1,058,313 (▲13.03%)
- Most populous district: Auckland (264,520)
- Least populous district: Westland (15,714)

The 1911 New Zealand census was New Zealand's fifteenth national census. The day used for the census was Sunday, 2 April 1911.

The total population of the Dominion of New Zealand was counted as 1,058,313 – an overall increase of 122,004 people or 13.03% over the 1906 census figure. The Māori census counted a total of 49,844, of whom 26,475 were males and 23,369 females, another 2,877 in the general census which made up 5 percent of the total night population. The total enumerated in the European (general) census was 1,008,468 of whom 531,910 were Males and 476,558 Females. The Māori census was held in March, while the general census was held in April.

The Census and Statistics Act 1910 created the Office of the Government Statistician within the Registrar General's Office. The Act (as in the 1911 census report) reiterated the penalties for those who refuse to fill out their census schedules and collectors who disclose the content of individual census schedules.

== Population and dwellings ==
The principal natural divisions in New Zealand are the North, South, and Stewart Islands. The "Distribution of European populations" of the various provincial districts are as follows:

Region	Males	Females	Total population
Auckland	141,700	122,820	264,520
Taranaki	27,785	23,784	51,560
Hawke's Bay	25,769	22,777	48,546
Wellington	104,945	94,149	199,094
Totals, North Island	300,199	263,530	563,729
Marlborough	8,745	7,240	15,985
Nelson	26,958	21,505	48,463
Westland	8,719	6,995	15,714
Canterbury	88,391	84,794	173,185
Otago
Otago portion	66,995	65,407	132,402
Southland portion	31,735	36,993	58,728
Totals, South Island	231,323	212,797	444,120
Stewart Island	220	137	357
Chatham Islands	166	92	258
Kermadec Islands	2	2	4
Dominion of New Zealand	531,910	476,558	1,008,468
Source: Total (including Chinese and "Half-castes")

The Maori population of the Dominion (not included above), according to the result of a separate census taken in April 1911, amounted to 49,844. Of these, 46,632 persons were found to be in the North Island, 2,681 persons in the South Island, 63 at Stewart Island, and 219 Maoris [sic] and Morioris [sic] at the Chatham Islands. There were 249 Maori wives of European husbands enumerated in the European census.

The total population of the Dominion (including Maoris and residents of the Cook and other Pacific Islands) in April 1911, was: Persons, 1,070,910; males, 564,834; females, 506,076; of these, 2,630 were Chinese—2,542 males, 88 females. The population of the Cook and other Pacific Islands now included within the boundaries of the Dominion was 12,598 persons, of whom 180 were whites or half-castes living as whites. There were also 513 Natives of these islands absent on ships or at the guano islands.

=== Māori census ===
The census of the Māori population—that is, full-blooded Maoris, with all half-castes living as members of Native tribes—was taken under the supervision of the officers of the Native Department in April 1911.

Area	Males	Females	Population
North Island	24,935	21,697	46,632
Middle Island	1,886	1,295	2,681
Stewart Island	42	21	63
Chatham Islands
Māori	105	99	204
Moriori	7	8	15
Māori wives living with European husbands	-	249	249
Totals, New Zealand	26,475	23,369	49,844

Notes: (excludes half-Māori counted in the separate European census) The pure-blood Moriori are practically extinct, and those now claiming to be Morioris are half-caste Moriori-Maoris.

Besides the half-castes (living as Members of Maori Tribes) included in the above table, there were 2,877 half-castes (males, 1,475; females, 1,402) living with and enumerated as Europeans in the other census.

== Birthplace ==
The figures show that of the total population of specified birthplace had New Zealand-born at 69.69% and 30.26% were born-overseas.

Birthplace	Population	Percent (%)	% difference
New Zealand	702,779	69.69	▲15.92
Total overseas-born	305,689	30.31	–
England	133,811	13.28	▲14.80
Scotland	51,709	5.13	▲8.25
(Republic of Ireland) Ireland	40,958	4.06	▼-3.53
Wales	2,206	0.22	▲2.89
Australia, Tasmania, and Fiji	50,693	5.03	–
(United Kingdom) Other British Possessions	4,570	0.46	–
Total British	986,726	97.84	–
(German Empire) Germany	4,015	0.40	▼-3.80
Denmark and Possessions	2,262	0.22	▼−0.65
Other European countries	55	0.00	▲19.56
United States of America	1,400	0.13	▲21.10
China	2,611	0.25	▲0.34
At sea	1,392	0.14	▲11.80
Birthplaces not stated	779	0.07	▲65.04
Total for specified birthplaces	1,007,689	99.92	▲13.46
New Zealand	1,008,468	100.00	▲13.49

== Religious denominations ==
Christians accounted for 95% of the population. Other religions accounted for 1.16%, people with no denomination were counted at 0.9% and people having no religion accounted 0.55%. People who did not state their religion accounted for 3.59% of the population.

Further categorisation of religions
Religion	Persons	Males	Females	%
Episcopalians				
– Church of England, and Episcopalians not otherwise defined	411,671	216,612	195,059	40.93
– Protestants (undefined)	2,171	1,332	839	0.22
Presbyterians	234,662	122,307	112,355	23.34
Methodists				
– Methodist Church of Australasia	63,959	31,419	32,540	6.36
– Primitive Methodists	27,445	13,802	13,643	2.74
– Methodists (undefined)	3,209	1,645	1,564	0.32
– Others	214	123	91	0.02
Baptists	20,042	9,599	10,443	2.00
Congregationalists	8,756	4,231	4,525	0.88
Lutherans (German Protestants)	4,477	2,818	1,659	0.44
Unitarians	1,316	707	609	0.13
Society of Friends	412	246	166	0.04
Church of Christ (Christians, Christian Disciples, Disciples of Christ, Disciples)	9,187	4,234	4,953	0.92
Brethren (Christian Brethren, Exclusive Brethren, Open Brethren, Plymouth Brethren)	7,865	3,609	4,256	0.78
Believers in Christ	37	16	21	
Evangelists (Evangelical Union, Evangelical Church, Evangelical Christians, Evangelical Brethren)	25	21	4	
Nonconformists	57	41	16	
Salvation Army	9,707	4,681	5,026	0.96
Christadelphians	1,028	486	542	0.10
Swedenborgians (New Church, New Jerusalem Church)	160	81	79	0.01
Seventh-day Adventists	1,113	457	656	0.11
Students of Truth	6	2	4	
Dissenters	5	3	2	
Christian Israelites, Israelites	19	12	7	
Other Christians	922	466	456	0.08
Catholics				
– Roman Catholics	139,191	72,419	66,722	13.84
– Catholics (undefined)	1,332	759	573	0.13
– Greek Church	265	178	87	0.03
– Catholic Apostolic	336	157	179	0.03
Other sects				
– Hebrews (Jews)	2,128	1,130	998	0.21
– Mormons (Latter-day Saints)	365	212	153	0.63
– Spiritualists	1,197	593	604	0.11
– Buddhists, Confucians, etc	1,501	1,481	20	0.15
– Others	661	352	309	0.06
No denomination				
– Freethinkers	4,238	3,417	821	0.42
– Agnostics	618	511	107	0.06
– Deists, Theists	32	24	8	
– No denomination	4,241	2,691	1,550	0.42
– Doubtful	48	32	16	
No religion				
– No religion	5,414	4,004	1,410	0.54
– Atheists	111	99	12	0.01
– Secularists	4	4		
– Object to state	35,905	23,310	12,595	3.58
– Unspecified	2,416	1,587	829	
Total for New Zealand	1,008,468	531,910	476,558	100.0

== See also ==
- New Zealand census
- 1916 New Zealand census
- 1911 Australian census
