= Wofford Benjamin Camp =

American agronomist

Wofford Benjamin "Bill" Camp (1894–1986) was a USDA agronomist who played an instrumental role in the development of corporate farming, particularly of cotton, in California.

Camp was born in Cherokee County, South Carolina in 1894 and attended Clemson University, where he earned a degree in agronomy in 1916. He took a job with the USDA Cotton Breeding Office and was transferred to California in 1917 to develop a long-staple cotton supply for the covering required by military aircraft during World War I. Camp became famous for developing the California cotton industry during and after the war. In 1958, Camp was awarded an honorary Doctor of Laws (LL.D.) degree from Whittier College.

== California Cotton ==
=== World War I ===
Soon after arriving at the USDA station at Shafter in Kern County, California, Camp began to experiment with 96 different varieties from different sources worldwide. He determined that Egyptian Pima cotton was the superior option and quickly developed widespread production, managing to generate successful crops within the year in 1917 and again in 1918. When the war came to a close and removed the need for long-staple cotton for military aircraft, Camp succeeded in expanding the cotton industry in California under USDA auspices rather than scaling it back.

=== Postwar era ===
Soon after the end of the war, Camp switched California cotton cultivation to the Acala #8 variety and pushed for the mechanization of cotton ginning. He used USDA money to bring James S. Townsend to California to adapt the cotton gin to the fine lint of Acala #8. In 1924, he successfully pressed for a "one variety" law prohibiting the growth of other varieties of cotton in California's cotton-growing counties. This development ensured that the Acala #8 plants would not be contaminated with other varieties and that the Shafter station (the originator of the variety) would remain dominant in the California cotton industry.

=== Great Depression ===
Having briefly left the USDA to work for the Bank of Italy in 1928, Camp returned in 1933 to oversee the cotton program in the Agricultural Adjustment Administration, part of the New Deal. He encouraged the move away from fruit farming toward cotton across California and helped funnel federal aid to cotton growers (especially large growers).

=== Private grower ===
In 1936, Camp permanently left the USDA and founded W. B. Camp & Son in Kern County, a diversified farming operation. Camp died in 1986 in Bakersfield, California.
