= 1886 New Zealand census =

Tenth census of the Colony of New Zealand
- 28 March 1886; 140 years ago

General information
- Country: New Zealand

Results
- Total population: 578,482 (▲18.07 %)
- Most populous provincial district: Otago (149,154)
- Least populous provincial district: Marlborough (11,113)

The 1886 New Zealand census was a population census of the non-Māori population taken on 28 March 1886, a census of Māori having taken place during February and March 1886. The non-Māori population was 578,482, an 18.07% increase since the previous census in 1881. The Māori population was estimated to be 41,969, including 2254 part-Māori living in tribes. Another 1,958 part-Māori were living as Europeans and counted in the main census.

== The process ==
The country was divided into enumerators' districts by the government. The enumerators divided their assigned districts into sub-districts, which had to be approved by the registrar-general, and then chose sub-enumerators who handed out and collected census forms from households. Forms were sent to the central office where up to 32 clerks in crowded offices sorted the forms and extracted, counted, recounted and calculated the numbers. 639 occupations had been identified from the previous census, but clerks also had to deal with other stated occupations that didn't fit the existing categories. Separate summaries and tables were created to show the operations of churches, land, institutions and industries.

For the Māori census, more details were collected than in previous years, including the tribe and hapū (sub-tribe) of each person.

The completed census for both Māori and non-Māori was submitted to Parliament on 27 June 1887.

== Non-Māori population ==
Provincial District	Population	Percent (%) change since 1881	Largest borough in each district	Borough population	Borough and suburbs population
Auckland	130,379	+ 31.10%	Auckland	33,161	57,048
Taranaki	17,999	+ 21.14%	New Plymouth	3,093	
Wellington	77,536	+ 26.34%	Wellington	25,945	27,833
Hawke's Bay	24,568	+ 41.46%	Napier	7,680	
Marlborough	11,113	+ 19.49%	Blenheim	3,094	
Nelson	30,203	+ 15.83%	Nelson	7,315	
Westland	15,931	+ 6.13%	Greymouth	3,133	
Canterbury	121,400	+ 8.21%	Christchurch	15,265	44,688
Otago	149,154	+ 11.24%	Dunedin	23,243	45,518
Chatham Islands	199	-17.77%			
Total	578,482	+ 18.07%			

== Birthplaces of the non-Māori population ==
For the first time, more than half the non-Māori population (51.89%) was New Zealand-born, compared to 45.6% in 1881. 'British allegiance' Included everyone born in British possessions, naturalized British subjects and British subjects born abroad. Those who were born at sea or who had not specified a birthplace were deemed British if they had a British-sounding name. Westland had the most foreign subjects (10.36%), and Canterbury had the fewest (1.64%).

There were 4,550 people born in China, but this figure includes eight non-Chinese people. This was a decrease of over 9% from the 5,033 Chinese-born people (including 39 non-Chinese) counted in 1881. The number of Chinese recorded in the census was 4542, of whom 15 were female. 2,727 Chinese people lived in Otago, with smaller populations in Westland (825), Nelson (478), Canterbury (164), Auckland (163) and Wellington (147). Most of the Chinese in Otago, Westland and Nelson lived on the goldfields in those locations.

Birthplace	Number	Percent (%) of population
British possessions:		
New Zealand	300,190	51.89
Australian colonies	17,245	2.98
England	125,657	21.72
Wales	1,981	0.34
Scotland	54,810	9.48
Ireland	51,408	8.89
Other British possessions	3,953	0.68
Foreign countries:		
Germany	5,007	0.87
Denmark and possessions	2,178	0.38
Sweden	1,439	0.25
Norway	1,338	0.23
France and possessions	786	0.14
Austria	536	0.09
Italy	438	0.08
Switzerland	393	0.07
Russia and possessions	316	0.05
Portugal and possessions	198	0.03
Holland and possessions	140	0.02
Poland	129	0.02
Greece	99	0.02
Belgium	89	0.01
Spain and possessions	76	0.01
Other European countries	42	0.01
China	4,550	0.79
America, North America (so returned)	1,088	0.19
United States of America	683	0.12
Africa	167	0.03
Other foreign countries	193	0.03
At sea	1,324	0.23
Unspecified	2,029	0.35
Total	578,482	100
Allegiance:		
British subjects	560,598	96.91
Foreign subjects	17,884	3.09
Total	578,482	100

== Occupations ==
The non-Māori census asked what occupations the population followed. The most populous category, Order III: domestic duties, includes children in families. For those over 20 years of age, 0.53% of males and 82.63% of females were involved in domestic duties. The most common occupations for men were those related to farming, market gardening and labouring on farms, as well as fishermen (65,178). 690 men were employed to kill rabbits, which had become a pest. The most common occupations for women were domestic servant (13,471), and dressmaking and millinery (5,472). Half of the domestic servants (6,750) were girls under 20 years old. There were 1,371 male teachers and 1704 female teachers (plus 502 governesses). Unemployed people were included under their usual or former stated occupation, and hospital patients, asylum and prison inmates were included under charitable institutions, Order XV: 'Persons supported by the community'.

Class	Order	Occupations	Total number	Number of males	% males	Number of females	% females
I. Professional	I.	Persons engaged in General or Local Government, or the defence or protection of the country	2,940	2,911	99.0%	29	1.0%
I. Professional	II.	Persons engaged in the learned professions, or in literature, art, science (with their immediate subordinates)	9,544	6,028	63.2%	3516	36.8%
II. Domestic	III.	Persons engaged in the domestic offices or duties of wives, mothers, mistresses of families, children, relatives (not otherwise returned)	350,445	118,102	33.7%	232,343	66.3%
II. Domestic	IV.	Persons engaged in entertaining and performing personal offices for man	22,278	5,074	22.8%	17,204	77.2%
III. Commercial	V.	Persons who buy and sell, keep or lend money, houses, or goods of various kinds	11,661	10,859	93.1%	802	6.9%
III. Commercial	VI.	Persons engaged in the conveyance of men, animals, goods, and messages	15,539	15,459	99.5%	80	0.5%
IV. Agricultural	VII.	Persons possessing, working, or cultivating land, raising or dealing in animals, or following pursuits subsidiary thereto	65,178	64,259	98.6%	919	1.4%
V. Industrial	VIII.	Persons engaged in working and dealing in art and mechanic productions in which matters of various kinds are employed in combination	20,750	20,470	98.7%	280	1.3%
V. Industrial	IX.	Persons working and dealing in textile fabrics, dress, and in fibrous materials	17,042	8,100	47.5%	8,942	52.5%
V. Industrial	X.	Persons working and dealing in food and drinks	9,114	8,817	96.7%	297	3.3%
V. Industrial	XI.	Persons working and dealing in animal and vegetable substances	5,663	5,641	99.6%	22	0.4%
V. Industrial	XII.	Persons working and dealing in minerals	23,858	23,851	100.0%	7	0.0%
VI. Indefinite and non-productive	XIII.	Labourers and others (branch of labour undefined)	17,053	16,837	98.7%	216	1.3%
VI. Indefinite and non-productive	XIV.	Persons of property and rank (not returned under any office or occupation)	739	519	70.2%	220	29.8%
VI. Indefinite and non-productive	XV.	Persons supported by the community, and of no specified occupation	4,202	2,864	68.2%	1,338	31.8%
		Total of specified occupations	576,006	309,791	53.8%	266,215	46.2%
		Occupations not stated	2,476	2430	98.1%	46	1.9%
		Total population	578,482	312,221	54.0%	266,261	46.0%

== Māori census ==
Māori census information was collected by officials who visited each settlement and spoke to the people there, rather than having them fill in forms. Enumerators had to overcome distrust and suspicion about why the information was required, as some Māori thought that their names and ages might be used by the government to impose a new tax. Local chiefs were asked to help the enumerators gather information.

Officials were concerned about an apparent drop in the Māori population but in some cases found it difficult to count people as the population was quite nomadic. In Thames, the Māori birth rate had decreased. The local newspaper reported: "It is to be feared that when the census returns come to hand, it will be found that the Ngatimaru and the neighbouring tribes have diminished in numbers to an alarming degree. The adoption of European vices, which the natives are ever more ready to assume than the corresponding virtues, has been an active principle in the process of depopulation". Spencer von Sturmer, reporting the results of the Māori census in Hokianga, stated that although many children were born to Māori in his district, only a few survived infancy. He blamed this on poor food, exposure, lack of ordinary care and cleanliness, and the ministrations of tohunga. Work in harsh conditions on the gumfields contributed to the poor health of Māori in the area.

Māori farmed sheep, cattle and pigs and cultivated potatoes, oats and maize, but enumerators reported that Māori had different ideas of ownership, exaggerating or guessing stock numbers as many animals were owned communally and allowed to run wild. Maori in the Hutt Valley grew strawberries and vegetables to sell in Wellington.

North Island: principal tribes, showing change from 1881	1881	1886
Arawa	3,938	3,184
Muaupoko	81	91
Ngaiterangi	996	992
Ngapuhi	5,564	5,549
Ngatiawa	1,869	2,067
Ngatikahungunu	4,730	5,175
Ngatimaniapoto	1,528	1,685
Ngatimaru	1,349	1,580
Ngatiporou	4,381	3,287
Ngatiraukawa	1,443	2,192
Ngatiruanui	769	1,065
Ngatiwhatua	487	596
Rangitane	89	105
Rarawa	2,775	2,034
Taranaki	460	947
Urewera	1,850	1,901
Waikato	5,233	4,000
Whakatohea	625	845
Whanau-a-Apanui	748	617
Whanganui	2,560	1,440
Unspecified	126	175
Population North Island	41,601	39,527
Population South Island and Stewart Island	2,061	2,046
Population Chatham Islands (including Moriori)	125	195
Māori Prisoners from North Island in South Island gaols	310	
Maori wives living with European husbands		201
Grand total	44,097	41,969
