= L. Jean Camp =

American computer scientist

Linda Jean Camp is an American computer scientist whose research concerns information security, with a focus on human-centered design, autonomy, and safety. She has also made important contributions to risk communication, internet governance, and the economics of security. She is the Bank of America Distinguished Professorship in Security Analysis in the department of Software and Information Systems at UNC-Charlotte. She was previously a professor of informatics in the Luddy School of Informatics, Computing, and Engineering at Indiana University Bloomington, where she directs the Center for Security and Privacy in Informatics, Computing, and Engineering.

== Education and career ==
Camp earned a double bachelor's degree in mathematics and electrical engineering from the University of North Carolina in 1989, also working as a nuclear power engineer in the last year of her studies. She continued at the University of North Carolina for a master's degree in electrical engineering, supported as a Patricia Harris Fellow in the university's Optical Interconnects & Computer Generated Holography Laboratory. Next, she went to Carnegie Mellon University for graduate study in engineering and public policy, completing a Ph.D. there in 1996 with the dissertation Privacy & Reliability in Internet Commerce.

After a year of research at Sandia National Laboratories, she became an assistant professor and later associate professor in the Harvard Kennedy School from 1997 to 2004. She moved to Indiana University in 2004, and was promoted to full professor in 2011, after a year on leave as an IEEE Congressional Fellow in the office of North Carolina representative Bob Etheridge.

In 2016, Camp was a part of a small computer group which was involved in analysis of various DNS logs, making a relation between Trump Organization and Alfa Bank. She has published the details of her finding at her website, including a graph which shows the timeline of the connections made between the two parties. She also advocated against the subpoena filed by Alfa Bank requiring to identify the security researchers, who initially found the logs. In November 2020, the Indiana Court quashed the subpoena filed by Alfa Bank resulting in the identites of the researchers being kept a secret.

== Books ==
Camp is the author or editor of:

- Trust and Risk in Internet Commerce (MIT Press, 2000)
- Economics of Identity Theft: Avoidance, Causes and Possible Cures (Springer, 2007)
- Economics of Information Security (edited with Stephen Lewis, Kluwer, 2006)

== Recognition ==
Camp was elected as a Fellow of the American Association for the Advancement of Science in 2017, "for substantial contributions to the economics of information security, online risk communication, and human-centered computer security and privacy, including for populations often excluded in system design". She was elected as an IEEE Fellow in the 2018 class of fellows, "for research in human-centered risk and security". She was named a 2021 ACM Fellow, "for contributions to computer security and e-crime measures".
