= 1861 New Zealand census =

Third census of the Colony of New Zealand
- 16 December 1861; 164 years ago

General information
- Country: New Zealand

Results
- Total population: 101,915 (▲66%)
- Most populous provincial district: Otago (27,163)
- Least populous provincial district: Southland (1,820)

The 1861 New Zealand census was a national census of Europeans and "half-castes", taken on 16 December 1861.

The European population in 1851 was 26,707 people, and by 1858 this had increased by 121% to 59,254 people. The census in December 1861 counted 98,915 Europeans and "half-castes", which equalled an increase of 281% over the previous 10 years since the 1851 census. Adding an estimated 3000 gold diggers in the Otago gold fields gave a total of 101,915 people. 7294 military men and their families stationed in New Zealand were not included in the census. It was estimated that there were also 100 Europeans on Stewart Island and the Chatham Islands. The census showed that there were 2,760,163 sheep in the country.

Māori were not counted in the census, but it was estimated that the Maori population numbered around 55,336, almost all in the North Island. Reports about Māori settlements around New Zealand were sent to the government by Native Officers in 1861. These list names of leaders, their political affiliations and some population information.

The Otago gold rush which began in mid-1861 skewed some figures. One newspaper report stated: "By the census lately taken on the gold fields by the police, it appears that the number of names collected was 11,435. The Sub-Enumerators consider that there were about 4,000 they were not able to collect owing to the diggers rushing about. This makes the population in all, 15,435." In Wellington Province the population had only increased by 7% since 1858, and there were 414 fewer men aged between 21 and 40 than at the previous census in 1858. This was stated to be mainly due to the absence of men who had gone to the goldfields in Otago. There were more married women than married men in Wellington, and overall a higher proportion of women than was expected.

Taranaki was the only area which had a decrease in population, due to war there.

== European population changes since 1858 census ==
Region	1861 Population	Population change since 1858
Auckland	24,420	+34.3%
Taranaki	2,044	-22.9%
Hawke's Bay	2,611	+14.6%
Wellington	12,566	+14.6%
Nelson	9,952	+32.1%
Marlborough	2,299	+32.1%
Canterbury	16,040	+78.8%
Otago	27,163	+317.3%
Southland	1,820	+317.3%

== Birthplaces of the European population in 1861 ==
Country	Population	Percent (%)
(United Kingdom) New Zealand-born	27,604	27.86
England	36,128	36.49
Scotland	15,584	15.69
(Republic of Ireland) Ireland	8,831	8.92
Wales	472	0.48
(Australia) Australian colonies	2,579	2.61
(United Kingdom) Other British dominions	1,848	1.87
United States of America	720	0.73
Germany	780	0.78
France	319	0.32
Other foreign countries, at sea, not specified	4,206	4.25
Total New Zealand	99,021	100.0

== Religious denominations of the European population in 1861 ==
Denomination	Percent (%)
Church of England	44.89
Church of Scotland; Free Church of Scotland; and Other Presbyterians	21.41
Roman Catholic Church	10.98
Wesleyan Methodists	7.75
Congregational Independents	2.09
Baptists	1.98
Primitive Methodists	0.73
Lutherans	0.68
Hebrews	0.32
Society of Friends	0.07
Protestants	4.09
Other, or not stated	5.01
