= Norman Creek (Missouri) =

Stream in the U.S. state of Missouri

Norman Creek is a stream in Dent and Phelps counties in the Ozarks of Missouri. The stream headwaters are at 37°46′32″N 91°31′41″W and the confluence with the Dry Fork of the Meramec River is at 37°55′28″N 91°35′45″W.

Norman Creek has the name of the local Norman family.

== See also ==
- List of rivers of Missouri
