= 1867 New Zealand census =

National census of New Zealand in 1867

Fifth census of the Colony of New Zealand
- 19 December 1867; 158 years ago

General information
- Country: New Zealand

Results
- Total population: 218,668 (▲27.01%)
- Most populous provincial district: Canterbury (53,866)
- Least populous provincial district: Taranaki (4359)

The 1867 New Zealand census was held on 19 December 1867. Māori were not enumerated. The total population of people of non-Māori descent, including those from non-European countries such as China, was 218,668, plus 1,455 military men and their families. Across the country there was an average of 20.6% more men than women, down from almost 24% in 1864. This difference was most marked in Nelson Province, which had almost 38% more men than women. In Auckland Province there was only a 12% "excess" of men. Part of the discrepancy was acknowledged to be an influx of (male) miners to the gold fields. 97% of Chinese in New Zealand in 1867 lived in Otago Province, and around 18% of miners on the Otago goldfields were Chinese.

Although Māori were not counted in the 1867 census, estimates were made. Native Commissioner Alexander Mackay surveyed Māori in the provinces of Canterbury, Otago and Southland in early 1868, just a few months after the official census. His results showed a total of 1,438 Māori in those three provinces. Most Māori lived in the North Island, and the population there (including Nelson and the Chatham Islands) was estimated to be around 37,000, giving a total nationwide of about 38,500. The Registrar-General believed this estimate to be lower than the true number of Māori.

== Non-Māori population by province ==
Province	European population	Percent (%) change since 1864	Main town in each province	Population of town
Auckland	48,321	+14.68%	Auckland	11,153
Taranaki	4,359	−0.34%	New Plymouth	2,180
Wellington	21,950	+46.46%	Wellington	7,460
Hawke's Bay	5,283	+40.13%	Napier	1,827
Nelson	23,814	+99.94%	Nelson	5,652
Marlborough	4,371	−20.8%	Picton	465
Canterbury (including Westland)	53,866	+66.89%	Christchurch	6,647
Otago	48,577	−0.9%	Dunedin	12,777
Southland	7,943	−1.76%	Invercargill	2,006
Chatham Islands	184	+113.95%		
Total (exclusive of Military and their families)	218,668			
Military and families	1,455			
Total including Military	220,123			

== Birthplaces of the non-Māori population as of December 1867 ==
About 30% of the non-Māori population was born in England, with another 30% coming from the rest of the United Kingdom, and 30% was born in New Zealand.

Place of birth	Totals	Percent (%) of population
New Zealand	64,052	29.29
England	65,614	30.01
Ireland	27,955	12.78
Scotland	34,826	15.93
Wales	1,319	0.6
Australian Colonies	11,313	5.17
Other British Dominions	3,798	1.74
United States of America	1,213	0.56
France	553	0.25
Germany	2,838	1.3
China	1,219	0.56
Other foreign countries	2,448	1.12
At sea	751	0.34
Not specified	769	0.35
Total	218,668	100

== Religious affiliation ==
The proportion of each religious affiliation hadn't changed much from the 1864 census.

Denomination	Numbers		Percent (%) of Population	
Denomination	1864	1867	1864	1867
Church of England	73,118	92,990	42.47	42.53
Presbyterian Churches	42,058	54,929	24.43	25.12
Roman Catholic Church	21,507	30,413	12.49	13.91
Wesleyan Methodist Church	12,506	16,669	7.26	7.62
Congregational Independents	3,689	4,246	2.14	1.94
Baptists	3,391	4,353	1.97	1.99
Primitive Methodists	1,340	1,332	0.78	0.61
Lutheran Church	1,803	2,383	1.05	1.09
Hebrews	955	1,247	0.56	0.57
Society of Friends	128	146	0.08	0.07
Protestants (no particular denomination specified)	6,825	3,902	3.96	1.78
Otherwise Described	2,220	4,306	1.29	1.97
Not Described	2,618	1,752	1.52	0.8
Totals	172,158	218,668	100	100

== Occupations ==
Regarding difficulties in classifying and recording occupations, the Registrar-General pointed out:

Amongst the causes of this difficulty continue to be: --the great number of cases in which settlers follow more than one occupation;-- the instances (probably frequent) in which they entered in the Schedules the professions or callings to which they were brought up, or with which they would prefer to be identified, (perhaps from a notion of their superior "respectability", as if there were not true respectability in the diligent pursuit of any branch of honest industry), rather than those in which they are most habitually engaged, or from which they principally derive their maintenance; --the vagueness of many of the descriptions; --and the different names given to what may be regarded as really the same business.

Most of those who had no stated occupation were women and children, but small numbers of women did declare that they worked in various occupations. Most domestic servants were women. The Registrar-General noted that 17,049 women said they were engaged in "domestic duties", which was not an official category of work and would have represented unpaid work in the home. He admitted that the number of women saying their occupation was "domestic duties" was very incomplete as some provinces had no figures for this category.

Occupation	Numerical			Percent (%) of Population	
Occupation	1864	1867	Females included in total	1864	1867
Trade, Commerce, and Manufactures	7,625	10,194	246	4.43	4.66
Agricultural and Pastoral	12,089	18,863	242	7.02	8.63
Mechanics, Artificers, and Skilled Workers	12,118	13,695	1,397	7.04	6.26
Mining	12,527	20,372		7.28	9.32
Professions: Clerical, Medical, and Legal	...	733		0.36	0.33
Teachers, Surveyors, and Other Educated Professions	1,106	1,477	(teachers) 494	0.64	0.67
Labourers	12,639	13,025		7.34	5.96
Domestic and General Servants	6,202	7,259	5,055	3.6	3.32
Miscellaneous	13,951	27,829	1,040	8.11	12.73
No Occupation Stated (principally Women and Children)	93,282	105,221	("domestic duties") 17,409	54.18	48.12
Totals	172,158	218,668		100	100
