= John Lafayette Camp Jr. =

American attorney (1855–1918)

John Lafayette Camp Jr. (September 15, 1855 – August 10, 1918) was a judge in Texas state district court and United States Attorney for the western district of Texas.

== Biography ==
Camp followed his father John Lafayette Camp as a member of the Texas State Senate from 1887 to 1891. Then, for several years, he practiced law in San Antonio. In 1897 he was appointed Judge in State District Court, a post he held for 16 years. During this time he was connected with the preservation of the Alamo.

In 1913 President Wilson appointed him the U.S. Attorney for the western district of Texas. He would hold this post until his death. On June 27, 1915 he brought charges against former Mexico President Victoriano Huerta for conspiring with the German government. Huerta was arrested, and died six months later while still captive. In 1916, the Texas members of the U.S. Congress (all of the Representatives and both Senators) recommended that he replace retiring judge Maxey on the bench of the U.S. Court for the west Texas district. Wilson declined to nominate him, due to his policy of only naming judges younger than 60.

Camp died in San Antonio on August 10, 1918.

Texas Senate
Preceded by John C. Buchanan	Texas State Senator from District 6; 1885-1889	Succeeded by William C. Johnson
