= 1916 New Zealand census =

National census of New Zealand in 1916

Sixteenth census of the Dominion of New Zealand
- 15 October 1916; 110 years ago

General information
- Country: New Zealand
- Authority: Statistics New Zealand
- Website: stats.govt.nz (1916)

Results
- Total population: 1,149,225; 1,162,022; 1,162,293 (▲8.59%)
- Most populous provincial district: Auckland (308,766)
- Least populous provincial district: Westland (15,502)

The 1916 New Zealand census was the sixteenth national population census. The day used for the census was Sunday, 15 October 1916. The census of the Dominion of New Zealand revealed a total population of 1,149,225 – an overall increase of 90,981 or 8.59% over the 1911 census figure. (Note: Excludes members of armed forces absent overseas.) (Note: The population including the Cook and other annexed Pacific islands raises to 1,162,022.)

== Enumeration ==
In 1916 a new departure was made in connection with the enumeration of Māori. The Māori census counted 49,776 (excludes Māori counted in the European census) for a total of 52,997, fewer than 1,900 reside in the South Island. It was decided to enumerate the (South Island) Māori with the enumeration of the European population, the same schedules being used and the work done by the same Enumerators and Sub-Enumerators as for the European population. The North Island Māori census, however, was also taken in October.

=== Cost ===
The census of 1916 witnessed an important innovation in respect of the mode of distribution and collection of the census schedules, resulting in a considerable saving of expense. This was the substitution of the machinery of the Post Office for the old system of special Enumerators.

Not only was the work performed more economically (the cost of collection was approximately £20,600 in 1911 and £17,500 in 1916), but the schedules were in much better condition than at any previous census, the proportion of incomplete entries being infinitesimal, and the necessity for queries being reduced to practically nil. A point in connection with the 1916 census was the increase in the number of Enumerators' districts—ninety-five, as compared with fifty-nine in 1911—and it is probable that the consequential reduction in the average size of the districts made for increased efficiency.

== Summary ==
The results of the census covered these topics: (Separate Volumes) (published 1920)

- Part I Population (published 1918)
- Part II Ages (published 1918)
- Part III Birthplaces and Length of Residence (published 1918)
- Part IV Religions (published 1918) (20pp)
- Part V Education (published 1918)
- Part VI Infirmity (published 1918)
- Part VII Conjugal Condition (published 1918)
- Part VIII Fertility (published 1919)
- Part IX Occupations and Unemployment (published 1919)
- Part X Race Aliens (published 1919)
- Part XI Dwellings (published 1919)
- Part XII Households (published 1920)

Appendix A Maori Census
Appendix B Population of Cook and Other Annexed Pacific Islands*
Appendix C Religious Denominations (Places of Worship etc.) and Libraries
Appendix D Census of Industrial Manufacture*
Appendix E Poultry and Bees

== Population and dwellings ==
The principal natural divisions in New Zealand are the North, South, and Stewart Islands. These contain nearly the whole population of European descent, the Cook and other annexed islands being inhabited almost solely by Natives.
The populations of the various provincial districts are as follows:

Provincial District	Males	Females	Total
Auckland	155,298	153,468	308,766
Taranaki	28,773	27,150	55,925
Hawke's Bay	27,194	27,073	54,267
Wellington	119,572	112,542	232,114
Total, North Island	330,839	320,233	651,072
Marlborough	8,506	8,102	16,608
Nelson	22,415	20,836	43,251
Westland	8,088	7,414	15,502
Canterbury	88,085	93,784	181,869
Otago
Otago Portion	63,546	67,972	131,518
Southland Portion	30,296	29,333	59,629
Total, South Island^	220,936	227,441	448,377
Dominion of New Zealand	551,771	547,674	1,099,449
^Includes Stewart Island and Chatham Islands

=== Distribution ===
Distribution	Males	Females	Total
Population of the Dominion^{a}	551,775	547,674	1,099,449
Māori population^{b}	25,931	23,840	49,771
Morioris at Chatham Islands	2	3	5
Totals, New Zealand	577,715	571,510	1,149,225

^{a} European, (Māori living as Europeans) and others. (excluding Māori and residents of Cook and other Pacific islands).
^{b} Includes 3,529 half-castes living as Māoris.

Population of Cook and other annexed islands^{†}	6,553	6,244	12,797
Total, (excluding Samoa)	584,261	577,761	1,162,022
Samoa (Expeditionary Force and New Zealand civilians)	246	25	271
Total, Pacific Islands	584,507	577,786	1,162,293

Notes: † Includes 112 soldiers in camp in New Zealand.

== Birthplace ==
Question 8 on the census form asked the question: (a.) Country where born... (not county, town or subdivision.) If born outside the British Empire or if born at sea, add "P." if a British subject by parentage, add "N". if a British subject by nationalization. The figures show that of the total population of specified birthplace (1,097,841), 1,077,808, or 98.17 per cent., were born on British soil, 1.70 per cent, on foreign soil, and 0.13 per cent, at sea. For the overseas-born census usually resident population:

Country	Population	Percent (%)
New Zealand-born	794,139	72.34
Totals, Overseas-born	305,310	27.66
England	140,997	12.84
Scotland	51,951	4.73
Commonwealth of Australia	45,585	4.15
(United Kingdom) Ireland	37,380	3.40
Wales	2,197	0.20
(United Kingdom) Other British possessions	5,559	0.51
Totals, British soil	1,077,808	98.17
Austria-Hungary	2,365	0.22
German Empire	2,999	0.27
Denmark	2,244	0.20
Chinese Empire	2,041	0.19
Other foreign countries	9,007	0.82
Total foreign	18,656	1.70
At sea	1,377	0.13
Not stated	1,608	–
Total that specified a birthplace	1,097,841	100.0
New Zealand	1,099,449	100.0

== Race ==
The census form asked the question (a.) Country where born... (b.) Race.

Race	Males	Females	Population	%
European	547,505	545,519	1,093,024	95.11
Māori	27,446	25,551	52,997	4.61
Others	2,757	447	3,204	0.28
Chinese	2,017	130	2,147	–
Syrians	267	192	459	–
Hindus	167	14	181	–
Negroes	79	16	95	–
Japanese	55	4	59	–
New Zealand	577,715	571,510	1,149,225	100.0

=== Māori census ===
Location	Total population
North Island	47,545
South Island	1,590
Stewart Island	4
Chatham Islands
Māoris	253
Morioris	5
Māori wives living with European husbands	379
Totals, New Zealand	49,776
Source: (excludes Māori living as Europeans.)

=== Religion ===
Members of Christian denominations formed 95.71 per cent. of those who made answer to the inquiry at the last census; non-Christian sects were 0.44 per cent.; and those who described themselves as of no religion 0.39 per cent.; whilst "indefinite" religions constituted 1.12 per cent.

Denomination	1916 census	
Denomination	Number	Percentage
Christian	1,048,479	95.71%
Church of England	459,021	42.90%
Presbyterians	260,659	24.36%
Methodists	106,024	9.91%
Baptists	20,872	1.95%
Congregationalists	8,221	0.77%
Lutherans	3,530	0.33%
Salvation Army	10,004	0.94%
Brethren	9,758	0.91%
Church of Christ	9,249	0.86%
Unitarians	1,402	0.13%
Society of Friends	431	0.04%
Roman; Catholics and Catholics undefined	151,605	14.17%
Other Christians	7,703	0.72%
Hebrews	2,341	0.22%
Other specified religions	14,817	1.39%
No religion	4,311	0.40%
Totals, specified religions	1,069,948	100.00%
Object to state	25,577	–
Unspecified	3,924	–
Grand totals, New Zealand	1,099,449	–
