= John Lafayette Camp =

American politician (1828–1891)

Member of the Texas Senate from the 6 district
- In office 1875–1878
- Preceded by: J. L. Henry
- Succeeded by: William Amos Wortham

Personal details
- Born: February 20, 1828 Elyton, Alabama, US
- Died: July 16, 1891 (aged 63) San Antonio, Texas, US
- Party: Democratic Party
- Children: 5, including John Jr.
- Profession: Lawyer

Military service
- Allegiance: Confederate States
- Branch/service: Confederate States Army
- Rank: Colonel
- Unit: 10th Texas Cavalry

John Lafayette Camp Sr. (February 20, 1828 – July 16, 1891) was an American lawyer, politician and judge. He is the eponym of Camp County, Texas.

== Early life ==
John was born on February 20, 1828, in Elyton, Alabama, to John and Elizabeth Camp. After graduating from the University of Tennessee in 1848, he moved to Gilmer, Texas. He started a plantation and was admitted to the bar. In 1851, he married Mary Ann Ward, the daughter of a local doctor. The couple would have five children, including John Jr., who went on to become an attorney.

== Civil war ==
During the American Civil War, Camp enlisted to the Confederate States Army. He joined the 14th Texas Cavalry Regiment and was elected Captain of his company. By the end of the war, he was Colonel of the 10th Texas Cavalry, and attached to the Army of Tennessee. He was in actions at Cumberland Gap, Murfreesboro, and Chickamauga. John was wounded and captured twice.

== Political career ==
In 1866, the first district in Texas elected Camp to the U.S. Congress. However, in the struggle over seating of delegations connected with the Reconstruction, he was not allowed to take his seat. He remained active in Democratic Party politics.

Camp was elected to the Texas Senate in 1874, and served from 1875 until 1878, when Richard B. Hubbard appointed him a judge in State district court. He resigned as a judge in 1878, due to poor health.

== Later life and death ==
Camp moved to Arizona in 1884, working as a registrar in the land office. But, when the drier climate failed to improve his health, he came back to Texas two years later. He settled in San Antonio, living in his later years with his son John. He died there on July 16, 1891, aged 63.

Camp County, Texas was named for him after he introduced the Bill in the state Senate that created the county.

Texas Senate
Preceded by John Lane Henry	Texas State Senator from District 6; 1874-1876	Succeeded by William Amos Wortham
