= 1853 in New Zealand =

- Decades: 1830s; 1840s; 1850s; 1860s; 1870s
- See also: History of New Zealand; List of years in New Zealand; Timeline of New Zealand history

The following lists events that happened during 1853 in New Zealand.

The old provinces of New Munster and New Ulster are abolished and replaced by the Provinces of New Zealand. The first general election is held marking a major step on the way to self-government.

== Population ==
The estimated population of New Zealand at the end of 1853 is 61,850 Māori and 29,600 non-Māori.

== Incumbents ==
=== Regal and viceregal ===
- Head of State – Queen Victoria
- Governor – Sir George Grey

=== Government and law ===
New Zealand's first general election, held on the first of October. The House of Representatives has 37 elected members, and 14 members are appointed to the first Legislative Council. The 1st Parliament opens on 24 May 1854

The first Speaker of the House is not elected until Parliament opens on 24 May 1854. There is neither an official Prime Minister/Premier/Colonial Secretary or Finance Minister/Colonial Secretary until after the 2nd New Zealand Parliament is formed after the 1855 election. (see also 1st New Zealand Parliament).

- Chief Justice – William Martin
- Lieutenant Governor – Edward John Eyre (until 7 March when the Provinces of New Ulster and New Munster are abolished and replaced by the Provinces of New Zealand).
- Lieutenant Governor – Robert Henry Wynyard (until 7 March when the Provinces of New Ulster and New Munster are abolished and replaced by the Provinces of New Zealand).

== Events ==
- 17 January — With the passing of New Zealand Constitution Act 1852 the previous year the Provinces of New Zealand are created. The former New Ulster Province and New Munster Province, which had been in place since 1846, are abolished. New Ulster is split into Auckland, New Plymouth and Wellington; New Munster is split into Nelson, Canterbury and Otago. Each of the new provinces has its own legislature, known as a Provincial Council, that elects its own Speaker and Superintendent.
- 14 September – The Ann is the first steamship to visit Lyttelton.
- 16 November – The Wanganui Record starts publishing, but folds six weeks later, on 28 December.

== Sport ==
=== Rugby ===
- Christ's College pupils play a form of rugby football, the first to do so in New Zealand.

== Births ==
- 4 September: (in England) William Collins, politician.
- 3 October: Arthur Fulton, engineer
- 3 October: (in England) Albert Moss, cricketer.

== Deaths ==
- 21 November: Te Horetā Te Taniwha, Ngati Whanaunga iwi chief

== See also ==
- List of years in New Zealand
- Timeline of New Zealand history
- History of New Zealand
- Military history of New Zealand
- Timeline of the New Zealand environment
- Timeline of New Zealand's links with Antarctica
