= 1852 in New Zealand =

- Decades: 1830s; 1840s; 1850s; 1860s; 1870s
- See also: History of New Zealand; List of years in New Zealand; Timeline of New Zealand history

The following lists events that happened during 1852 in New Zealand.

== Population ==
The estimated population of New Zealand at the end of 1852 is 63,100 Māori and 27,633 non-Māori.

== Incumbents ==
=== Regal and viceregal ===
- Head of State – Queen Victoria
- Governor – Sir George Grey

=== Government and law ===
- 30 June: With the passing by the Parliament of the United Kingdom of New Zealand Constitution Act 1852 to grant the British colony self-government with a representative constitution the way is set for New Zealand’s first general election which will be held on 1 October 1853; the New Zealand Constitution Act 1846 is repealed.
- Chief Justice — William Martin
- Lieutenant Governor, New Munster — Edward John Eyre
- Lieutenant Governor, New Ulster — Robert Henry Wynyard

=== Main centre leaders ===
- Mayor of Auckland — Archibald Clark

== Events ==
- At the second election for the Council of the Borough of Auckland insufficient councillors are elected and the Council ceases functioning.
- 19 January: The Governor Wynyard, the first steamer built in New Zealand, launched at Freemans Bay, Auckland, makes her first trial trip.
- 3 June: The Guardian and Canterbury Advertiser starts publication but ceases after less than four months, on 16 September.
- 4 August: The Taranaki Herald starts publication. It will move to daily publishing in 1877. From 1935 until 1989 (when it will cease publication) it will be New Zealand's oldest newspaper.

== Births ==
- 29 February: Ewen Alison, politician

=== Unknown date ===
- A. L. Beattie, locomotive engineer/designer (in Yorkshire)
- Peter Seton Hay, civil engineer and surveyor (in Scotland)

== Deaths ==
- 30 June: Susannah Noon, New South Wales convict who settled in New Zealand
- 14 August: Michael Murphy, police magistrate
- 25 September: William Henry Valpy, Dunedin pioneer settler
- 26 October: Arthur Edward McDonogh, police magistrate

== See also ==
- List of years in New Zealand
- Timeline of New Zealand history
- History of New Zealand
- Military history of New Zealand
- Timeline of the New Zealand environment
- Timeline of New Zealand's links with Antarctica
