= South Island nationalism =

Independence movement in New Zealand

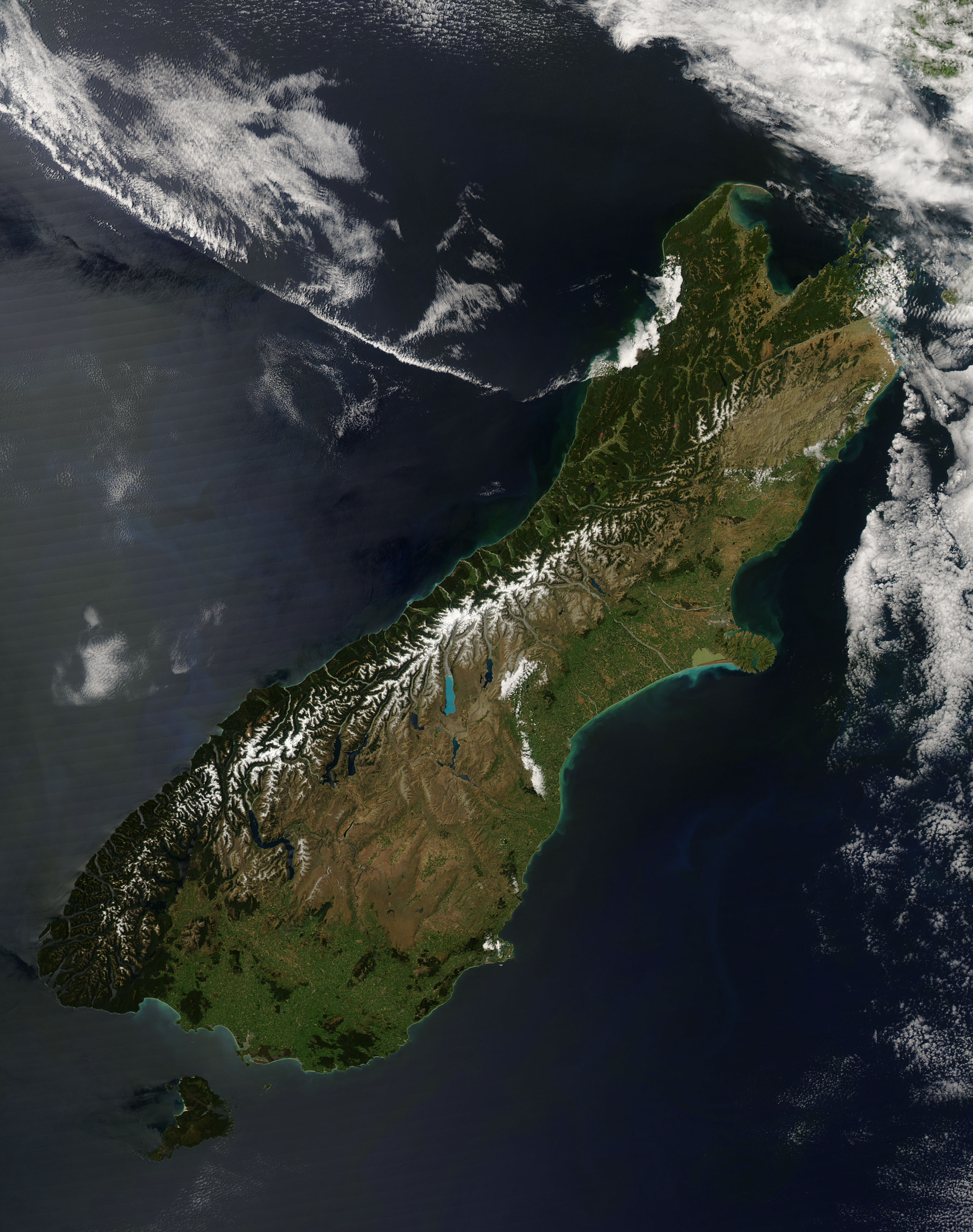
The South Island.

South Island nationalism refers to a movement for political independence in the South Island of New Zealand.

Various movements advocating political or economic independence for the South Island have arisen since the nineteenth century, due to perceptions that the central government based in the North Island does not represent or understand the south, but exploits its resources and the income it generates. The idea of independence was voted on by the New Zealand Parliament in 1865, and concern that the South Island could form a separate colony was one of the main factors in moving the capital of New Zealand from Auckland to the more centrally located Wellington in the same year.

== History ==
=== Māori period ===
The successive waves of Māori iwi (tribes) to settle the South Island – namely the Waitaha, the Ngāti Mamoe, and Ngāi Tahu – had been politically independent from their northern counterparts. Several attempts by the Ngāti Toa (from the Kāpiti Coast) to annex the island during the 1830s, under the leadership of Te Rauparaha, were eventually repelled by an alliance of the Southern chiefs of Ōtautahi and Murihiku. This independence from North Island iwi and their political beliefs is still reflected in modern South Island Māori culture. During Waitangi Day celebrations in 2010, Ngāi Tahu refused to fly the controversial Tino Rangatiratanga flag, with one tribe member saying the "flag has been nothing but trouble".

=== British governance ===
The first Europeans to settle in New Zealand were whalers, traders and missionaries who arrived in the early 19th century. The New Zealand Company sent four ships full of settlers to Wellington in 1840. In response to their attempts to establish a colony in Wellington, and French claims in Akaroa, Lieutenant-Governor William Hobson declared British sovereignty over all of New Zealand on 21 May 1840, and New Zealand briefly became part of New South Wales.

New Munster (1846 onwards)

When New Zealand was separated from the colony of New South Wales in 1841 and established as a colony in its own right, the Royal Charter effecting this provided that "the principal Islands, heretofore known as, or commonly called, the 'Northern Island', the 'Middle Island', and 'Stewart's Island', shall henceforward be designated and known respectively as 'New Ulster', 'New Munster', and 'New Leinster'". Government of the colony was centralised in Auckland. New Munster consisted of the South Island and the southern portion of the North Island, up to the mouth of the Patea River.

The situation was altered in 1846 when the New Zealand Constitution Act 1846 divided the colony into two provinces: New Ulster Province (the North Island) and New Munster Province (the South Island and Stewart Island). Each province had its own Lieutenant-Governor and Legislative and Executive Council, in addition to the Governor-in-Chief and Legislative and Executive Council for the whole colony. In 1851 the Provincial Legislative Councils were permitted to be partially elective.

The Provincial Council of New Munster had only one legislative session, in 1849, before it succumbed to pressure from Wellington settlers. Governor George Grey, sensible to the pressures, inspired an ordinance of the General Legislative Council under which new Legislative Councils would be established in each province with two thirds of their members elected on a generous (male-only) franchise. Grey implemented the ordinance with such deliberation that neither Council met before advice was received that the United Kingdom Parliament had passed the New Zealand Constitution Act 1852. This Act dissolved the New Ulster and New Munster provinces in 1853, after only seven years' existence, and New Munster was divided into the provinces of Canterbury, Nelson, and Otago. With the establishment of the New Zealand Parliament located in Auckland, James Macandrew the Superintendent of Otago Province fought what he saw as a bias towards central government at the expense of Otago. Similar resentment also occurred in other provinces, but the relative wealth of Otago (due to the 1861 gold rush) meant that it was felt there more strongly than elsewhere.

=== The provincial period ===
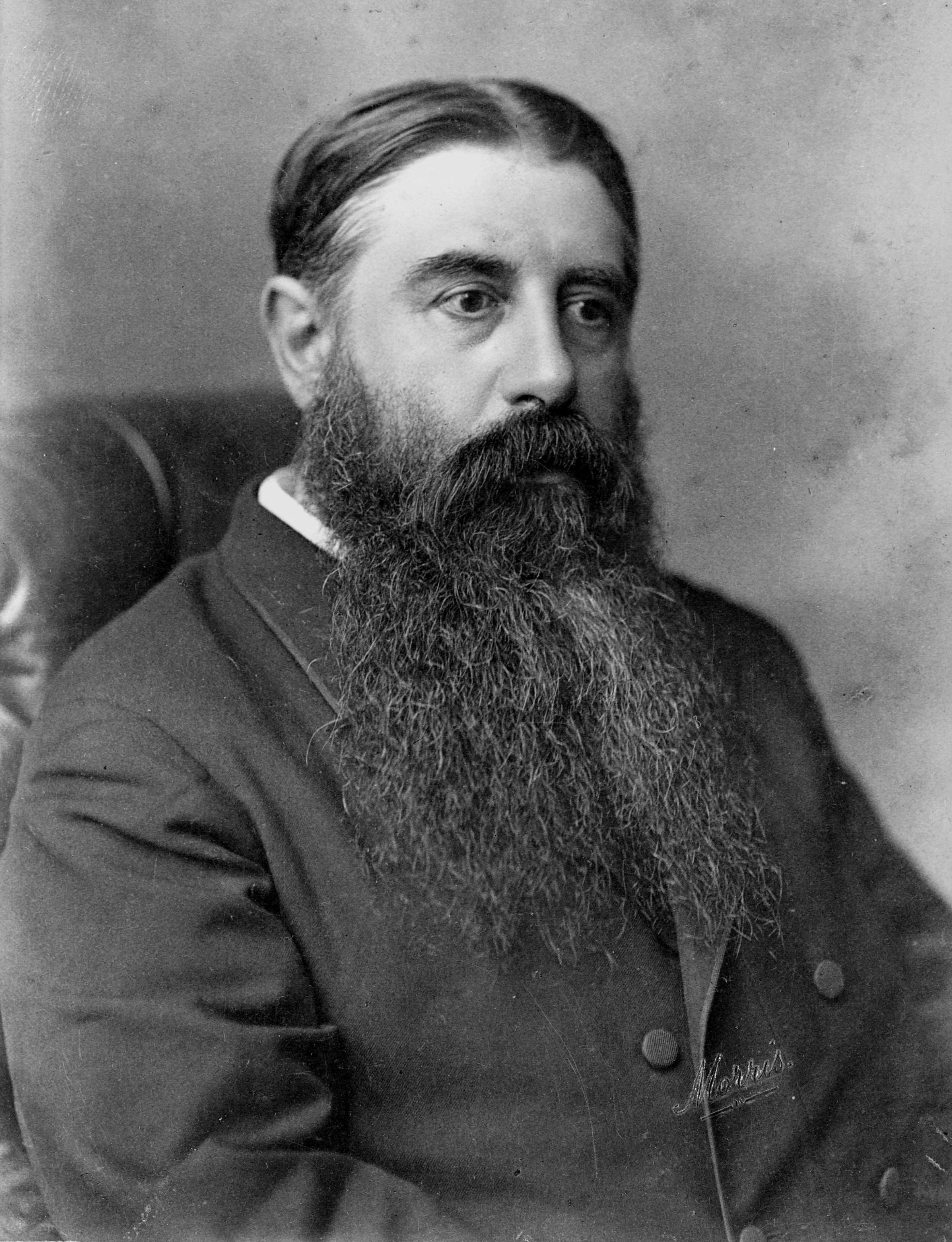
Julius Vogel an early advocate of South Island separation.

The North Island was convulsed by the New Zealand Wars during the provincial period of 1853 to 1876, but the South Island, with its small Māori population, was largely peaceful. The southern provinces developed more rapidly than did those in the north. The prospect of separating the North and South Islands into two colonies was raised in an editorial in the Nelson Examiner in March 1860. The editorial discussed the differences in settlement and resources in the two islands, and, pointing out that the government in Auckland was a long way from the South Island, suggested that the seat of government should be moved to a more central position in Wellington.

In 1861, gold was discovered at Gabriel's Gully in Central Otago, sparking a gold rush, and Dunedin became the wealthiest city in the country. Many in the South Island resented financing the North Island's wars and were less ready to accept direction from a General Assembly whose impoverished members "looked with ill-concealed envy" on the resources of the South. The Otago Colonist noted "the sad but inevitable result of joining by artificial bonds of union countries that Nature (by Cook Strait) designed should be separate". Julius Vogel (who later became a politician and led the centralists to the abolition of provincialism) founded the Otago Daily Times in 1861 and in March 1862 wrote an editorial where he looked forward to "a glorious future – the separation of the two islands". Otago was in terms of shipping days three times as far from the capital of Auckland as it was from Victoria or Tasmania. A large public meeting in Dunedin in May 1862 endorsed the principle of separation – though Southland, which had achieved independence from Dunedin only by appealing to central government, and Canterbury, understanding that Dunedin saw itself as the South Island's capital-to-be, were both unenthusiastic.

The Southern Separation League was formed in Dunedin in 1865. At a meeting of the league, Vogel proposed that "the time has arrived when the separation of the Middle from the North Island of New Zealand would be attended with benefit to the colonists of both Islands".

In an attempt to hold its place as a capital of some description, in 1865 Auckland joined forces with Otago to support a resolution in the General Assembly calling for independence for both islands. They lost by 31 votes to 17. In the same year the political concerns of the South Island provinces prompted the colonial government to move the capital south from Auckland to Wellington. By 1870 only Canterbury and Otago could be said to be flourishing. Seeing that the weaker provinces were heading for insolvency, Vogel opted in favour of centralism, and changed his electorate to stand for a northern seat.

=== 20th century ===
In 1950, Ivon Wilson, president of the Automobile Association (Southland) complained that the South Island was not getting a fair share of the government's road building funds, and suggested the money was being used in the North Island. He stated that "If the South Island had a federal system of Government, taxation could be reduced by 50 per cent" and went on: "We provide one-twenty-fifth of the individual taxation in New Zealand, but we don't get an equal return". The Minister of Works, Stan Goosman, responded that "there appears to be a great deal of parochialism in the south, and it is something that has to be overcome. This business of South Island versus North Island cannot continue." He added: "There should be no talk of federal governments. Let us remember that we are all New Zealanders and should work together for the good of the country. One part of the Dominion relies on another, and the basis of co-operation has to be continued.”

==== Hydroelectric power ====
In the 1950s and 1960s there was extensive economic growth in the south of the South Island: Invercargill Airport and the port at Bluff were upgraded and freezing works and fertiliser works were built. During the same period the population of the North Island was growing much faster than that in the South Island, leading the government to investigate the feasibility of installing a cable across Cook Strait to transfer electricity from the South Island to the North Island to meet increasing demand. The Chief Engineer of the State Hydroelectric Department prepared a paper noting the limited potential for more hydroelectric generation development in the North Island and suggested that hydroelectricity plants be built in the South Island to power the lower half of the North Island.

In 1961, a deputation from the South Island Local Bodies Association visited the Prime Minister, stating: "The issue that this deputation, representing almost the whole of the South Island, wishes to discuss with you today can be explained in very simple terms: what will be the long-term effect on our national life of the transfer of hydro-electric power from the South Island to the North Island, and what steps does the Government propose to take to ensure that there will be a measure of balance in the industrial growth of the country as a whole, and a consequent population and political balance?" The deputation didn't oppose the Cook Strait cable as long as South Island needs were met, but said that unless heavy industrial enterprises were built in the South Island near the main sources of power generation, "the disparity in industrial growth between the islands would increase". In 1963 the government committed to building a hydroelectric plant at Manapouri to supply an aluminium smelter at Tiwai Point.

==== South Island Independence Movement ====
In 1978 the South Island Independence Movement (also known as the South Island Movement) formed in Dunedin, claiming that the South Island was "being exploited by a more politically powerful North Island". The group's leaders were dentist Paul Powell, accountant George Moreton and environmental campaigner Brian Turner. Moreton said the South Island could function independently of the North Island. Half of New Zealand's export earnings came from the south’s meat and wool, "and if the island was autonomous it could more than sustain the imports necessary for a high standard of living". Powell suggested that both islands could have equal representation in Parliament, that the South Island could become a self-governing state within a federal system, or that it could secede from New Zealand. Powell would not comment on suggestions circulating at the time to "cut the cable" across Cook Strait, but was worried about the continuing population drift to the North Island.

In 1981, the member of Parliament for Christchurch Central, Geoffrey Palmer (who later became Prime Minister) stated that the South Island Movement's suggested solutions to South Island dissatisfaction would cause more problems than they solved. Palmer suggested that local government should be reformed so that local bodies had more responsibility and a bigger role in planning and administration of regional and local needs. This would reduce the sense of being dictated to and domination from central government in Wellington. Dynamic regional development would encourage investment and stop the population drift. He also suggested that the proportion of South Island seats in Parliament could be increased.

==== South Island Party ====
In 1997 the South Island Party was formed by publican Pat Carrigan to advocate for greater representation for the South Island. The party had three main principles: adequate representation for South Island interests, a fair return of the South Island's share of the gross domestic product (GDP) and a measure of control over its natural resources. Spokesman Neville Bowie noted that Otago and Southland were responsible for 38.5% of GDP, and the whole South Island generated more than 50% of GDP with only 9% of New Zealand's population. He said "we've got to be realistic but we want a fair amount of that returned to us so we can give our youth some hope and self esteem." By May 1998 the party had over 1,000 members including 40 North Islanders, with 13 active branches. In the 1999 elections, the party put forward five electorate candidates and seven list candidates, but won no seats. The party's registration was cancelled at its own request on 14 June 2002, and it did not contest the 2002 elections.

=== 21st century ===
==== South Island First ====
In 2007, politician Richard Prosser called for the establishment of a South Island parliament as part of a New Zealand confederation. He claimed that the government had become too large and bureaucratic and was too focussed on Auckland to be able to represent the South Island effectively. Important issues for the South Island at the time included the high country tenure review process and the threat of huge numbers of wind turbines on wild landscapes. Prosser stated that "systems of government have to reflect the realities of the people who live under them, and that means they must change from time to time" and said "New Zealand had regional governments once, and perhaps it is time to look at that again". Prosser said that he wanted to restart the South Island Party, a political party which had contested the 1999 general election. He founded a pressure group of the same name, which was active around 2008, but it did not register as a political party. Instead, Prosser helped promote South Island First, another pressure group which had the objective of establishing a southern parliament "to provide the South Island with administrative, economic and financial independence 'whilst still retaining a unified New Zealand'".

==== South Island Independence Movement (again) ====
In 2013, Solomon Tor-Kilsen from Timaru set up a new South Island Independence group which aimed to establish the South Island as a separate nation independent from New Zealand. Tor-Kilsen stated: "You've got all the taxes that are raised in the South Island, all the GDP of the South Island, and that goes into the collective coffers and we don't get anywhere near back what we put in". He stated that there was "massive discontent" in the South Island and said that "people want to look after themselves and they don't want to be dictated to by governments really far away that are dictating what they should be doing in their own backyard." Pat and Margaret Carrigan of the 1990s South Island Party supported the new movement. The S.I.I.M. was criticised for posts by followers on its Facebook page who have expressed extremist right-wing rhetoric and promotion of violence and illegal activity.

== South Island identity ==
The March 2010 issue of North & South magazine featured an article entitled "The Great Divide" which sought to explain the geographic, cultural and language differences between the North and South Islands through a panel of guest writers.

Anna Rogers, a Christchurch writer, once said "[South Island identity is] based on the kinder, cheaper, less-harried lifestyle of the South Island, as compared, most notably, with Auckland." The Southern man remains a familiar stock character throughout the country.

Compared to the more populated and multi-ethnic North Island, the South Island has a smaller, more homogeneous resident population of 1,256,700 (June 2025).

New Zealand Europeans form the majority in all districts of the South Island.

== In popular culture ==
In 1979 Radio Avon in Christchurch released a novelty song called 'Cut the cable' by the Freda South Singers. It featured Jon Gadsby and David MacPhail (who imitated then-Prime Minister Robert Muldoon on the track).
