= General Legislative Council =

Early legislative council of New Zealand

The General Legislative Council, also known as the New Zealand Legislative Council, was established in 1841 when New Zealand was created as a Crown colony separate from New South Wales. The Legislative Council consisted of the governor, the colonial secretary, the colonial treasurer, and senior justices of the peace; all members were appointed. From 1848, there were additional provincial Legislative Councils for New Ulster and New Munster. The general Legislative Council had twelve sessions; the first ten were held in Auckland and the last two in Wellington. In May 1852, an act provided for two thirds of the membership of the provincial Legislative Councils to be elected. Elections for the New Ulster Province had already been held when news was received that the New Zealand Constitution Act 1852 had been passed by the Parliament of the United Kingdom. No meeting of the elected members was ever called. The New Zealand Constitution Act 1852 disestablished the Legislative Council when writs for the first election of members of the New Zealand House of Representatives were returned. The initial legislative councils ceased to exist in September 1853.

The New Zealand Constitution Act 1852 created a bicameral general assembly consisting of the governor, a Legislative Council and a House of Representatives, an executive council (nominally appointed by the governor), and the Provinces of New Zealand (New Zealand was divided into six provinces).

== General Legislative Council ==
The New Zealand Legislative Council was formed in 1841 by governor William Hobson. The Charter for Erecting the Colony of New Zealand took effect from 3 May 1841; at that time the capital of New Zealand had just shifted from Okiato (Old Russell) to Auckland. The first session of the New Zealand Legislative Council was held in Auckland from 24 May to 10 July 1841. The initial members were Hobson as governor, Willoughby Shortland as colonial secretary, Francis Fisher as attorney-general, George Cooper as colonial treasurer, and a number of JPs: William Wakefield, William Cornwallis Symonds, James Reddy Clendon, Edmund Halswell, and George Butler Earp.

James Coates was clerk to the general Legislative Council during the entire time of its existence.

== Sessions of the general Legislative Council ==
The general Legislative Council sat for twelve sessions, with the third session split across two periods. The sessions in Wellington were held in a room in the court house:

Session	from	to	location
1	24 May 1841	10 July 1841	Auckland
2	14 December 1841	15 March 1842	Auckland
3	9 January 1844	13 January 1844	Auckland
3	14 May 1844	18 July 1844	Auckland
4	19 September 1844	28 September 1844	Auckland
5	4 March 1845	22 April 1845	Auckland
6	12 December 1845	13 December 1845	Auckland
7	5 October 1846	18 November 1846	Auckland
8	26 July 1847	16 October 1847	Auckland
9	16 November 1848	18 November 1848	Auckland
10	1 August 1849	25 August 1849	Auckland
11	19 May 1851	2 August 1851	Wellington
12	12 December 1852	5 January 1853	Wellington

== Membership ==
The general Legislative Council had 41 members during its existence. Where membership was due to holding an office, this is identified in the table below. Members were entitled to the honorific prefix "Honourable". The last session of the council was adjourned in January 1853, and those who were present at this session, or not present but still held membership, are identified accordingly. There was no public announcement of the general Legislative Council having ceased to exist, but based on the New Zealand Constitution Acts and the date of writs received, it is likely that membership terminated on 28 September 1853.

Henry Tancred and William Deans were both invited in 1851 to represent Canterbury, but both declined.

Member	Office held	Appointed	Retired
William Hobson	Governor	3 May 1841	10 September 1842
Willoughby Shortland	Colonial Secretary	3 May 1841	26 December 1843
Willoughby Shortland	Administrator	10 September 1842	26 December 1843
Francis Fisher	Attorney-General	3 May 1841	28 September 1841
George Cooper	Colonial Treasurer	3 May 1841	9 May 1842
William Wakefield		3 May 1841	September 1841
William Cornwallis Symonds		3 May 1841	23 November 1841
James Reddy Clendon		3 May 1841	13 January 1844
Edmund Halswell		3 May 1841	10 July 1841
George Butler Earp		3 May 1841	15 March 1842
William Swainson	Attorney-General	28 September 1841	(1)
William Field Porter		27 October 1841	6 June 1844
Alexander Shepherd	Colonial Treasurer	9 May 1842	(1)
Robert FitzRoy	Governor	26 December 1843	17 November 1845
Andrew Sinclair	Colonial Secretary	8 January 1844	(1)
Charles Clifford		13 May 1844	3 March 1845
William Brown		13 May 1844	3 March 1845
William Brown		16 July 1847	16 November 1848
Samuel Martin		13 May 1844	3 March 1845
Frederick Whitaker		3 March 1845	22 December 1845
William Donnelly		3 March 1845	22 December 1845
William Donnelly		30 September 1846	4 August 1847
Theophilus Heale		3 March 1845	22 December 1845
George Grey	Governor	18 November 1845	(1)
Alfred Domett		30 September 1846	14 February 1848
Alfred Domett	Colonial Secretary of New Munster	14 February 1848	(1)
Alexander Kennedy		30 September 1846	16 July 1847
Alexander Kennedy		16 November 1848	(2)
Frederick Merriman		9 August 1847	(2)
Frederick Merriman		16 November 1848	(2)
Edward John Eyre	Lieut-Governor of New Munster	28 January 1848	7 March 1853
William Anson McCleverty	Commander of the Forces	28 January 1848	(1)
Henry Petre	Colonial Treasurer of New Munster	28 January 1848	(1)
Charles Ligar	Surveyor-General	16 November 1848	(2)
Robert Clapham Barstow		16 November 1848	(2)
Dillon Bell		20 December 1848	(1)
William Hickson		20 December 1848	(2)
Daniel Wakefield	Attorney-General of New Munster	21 December 1848	(1)
William Hulme		24 July 1849	(2)
Henry Matson		24 July 1849	(2)
Sampson Kempthorne		24 July 1849	(2)
George Dean Pitt	Lieut-Governor of New Ulster	1 August 1849	8 January 1851
Stephen Carkeek	Collector of Customs	19 May 1851	(1)
William Mein Smith		19 May 1851	(1)
Constantine Dillon		3 June 1851	16 April 1853
William Cautley		3 June 1851	2 August 1851
George Cutfield		3 June 1851	2 August 1851

Table footnotes

(1) member present during the twelfth session
(2) member not present during the twelfth session
