= 1851 in New Zealand =

- Decades: 1830s; 1840s; 1850s; 1860s; 1870s
- See also: History of New Zealand; List of years in New Zealand; Timeline of New Zealand history

The following lists events that happened during 1851 in New Zealand.

== Population ==
The estimated population of New Zealand at the end of 1851 is 64,350 Māori and 26,707 non-Māori.

== Incumbents ==
=== Regal and viceregal ===
- Head of State – Queen Victoria
- Governor – Sir George Grey

=== Government and law ===
- Chief Justice — William Martin
- Lieutenant Governor, New Munster — Edward John Eyre
- Lieutenant Governor, New Ulster — George Dean Pitt until 8 January. Robert Henry Wynyard from 26 April.

=== Main centre leaders ===
- Mayor of Auckland — Archibald Clark

== Events ==
- Governor Grey issues a charter creating the Borough of Auckland. Archibald Clark becomes Mayor. (see also 1852)
- 11 January: The Otago Witness begins publication. It publishes fortnightly until August, and then weekly until its demise in 1932.
- 11 January: The Lyttelton Times begins publication. It will change its name to the Christchurch Times in 1929, and continue until 1935.
- 1 November: First national census held in New Zealand, counting European dwellings and population only.
- 24 December: The Governor Wynyard, the first steamer built in New Zealand, is launched at Freemans Bay, Auckland.

=== Undated ===
- Wynyard Pier is the first wharf built on the Auckland waterfront.

== Births ==
- 31 March: Francis Bell, politician and 20th Prime Minister of New Zealand.
- 11 September: Henry Samuel Fitzherbert, lawyer and politician.

== Deaths ==
- 8 January: George Dean Pitt, Lieutenant Governor of New Ulster
- 29 January: Wiremu Piti Pomare, tribal leader
- 28 October: Wiremu Hikairo, tribal leader

== See also ==
- List of years in New Zealand
- Timeline of New Zealand history
- History of New Zealand
- Military history of New Zealand
- Timeline of the New Zealand environment
- Timeline of New Zealand's links with Antarctica
