= 1846 in New Zealand =

- Decades: 1820s; 1830s; 1840s; 1850s; 1860s
- See also: History of New Zealand; List of years in New Zealand; Timeline of New Zealand history

The following lists events that happened during 1846 in New Zealand.

== Population ==
The estimated population of New Zealand at the end of 1846 is 71,050 Māori and 13,274 non-Māori.

== Incumbents ==
=== Regal and viceregal ===
- Head of State – Queen Victoria
- Governor – Sir George Grey

=== Government and law ===
- Chief Justice – William Martin

== Events ==
- 5 January: The Māori language magazine, Te Karere o Nui Tireni publishes its last issue. It started in 1842. It is revived as The Maori Messenger and Te Manuhiri Tuarangi between 1849 and 1863.
- 11 January: British forces occupy Ruapekapeka pa.
- 17 January: The Auckland Times ceases publication. The newspaper was first published in 1842.
- 11 March: The brig H.M.S. Osprey (Captain Patten) is driven ashore and wrecked at Herekino Harbour, having mistaken it for the entrance to the Hokianga Harbour, but no lives are lost.
- 7 May: Little Waihi landslide kills around 60 Maori, including Mananui Te Heuheu Tukino II.
- 16 May: Māori led by Te Mamaku attack the fortified outpost at Boulcott's farm near the modern-day Belmont in the Hutt Valley. Six troopers and an unknown number of Māori are killed as the attack is repulsed.
- 23 July: Te Rauparaha is captured by government forces at Porirua.
- 28 August: The New Zealand Constitution Act 1846 is passed by the Parliament of the United Kingdom with the intention of granting self-government to the colony. Governor George Grey suspends implementation of the majority of the Act, with the exception of the creation of New Ulster and New Munster Provinces, and it is superseded by the New Zealand Constitution Act 1852.
- December: Thomas Brunner sets out on a journey of exploration south of Nelson which will eventually take 18 months to complete.

== Births ==
- 1 May (in England): Edward Robert Tregear, surveyor, civil servant, linguist
- 7 April: Edwin Mitchelson, politician

== Deaths ==
- 7 May: Mananui Te Heuheu Tukino II, tribal leader

=== Unknown date ===
- Te Whatanui, tribal leader

== See also ==
- List of years in New Zealand
- Timeline of New Zealand history
- History of New Zealand
- Military history of New Zealand
- Timeline of the New Zealand environment
- Timeline of New Zealand's links with Antarctica
