= 1848 in New Zealand =

- Decades: 1820s; 1830s; 1840s; 1850s; 1860s
- See also: History of New Zealand; List of years in New Zealand; Timeline of New Zealand history

The following lists events that happened during 1848 in New Zealand.

== Population ==
The estimated population of New Zealand at the end of 1848 is 68,300 Māori and 17,166 non-Māori.

== Incumbents ==
=== Regal and viceregal ===
- Head of State – Queen Victoria
- Governor – Sir George Grey

=== Government and law ===
- Chief Justice — William Martin
- Lieutenant Governor, New Munster — From 28 January, Edward John Eyre
- Lieutenant Governor, New Ulster — From 14 February, George Dean Pitt

== Events ==
- 23 March: The founding of the city of Dunedin and Otago Province, with the arrival of the John Wickliffe, carrying Scottish settlers, at Port Chalmers.
- 23 June: Government House, in Auckland is burned to the ground by a fire believed to have started in the butler's pantry. Most chattels and Government documents were saved.
- 17 September – The first attempt at photography is made in New Zealand. Lieutenant-Governor Eyre is unsuccessful in his attempt to take a daguerreotype of Eliza Grey, wife of Governor Grey.
- 16 October – A magnitude 7.5 earthquake strikes Marlborough, causing three deaths.
- 13 December – Otago News begins publication. The newspaper publishes fortnightly until closing in 1850.

== Sport ==
=== Cricket ===
Cricket is played on the present site of The Octagon, Dunedin. A team from Otago challenges Wellington to a match, but the challenge is not accepted.

== Births ==
- 29 April: David Buick, politician.
- 26 August: Sarah Ann McMurray, woodcarver.
- 2 October: (in India) G. M. Thomson, scientist.

== Deaths ==
- 17 June: Joseph Burns, murderer.
- 19 September: William Wakefield, founder of Wellington.
- 22 September (in Berbice, British Guiana): Samuel Martin, land claimant, magistrate, journalist and writer.

== See also ==
- List of years in New Zealand
- Timeline of New Zealand history
- History of New Zealand
- Military history of New Zealand
- Timeline of the New Zealand environment
- Timeline of New Zealand's links with Antarctica
