= 1850 in New Zealand =

- Decades: 1830s; 1840s; 1850s; 1860s; 1870s
- See also: History of New Zealand; List of years in New Zealand; Timeline of New Zealand history

The following lists events that happened during 1850 in New Zealand.

== Population ==
The estimated population of New Zealand at the end of 1850 is 65,650 Māori and 22,108 non-Māori.

== Incumbents ==
=== Regal and viceregal ===
- Head of State – Queen Victoria
- Governor – Sir George Grey

=== Government and law ===
- Chief Justice – William Martin
- Lieutenant Governor, New Munster – Edward John Eyre
- Lieutenant Governor, New Ulster – George Dean Pitt

== Events ==
- 16 December – The Charlotte-Jane, one of the First Four Ships bringing settlers to Canterbury arrives in Lyttelton Harbour followed by the Randolph later the same afternoon.
- 17 December – The George Seymour arrives in Lyttelton.
- 21 December – Otago News finishes publication. The newspaper started in 1848.
- 27 December – The Cressy is the last of the First Four Ships to arrive at Lyttelton.

== Foundations ==
- St Mary's Seminary

== Births ==
- 7 January: Joseph James Fletcher, Australian biologist (d. 1926)
- 8 April: Thomas Hislop, Mayor of Wellington (in Scotland)

== Deaths ==
- 7 August: Hone Heke, tribal leader
- 15 October: William Darby Brind, master mariner and whaler (probable date of death)

=== Unknown date ===
- Te Rohu, tribal leader
- Rawiri Tareahi, tribal leader

== See also ==
- List of years in New Zealand
- Timeline of New Zealand history
- History of New Zealand
- Military history of New Zealand
- Timeline of the New Zealand environment
- Timeline of New Zealand's links with Antarctica
