= 1849 in New Zealand =

- Decades: 1820s; 1830s; 1840s; 1850s; 1860s
- See also: History of New Zealand; List of years in New Zealand; Timeline of New Zealand history

The following lists events that happened during 1849 in New Zealand.

== Population ==
The estimated population of New Zealand at the end of 1849 is 67,000 Māori and 19,543 non-Māori.

== Incumbents ==
=== Regal and viceregal ===
- Head of State – Queen Victoria
- Governor – Sir George Grey

=== Government and law ===
- Chief Justice – William Martin
- Lieutenant Governor, New Munster – Edward John Eyre
- Lieutenant Governor, New Ulster – George Dean Pitt

== Events ==
- 4 January: The Māori language magazine, The Maori Messenger or Ko te Karere Maori publishes its first issue, replacing Te Karere o Nui Tireni which stopped publishing in 1846. The magazine continues under several titles until 1863.

== Economy ==
- The first coal mine in New Zealand is opened at Saddle Hill near Dunedin.

== Sport ==
=== Horse racing ===
The committee which has been controlling the racing at Epsom since 1841, ceases to function.

== Births ==
- 6 February: John Aitken, Mayor of Wellington.
- 27 April (in India): Alfred Newman, Mayor of Wellington.

== Deaths ==
- 27 November: Te Rauparaha, tribal leader

== See also ==
- List of years in New Zealand
- Timeline of New Zealand history
- History of New Zealand
- Military history of New Zealand
- Timeline of the New Zealand environment
- Timeline of New Zealand's links with Antarctica
