= Turoa (name) =

Turoa is a given name and surname. Notable people with the name include:

- Tūroa Royal (1935–2023), New Zealand educationist
- Te Peehi Turoa (died 1845), New Zealand tribal leader
- Tōpia Peehi Tūroa (died 1903), New Zealand tribal leader
