= 1845 in New Zealand =

- Decades: 1820s; 1830s; 1840s; 1850s; 1860s
- See also: History of New Zealand; List of years in New Zealand; Timeline of New Zealand history

The following lists events that happened during 1845 in New Zealand.

== Population ==
The estimated population of New Zealand at the end of 1845 is 72,500 Māori and 12,774 non-Māori.

== Incumbents ==
=== Regal and viceregal ===
- Head of State – Queen Victoria
- Governor – Captain Robert Fitzroy is dismissed on 18 November and replaced by Sir George Grey.

=== Government and law ===
- Chief Justice — William Martin

== Events ==
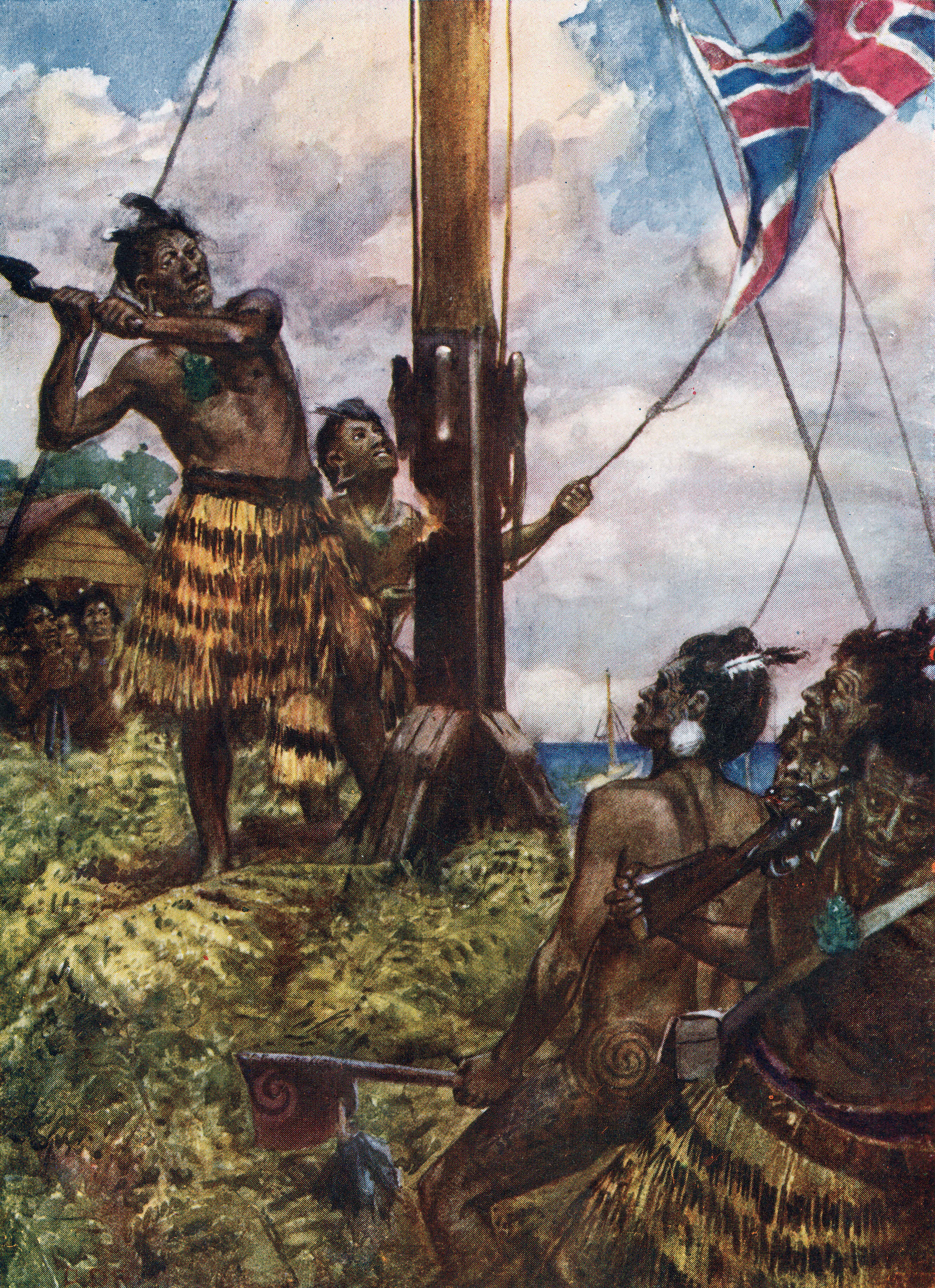
Depiction of Hone Heke cutting down the British flagstaff

- 19 January: Hone Heke cuts down the British flagstaff at Kororareka for the third time in the lead-up to the Flagstaff War.
- 2 April: The Wellington Independent publishes its first issue. The newspaper continues to publish bi-weekly or tri-weekly until 1874.
- 7 June: The New Zealander begins publishing. The Auckland-based newspaper publishes weekly, then bi-weekly and from 1859 daily. It will cease publishing in 1866.

== Births ==
- 11 October: Charles Johnston, Mayor of Wellington and politician.

=== Unknown date ===
- Samuel Brown, mayor of Wellington (in Ireland).
- John Roberts, mayor of Lower Hutt (in Scotland; October).

== Deaths ==
- 1 July: George Phillpotts, naval officer
- 8 September: Te Peehi Turoa, tribal leader

== See also ==
- History of New Zealand
- List of years in New Zealand
- Military history of New Zealand
- Timeline of New Zealand history
- Timeline of New Zealand's links with Antarctica
- Timeline of the New Zealand environment
