= Albert Moss =

Albert Moss may refer to:

- Albert Moss (cricketer)
- DJ Uncle Al, real name Albert Moss, Miami DJ

== See also ==
- Albert Mosse, German judge and legal scholar
