= Mathew Richmond =

New Zealand politician (1801–1887)

Major Mathew Richmond CB

1st Chairman of Committees
- In office 1865–1879
- Preceded by: New role
- Succeeded by: W. D. H. Baillie

Personal details
- Born: 1801 Salisbury, England
- Died: 5 March 1887
- Children: Andrew Richmond
- Occupation: Soldier; Resident magistrate; Commissioner of Crown Lands; Politician

Major Mathew Richmond CB (1801 – 5 March 1887) was a New Zealand colonial administrator and a politician. He was the first Chairman of Committees of the Legislative Council. Born in England to Scottish parents, he had a military career spanning 23 years before arriving in New Zealand.

== Early life ==
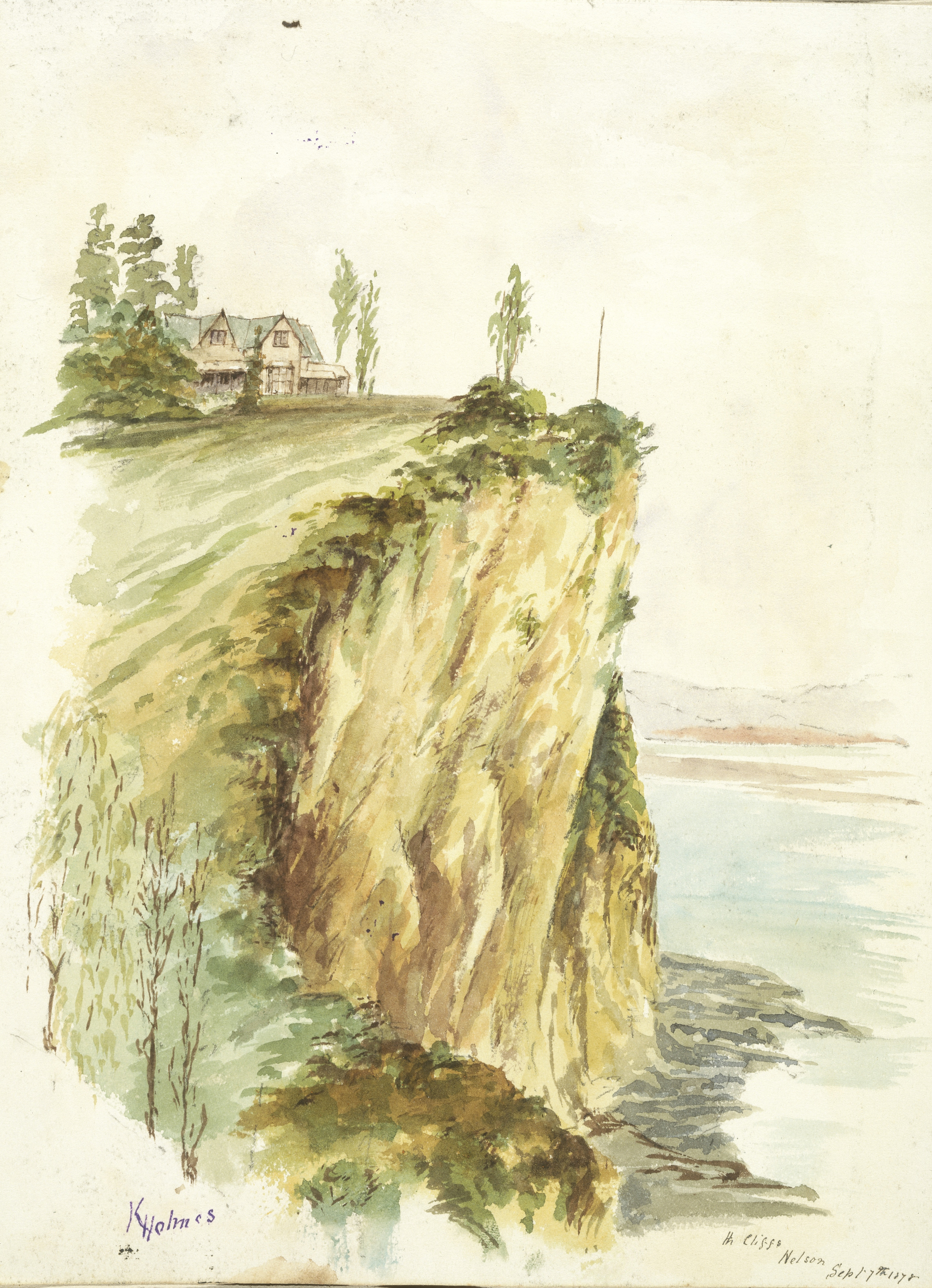
The Cliffs in Nelson, (painted by Katherine McLean Holmes in 1878) watercolour, possibly showing Richmond's house

Richmond was born in 1801 in Salisbury, England. His father was Major Richmond from Kilmarnock, Scotland, and he served with the Royal Scots Greys. He was educated at the Royal Military College from 1814 and had a total of 23 years of active army service. He joined the Cape Corps in South Africa in 1817. From the following year, he served with the 11th Regiment of Foot, where he gained the rank of a Captain in 1826. He served in Portugal in 1828–1829 before he went to the Ionian Islands as an administrator from 1829 to 1838, where he lived on Paxos. In 1838 or 1839, he was Deputy Judge Advocate in Saint John, New Brunswick, Canada, for the 96th Regiment of Foot. He went with the regiment to New South Wales in 1839.

Richmond married Mary Smith in 1830. They had one daughter and one son, Andrew Richmond.

== Life in New Zealand ==
The family came out to New Zealand in 1840 for Richmond to investigate land claims as a commissioner. The family lived in Wellington for some time and used Douglas Mary McKain for their health needs. During the time of the Wairau Affray, he managed to maintain order in Wellington together with Arthur Edward McDonogh. However, McDonogh swore in volunteers as special constables and supported the installations of defences. This resulted in Richmond succeeding McDonogh as Chief Police Magistrate for the Southern District in mid-1843, as the government regarded McDonogh actions as "extremely injudicious".

Richmond was further promoted to become Superintendent in early 1844. The Southern District was the area to the south of Cape Egmont. In his role, he was only responsible to the Governor (first Robert FitzRoy and then George Grey) and the Colonial Secretary (Andrew Sinclair) in Auckland. With the arrival of Edward John Eyre as Governor of New Munster, Richmond became resident magistrate at Nelson. From 1853 to 1858, Richmond was Commissioner of Crown Lands in Nelson. He lived at The Cliffs in Nelson.

Richmond was appointed by George Grey to the New Zealand Legislative Council on 23 June 1853. He retained his membership until his death. From 1865 until 1879, he was the first Chairman of Committees.

In 1860, he was awarded Companionship of the Order of the Bath (CB) for his military services. He died on 5 March 1887 aged 86 at his home in Nelson following a long illness and having been unconscious for the previous five days. He was buried at Wakapuaka Cemetery.

Political offices
New creation	Chairman of Committees of the Legislative Council; 1865–1879	Succeeded by W. D. H. Baillie
