= 1847 in New Zealand =

- Decades: 1820s; 1830s; 1840s; 1850s; 1860s
- See also: History of New Zealand; List of years in New Zealand; Timeline of New Zealand history

The following lists events that happened during 1847 in New Zealand.

== Population ==
The estimated population of New Zealand at the end of 1847 is 69,700 Māori and 14,477 non-Māori.

== Incumbents ==
=== Regal and viceregal ===
- Head of State – Queen Victoria
- Governor – Sir George Grey

=== Government and law ===
- Chief Justice – William Martin

== Events ==
- 5 August – The Ramilles arrives in Auckland with the first fencibles. They are initially housed at the Auckland Barracks.
- 15 September – The first hospital in Wellington is opened in Thorndon.
- 17 November – The first fencibles move to Onehunga.

=== Undated ===
- The first permanent hospital in Auckland opens in Grafton Gully.

== Births ==
- January 5: William Rose Bock, engraver, medallist, illuminator, stamp designer, lithographer and publisher (d. 1932)
- (unknown date, place): Charles King, cricketer (d. 1917)

== Deaths ==
- 12 March: Te Manihera Poutama, missionary
- 5 April: George Binns, chartist leader and poet
- 19 July (in Tasmania): Hohepa Te Umuroa, political prisoner
- 1 September: Tiakitai, tribal leader and trader

=== Unknown date ===
- Dicky Barrett, whaler and trader
- Tuhuru Kokare, tribal leader

== See also ==
- List of years in New Zealand
- Timeline of New Zealand history
- History of New Zealand
- Military history of New Zealand
- Timeline of the New Zealand environment
- Timeline of New Zealand's links with Antarctica
