= 1854 in New Zealand =

- Decades: 1830s; 1840s; 1850s; 1860s; 1870s
- See also: History of New Zealand; List of years in New Zealand; Timeline of New Zealand history

The following lists events that happened during 1854 in New Zealand.

== Population ==
The estimated population of New Zealand at the end of 1854 is 60,650 Māori and 32,554 non-Māori.

== Incumbents ==
=== Regal and viceregal ===
- Head of State – Queen Victoria
- Governor – Sir George Grey resigns on 6 January. Colonel Thomas Gore Browne is appointed later in the year, but does not arrive to take up his position until 6 September 1855.

=== Government and law ===
After New Zealand's first general election, held on 1 October 1853 the 1st Parliament opens on 24 May.

There is neither an official Prime Minister/Premier/Colonial Secretary or Finance Minister/Colonial Secretary in the government at this point in time. (see 1st New Zealand Parliament)

- Speaker of the House – When the 1st Parliament opens on 24 May Sir Charles Clifford is unanimously elected as New Zealand's first Speaker of the House.
- Chief Justice – William Martin

== Events ==
- 4 May: The Māori language magazine, The Maori Messenger or Ko te Karere Maori, which started in 1849, stops publishing. In 1855 it will be revived with a different Māori title.
- June: The Canterbury Standard begins publication. The Christchurch newspaper continues until 1866.

== Sport ==
=== Horse racing ===
- 2 December – The Canterbury Jockey Club is formed, the first club of its kind in New Zealand. It holds its first meeting, at Riccarton Racecourse, in 1855.

== Births ==
- 15 February: Peter Webb, rugby union player
- 8 April: George Carter, rugby union player
- 11 May: Westby Perceval, politician (in Tasmania)
- 11 December: James Edward Fulton, civil engineer
- 12 December: Alfred Brandon, Mayor of Wellington.
- (unknown date): William Thomas Wood, politician

== Deaths ==
- April: Robert Fyffe, whaler and runholder
- 5 May: Te Ruki Kawiti, tribal leader
- 23 June: John Deans, Christchurch pioneer
- 19 October: Joseph Zillwood, policeman, farmer and innkeeper

=== Unknown date ===
- Te Aitu-o-te-rangi Jury, tribal founding mother, landowner and farmer
- Ngātata-i-te-rangi, tribal leader

== See also ==
- List of years in New Zealand
- Timeline of New Zealand history
- History of New Zealand
- Military history of New Zealand
- Timeline of the New Zealand environment
- Timeline of New Zealand's links with Antarctica
