= 1843 in New Zealand =

- Decades: 1820s; 1830s; 1840s; 1850s; 1860s
- See also: History of New Zealand; List of years in New Zealand; Timeline of New Zealand history

The following lists events that happened during 1843 in New Zealand.

== Population ==
The estimated population of New Zealand at the end of 1843 is 75,400 Māori and 11,848 non-Māori.

== Incumbents ==
=== Regal and viceregal ===
- Head of State – Queen Victoria
- Governor – Captain Robert Fitzroy arrives to take up the position on 26 December replacing Captain William Hobson who died the previous year.

=== Government and law ===
- Chief Justice – William Martin

=== Main centre leaders ===
- Mayor of Wellington – George Hunter dies on 19 July. The runner-up in the election the previous year, William Guyton, is declared Mayor. News that the Borough of Wellington has been declared illegal by the British Government reaches Wellington in late September. The Borough is abolished as is the office of Mayor. (see also 1842, 1863 & 1870)

== Events ==
- 22 April: The Southern Cross publishes its first issue. The Auckland-based newspaper publishes weekly, with a hiatus in 1845–1847, and from 1862 daily when it will also change its name to The Daily Southern Cross. It will eventually merge with The New Zealand Herald in 1876.
- 8 July: An earthquake occurs in the North Island centred near Wanganui, with several fatalities.
- 2 August: The New Zealand Colonist and Port Nicholson Advertiser ceases publishing after one year.
- 26 August: A riot of armed New Zealand Company workers occurs at the Company office in Nelson, spurred by issues surrounding quality of life and payment of wages. Several are arrested, and many leave for New South Wales as a result.
- 4 November: The Bay of Islands Advocate begins publishing. It runs for three months.

== Births ==
- 10 January Gilbert Mair, soldier

=== Unknown date ===
- (in Scotland): John Blair, Mayor of Wellington.
- (in Ireland): George Fisher, politician.
- (in England): Charles Hall, politician.

== Deaths ==
- 17 June (Wairau Affray):

- William Patchett, early settler
- Arthur Wakefield, founder of Nelson

- 19 July: George Hunter, first Mayor of Wellington (b. 1788)

== See also ==
- History of New Zealand
- List of years in New Zealand
- Military history of New Zealand
- Timeline of New Zealand history
- Timeline of New Zealand's links with Antarctica
- Timeline of the New Zealand environment
