= New Leinster =

Coordinates: 47.00°S 167.84°E

- Subdivision of the Colony of New Zealand
- 1840–1846
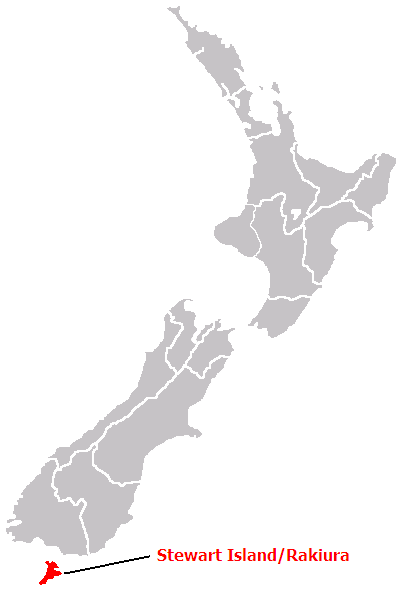
- The location of Stewart Island within New Zealand
- Area
  - 1840: 174,774 km^{2} (67,481 sq mi)
- History
  - Established: 1840
  - Disestablished: 1846
- Contained within
  - Crown colony: Colony of New South Wales (1840–1841); Colony of New Zealand (1841–1846)
| Succeeded by |
| New Munster Province |

New Leinster was a name given to Stewart Island in the royal charter of November 1840, which stated the division of New Zealand into three parts. The division only held a geographic significance. In the New Zealand Constitution Act 1846, the area known as New Leinster was incorporated into the previously established New Munster Province. It was named after Leinster, one of the provinces of Ireland.

== History ==
Following the Treaty of Waitangi, signed on 6 February 1840, New Zealand became a colony of the British Empire, initially administrated as part of the Colony of New South Wales. In the royal charter of November 1840, New Zealand was divided into three divisions: New Ulster, New Munster, and New Leinster. These divisions held geographic but not administrative significance. The names of the regions were created by governor William Hobson, who named them after the corresponding provinces of Ireland, with New Leinster being named after the province of Leinster. The Colony of New Zealand became a crown colony of the British Empire on 3 May 1841.

The New Zealand Constitution Act 1846 divided New Zealand into two provinces, New Ulster, and New Munster, and the area known as New Leinster was then incorporated into the province of New Munster.
