= Colony of New Zealand =

British crown colony (1841–1907)

Coordinates: 41.2889°S 174.7772°E

- 1841–1907
- Top: Flag of New Zealand (since 1902); Bottom: Flag of the United Kingdom (until 1902) Royal coat of arms
- Anthem: "God Save the Queen/King"
- Colony of New Zealand in 1907
- Status: Crown colony (1841–1852); Self-governing colony (1852–1907)
- Capital: Okiato (1841); Auckland (1841–1865); Wellington (since 1865)
- Common languages: English; Māori
- Demonym: New Zealander
- British monarch
  - 1841–1901: Victoria
  - 1901–1907: Edward VII
- Governor
  - 1841–1842: William Hobson (first)
  - 1904–1907: William Plunket (last of colony)
- Premier
  - 1856: Henry Sewell (first)
  - 1906–1907: Joseph Ward (last of colony)
- Legislature: General Assembly^{1}
  - Upper chamber: Legislative Council
  - Lower chamber: House of Representatives
- History
  - Separation from the Colony of New South Wales: 3 May 1841
  - New Zealand Constitution Act 1846: 28 August 1846
  - New Zealand Constitution Act 1852: 30 June 1852
  - Declared as Dominion: 26 September 1907

Population
  - 1901 census: 772,719
- Currency: New Zealand pound
Preceded by	Succeeded by
Colony of New South Wales; United Tribes of New Zealand	Dominion of New Zealand
- 1. The General Assembly first sat in 1854, under the provisions of the New Zealand Constitution Act 1852.

The Colony of New Zealand was a colony of the United Kingdom from 1841 to 1907. British authority was vested in a governor. The colony had three successive capitals: Okiato (or Old Russell) in 1841; Auckland from 1841 to 1865; and Wellington from 1865. Following the New Zealand Constitution Act 1852, the colony became a Crown colony with its first elected parliament in 1853. Responsible self-government was established in 1856 with the governor required to act on the advice of his ministers. In 1907, the colony became the Dominion of New Zealand.

== History ==
=== Establishment ===
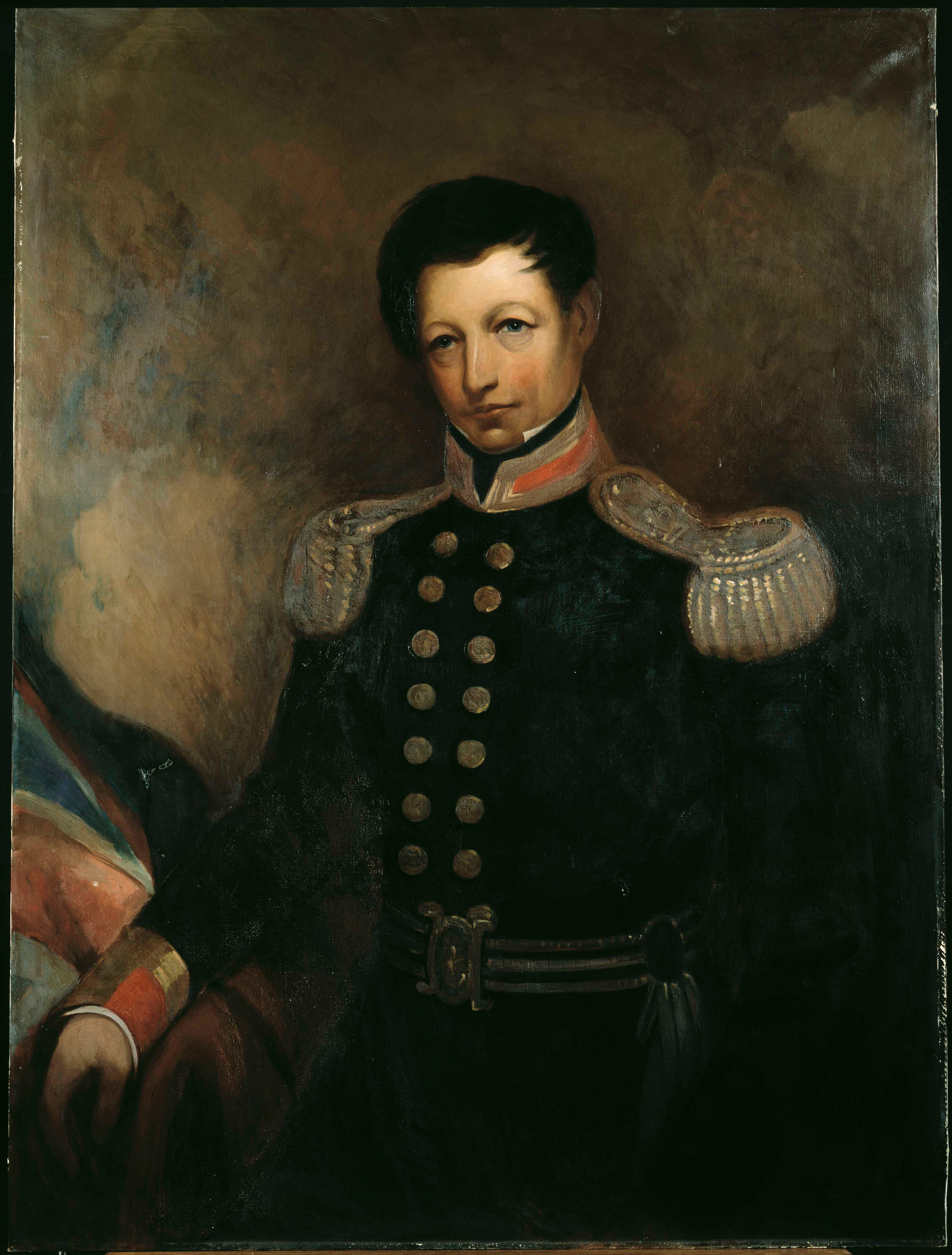
William Hobson, the first Governor of New Zealand and co-author of the Treaty of Waitangi

Following the extension of the boundaries of New South Wales in January 1840 by Governor Gipps to include New Zealand, William Hobson left Sydney for New Zealand.

The Treaty of Waitangi—between Māori chiefs and British representatives of Queen Victoria—was subsequently signed on 6 February 1840. Hobson declared British sovereignty over the islands of New Zealand on 21 May 1840 in two separate declarations. In the first declaration, Hobson declared sovereignty over the North Island on the basis of cession following the Treaty of Waitangi. In the English version of the treaty, Māori ceded sovereignty and received the rights, privileges and protections of being British subjects. The Māori version of the treaty refers to kāwanatanga which is often translated today as governance or government. This point of difference has been a subject of much controversy and political debate. In the second declaration, Hobson declared British sovereignty over the South Island and Stewart Island on the basis of discovery in 1769 by James Cook.

The relationship between New Zealand and the Colony of New South Wales was formalised after a new definition of NSW's boundaries, that included New Zealand, arrived from London on 15 June 1839. It stated that the NSW colony would include "any territory which is or may be acquired in sovereignty by Her Majesty ... within that group of Islands in the Pacific Ocean, commonly called New Zealand." This made Lieutenant-Governor Hobson answerable to his superior, the governor of New South Wales. By letters patent, the British government issued the Charter for Erecting the Colony of New Zealand on 16 November 1840. The Charter stated that the Colony of New Zealand would be established as a de jure Crown colony separate from New South Wales on 3 May 1841.

=== Issue of effective control and sovereignty ===
In its early years, British effective control over the whole colony was limited. Connecting control with sovereignty, the historian James Belich, says sovereignty fell into two categories: nominal (meaning the de jure status of sovereignty, but without the power to govern in practice) and substantive (in which sovereignty can be both legally recognised and widely enforced without competition). He wrote: "Certainly, for many years after 1840, 'nominal sovereignty' was much closer to the reality. This ambiguity was a source of friction. The British imagined that they were entitled to govern the Maoris in fact as well as name, although [William Hobson and Robert FitzRoy] were sufficiently realistic to grasp that substantive sovereignty could not be applied comprehensively overnight."

=== Crown colony ===
With the establishment of the Crown colony, Hobson became governor of New Zealand. The first organs of the New Zealand Government were also established to assist the governor: an Executive Council and a (General) Legislative Council.

The Executive Council consisted of the attorney-general, colonial secretary, and colonial treasurer. The Legislative Council consisted of the governor, Executive Council, and three justices of the peace appointed by the governor. The Legislative Council had the power to issue laws called Ordinances.

The colony was initially divided into three provinces: New Ulster Province (the North Island), New Munster Province (the South Island), and New Leinster Province (Stewart Island).

=== Self-governance ===
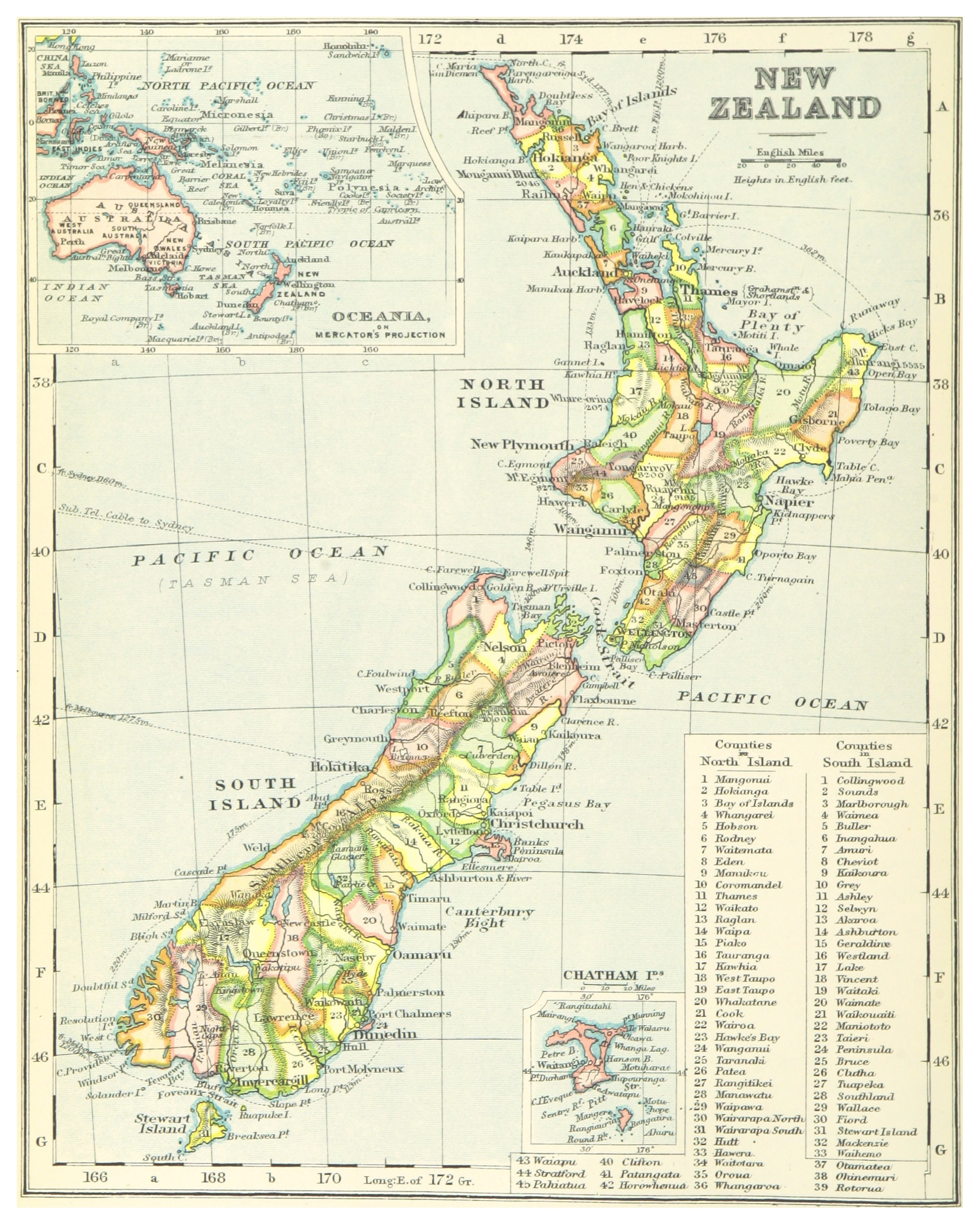
1899 map of the Colony of New Zealand and its counties

As new European settlements were founded in the colony, demands for self-government became louder. The New Zealand Company settlement of Port Nicholson (Wellington) had its own elected council, which was forcibly dissolved by Lieutenant-Governor William Hobson in 1840. Later, Wellington became the centre of agitation by settlers for a representative government led by Samuel Revans, who founded the Wellington Settlers' Constitutional Association in 1848.

The first constitution act was the New Zealand Constitution Act 1846, though Governor George Grey was opposed to provisions that would divide the country into European and Māori districts. As a result, almost all of the act was suspended for six years pending a new New Zealand Constitution Act 1852, with the only operative part of the 1846 act being the creation of New Zealand's first provinces. In the meantime, Grey drafted his own act which established both provincial and central representative assemblies, and allowed for Māori districts and an elected governor. The latter proposal was rejected by the Parliament of the United Kingdom when it adopted Grey's constitution.

The New Zealand Constitution Act 1852 became the central constitutional document of the colony. It created the General Assembly, which consisted of the Legislative Council and an elected House of Representatives. The first general election for the House of Representatives was held from 14 July 1853 until early October.

The 1st New Zealand Parliament was opened on 24 May 1854. The Administrator of Government, Robert Wynyard, was quickly confronted by the demands of the new parliament that responsible government be granted to the colony immediately; on 2 June the House of Representatives passed a resolution, sponsored by Edward Gibbon Wakefield, to that effect. Wynyard refused, stating that the Colonial Office made no mention of responsible government in its dispatches. The Executive Council advised Wynyard against implementing responsible government, and in the meantime, he sent a dispatch to London requesting clarification. Wynyard then offered to add some elected members of parliament to the Executive Council, and appointed James FitzGerald, Henry Sewell and Frederick Weld to the council. The compromise worked for a few weeks but on 1 August parliament demanded complete power to appoint ministers. Wynyard refused, and all three MPs resigned from the council. In response, Wynyard prorogued parliament for two weeks. On 31 August, he appointed Thomas Forsaith, Jerningham Wakefield and James Macandrew to the Executive Council, but when parliament met again, it moved a motion of no confidence in the members.

Parliament met on 8 August 1855, by which time Wynyard had received instructions from the Colonial Office to introduce responsible government. The new governor, Sir Thomas Gore Browne, arrived on 6 September 1855 and relieved Wynyard of his duties. On 28 January 1858, Wynyard was appointed to the Legislative Council.

Governor Thomas Gore Browne subsequently announced that self-government would begin with the 2nd New Zealand Parliament, elected in 1855. Henry Sewell was asked by the governor to form a government, now known as the Sewell Ministry. He became colonial secretary—effectively the first Premier of New Zealand—on 7 May. Sewell's government was short-lived, however. The leader of the provincialist (pro-provinces) faction, William Fox, defeated Sewell's government on 20 May 1856. Fox himself, however, did not retain office for long, being defeated by Edward Stafford, a moderate.

=== Change of status to Dominion ===
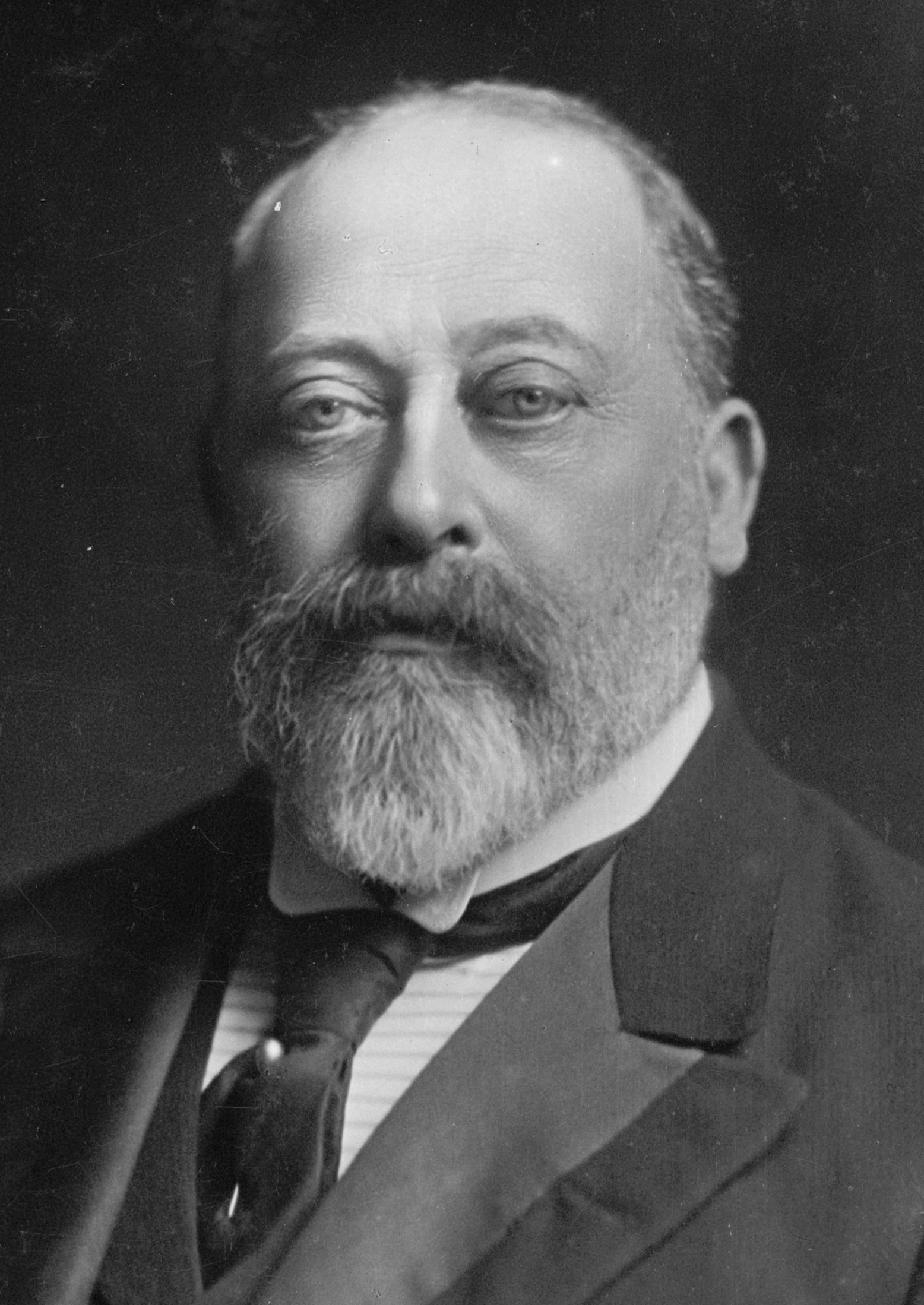
In 1907, Edward VII declared New Zealand to be a Dominion.

The Colony of New Zealand continued until 26 September 1907, when, as a result of a decision by the 1907 Imperial Conference and by request of the New Zealand Government, King Edward VII declared New Zealand to be a Dominion. On the same day, the King issued another Royal Proclamation granting the Colony of Newfoundland the status of Dominion of Newfoundland. The 1907 change from Colony to Dominion was largely symbolic, and New Zealand did not become independent until the General Assembly of New Zealand enacted the Statute of Westminster Adoption Act 1947, which applied the Statute of Westminster 1931 to the Dominion of New Zealand (although the United Kingdom retained the right to legislate for New Zealand at its request); certain colonial enactments survived for sometime after—the New Zealand Constitution Act 1852 was finally replaced by the Constitution Act 1986.

A Royal Proclamation granting New Zealand Dominion status was issued on 26 September 1907.

It read – "Edward R. & I. Whereas We have on the Petition of the Members of the Legislative Council and House of Representatives of Our Colony of New Zealand determined that the title of Dominion of New Zealand shall be substituted for that of the Colony of New Zealand as the designation of the said Colony, We have therefore by and with the advice of Our Privy Council thought fit to issue this Our Royal Proclamation and We do ordain, declare and command that on and after the twenty-sixth day of September, one thousand nine hundred and seven, the said Colony of New Zealand and the territory belonging thereto shall be called and known by the title of the Dominion of New Zealand. And We hereby give Our Commands to all Public Departments accordingly. Given at Our Court at Buckingham Palace, this ninth day of September, in the year of Our Lord one thousand nine hundred and seven, and in the seventh year of Our Reign. God save the King."

== Demography ==
=== Population summary for the census of 1901 ===
Māori were counted separately and not as part of the official census. The total population of the Colony of New Zealand was 772,719 people with the number of "full-blooded" Māori being counted at 43,143 people. The number of "half-castes" living as members of Māori tribes, and others living with and counted as Europeans in the census were counted at 5,540 people.

	Persons	Males	Females
In counties	417,596	231,426	186,170
In boroughs	350,902	170,450	179,752
On adjacent islands	943	589	354
Chatham Islands	207	112	95
Kermadec Islands	8	5	3
Aboard ship	3,763	3,410	353
Total for colony	772,719		

=== Māori population ===
Māori
	People	Males	Females
North Island	40,715	21,919	13,790
Middle Island (South Island)	1,009	1,022	887
Stewart Islands	112	66	46
Chatham Islands			
Māori	180	90	90
Moriori	31	15	16
Māori wives living with European husbands	196		196
Totals	43,143	23,112	20,031

Half-castes living as members of Māori tribes (included in Māori population numbers)
	Persons	Male	Female
North Island	2,517	1,379	1,138
Middle Island (South Island)	551	288	263
Stewart Islands	13	5	8
Chatham Islands			
Māori	34	14	20
Moriori	18	8	10
Totals	3,133	1,694	1,439

Half-castes
	Half-castes living as members of Māori tribes	Half-castes living as Europeans	Total half-caste population
1891	2,681	2,184	4,865
1896	3,503	2,259	5,762
1901	3,133	2,407	5,540

=== Population of principal divisions of New Zealand ===
	Persons	Percentage
North Island and adjacent islands	390,571	
South Island and adjacent islands	381,661	
Stewart Island	272	
Chatham Islands	207	
Kermadec Islands	8	
Totals for colony	772,719	100.0%

=== 1901 population by provincial district ===
District / Settlement	Males	Females	Total	Percent
Auckland	92,944	82,994	175,938	22.77%
Taranaki	20,569	17,286	37,855	4.9%
Hawke's Bay	18,859	16,565	35,424	4.6%
Wellington	74,234	67,120	141,334	18.29%
Marlborough	7,151	6,175	13,326	1.72%
Nelson	20,607	17,308	37,915	4.91%
Westland	8,106	6,400	14,506	1.88%
Canterbury	72,871	70,170	143,041	18.51%
Otago	90,534	82,611	173,145	22.41%
Chatham Islands	112	95	207	0.03%
Kermadec Islands	5	3	8	0.001%
Colony of New Zealand	405,992	366,727	772,719	100.0%
Source: 1901 New Zealand Census

=== Religion in 1901 ===
Religion	Total	Percent
Christianity	748,490	96.97%
Church of England and Protestants (not defined)	315,263	40.84%
Presbyterians	176,503	22.87%
Methodists	83,802	10.86%
Baptists	16,035	2.08%
Congregationalists	6,699	0.87%
Lutherans	4,833	0.63%
Salvation Army	7,999	1.04%
Society of Friends	313	0.04%
Unitarians	468	0.06%
Other Protestants	16,877	2.19%
Roman Catholics and Catholics (undefined)	109,822	14.23%
Greek Church	189	0.02%
Other denominations	1,347	0.17%
No denomination	8,240	1.07%
Hebrews (Jews)	1,611	0.21%
Buddhists, Confucians	2,432	0.30%
No religion	1,109	0.14%
Unspecified	882	Nil
Object to state	18,295	2.38%
Colony of New Zealand	772,719	100.0%

== Flags ==
The first flag used by the Colony of New Zealand was the British Union Flag. This began to change with the Colonial Naval Defence Act 1865, which required all ships owned by colonial governments to fly the defaced Royal Navy Blue Ensign with a colonial badge. New Zealand did not have a colonial badge, or indeed a coat of arms of its own at this stage, and so the letters "NZ" were added to the blue ensign. The Colony New Zealand used the same royal coat of arms as the United Kingdom.

In 1869, Albert Hastings Markham, a first lieutenant on the Royal Navy vessel HMS Blanche, submitted a national ensign design to Sir George Bowen, the Governor of New Zealand. It was initially used only on government ships, but was adopted as the de facto national flag in a surge of patriotism arising from the Second Boer War in 1902. To end confusion between the various designs of the flag, the Liberal Government passed the Ensign and Code Signals Bill, which was approved by King Edward VII on 24 March 1902, declaring the flag as New Zealand's national flag.

The Union Flag was used exclusively until 1867.

The naval flag of New Zealand, 1867–1869

The national flag 1869, formally adopted in 1902

== See also ==
- History of New Zealand
- Political history of New Zealand
- List of governors of New Zealand
