= 1844 in New Zealand =

- Decades: 1820s; 1830s; 1840s; 1850s; 1860s
- See also: History of New Zealand; List of years in New Zealand; Timeline of New Zealand history

The following lists events that happened during 1844 in New Zealand.

== Population ==
The estimated population of New Zealand at the end of 1844 is 73,900 Māori and 12,447 non-Māori.

== Incumbents ==
=== Regal and viceregal ===
- Head of State – Queen Victoria
- Governor – Captain Robert Fitzroy

=== Government and law ===
- Chief Justice – William Martin

== Events ==
- 26 January: Governor Robert FitzRoy arrives in Wellington to investigate the Wairau Affray.
- February: The Bay of Islands Advocate ceases publishing. It began in 1843.
- 25 September: The New Zealand Gazette and Wellington Spectator prints its final issue. 369 issues were produced.
- 12 October: The New Zealand Spectator and Cook's Strait Guardian begins publishing in Wellington. It publishes weekly until its demise in 1865.

== Births ==
=== Unknown date ===
- (in Ireland): James Colvin, politician.
- John Sheehan, politician.

== Deaths ==
- 10 October: Tūhawaiki, tribal leader

=== Unknown date ===
- Te Pareihe, tribal leader

== See also ==
- List of years in New Zealand
- Timeline of New Zealand history
- History of New Zealand
- Military history of New Zealand
- Timeline of the New Zealand environment
- Timeline of New Zealand's links with Antarctica
