= Tōpia Peehi Tūroa =

New Zealand Māori leader (died 1903)

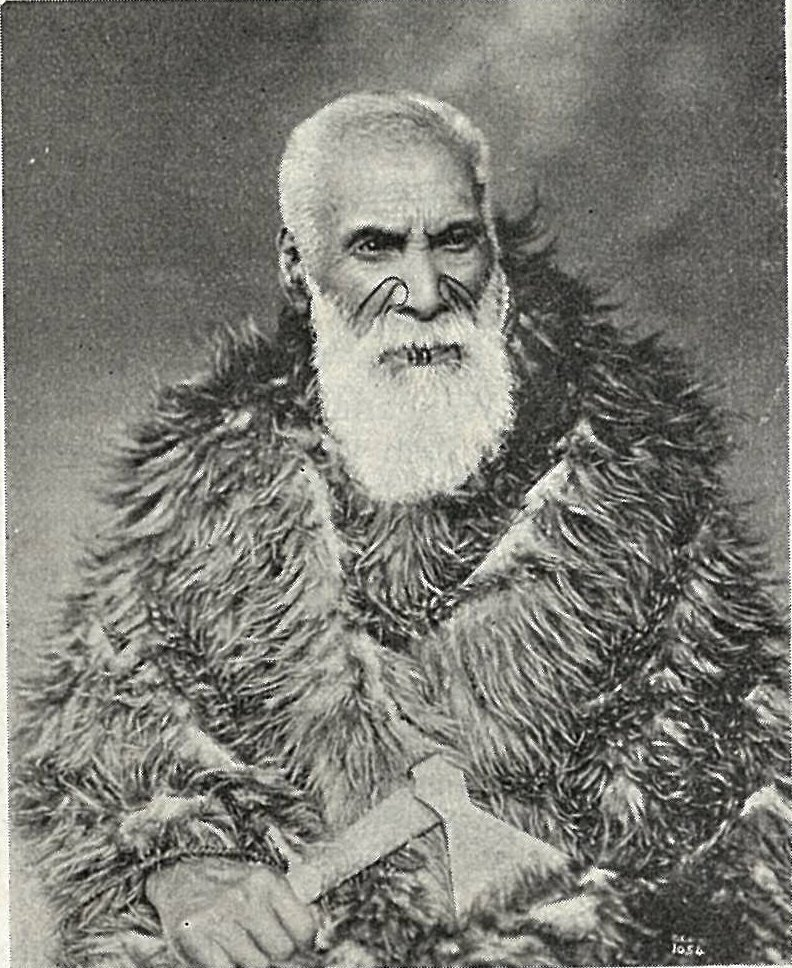

Tōpia Peehi Tūroa (died 1903) was a notable New Zealand tribal leader. Of Māori descent, he identified with the Te Ati Haunui-a-Paparangi iwi. He was the grandson of Te Peehi Turoa.
