= Wiremu Hikairo =

Wiremu Hikairo (c. 1780/90 – 28 October 1851) was a New Zealand tribal leader and peacemaker. Of Māori descent, he identified with the Ngāti Rangiwewehi iwi. He was born in Puhirua or Te Awahou, on the northern shore of Lake Rotorua, New Zealand.
