= George Binns =

New Zealand chartist leader and poet (1815–1847)

George Binns (6 December 1815 – 5 April 1847) was a New Zealand chartist leader and poet. He was born in Sunderland, England on 6 December 1815.
