= New Zealand Constitution Act 1846 =

Act of the Parliament of the United Kingdom

- Act of Parliament
- Parliament of the United Kingdom
- Long title: An Act to make further Provision for the Government of the New Zealand Islands.
- Citation: 9 & 10 Vict. c. 103
- Territorial extent: United Kingdom

Dates
- Royal assent: 28 August 1846
- Commencement: 28 August 1846 (Note: The Acts of Parliament (Commencement) Act 1793.)
- Repealed: 5 August 1891
Other legislation
Amended by	Government of New Zealand Act 1848; Statute Law Revision Act 1875
Repealed by	Statute Law Revision Act 1891
Relates to	New Zealand Constitution Act 1852

Status: Repealed

Text of statute as originally enacted

The New Zealand Constitution Act 1846 (9 & 10 Vict. c. 103) was an act of the Parliament of the United Kingdom that was intended to grant self-government to the Colony of New Zealand, but was never fully implemented. The act's long title was "An Act to make further Provision for the Government of the New Zealand Islands". It received royal assent on 28 August 1846.

The act formally remained part of New Zealand's constitution until it was replaced by the New Zealand Constitution Act 1852 (15 & 16 Vict. c. 72).

== Background ==
=== The Charter of 1840 ===
Prior to the act, the basic document setting out the governance of New Zealand since the signing of the Treaty of Waitangi was the Charter of 1840, which specified:

- The three principal islands of New Zealand were to be known as New Ulster, New Munster, and New Leinster.
- The Governor was to summon an Executive Council to advise and assist him. This council comprised the Colonial Secretary, the Attorney-General, and the Treasurer.
- A Legislative Council of seven people – the Governor, the members of the Executive Council, and three nominated justices of the peace – was to make laws and ordinances "for the peace, order, and good government" of the colony.

The Executive and Legislative Councils met infrequently during the governorships of William Hobson and his successors, Willoughby Shortland (as Administrator), Robert FitzRoy and Sir George Grey. Throughout the Crown colony period each governor held, in the name of the Crown, complete control over the executive and legislative functions of government.

=== Settler demands for representative government ===
There was a growing agitation from the settlers for representative government. This was particularly the case in Wellington which, as a New Zealand Company settlement, briefly had its own independent governing council, until Governor Hobson sent his Colonial Secretary, Willoughby Shortland, and some soldiers to Port Nicholson to end any challenge to British sovereignty (the colonists had set up a "colonial council", which Hobson described as a "republic", in March 1840 headed by William Wakefield).

The people of Auckland, then the capital, were less interested. Eventually, pressure led to the enactment in 1846 in London of an intricate constitution.

== Effect ==
The Act provided for a three-tiered system of representative government:

- Municipal corporations were to be created with the powers of English boroughs;
- Two provinces were to be established with assemblies that would include a Governor, a nominated Legislative Council, and a House of Representatives elected by the mayor and councillors of the municipalities in the province;
- A General Assembly for the whole colony consisting of a Governor-in-Chief, a nominated Legislative Council, and a House of Representatives appointed by the houses of the provinces from their own members.

The Act was intended to be implemented by a royal charter and royal instructions, issued on 23 December 1846.

== Suspension ==
Governor of New Zealand George Grey argued that the Constitution Act would place the Māori majority under the political control of the settlers, and so undermine his efforts to protect Māori interests. In a dispatch to the colonial secretary Earl Grey, Governor Grey stated that in implementing the Act, Her Majesty would not be giving the self-government that was intended, instead:

...she will give to a small fraction of her subjects of one race the power of governing the large majority of her subjects of a different race... there is no reason to think that they would be satisfied with, and submit to, the rule of a minority

In 1848 (just before Governor Grey created two provinces, New Ulster and New Munster) the British Parliament passed the Government of New Zealand Act 1848 (11 & 12 Vict. c. 5) under which parts of the 1846 act dealing with establishment of provincial assemblies and the General Assembly were not to come into force for another five years.

The Charter provisions relating to the Legislative Council for the whole colony continued and the Governor was authorised to establish Legislative Councils in each of the provinces. However, settler pressure for representative institutions and criticism of Grey intensified, and for the next four years the Governor pursued a course that gave little satisfaction to the settlers.

Early in 1848 he had appointed Major-General Pitt (he was followed by Lieutenant-Colonel Robert Henry Wynyard) as Lieutenant-Governor of New Ulster, and Edward John Eyre as Lieutenant-Governor of New Munster. Each had associated with him an Executive Council. Later in the same year Grey, through an Ordinance of the General Legislative Council, established nominated Legislative Councils in each province. The Provincial Council of New Ulster was never summoned. In 1851, under the authority of the 1846 Act, Grey made the town of Auckland a municipality, but this step did not relieve the pressure for a Legislative Council which would be representative of the whole province.

The Provincial Council of New Munster had only one legislative session – in 1849 – before it succumbed to the virulent attacks of the Wellington settlers. Grey, sensible to the pressures, inspired an ordinance of the General Legislative Council under which new Legislative Councils would be established in each province with two-thirds of their members elected on a generous franchise. Grey, however, proceeded to implement the ordinance with such deliberation that neither Council met before advice was received that the Parliament at Westminster had passed the New Zealand Constitution Act 1852 (15 & 16 Vict. c. 72)).

== Subsequent developments ==
The whole act was repealed by section 1 of, and the first schedule to, the Statute Law Revision Act 1891 (54 & 55 Vict. c. 67), which came into force on 5 August 1891.

== Bibliography ==
- Moon, Paul (2010). New Zealand Birth Certificates: 50 of New Zealand's Founding Documents. ISBN 9780958299718.
- Quentin-Baxter, Alison; McLean, Janet (2017). This Realm of New Zealand: The Sovereign, the Governor-General, the Crown. Auckland University Press. ISBN 978-1-869-40875-6.
