= Te Peehi Turoa =

New Zealand Māori leader (died 1845)

Te Peehi Turoa (? – 8 September 1845) was a notable New Zealand tribal leader, warrior and composer of waiata. Of Māori descent, he identified with the Te Ati Haunui-a-Paparangi iwi. Tōpia Peehi Tūroa was his grandson.
