= Samuel Martin (writer) =

Land claimant, magistrate, journalist, writer

Samuel McDonald Martin (c.1803 – 22 September 1848) was a New Zealand land claimant, medical doctor, magistrate, journalist and writer. He was born in Kilmuir, Skye, Scotland in c.1803. He was opposed to the policies of Governor William Hobson. He died in British Guiana where he had been appointed a magistrate.
