= Arthur Edward McDonogh =

- Born: 1810; Ireland
- Died: 26 October 1852 (aged 41–42)
- Occupations: policeman, police magistrate

Arthur Edward McDonogh (c.1810 – 26 October 1852) was a New Zealand policeman, police magistrate, militia officer and roading supervisor. He was born in Ireland in c.1810.
