= Lieutenant governor =

General title for high officer of state

A lieutenant governor, lieutenant-governor, or vice governor is a high officer of state, whose exact role and rank vary by jurisdiction. Often a lieutenant governor is the deputy, or lieutenant, to or ranked under a governor — a "second-in-command", rather like deputy governor. In Canadian provinces and in the Dutch Caribbean, the lieutenant governor is the representative of the Canadian monarch or Dutch monarch in that jurisdiction, and thus outranks the head of government, but for practical purposes has virtually no power.

In India, lieutenant governors are in charge of union territories in that country.

In the United States, lieutenant governors are usually second-in-command to a state governor, and the actual power held by the lieutenant governor varies greatly from state to state. The lieutenant governor is often first in line of succession to the governorship, and acts as governor when the governor leaves the state or is unable to serve. Also, the lieutenant governor is often the president of the state senate.

In Argentina, lieutenant governors are called "vice governors" and are modeled after the U.S. lieutenant governors, since as their U.S. counterpart the vice governors are the second-in-command to a provincial governor, and are the first in the gubernatorial line of succession. Also, the vice governor usually acts as the president of the provincial senate (or the provincial legislature in unicameral provinces).

== Lieutenant governors in the former British Empire ==
- Australia – Lieutenant-Governor (Australia)
  - Lieutenant-Governor of New South Wales
  - Lieutenant-Governor of Queensland
  - Lieutenant-Governor of Victoria
- Canada – Lieutenant Governor (Canada)
  - Lieutenant Governor of Alberta
  - Lieutenant Governor of British Columbia
  - Lieutenant Governor of Manitoba
  - Lieutenant Governor of New Brunswick
  - Lieutenant Governor of Newfoundland and Labrador
  - Lieutenant Governor of Nova Scotia
  - Lieutenant Governor of Ontario
  - Lieutenant Governor of Prince Edward Island
  - Lieutenant Governor of Quebec
  - Lieutenant Governor of Saskatchewan
- British Crown Dependencies and other possessions
  - Guernsey – Lieutenant Governor of Guernsey
  - Isle of Man – Lieutenant Governor of the Isle of Man
  - Jersey – Lieutenant Governor of Jersey
  - Hong Kong (historical) – Lieutenant Governor of Hong Kong (1843–1902)
  - Indonesia (historical) – Lieutenant-Governor of Java (1811–1814)
- India – lieutenant governors and administrators
  - List of current Indian lieutenant governors and administrators
    - List of lieutenant governors of the Andaman and Nicobar Islands
    - List of lieutenant governors of Delhi
    - List of lieutenant governors of Jammu and Kashmir
    - List of lieutenant governors of Ladakh
    - List of lieutenant governors of Puducherry
- New Zealand – The only person to have held the rank of Lieutenant Governor of New Zealand was Royal Navy Captain William Hobson from 1839 to 1841 when New Zealand colony was a dependency of the colony of New South Wales, governed at that time by Sir George Gipps. When New Zealand was designated a Crown colony in 1841, Hobson was raised to the rank of governor, which he held until his death the following year. Subsequently, in 1848 New Zealand was divided into three provinces: New Ulster, New Munster, and New Leinster, each with their own Lieutenant Governors.
- Nigeria - known as Deputy Governor
- U.S. states – Lieutenant governor (United States)
  - List of current United States lieutenant governors
  - Colonial government in the Thirteen Colonies#The Council

== Lieutenant governors in the Kingdom of the Netherlands ==
The Netherlands has lieutenant governors (Dutch: gezaghebbers) who formerly and currently govern the Netherlands' island territories. Before the dissolution of the Netherlands Antilles in 2010, each island territory of the Netherlands Antilles had a lieutenant governor who served as heads of the governing council of each island territory, which formed a level of decentralized government. Currently, the Netherlands has three lieutenant governors who each oversee one of the three special municipalities in the Caribbean Netherlands: Saba, Bonaire, and Sint Eustatius. These lieutenant governors are referred to locally as Island Governor, and their function is similar to a mayor in the European Netherlands.

== See also ==
- Acting governor
- Administrator of the government
- Deputy governor
- Governor-general
- Governor-in-chief
- Lieutenant Governor's Court
- Regent
- Vice president
