= Albert Moss (cricketer) =

New Zealand cricketer

Personal information
- Full name: Albert Edward Moss
- Born: 3 October 1863; Hugglescote, Leicestershire, England
- Died: 12 December 1945 (aged 82); Hadleigh, Essex, England
- Bowling: Right-arm fast

Career statistics
Competition	First-class
Matches	4
Runs scored	13
Batting average	2.60
100s/50s	0/0
Top score	8
Balls bowled	1,024
Wickets	26
Bowling average	10.96
5 wickets in innings	2
10 wickets in match	1
Best bowling	10-28
Catches/stumpings	6/0
- Source: CricketArchive

Albert Edward Moss (3 October 1863 – 11 December 1945) was a cricketer: a fast bowler who had a short first-class career of just four games, all in 1889–90, but who nevertheless holds a unique record: he is the only man to have taken all ten wickets in an innings in an 11-a-side match on his first-class debut.

== Life and career ==
Albert Moss was born in Hugglescote, Coalville, in Leicestershire, where his family lived at 32 Station Street. Moss moved to New Zealand after his father succumbed to tuberculosis, hoping to avoid sharing his fate.

Writing of the period before the First World War, the New Zealand cricket historian Tom Reese described Moss as "probably the fastest bowler ever seen on a New Zealand side". He made his debut for Canterbury against Wellington at Christchurch on 27 December 1889, and the following day took 10–28 in 21.3 six-ball overs as Wellington were dismissed for 71; he also claimed three wickets in the second innings as Canterbury won by 33 runs. His first-innings achievement remains (as of 2020) the only instance of ten wickets in an innings in New Zealand. Moss took great pride in his achievement, especially as the ball was mounted with a plaque and presented to him by his cricket club, Lancaster Park C.C.

He took thirteen wickets in his next three matches between January and March 1890, and shortly afterwards stood for the only time as an umpire. However, Moss was tried in the Supreme Court, Christchurch, in August 1891, for wounding his wife with intent to murder. He was found not guilty on the grounds of insanity and remanded to Lyttelton Prison, "till the pleasure of the Colonial Secretary is known". He was released in early 1896 on condition that he did not contact his wife again and was deported to Rio de Janeiro. Hoping to redeem himself, he went from South America to South Africa, working for the Salvation Army in Pretoria. By chance, his wife read an article about his work in the Salvation Army magazine, The War Cry, and, after returning the commemorative ball to him, herself went to South Africa and remarried him.

The couple returned to England in 1918, living in Essex. Mary died in 1928, and Moss died at their house in 1945 at the age of 82. The ball was given to Lancaster Park, the home of the Canterbury club. It is now looked after by the Salvation Army, but an agreement has been made for it to be displayed on special occasions.
