= Provinces of New Zealand =

Divisions of the Crown colony in the Pacific Ocean

Provinces
- Also known as: Provincial Districts
- Provinces in 1858
- Category: Provinces
- Location: Colony of New Zealand
- Created: 1846
- Abolished: 1 November 1876

The provinces of the Colony of New Zealand existed as a form of sub-national government. Initially established in 1846 when New Zealand was a Crown colony without responsible government, two provinces (New Ulster and New Munster) were first created. Each province had its own legislative council and governor. With the passing of the New Zealand Constitution Act 1852 the provinces were recreated around the six planned settlements or "colonies". By 1873 the number of provinces had increased to nine, but they had become less isolated from each other and demands for centralised government arose. In 1875 the New Zealand Parliament decided to abolish the provincial governments, and they came to an end in November 1876. They were superseded by counties, which were later replaced by territorial authorities.

Following abolition, the provinces became known as provincial districts. Their principal legacy is the use of some provincial boundaries to determine the geographical boundaries for anniversary day public holidays.

== Crown Colony: 1841–1853 ==
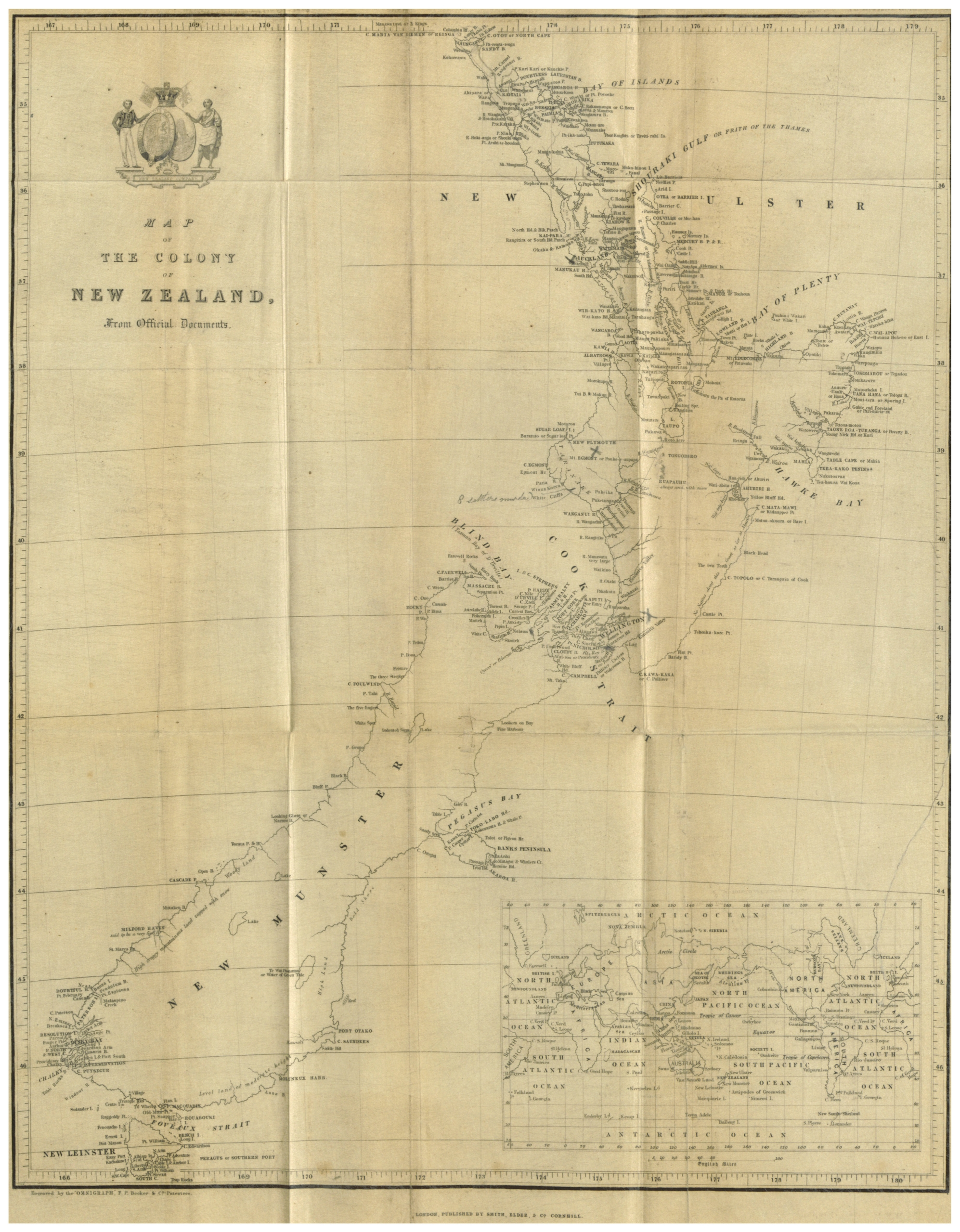
Map of the Colony of New Zealand in 1842, naming the North Island "New Ulster", South Island "New Munster" and Stewart Island "New Leinster."

Following the Treaty of Waitangi in 1840, New Zealand became a British colony, initially as part of New South Wales.

The Royal Charter of November 1840 stated that the islands of New Zealand were "designated and known respectively" as:

- New Ulster (the North Island)
- New Munster (the South Island)
- New Leinster (Stewart Island)

These names were of geographic significance only. New Zealand became a Crown Colony in May 1841, separate from New South Wales.

In 1846 the British Parliament passed the first New Zealand Constitution Act, which allowed for the establishment of provinces. Governor George Grey arrived in New Zealand in November 1845, and upon reading the new Constitution Act in May 1847 argued for its suspension in dispatches to the Colonial Office. Before this occurred, Grey proclaimed the provincial boundaries on 10 March 1848:

- New Ulster (the North Island, north of the Patea River mouth)
- New Munster (the North Island south of the Patea River mouth, the South Island and Stewart Island)

Each province had a Lieutenant-Governor, appointed by the Governor-in-Chief.

The 1846 Constitution Act was suspended in early 1848, with the only operative provisions relating to the reform of the provinces. News of the suspension did not reach New Zealand until 23 March 1848, when the immigrant ship John Wickliffe arrived in Port Chalmers to begin European settlement of Otago.

In addition, the provinces were separated from the central government for the first time.

New Ulster and New Munster had their own seals.

== Responsible Government: 1853–1876 ==
Map of the provinces in 1853

New provinces were formed by the New Zealand Constitution Act 1852. This act established a quasi-federal system of government and divided the country into the six provinces of Auckland, New Plymouth, Wellington, Nelson, Canterbury, and Otago. Each province elected its own legislature, known as a provincial council, and elected a superintendent who was not a member of the council. Each council elected a speaker at their first meeting after an election.

The Constitution Act also created a national General Assembly consisting of the Legislative Council (appointed by the governor) and the directly elected House of Representatives. The provinces came into being on 17 January 1853 and the regulations defining the boundaries of the provinces were gazetted on 28 February. Electoral regulations were gazetted on 5 March. As with general elections, elections were open to males 21 years or older who owned freehold property worth £50 a year. The first provincial elections were held at the same time as the 1853 general elections. While Governor George Grey had issued the writs for the provincial and general elections at the same time, the provincial councils met before the general assembly met, in May 1854.

The New Zealand Constitution Amendment Act 1857 provided for the appointment of a deputy superintendent.

=== New Provinces Act 1858 ===
The provinces in 1861

The Constitution Act provided for the creation of additional provinces, and when the spread of European settlements between the original centres of the provincial governments and the outlying settlers grew, the General Assembly passed the New Provinces Act 1858. This act allowed any district of between 500 thousand and 3 million acres (2,000–12,000 km^{2}) of land with a European population of no fewer than 1,000 people to petition for separation provided that at least 60% of electors agreed. Hawke's Bay Province split off from Wellington on 1 November 1858, Marlborough Province from Nelson on 1 November 1859, and Southland Province from Otago on 1 April 1861. New Plymouth changed its name to Taranaki under the same act. Stewart Island, which had since 1853 not been part of any province, was annexed to the province of Southland on 10 November 1863.

Provinces established under this act elected their superintendents in a different way. Members of the provincial council would elect a suitable person listed on the electoral roll as superintendent by a majority. If such a person was an elected member, this would result in a by-election to fill the vacancy.

Province	Formed from	Date formed	Date dissolved
Auckland	New Ulster	17 January 1853	1 November 1876
New Plymouth (Note: Renamed Taranaki from 1 January 1859)	New Ulster	17 January 1853	1 November 1876
Hawke's Bay	Wellington	1 November 1858	1 November 1876
Wellington	New Munster	17 January 1853	1 November 1876
Nelson	New Munster	17 January 1853	1 November 1876
Marlborough	Nelson	1 November 1859	1 November 1876
Westland	Canterbury	1 December 1873 (Note: Independent county 1 January 1868)	1 November 1876
Canterbury	New Munster	17 January 1853	1 November 1876
Otago	New Munster	17 January 1853	1 November 1876
Southland	Otago	25 March 1861	5 October 1870 (Note: Reunited with Otago)

=== Abolition of Provinces Act 1875 ===
The provinces have broken down because of their coming into conflict with the colonial government on many points, and especially on points of finance. Their doom was only a question of time, when it became obvious that they could not raise their own revenue; that they had to look to the general government to supply deficiencies; and that they could not borrow without the colony becoming liable.

— Colonial Treasurer Julius Vogel, 1876

Map of provinces at the time of their abolition. These units were later renamed "provincial districts".

The provinces were the subject of protracted political debate almost as soon as they were founded. Two factions emerged in the General Assembly: "Centralists", favouring a strong central government, and "Provincialists", favouring strong regional governments. The Centralist members of the General Assembly regarded the provinces as inherently self-interested, and prone to pork-barrel politics. In the construction of railways, for example, three of the provinces had constructed railways (as was the case in Australia) to different track gauges, with Canterbury Provincial Railways being built to "broad" gauge, and Southland's railways being built to "standard" gauge. As a result, the Public Works Act 1870 standardised the gauge to be used, and Otago's first railway, the Port Chalmers railway, was built to the new "standard" narrow gauge. Colonial Treasurer (and later Premier) Julius Vogel launched his Great Public Works policy of immigration and public works schemes of the 1870s, borrowing the massive sum of 10 million pounds, to develop significant infrastructure of roads, railways, and communications, all administered by the central government. This diminished the power of the provinces greatly. The provinces were finally abolished by the Abolition of Provinces Act 1875, during the premiership of Harry Atkinson. The act came into force on 1 November 1876, but the superintendents stayed in office until the replacement county councils took office on 1 January 1877.

== Replacement ==
Upon abolition, the provinces took the legal status of provincial districts that had no administrative functions. Local government was vested in elected borough and county councils. The Counties Bill of 1876 created 63 counties out of the provinces. In 1989 the counties were replaced by enlarged district councils.

The boundaries of the former provinces served as administrative areas for education boards set up under the Education Act of 1877 and for the offices of several Government departments, including the Department of Lands and Survey. Various responsibilities were delegated to boards. For example, the Education Act 1877 created the Education Boards for Auckland, Hamilton, Hawkes Bay, Taranaki, Wanganui, Wellington, Nelson, Westland, Southland, Canterbury and Otago districts. The Department of Lands and Survey split the country into the Land Districts of Auckland (North), Auckland (South), Hawkes Bay, Gisborne, Taranaki, Wellington, Canterbury, Marlborough, Nelson, Westland, Otago and Southland.

The New Zealand Rugby Union was formed in 1892 with foundation members principally being provinces: Auckland†, Hawke's Bay†, Taranaki†, Manawatu, Wanganui, Wairarapa, Wellington†, Nelson†, Marlborough† and South Canterbury. At the time, three major South Island Provincial Unions – Canterbury†, Otago† and Southland† – resisted the central authority of the NZRU.

== Modern uses of the old names ==
Some current Provincial Anniversary Days are still public holidays in New Zealand: Auckland†, Taranaki†, Hawkes' Bay†, Wellington†, Marlborough†, Nelson†, Canterbury†, Canterbury (South), Westland†, Otago†, Southland† and Chatham Islands.

The provincial districts had different boundaries from the present day regions, for example, the Manawatū-Whanganui region is largely in the Wellington provincial district. The districts are represented by teams in rugby union's ITM Cup and Heartland Championship, both of which replaced the National Provincial Championship in 2006, although the term "provincial" is still used in connection with rugby for the present 29 unions whether founded in the 1880s (e.g. Otago) or 2006 (Tasman).

Some of the names persist in other contexts as well, such as health administration districts: Northland, Waitemata, Auckland†, Counties Manukau, Waikato, Bay of Plenty, Lakes (Rotorua/Taupo), Hawke's Bay†, MidCentral (Manawatu), Tairawhiti (Gisborne), Taranaki, Whanganui, Wairarapa, Hutt Valley, Capital and Coast (Wellington)†, Nelson (Marlborough)†, West Coast†, Canterbury†, South Canterbury and Southern (Otago)†.

Some of the names of former provinces and current regions have a tendency to be preceded by "the". Thus, for example, we have Auckland, Canterbury, Hawke's Bay, Marlborough and Wellington, but the Waikato, the Manawatu, the Bay of Plenty, and the West Coast.

The current regions of New Zealand and most of their councils came about in 1989: Northland, Auckland†, Waikato, Bay of Plenty, Gisborne, Hawke's Bay†, Taranaki†, Manawatu-Whanganui, Wellington†, Tasman, Nelson†, Marlborough†, West Coast†, Canterbury†, Otago† and Southland†.

Another usage of words associated with the former provinces often refers to anything rural, e.g. one may refer to a town as provincial rather than rural or use the phrase 'out in the provinces,' in order to refer to the countryside. These terms can often be heard on national television networks, particularly on weather broadcasts.

† indicates a former province.
