= New Zealand Constitution Act 1852 =

UK law granting self-government to New Zealand

New Zealand Constitution Act 1852 (Note: The citation of this act by this short title was authorised by section 1 of, and the first schedule to, the Short Titles Act 1896. Due to the repeal of those provisions it is now authorised by section 19(2) of the Interpretation Act 1978.)
- Act of Parliament
- Parliament of the United Kingdom
- Long title: An Act to grant a Representative Constitution to the Colony of New Zealand.
- Citation: 15 & 16 Vict. c. 72
- Territorial extent: United Kingdom; New Zealand; (Note: Section 81.)

Dates
- Royal assent: 30 June 1852
- Commencement: 17 January 1853
- Repealed: New Zealand: 1 January 1987; United Kingdom: 16 November 1989
Other legislation
Amended by	New Zealand Constitution (Amendment) Act 1857; New Zealand Boundaries Act 1863
Repealed by	New Zealand: Constitution Act 1986; United Kingdom: Statute Law (Repeals) Act 1989

Status: Repealed

Text of statute as originally enacted

The New Zealand Constitution Act 1852 (15 & 16 Vict. c. 72) was an act of the Parliament of the United Kingdom that granted self-government to the Colony of New Zealand. It was the second such act, the New Zealand Constitution Act 1846 (9 & 10 Vict. c. 103) not having been fully implemented. The purpose of the act was to have constitutional independence from Britain. The definition of franchise or the ability to vote excluded all women, most Māori, all non-British people and those with convictions for serious offences.

The act took effect upon proclamation by Governor George Grey on 17 January 1853. It remained in force as part of New Zealand's constitution until it was rendered ineffective by the Constitution Act 1986.

The long title of the act was "An Act to Grant a Representative Constitution to the Colony of New Zealand". The act received royal assent on 30 June 1852.

== Background ==
In 1850, New Zealand was being governed as a Crown colony. This style of government was increasingly inadequate in light of changing circumstances. The rapid demographic changes as new immigrants arrived meant a new, democratic style of government had to be established to replace the dictatorial Crown colony system.

The New Zealand Company, which was established in 1839, proposed that New Zealand should have representative institutions, and this was consistent with the findings of the Durham Report, which was commissioned during 1838 following the rebellions in Upper and Lower Canada. The company's first settlement, Wellington, briefly had its own elected council during 1840, which dissolved itself on the instruction of Lieutenant Governor William Hobson. The first constitution statute was the New Zealand Constitution Act 1846, though Governor George Grey was opposed to its implementation, specifically the proposed division of the country into European and Māori districts, and stated that settlers were not ready for self-government. As a result, almost all of the act was suspended for six years pending the New Zealand Constitution Act 1852, the only operative part of the New Zealand Constitution Act 1846 being the creation of New Zealand's first provinces, New Ulster Province and New Munster Province. In the meantime, Grey drafted his own Constitution Act while camping on Mount Ruapehu. Grey's draft established both provincial and central representative assemblies, allowed for Māori districts and a governor elected by the General Assembly. Only the latter proposal was rejected by the Parliament of the United Kingdom when it adopted Grey's constitution.

== Effect ==
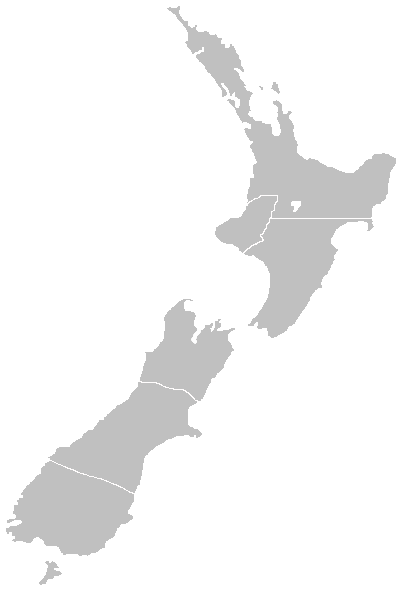
The 1852 Constitution Act established the Provinces of New Zealand.

The constitution established:

- The bicameral General Assembly (often referred to as Parliament, but not officially so called until 1986), consisting of the governor, a legislative council and a House of Representatives;
- The Executive Council, nominally appointed by the governor. This issue was to dominate the first session of Parliament in 1854;
- The Provinces of New Zealand, which divided New Zealand into six provinces.

By the act, the provinces had the authority to pass provincial legislation, although the governor had a reserve power of veto such legislation, and the right of the Crown to disallow provincial acts within two years of their passage was preserved. Parliament was granted the power to make laws for the "peace, order, and good government of New Zealand" provided such legislation was not inconsistent with the laws of England.

== Sections ==
The Constitution Act consisted of 82 sections as passed, a preamble and one schedule.

=== Preamble ===
The Constitution Act's preamble recounts the previous enactments, including the New Zealand Constitution Act 1846 (9 & 10 Vict. c. 103), charters and letters patent passed and issued in the creation of the Colony of New Zealand.

=== Repeals ===
The Constitution Act repealed all enactments that were repugnant to the Constitution Act but preserved all ordinances of the then established provinces of New Zealand.

=== Provinces ===
Sections 2 to 28 dealt with the Provinces of New Zealand, setting out their establishment, composition, elections, powers and procedures. Each province was to have a Superintendent and a Provincial Council. Each Provincial Council consisted of no less than nine members, elected by men over the age of 21 years, owning freehold estate, living in the district and with a £50 or above income per annum. Since Māori land was owned collectively not on individual title as was required, most Māori could not vote.

Superintendents were elected directly at the same time as Provincial Councils.

Provinces were able to make laws (ordinances) in all areas, except for:

- Setting customs duties
- Creating courts except where allowed under New Zealand law
- The issuing of bills (debentures), coins or paper currency
- Weights and measures
- Post-offices and postal services
- Bankruptcy or insolvency:
- Beacons and lighthouses on the coast
- Charges on shipping at any port
- Marriage
- Lands of the Crown, or lands to which the "title of the aboriginal native owners" (Māori) has not been "extinguished" (that is, sold)
- "Inflicting any disabilities or restrictions" on Māori (described as "the native race") to which "persons of European birth or descent" would not also be subject to
- Criminal law, except trial and punishment
- Wills and inheritance

Provincial councils could sit for no more than four years.

=== Local government ===
The Constitution allowed for the creation of municipal corporations, i.e., city governments. Municipal corporations could create their own regulations and by-laws but could be overruled by the provincial council in the province the corporation was established in. The constitution did not define how the municipal corporations would be elected, but left it to the General Assembly to determine.

=== Māori districts ===
"Māori districts" were allowed for under the Constitution Act, where Māori law and custom were to be preserved, but this section was never implemented by the Crown. It was, however, used by the Kingitanga to justify claims of Māori self-governance during the 1870s and 1880s.

=== General Assembly ===
A General Assembly was constituted, consisting of the governor, the Legislative Council, and the House of Representatives. The Legislative Council was an appointed body of no less than ten councillors (with a quorum of five), who were at least 21 years old and British subjects. Legislative Councillors held their seats for life, unless they resigned, or were bankrupted or swore allegiance to a foreign power.

=== Assent to bills ===
The constitution stated the governor was empowered to grant, refuse and reserve assent to bills passed by the General Assembly. The governor could also return bills to the General Assembly with suggested amendments. The sovereign could instruct the governor to refuse assent to bills.

The governor was required to send bills assented to one of the sovereign's principal secretaries of state. The sovereign could then, by Order in Council, refuse assent to bills. If the governor reserved assent to a bill, it could only be assented to by the sovereign.

=== New Zealand Company ===
The constitution provided for the Crown to control the sale of "wastelands", land that was previously purchased (or claimed to be purchased) by the New Zealand Company from Māori for the company's colonisation schemes. The British government had lent £236,000 to the company in 1846 to keep the company solvent. As a result, the constitution provided for a quarter of the proceeds of land sales would go to the New Zealand Company until the debt was paid off.

=== Canterbury Association ===
The constitution specifically did not affect the legislation establishing the Canterbury Association. The Canterbury Association was given the ability to hand its powers over the new provincial council, once established (eventually the Canterbury Province). The Canterbury Association did so in 1853.

=== Otago Association ===
Because the land for settlement of Otago had originally been purchased by the New Zealand Company, the Constitution both restated the Crown's ability to dispose of the land (subject to existing purchase agreements), and protected the Otago Association from being directly regulated by the General Assembly. Like the Canterbury Association, the Otago Association was also given the power to hand its powers over the new provincial council (eventually the Otago Province).

== Implementation ==
The first provincial elections were held during 1853. The 1853 New Zealand general election for the General Assembly was held between 14 July and 1 October in 1853. The Parliament under the act met in Auckland, at the time the capital, in May 1854. This session was concerned primarily with the issue of responsible government, or the ability of the colonial parliament instead of the governor to appoint its own ministers. Prior to the act, the executive council consisted of Crown servants who were responsible to the governor. A motion was passed almost unanimously affirming the ability of Parliament to appoint its own executive council members. Three members of the assembly (and later one from the Legislative Council) were added to the executive council as ministers without portfolio under the leadership of James FitzGerald. The unofficial members soon resigned.

After fresh elections the 2nd Parliament met, and the new governor, Sir Thomas Gore Browne, asked Henry Sewell to form the first responsible ministry.

However, the General Assembly did not have total control of the executive. The governor retained reserve powers to disallow legislation and there was the authority of the Crown to disallow legislation even after the governor had given his assent. These powers of reservation and disallowance were prerogative powers included in the act. This power was limited by the Balfour Declaration of 1926, in that they were to be exercised only on the advice of New Zealand ministers. The powers were not continued by the Constitution Act 1986.

The powers of the assembly were given in the Colonial Laws Validity Act 1865 (28 & 29 Vict. c. 63), which stated that colonial legislatures had full powers to make laws respecting their own constitution, powers, and procedure.

== Amendments ==
The act was amended several occasions, beginning in 1857. The New Zealand Parliament did not have the ability to amend all parts of the act until 1947. A number of important amendments were made to the act by the New Zealand Parliament.

=== New Zealand Constitution (Amendment) Act 1857 ===
New Zealand Constitution (Amendment) Act 1857
- Act of Parliament
- Parliament of the United Kingdom
- Long title: An Act to amend the Act for granting a Representative Constitution to the Colony of New Zealand.
- Citation: 20 & 21 Vict. c. 53
- Territorial extent: United Kingdom; New Zealand; (Note: Section 3.)

Dates
- Royal assent: 17 August 1857
- Commencement
- Repealed: 10 December 1947
Other legislation
Amends	New Zealand Constitution Act 1852
Repealed by	New Zealand Constitution Amendment Act 1947

Status: Repealed

Text of statute as originally enacted

The first amendment to the act was made by the British Parliament passing the New Zealand Constitution (Amendment) Act 1857 (20 & 21 Vict. c. 53). This amendment granted the New Zealand General Assembly the ability to amend or repeal all of the provisions of the Constitution Act except provisions such as the establishment of the General Assembly itself and the extent of its legislative powers.

=== Abolition of the Provinces Act 1876 ===
This amendment abolished the Provinces of New Zealand;

=== New Zealand Constitution Amendment Act 1947 ===
New Zealand Constitution Amendment Act 1947 (Note: Section 2.)
- Act of Parliament
- Parliament of the United Kingdom
- Long title: An Act to provide for the amendment of the Constitution of New Zealand.
- Citation: 11 & 12 Geo. 6. c. 4
- Territorial extent: United Kingdom; New Zealand; (Note: Section 1.)

Dates
- Royal assent: 10 December 1947
- Commencement: 10 December 1947 (Note: The Acts of Parliament (Commencement) Act 1793.)
- Repealed: 16 November 1989
Other legislation
Amends	New Zealand Constitution Act 1852
Repeals/revokes	New Zealand Constitution (Amendment) Act 1857
Repealed by	Statute Law (Repeals) Act 1989

Status: Repealed

Text of statute as originally enacted

In 1947, New Zealand adopted the Statute of Westminster 1931 with the Statute of Westminster Adoption Act 1947 (11 Geo. VI No. 38). The only remaining provision of the Constitution Act relating to the Parliament of the United Kingdom was the ability of the former imperial legislature to legislate for New Zealand at the New Zealand Parliament's consent. This occurred only once, for the New Zealand Constitution Amendment Act 1947 (11 & 12 Geo. 6. c. 4) which adopted the New Zealand Parliament's New Zealand Constitution Amendment (Request and Consent) Act 1947 (11 Geo. VI No. 44).

=== Legislative Council Abolition Act 1950 ===
This amendment repealed the sections of the Constitution Act relating to the Legislative Council so that the New Zealand General Assembly, now Parliament, became a unicameral (single-chamber) legislature.

=== New Zealand Constitution Amendment Act 1973 ===
This amendment gave the New Zealand Parliament the power to pass laws of extraterritorial effect.

== Repeal ==
The act was rendered ineffective by section 26 of the Constitution Act 1986 of the New Zealand Parliament. By that time, only 18 of the act's original 82 sections remained, of which a number were regarded as no longer effective.

The whole act was repealed for the United Kingdom by section 1(1) of, and part VI of schedule 1 to, the Statute Law (Repeals) Act 1989, which came into force on 16 November 1989.

== See also ==
- Constitution of New Zealand
- Independence of New Zealand

== Bibliography ==
- McLean, Gavin (2006). The Governors: New Zealand's Governors and Governors-General. Dunedin: Otago University Press. ISBN 1-877372-25-0.
- "New Zealand Constitution Act 1852". Victoria University of Wellington - New Zealand Electronic Text Collection. 30 June 1852.
- Sinclair, Keith (1986). A Destiny Apart: New Zealand's Search for National Identity. Wellington: Unwin Paperbacks. ISBN 0-86861-682-6.
