= George Dean Pitt =

British Army general

Major-General George Dean Pitt KH
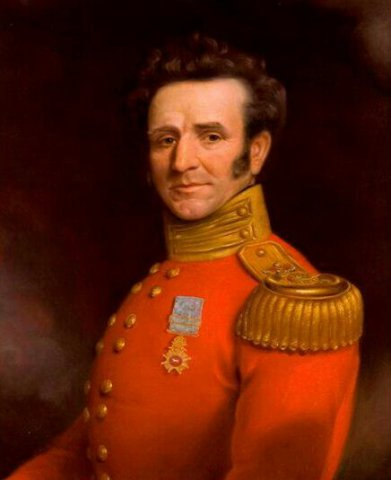
- Born: George Dean; 1781; Hampshire, England
- Died: 8 January 1851 (aged 69–70); Auckland, New Zealand
- Burial place: Anglican section, Symonds Street Cemetery, Auckland
- Spouse: Susan Baillie (m. 1821)
- Military career
- Allegiance: United Kingdom
- Branch: (United Kingdom of Great Britain and Ireland) British Army
- Service years: 1804–1851
- Rank: Major-General
- Units: 42nd Regiment, 1804; 90th Regiment, 1804– Royal African Corps, 1805– Royal West India Rangers, 1809– 2nd Provisional Battalion of Militia, 1814– 80th Regiment, 1819–
- Conflicts: Napoleonic Wars; Danish West Indies; Martinique; Peninsular War; Battle of Albuera; Battle of Usagre; Siege of Badajoz; Battle of Almaraz; Battle of Vitoria; Siege of Pamplona; Battle of the Pyrenees
- Awards: Knight of the Royal Hanoverian Guelphic Order; Military General Service Medal with 4 clasps

Major-General George Dean Pitt KH (1781 or 1772 – 8 January 1851) was Lieutenant-Governor of the former New Zealand Province of New Ulster from 14 February 1848 to his death on 8 January 1851.

== Early life ==
He was born George Dean, the illegitimate son of George Pitt, 2nd Baron Rivers. In 1819 he adopted the surname Dean Pitt by Royal Licence.

Major Dean Pitt was stationed at Malta with the 80th Regiment of Foot (Staffordshire Volunteers) from January to September 1828.

== Arrival in New Zealand ==
Dean Pitt arrived with his family on the barque Minerva at Auckland on 8 October 1847. He was the second most important military man in the new colony during the governorship of George Grey. His son and two of his sons-in-law were part of the military establishment as well. His residence was located in Pitt Street, which had originally been called Pyt Street after a childhood home of the first governor William Hobson, it is likely the spelling changed because of Dean Pitt's presence.

Ill for some time, he died on 8 January 1851 while Lieutenant-Governor and was buried with full military honours in the Symonds Street Cemetery in Auckland. A number of retail businesses in Auckland closed for the day of his funeral.

== Personal life ==
He married Susan Baillie at St James' Church, Bristol, England, on 21 May 1818.

=== Children ===
- Georgina Dean Pitt (11 April 1819–) Born at Clifton
- Emelia Marie Dean Pitt (20 June 1820 – 5 April 1877) Born at Edinburgh. m. 23 May 1848 at St. Paul's Church, Auckland, Captain J. H. Laye
- George Dean Pitt (14 June 1823 – 4 April 1883) Born at Cheltenham. m. 22 November 1842 Louisa Jones (18 February 1816 – 8 July 1889)
- Georgiana Dean Pitt (1822–23 May 1877)
- Louisa Dean Pitt (12 April 1825 – 7 April 1873) Born at Malta. m. 18 November 1848 Lieutenant George Hyde Page, at St. Paul's Church, Auckland
- Susan Dean Pitt (21 January 1828–) Born at Malta.
- Douglas Charles Dean Pitt (1829–) Born in Ireland. m. 10 December 1878 Alice Antoinette Birdwood at Mahableshwar, Bombay, India.
- Charlotte Marcia Dean Pitt (6 March 1830 – 7 April 1873) Born at Malta. m. 18 November 1848 Captain Charles Lavallin Nugent, at St. Paul's Church, Auckland
- William Augustus Dean Pitt (1833–8 November 1890) m. 11 June 1863 Anne Isabella Lloyd Gellibrand at Hobart, Tasmania, Australia. He was buried in Symonds Street Cemetery next to his father.
- Clara Eliza Dean Pitt (5 September 1838 – 1916) Born at Bristol. Died at Kensington, England, unmarried.
- Susan Dean Pitt (born 14 July 1847)
