= New Ulster Province =

Coordinates: 38°24′S 175°43′E

- Provinces of New Zealand
- Seal

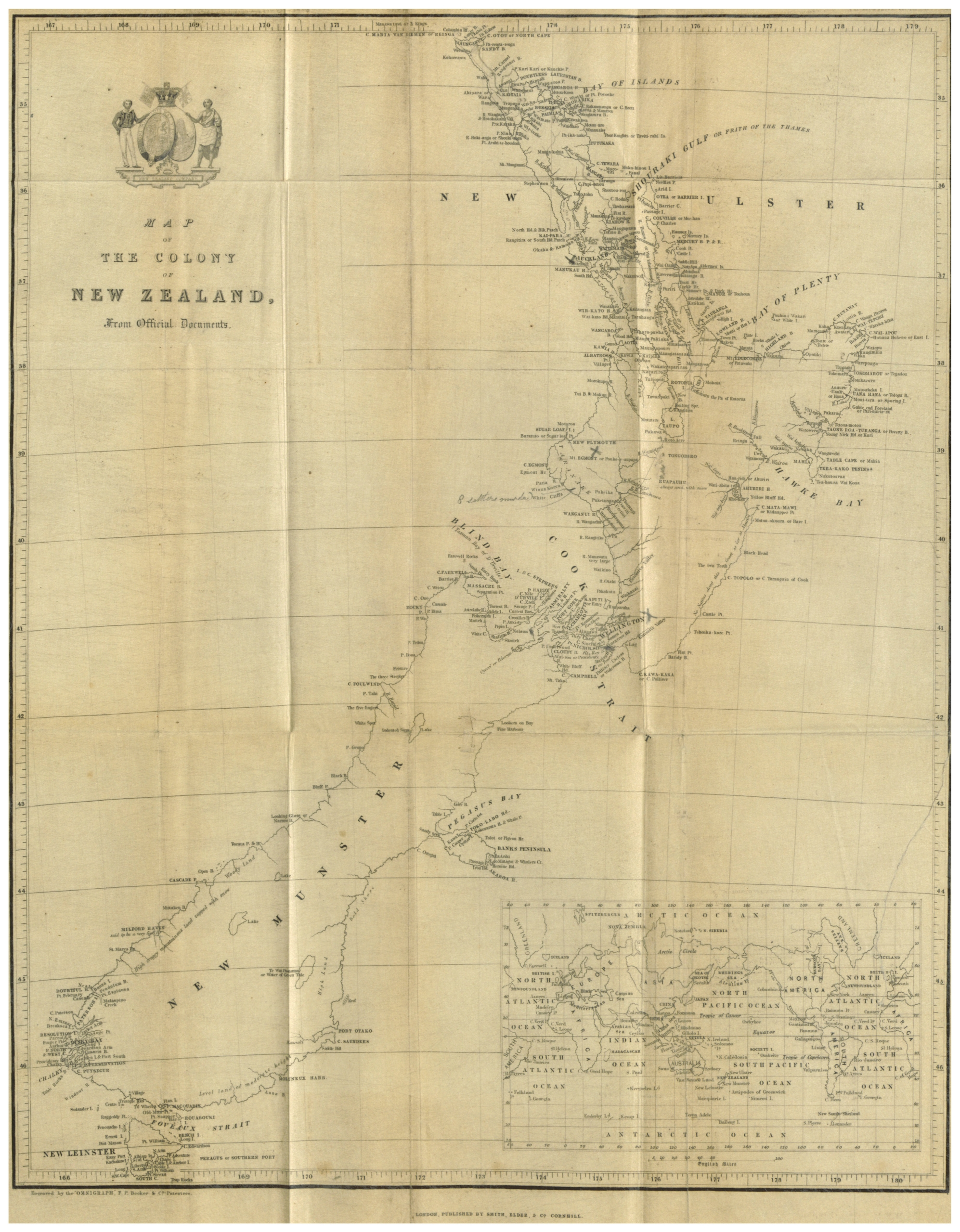
- Country: New Zealand
- Island: North Island
- Established: 1846
- Abolished: 1853
- Named for: Ulster

New Ulster was a province of the Colony of New Zealand that existed between 1841 and 1853. It was named after the Irish province of Ulster.

== Creation ==
Between 1841 and 1846, the province included all the North Island. With the passing of the New Zealand Constitution Act 1846, the province was defined as the North Island north of the Pātea River mouth. Like the other province of New Zealand at the time, New Munster Province, New Ulster Province was headed by a Lieutenant-Governor who reported to the Governor of New Zealand.

== Abolition ==
In 1852, a new Constitution Act was passed, and the New Ulster province was abolished and divided into Auckland Province, part of the Wellington Province and New Plymouth province (later Taranaki Province).

== Lieutenant-Governors ==
- George Dean Pitt (14 February 1848 – 8 January 1851)
- Robert Henry Wynyard (26 April 1851 – 7 March 1853)
