= New Munster Province =

Coordinates: 43°59′S 170°27′E

- Provinces of New Zealand
- Seal

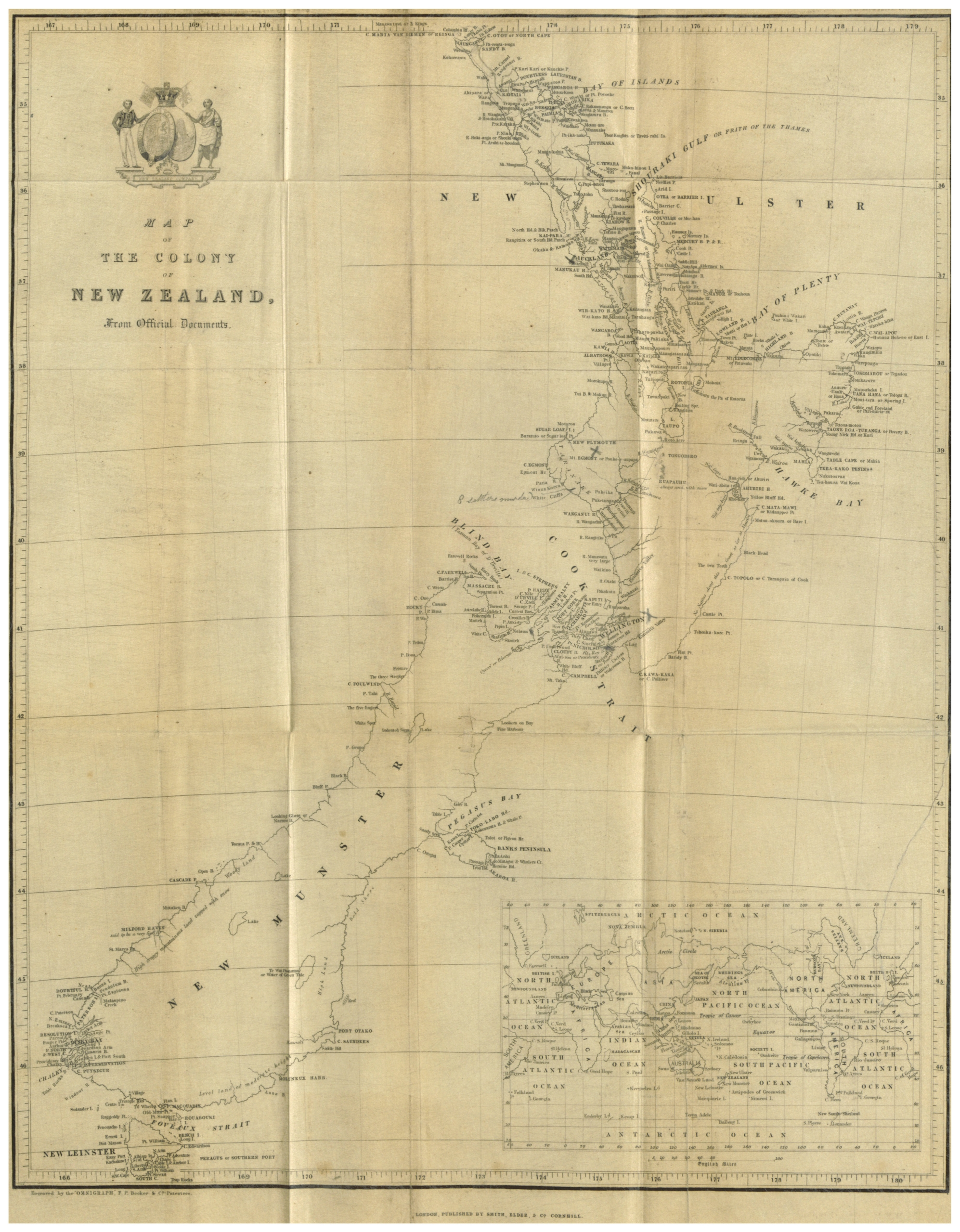
- Country: New Zealand
- Island: South Island
- Established: 1846
- Abolished: 1853
- Named for: Munster

New Munster was an early original name for the South Island of New Zealand, given by the Governor of New Zealand, Captain William Hobson, in honour of Munster, the Irish province in which he was born.

== Province ==
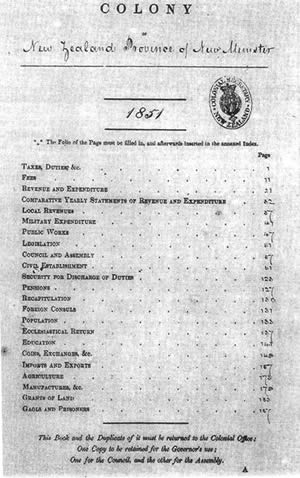
The New Munster Book of Statistics 1851

This act dissolved these provinces in 1853, after only seven years' existence, and New Munster was divided into the provinces of Wellington, Canterbury, Nelson, and Otago.

== Government appointments ==
- Sir Francis Dillon Bell: Appointed to the Legislative Council of the Province of New Munster.
- Alfred Domett: Colonial Secretary of New Munster.
- Edward John Eyre: Lieutenant-Governor of New Munster.
- Sir William Fox: Attorney-General of New Munster, although his acceptance was later withdrawn.
- William Gisborne: Private secretary to the Lieutenant-Governor of New Munster.
- Sir David Munro: Appointed to the Legislative Council of the Province of New Munster.
- John Davies Ormond: Private secretary to the Lieutenant-Governor of New Munster and Clerk of the New Munster Executive Council.
- Mathew Richmond: Appointed to the Legislative Council of the Province of New Munster.
