= 1860 Suburbs of Auckland by-election =

There were three 1860 by-elections in the Suburbs of Auckland electorate:

- January 1860 Suburbs of Auckland by-election
- April 1860 Suburbs of Auckland by-election
- August 1860 Suburbs of Auckland by-election
