= List of shipwrecks in May 1867 =

The list of shipwrecks in May 1867 includes ships sunk, foundered, grounded, or otherwise lost during May 1867.

== 1 May ==
List of shipwrecks: 1 May 1867
| Ship | State | Description |
|---|---|---|
| George and Henry | United Kingdom | The schooner was driven ashore and wrecked near Mizen Head, County Cork. Her crew were rescued. She was on a voyage from Limerick to Fort William, Inverness-shire. |
| John | United Kingdom | The schooner was lost off Hartland Point, Devon. |

== 2 May ==
List of shipwrecks: 2 May 1867
| Ship | State | Description |
|---|---|---|
| E. M. Carvill | United Kingdom | The ship was driven ashore at Ballyquinton Point, County Down. She was on a voyage from Ardrossan, Ayrshire to Dublin. |
| Harriet Agnes | United Kingdom | The steamship was driven ashore on Öland, Sweden. Her nineteen crew were rescued. She was on a voyage from Copenhagen, Denmark to Stockholm, Sweden. |
| Hibernia | United Kingdom | The ship was destroyed by fire at New York, United States. |

== 4 May ==
List of shipwrecks: 4 May 1867
| Ship | State | Description |
|---|---|---|
| Ariel | United Kingdom | The steamship capsized at Birkenhead, Cheshire. |

== 6 May ==
List of shipwrecks: 6 May 1867
| Ship | State | Description |
|---|---|---|
| Banff | United Kingdom | The schooner capsized and sank in the River Ness when she was launched. |
| Compass | United Kingdom | The ship struck the Vynell Rock, off the coast of Cornwall and was damaged. She was on a voyage from Liverpool, Lancashire to Ipswich, Suffolk. She put in to Penzance, Cornwall in a leaky condition. |
| Gulnare | United Kingdom | The barque was wrecked at Dunan Head, Wigtownshire. Her crew were rescued. |
| Japanese | United Kingdom | The ship was sighted in the Atlantic Ocean whilst on a voyage from Rangoon, Burma to Liverpool. No further trace, presumed foundered with the loss of all hands. |

== 7 May ==
List of shipwrecks: 7 May 1867
| Ship | State | Description |
|---|---|---|
| Ben Nevis | (United Kingdom of Great Britain and Ireland) New Zealand | The schooner left Wanganui for Havelock and was never seen again. |
| Claret | United Kingdom | The brig was driven ashore and wrecked at "Tombye", Denmark. Her crew were rescued. She was on a voyage from North Shields, County Durham to Kronstadt, Russia. |
| Eliza | Prussia | The brig was driven ashore and wrecked at "Tombye". Her crew were rescued. She was on a voyage from Newcastle upon Tyne, Northumberland, United Kingdom to Copenhagen, Denmark. |
| John Arthur | United Kingdom | The ship was driven ashore and wrecked at "Chiltepic", Mexico. Her crew were rescued. |
| Ukko | Flag unknown | The ship was driven ashore in the Dardanelles. She was on a voyage from Newcastle upon Tyne to Constantinople, Ottoman Empire. She was refloated the next day. |
| Zuma | United Kingdom | The schooner was driven ashore and wrecked at "Tombye". Her crew were rescued. She was on a voyage from Newcastle upon Tyne to Danzig. |

== 8 May ==
List of shipwrecks: 8 May 1867
| Ship | State | Description |
|---|---|---|
| Anna | United Kingdom | The schooner was wrecked on Skagen, Denmark with the loss of all but one of her crew. She was on a voyage from Newcastle upon Tyne, Northumberland to Gothenburg, Sweden. |
| Bertha | United Kingdom | The barque was driven ashore at "Kandestererne", Denmark, Her crew were rescued. She was on a voyage from London to Sundsvall, Sweden. |
| Byron | United States | Byron The two-masted schooner capsized and sank in 135 feet (41 m) of water in Lake Michigan 12 miles (19 km) southeast of Sheboygan, Wisconsin, at 43°36.310′N 087°41.268′W after colliding with the schooner Canton 4 miles (6.4 km) off Amsterdam, Wisconsin. Canton rescued all three people aboard. Byron′s wreck lies within the Wisconsin Shipwreck Coast National Marine Sanctuary. |
| Ceylon | United Kingdom | The ship was abandoned in the Atlantic Ocean. She was on a voyage from Pomaron, Portugal to Liverpool, Lancashire. |
| Enossis | Italy | The ship was wrecked on Milos, Greece. She was on a voyage from Constantinople, Ottoman Empire for Messina, Sicily. |
| Villa Nova | Portugal | The ship ran aground in Inverkip Bay. She was on a voyage from Glasgow, Renfrewshire, United Kingdom to Sines. She was refloated and put back to Glasgow. |

== 9 May ==
List of shipwrecks: 9 May 1867
| Ship | State | Description |
|---|---|---|
| Ayrshire Lass | United Kingdom | The brig ran aground on the Long Bank, in the Irish Sea off the coast of County Wexford. She was on a voyage from Liverpool, Lancashire to Halifax, Nova Scotia, British North America. She was refloated with the assistance of a tug and resumed her voyage. |
| City of Melbourne | United Kingdom | The ship ran aground at Liverpool. She was on a voyage from Mobile, Alabama, United States to Liverpool. She was refloated. |
| Goldseeker | Flag unknown | The brigantine was driven ashore and wrecked at Hokitika while en route from Melbourne. |
| Mutin | France | The fishing schooner was wrecked off the south coast of Iceland. Her crew were rescued. |
| Sea King | United Kingdom | The barque was sunk by ice in the Grand Banks of Newfoundland with the loss of five of her crew. She was on a voyage from Grimsby, Lincolnshire to Quebec City, Province of Canada, British North America. |

== 10 May ==
List of shipwrecks: 10 May 1867
| Ship | State | Description |
|---|---|---|
| Conqueror | United Kingdom | The ship was abandoned off the coast of Ceylon. Her crew were rescued. |
| Continent | United States | The ship was abandoned in the Atlantic Ocean. Her crew survived. She was on a voyage from New Orleans, Louisiana to Havre de Grâce, Seine-Inférieure, France and/or Liverpool, Lancashire. |
| Heroes of Alma | United Kingdom | The ship departed from Hong Kong for Hakodate, Japan. No further trace, presumed foundered with the loss of all hands. |
| Julia Maxwell | United Kingdom | The ship departed from Havana, Cuba for Falmouth, Cornwall. No further trace, presumed foundered with the loss of all hands. |
| Pilgrim | United Kingdom | The ship caught fire in the West India Docks, London. |
| Sarah Williams | United Kingdom | The ship was driven ashore at Kristiansand, Norway. |

== 11 May ==
List of shipwrecks: 11 May 1867
| Ship | State | Description |
|---|---|---|
| New Speedwell | United Kingdom | The ketch was driven ashore at Kimmeridge, Dorset. She was refloated on 15 May. |
| Prince Consort | United Kingdom | The paddle steamer was wrecked on Altens Rock, 3 nautical miles (5.6 km) south of Aberdeen. All on board were rescued. She was on a voyage from Granton, Lothian to the Orkney Islands. |
| Prudence | United Kingdom | The ship was wrecked at Rønne, Denmark. Her crew were rescued. She was on a voyage from Newcastle upon Tyne, Northumberland to Saint Petersburg, Russia. |
| Tynemouth | United Kingdom | The paddle tug caught fire and sank in the Humber. |
| William Cargill | United Kingdom | The paddle tug collided with the steamship Fairy (United Kingdom) and sank in the River Tyne. Her crew were rescued. She was refloated on 15 May. |

== 12 May ==
List of shipwrecks: 12 May 1867
| Ship | State | Description |
|---|---|---|
| Ann Rendle | United Kingdom | The brig was wrecked on the Ararife Reef, in the Abrolhos Islands, Brazil. She was on a voyage from Rio de Janeiro to Bahía. |
| Feronia | United Kingdom | The ship was abandoned in the Atlantic Ocean. Her crew were rescued by Crescencia (Spain). Feronia was on a voyage from Fowey, Cornwall to Quebec City, Province of Canada, British North America. |
| Frithjoy | (United Kingdom of Great Britain and Ireland) New Zealand | The schooner was wrecked at Kennedy Bay during a strong gale. All hands were saved. |
| Rama | (United Kingdom of Great Britain and Ireland) Guernsey | The ship was wrecked at Montville, Seine-Inférieure, France. Her crew were rescued. She was on a voyage from Newcastle upon Tyne, Northumberland to Saint-Malo, Ille-et-Vilaine, France. |

== 13 May ==
List of shipwrecks: 13 May 1867
| Ship | State | Description |
|---|---|---|
| Agnes | Grand Duchy of Mecklenburg-Schwerin | The brig was driven ashore and capsized at Prerow with the loss of all hands. She was on a voyage from Newcastle upon Tyne, Northumberland, United Kingdom to Stockholm, Sweden. |
| Alice | United Kingdom | The ship was wrecked on the Corton Sand, in the North Sea off the coast of Suffolk. Her crew were rescued. She was on a voyage from South Shields, County Durham to London. |
| Ann Jones | United Kingdom | The ship was driven ashore. She was on a voyage from Stockton-on-Tees, County Durham to Newport, Monmouthshire. She was refloated and put in to Lowestoft, Suffolk in a leaky condition. |
| Charlotte | United Kingdom | The ship ran aground on Anholt. She was on a voyage from Hull, Yorkshire to Jakobstad, Denmark. |
| Favourite | United Kingdom | The ship ran aground on the Sizewell Bank, in the North Sea off the coast of Suffolk. She was on a voyage from Sunderland, County Durham to London. She was refloated but consequently sank. Her crew were rescued. |
| Hermine | Stettin | The ship ran aground at "Suuderland". |
| Monarch | United Kingdom | The ship foundered in the North Sea 45 nautical miles (83 km) east of Tynemouth, Northumberland. Her crew were rescued by the tug Ursa Major (United Kingdom). Monarch was on a voyage from the River Tyne to Kronstadt, Russia. |
| St. Nicholas | Russia | The lighter sank at Taganrog. |

== 14 May ==
List of shipwrecks: 14 May 1867
| Ship | State | Description |
|---|---|---|
| Anne Brown | United Kingdom | The smack was wrecked at Ramsey, Isle of Man. Her crew were rescued. She was on a voyage from Maryport, Cumberland to Dumfries. |
| Arctic | Norway | The ship was driven ashore at Tabasco. Her crew were rescued. She was a total loss. |
| Col. Orne | United States | The schooner was run down and sunk while on her homeward passage from New York. Crew saved. |

== 15 May ==
List of shipwrecks: 15 May 1867
| Ship | State | Description |
|---|---|---|
| Duo | United Kingdom | The barque was wrecked 25 nautical miles (46 km) south of Laguna, Brazil. At least five crew survived. |

== 16 May ==
List of shipwrecks: 16 May 1867
| Ship | State | Description |
|---|---|---|
| Guy Mannering | United Kingdom | The ship was wrecked on Matinicus Isle, Maine, United States. She was on a voyage from Boston, Massachusetts, United States to Saint John, New Brunswick, British North America. |
| Hercyna | United Kingdom | The barque was driven onto the Port Nieuf Rock, in the Gulf of Saint Lawrence and was abandoned by her crew. She was on a voyage from Grimsby, Lincolnshire to Quebec City, Province of Canada, British North America. |
| New Speedwell | United Kingdom | The ketch was driven ashore on the coast of Dorset. She was on a voyage from Kimmeridge to Cowes, Isle of Wight. She was refloated and put in to Weymouth, Dorset in a leaky condition. |

== 17 May ==
List of shipwrecks: 17 May 1867
| Ship | State | Description |
|---|---|---|
| Cora Linn | United Kingdom | The ship collided with Lady Hassett (United Kingdom) and sank off Lundy Island, Devon. |
| Harrison | United Kingdom | The ship was driven ashore at Neustadt in Holstein, Prussia. She was on a voyage from Wismar to Gävle, Sweden. |
| Lord Raglan | United Kingdom | The steamship was driven ashore near Hellevoetsluis, Zeeland, Netherlands. |
| Monarch | Russia | The brig foundered in the English Channel off Weymouth, Dorset. |
| Robert | Prussia | The ship ran aground off "Hoddersee". Her crew were rescued. She was on a voyage from Rostock to Danzig. |

== 18 May ==
List of shipwrecks: 18 May 1867
| Ship | State | Description |
|---|---|---|
| Chicago | United States | The steamship ran aground on the Diamond Reef. She was on a voyage from New York to Liverpool, Lancashire, United Kingdom. She was refloated and resumed her voyage. |

== 20 May ==
List of shipwrecks: 20 May 1867
| Ship | State | Description |
|---|---|---|
| Cresswell | United Kingdom | The ship sank on the Lemon Sand, in the North Sea. Her crew were rescued by Daring (United Kingdom). Cresswell was on a voyage from South Shields, County Durham to Alexandria, Egypt. |
| Helen | United Kingdom | The smack was wrecked on the Skullmartin Rock, in the Belfast Lough. |
| New Whim | United Kingdom | The schooner was wrecked on Scroby Sands, Norfolk. Her crew were rescued by the Caister Lifeboat. |
| Spring | United Kingdom | The ship sprang a leak and was beached at Flamborough Head, Yorkshire. She was on a voyage from South Shields to London. She was refloated the next day and taken in to Bridlington, Yorkshire. |
| Trusty | United Kingdom | The schooner sprang a leak and foundered in the North Sea off Southwold, Suffolk. Her crew were rescued by the sloop Mystery (United Kingdom). Trusty was on a voyage from West Hartlepool County Durham to Honfleur, Manche, France. |
| Union | United Kingdom | The collier, a schooner, sprang a leak and foundered in the North Sea 13 nautical miles (24 km) north north west of the Outer Dowsing Lightship ( Trinity House). Her crew were rescued by the brig Rover (United Kingdom). Union was on a voyage from Sunderland, County Durham to Cowes, Isle of Wight. |

== 21 May ==
List of shipwrecks: 21 May 1867
| Ship | State | Description |
|---|---|---|
| Blonde | United Kingdom | The barque foundered in the Atlantic Ocean. Her crew were rescued by Otago (United Kingdom). Blonde was on a voyage from Newfoundland, British North America to Sligo. |
| Choice | United Kingdom | The smack was driven ashore and wrecked at Scarborough, Yorkshire with the loss of two of her five crew. Survivors were rescued by the Scarborough Lifeboat. |
| Scotia | United Kingdom | The ship was driven ashore at Pensacola, Florida, United States. |
| Sea Belle | United Kingdom | The schooner was run into and abandoned off Møn, Denmark. Her crew were rescued by Charlotte Kanland ( Wismar). Sea Belle was on a voyage from the Firth of Forth to Danzig. She was taken in to Præstø, Denmark in a derelict condition. |
| Smuggler | (United Kingdom of Great Britain and Ireland) New Zealand | The schooner capsized near Rodney Point, Whanganui Island, while en route from Whangārei to Auckland, with the loss of one life, the ship's cook. |
| Sophia | United Kingdom | The ship collided with Quickstep (United Kingdom) and sank off the coast of Pembrokeshire. Her crew were rescued by Quickstep. Sophia was on a voyage from the River Duddon to Swansea, Glamorgan. |
| Susan Hincks | United States | The ship was driven ashore at Pensacola. |
| Thomas Dryden | United Kingdom | The brigantine foundered in the Atlantic Ocean. Her crew survived. She was on a voyage from Sunderland, County Durham to Bombay, India. |
| Three Brothers | (United Kingdom of Great Britain and Ireland) New Zealand | The schooner was wrecked at Waikawa Heads when it dragged its anchor while riding out a gale. |
| William and Sarah | United Kingdom | The brig ran aground on the Sheringham Shoal, in the North Sea off the coast of Norfolk. She was on a voyage from South Shields, County Durham to the Nieuw Diep. She was refloated and taken in to Great Yarmouth, Norfolk in a leaky condition. |

== 22 May ==
List of shipwrecks: 22 May 1867
| Ship | State | Description |
|---|---|---|
| Elizabeth Lane | United Kingdom | The collier, a brig, was wrecked on the Lemon and Ower Sand, in the North Sea. Her crew survived. She was on a voyage from Rotterdam, South Holland, Netherlands to South Shields, County Durham. |
| Newton | United Kingdom | The brig struck the Sheringham Shoal, in the North Sea off the coast of Norfolk and foundered. Her crew were rescued by the schooner Widdrington (United Kingdom). Newton was on a voyage from South Shields to Dieppe, Seine-Inférieure, France. |
| North American | (United Kingdom of Great Britain and Ireland) British North America | The steamship was driven ashore on Anticosti Island, Nova Scotia. Her passengers were taken off. She was on a voyage from Montreal, Province of Canada to London. She was declared a total loss. |
| Santiago de Cuba | United States | The steamship was wrecked on the coast of New Jersey with the loss of six lives. She was on a voyage from Nicaragua to New York. |
| Wisconsin | United States | The steamship was destroyed by fire in Lake Ontario with the loss of 30 lives. |

== 23 May ==
List of shipwrecks: 23 May 1867
| Ship | State | Description |
|---|---|---|
| Amicizia | Austria-Hungary | The brig ran aground on the Newcombe Sand, in the North Sea off the coast of Suffolk, United Kingdom and sank. All twelve people on board were rescued by the Kessingland and Pakefield Lifeboats. She was on a voyage from Newcastle upon Tyne, Northumberland, United Kingdom to Savona, Italy. |
| Lady Anne | United Kingdom | The ship ran aground near Le Crotoy, Somme, France. She was on a voyage from Wells-next-the-Sea, Norfolk to Le Crotoy. She was refloated on 31 May and take in to Saint-Valery-sur-Somme. |

== 24 May ==
List of shipwrecks: 24 May 1867
| Ship | State | Description |
|---|---|---|
| Heinrich Beckman | Flag unknown | The ship ran aground on the Endracht Bank. She was on a voyage from Antwerp, Belgium to Odesa, Russia. She was refloated. |

== 25 May ==
List of shipwrecks: 25 May 1867
| Ship | State | Description |
|---|---|---|
| Dorset | United Kingdom | The schooner sprang a leak and sank off Great Yarmouth, Norfolk. Her crew were rescued by Elizabeth. Dorset was on a voyage from Ipswich, Suffolk to Hull, Yorkshire. |
| Hannah Mary | United Kingdom | The ship sank in Ramsey Sound. |
| Nonpareil | United Kingdom | The schooner foundered off the Tuskar Rock. Her four crew survived. She was on a voyage from Liverpool, Lancashire to Waterford. |

== 26 May ==
List of shipwrecks: 26 May 1867
| Ship | State | Description |
|---|---|---|
| Ariel | United Kingdom | The schooner collided with Blackburn and sank in the North Sea. Her crew were rescued by Iddo (United Kingdom). |
| Unnamed | United Kingdom | The schooner was run down and sunk by the steamship Princess Royal off Portpatrick, Wigtownshire with the loss of all hands. |

== 27 May ==
List of shipwrecks: 27 May 1867
| Ship | State | Description |
|---|---|---|
| Acquilla | (United Kingdom of Great Britain and Ireland) Jersey | The paddle steamer was abandoned in the Irish Sea. She was on a voyage from Liverpool, Lancashire to Jersey. She came ashore at Bonmahon, County Waterford and was wrecked. |
| Blanche Moore | United Kingdom | The ship was wrecked on the Longbank, in the Irish Sea off the coast of County Wexford. Her 37 crew were rescued by the Carnsore lifeboat. She was on a voyage from Liverpool, Lancashire to Calcutta, India. |
| Hyndman | United Kingdom | The brig foundered in the Atlantic Ocean 45 nautical miles (83 km) off Sines, Portugal. Her crew survived. She was on a voyage from Villa Real to Ipswich, Suffolk. |
| Majestic | United Kingdom | The ship was driven ashore at Flamborough Head, Yorkshire. |
| Nadeschda | Russia | The ship ran aground and was wrecked near Domesnes, Courland Governorate. She was on a voyage from Riga to an English port. |
| Ophelia | United Kingdom | The ship departed from Hong Kong. No further trace, presumed foundered with the loss of all hands. |

== 28 May ==
List of shipwrecks: 28 May 1867
| Ship | State | Description |
|---|---|---|
| Elizabeth | United Kingdom | The ship was driven ashore at Whitstable, Kent. She was on a voyage from Newcastle upon Tyne, Northumberland to Rotterdam, South Holland, Netherlands. She was refloated. |
| Fame | United Kingdom | The schooner was run down and sunk in the River Thames at Erith, Kent by the steamship General Havelock (United Kingdom). Her crew were rescued by General Havelock. Fame was on a voyage from Teignmouth, Devon to London. |
| Hermann Albert | Netherlands | The schooner was abandoned in the Atlantic Ocean. Her crew were rescued. She was on a voyage from Montevideo, Uruguay to an English port. |
| Mary and Fanny | United Kingdom | The ship was wrecked on Ramsey Island, Pembrokeshire. She was on a voyage from Ayr to Llanelly, Glamorgan. |

== 30 May ==
List of shipwrecks: 30 May 1867
| Ship | State | Description |
|---|---|---|
| HMS Osprey | Royal Navy | The Vigilant-class gunvessel was wrecked in Algoa Bay off Cape St. Francis, Cape Colony with the loss of a crew member. |

== 31 May ==
List of shipwrecks: 31 May 1867
| Ship | State | Description |
|---|---|---|
| Coquimbana | United Kingdom | The barque ran aground on the Tyssen Patch, in Falkland Sound. Her crew were rescued. She was on a voyage from Valparaíso, Chile to Bristol, Gloucestershire. |
| Jantje Tiddens | Netherlands | The ship was sunk by ice off "Somers", Russia. Her crew were rescued. She was on a voyage from London, United Kingdom to Saint Petersburg, Russia. |
| Svetlana | Imperial Russian Navy | The Ilya Murmorets-class frigate ran aground on the Goodwin Sands, Kent, United Kingdom. She was refloated. |

== Unknown date ==
List of shipwrecks: Unknown date in May 1867
| Ship | State | Description |
|---|---|---|
| Alert | Norway | The brig ran aground at Porto, Portugal and was abandoned by her crew. She was on a voyage from Porto to London, United Kingdom. |
| Alsager | United Kingdom | The ship ran aground at the mouth of the Mississippi River. She was on a voyage from New Orleans, Louisiana, United States to Liverpool, Lancashire. |
| Anna Wilhelmina | Netherlands | The ship foundered in the North Sea before 4 May with the loss of her captain. She was on a voyage from Newcastle upon Tyne, Northumberland, United Kingdom to "Wardoe". |
| Bethiah Jewett | United Kingdom | The ship was driven ashore in Moisic Bay before 17 May. Her crew survived. Bethiah Jewett was on a voyage from the Clyde to Montreal, Province of Canada, British North America. She was consequently condemned. |
| Broderlandet | Flag unknown | The ship foundered off the Shetland Islands, United Kingdom with the loss of nineteen of her crew. She was on a voyage from the River Tyne to Bombay, India. |
| Ellida | United Kingdom | The ship was wrecked at Coquimbo, Chile. She was on a voyage from Coquimbo to Rio de Janeiro, Brazil. |
| Enchanter | United Kingdom | The ship was driven ashore in Trinity Bay before 17 May. Her crew survived. She was on a voyage from Dundee, Forfarshire to Quebec City, Province of Canada. She was later refloated and taken in to Quebec City for repairs. |
| Excellent | United Kingdom | The ship was abandoned at sea. Her crew were rescued by Nina (United Kingdom). Excellent was on a voyage from Liverpool, Lancashire to Quebec City. |
| Fiery Star | United Kingdom | The ship was destroyed by an onboard explosion off Pernambuco, Brazil with the loss of her captain. |
| Formosa | United Kingdom | The steamship struck a rock off Ockseu Island, Formosa and was damaged. She was on a voyage from Amoy to Hong Kong. |
| Freeland | United Kingdom | The ship foundered before 23 May. Her crew were rescued. She was on a voyage from Cardiff, Glamorgan to Singapore, Straits Settlements. |
| Gem of the Seas | United Kingdom | The ship capsized on the stocks at Saint Thomas, Virgin Islands. She was consequently broken up. |
| Glenalva | United Kingdom | The ship was driven ashore in Trinity Bay. She was on a voyage from Greenock, Renfrewshire to Quebec City. |
| Hand of Providence | United Kingdom | The brig foundered on or before 25 May. Her crew were rescued. she was on a voyage from South Shields, County Durham to Kronstadt, Russia. |
| Harrier | (United Kingdom of Great Britain and Ireland) New Zealand | The cutter left Auckland for Wellington in mid-May with a crew of two and a cargo of doors and other house fittings, and was not seen again. |
| Jane | United Kingdom | The ship collided with a barque and sank off Ystad, Sweden. She was on a voyage from Sunderland, County Durham to Kronstadt, Russia. |
| Johanna Maria Christina | Netherlands | The ship was wrecked at Batavia, Netherlands East Indies. |
| Lancastrian | United Kingdom | The ship ran aground at the mouth of the Mississippi River. She was on a voyage from Liverpool to New Orleans. |
| Lightning | United Kingdom | The ship sank off Tortola. |
| Nile | United Kingdom | The ship was driven ashore at Cape Chat, Province of Canada. She was on a voyage from New York to Quebec City. She had been refloated by 16 May. |
| Prudhoe Castle | United Kingdom | The ship was driven ashore at Cape Cestos. She was refloated on 15 May. |
| Research | United Kingdom | The ship was aground on the Red Island Reef. She was on a voyage from the Clyde to Quebec City. She was refloated and resumed her voyage in a leaky condition, arriving at Quebec City on 20 May. |
| Salem | United Kingdom | The ship sprang a leak and was abandoned in the Atlantic Ocean before 11 May. Her crew were rescued by North Western (United States). Salem was on a voyage from London to Philadelphia, Pennsylvania, United States. |
| Superior | United Kingdom | The ship was sunk by ice off Cape Freels, Newfoundland, British North America. Her crew were rescued. |
| Virginia | Prussia | The full-rigged ship foundered in the Atlantic Ocean before 13 May. Her crew were rescued by Royal Edward (United Kingdom). Virginia was on a voyage from Kronstadt to the Amoor River. |
| Wabene | United Kingdom | The ship was driven ashore and wrecked at North Cape, Prince Edward Island, British North America. She was on a voyage from Liverpool to Miramichi, New Brunswick. |
| Wasp | United Kingdom | The schooner sank at Cape Town, Cape Colony before 9 May. |
| Ziagra | United Kingdom | The barque ran aground on the Carang Brom Reef, in the Bangka Strait before 12 May. She was on a voyage from London to Singapore, Straits Settlements. She was refloated and completed her voyage. |
