= April 1860 Suburbs of Auckland by-election =

New Zealand by-election

The April 1860 Suburbs of Auckland by-election was a New Zealand by-election held in the Suburbs of Auckland electorate following the resignation of Frederick Merriman. He was replaced by Joseph Hargreaves unopposed.

The Suburbs of Auckland electorate was one of the original 24 electorates used for the 1st New Zealand Parliament in 1853 and existed until the end of the term of the 2nd New Zealand Parliament in 1860. It was a two-member electorate.

Merriman resigned on 13 March 1860 and was replaced on 5 April by Hargreaves. Theophilus Heale—the other representative of the electorate at that time—thanked the electors for electing Hargreaves.
