= List of shipwrecks in May 1852 =

The list of shipwrecks in May 1852 includes ships sunk, foundered, wrecked, grounded, or otherwise lost during May 1852.

== 1 May ==
List of shipwrecks: 1 May 1852
Ship	State	Description
Asia	United Kingdom	The brig was driven ashore at Great Yarmouth, Norfolk. she was on a voyage from Hull Yorkshire to London. She was refloated and resumed her voyage, but ran aground on the Holm Sand, in the North Sea off the coast of Suffolk and was abandoned.
Washington	United Kingdom	The full-rigged ship ran aground on the Troubridge Shoals. She was on a voyage from Glasgow, Renfrewshire to Adelaide, South Australia. She had been refloated by 12 June.
Waverley	United Kingdom	The brig ran aground on the Holm Sand, in the North Sea off the coast of Suffolk. She was on a voyage from Hartlepool, County Durham to London. She was refloated the next day and resumed her voyage in a leaky condition, having taken aboard extra hands.
William Hyde	United Kingdom	The ship ran aground and was severely damaged at Hokianga, New Zealand. She was on a voyage from Hokianga to London. She was refloated and resumed her voyage, but consequently put in to Auckland, New Zealand on 14 May.

== 2 May ==
List of shipwrecks: 2 May 1852
Ship	State	Description
Asia	United Kingdom	The ship ran aground on the Holm Sand, in the North Sea off the coast of Suffolk and was abandoned by her crew. She was on a voyage from Hull, Yorkshire to London.
Brancepeth Castle	United Kingdom	The brig foundered in the North Sea. Her crew survived. She was on a voyage from the Newcastle upon Tyne, Northumberland to Hamburg.
Claudius Civilis	Flag unknown	The ship was driven ashore. She was refloated and taken in to Cardiff, Glamorgan, United Kingdom.
Devonshire	United Kingdom	The schooner was driven ashore at Newhaven, Sussex. She was refloated and taken in to Newhaven.
Ebenezer	United Kingdom	The schooner sprang a leak and sank. She was later refloated.
Emanuel	Hamburg	The ship was driven ashore and wrecked on Scharhörn. Her crew were rescued. She was on a voyage from Trondheim, Norway to Altona.
Frederick Young	United Kingdom	The ship foundered in The Sleeve. Her crew survived. She was on a voyage from Newcastle upon Tyne, Northumberland to Kronstadt, Russia.
Margaret and Ann	(United Kingdom of Great Britain and Ireland) New South Wales	The ship was driven ashore at Port Fairy, Victoria.

== 3 May ==
List of shipwrecks: 3 May 1852
Ship	State	Description
Adnemar	France	The ship ran aground in a river in Sierra Leone. She was on a voyage from Sierra Leone to Marseille, Bouches-du-Rhône. She was declared a total loss.
Essington	(United Kingdom of Great Britain and Ireland) New South Wales	The ship was driven ashore and severely damaged at Port Fairy, Victoria.
Twee Gebroeders	Netherlands	The koff ran aground on the Burg Sand, in the North Sea off the Dutch coast. She was on a voyage from Amsterdam, North Holland to Naples, Kingdom of the Two Sicilies. She had been refloated by 5 May and resumed her voyage.

== 4 May ==
List of shipwrecks: 4 May 1852
Ship	State	Description
Singapore	United Kingdom	The ship ran aground off Blankenese. She was later refloated and taken in to Hamburg.
Statira Morse	United States	The ship was in collision with the full-rigged ship Ashley in the Clyde and was beached. She was on a voyage from New York to Greenock, Renfrewshire, United States.

== 5 May ==
List of shipwrecks: 5 May 1852
Ship	State	Description
James	United Kingdom	The brig capsized and sank at Jarrow, County Durham. She was refloated on 7 May and beached.
Titania	(United Kingdom of Great Britain and Ireland) Royal Yacht Squadron	Robert Stephenson's yacht was destroyed by fire at Cowes, Isle of Wight.

== 6 May ==
List of shipwrecks: 6 May 1852
Ship	State	Description
Caprice	France	The cutter yacht ran aground on the Nayland Rock, Margate, Kent, United Kingdom. She was refloated and taken in to Margate, Kent.
Guide	United Kingdom	The ship ran aground on the Haisborough Sands, in the North Sea off the coast of Norfolk. She was on a voyage from Newcastle upon Tyne, Northumberland to Cádiz, Spain.
Swallow	United Kingdom	The steamship ran aground in the River Avon.

== 7 May ==
List of shipwrecks: 7 May 1852
Ship	State	Description
General Palafox	Prussia	The brig was wrecked off Taganrog, Russia. Her crew were rescued. She was on a voyage from Taganrog to a British port.
Prentice	United Kingdom	The ship caught fire at Charleston, South Carolina and was scuttled.

== 8 May ==
List of shipwrecks: 8 May 1852
Ship	State	Description
Anna Robertson	United Kingdom	The ship was sighted in the Indian Ocean whilst on a voyage from Ceylon to London. No further trace, presumed foundered with the loss of all hands.
Mate	Austrian Empire	The brig was wrecked at Troy, Ottoman Empire.
Tagus	United Kingdom	The ship ran aground in the Tagus downstream of Belém, Portugal. She was on a voyage from Liverpool, Lancashire to Lisbon, Portugal.

== 9 May ==
List of shipwrecks: 9 May 1852
Ship	State	Description
British Queen	United Kingdom	The steamship caught fire. She put in to Holyhead, Anglesey and was scuttled. She was on a voyage from Liverpool, Lancashire to Constantinople, Ottoman Empire. She was refloated and put back to Liverpool.
Easurian	United Kingdom	The ship was wrecked at Saugor, India. Her crew were rescued. she was on a voyage from Calcutta, India to Penang, Malay and Singapore.
Fairy	United Kingdom	The schooner was wrecked on a reef north of Barbuda. Her crew survived. She was on a voyage from Nova Scotia, British North America to Port of Spain, Trinidad.
Georgina	United Kingdom	The ship was driven ashore near Saugor. She was on a voyage from Calcutta to Mauritius.
Hornet	United Kingdom	The ship was driven ashore at White Point, County Kerry.
Janet	United Kingdom	The ship was driven ashore in the Nive. She was refloated and taken in to Bayonne, Basses-Pyrénées for repairs.
Queen	United Kingdom	The ship ran aground on Hallands Wadero. She was on a voyage from Dordrecht, South Holland, Netherlands to Danzig. She was refloated on 11 May and taken in to Helsingør, Denmark.

== 10 May ==
List of shipwrecks: 10 May 1852
Ship	State	Description
Cromwell	United Kingdom	The ship departed from Akyab, Burma for London. No further trace, presumed foundered with the loss of all hands.
Hope	United Kingdom	The ship was driven ashore at Maryport, Cumberland. She was on a voyage from Dublin to Maryport.
Libra	France	The ship departed from Akyab for Rotterdam, South Holland, Netherlands. No further trace, presumed foundered with the loss of all hands.

== 11 May ==
List of shipwrecks: 11 May 1852
Ship	State	Description
James H. Shepherd	United Kingdom	The ship was driven ashore in the Scheldt. She was on a voyage from Antwerp, Belgium to New York. She was refloated.
Mary	United Kingdom	The ship ran aground on the Long Sand, in The Wash and was wrecked. Her crew were rescued by the pilot smack Trinity (United Kingdom). Mary was on a voyage from Hartlepool, County Durham to King's Lynn, Norfolk.
Nithsdale	United Kingdom	The ship ran aground off Eierland, North Holland, Netherlands. She was on a voyage from Cardiff, Glamorgan to Hamburg. She was refloated on 13 May.
Temperance	United Kingdom	The ship ran aground on the Cleaves.
Maidstone	United Kingdom	The barque ran aground and was severely damaged. She was on a voyage from Rochester, Kent to Newcastle upon Tyne, Northumberland.

== 12 May ==
List of shipwrecks: 12 May 1852
Ship	State	Description
Hope	United Kingdom	The ship was driven ashore at Maryport, Cumberland. She was on a voyage from Dublin to Maryport.
Maria	Prussia	The ship was driven ashore near Liebau. She was on a voyage from Stettin to Königsberg.
'S Gravenhaage	Netherlands	The ship ran aground on the Banjaard Sand, in the North Sea off the Dutch coast and was abandoned by her crew. She was refloated the next day and taken in to Brouwershaven, Zeeland.
Voyageuse	Hamburg	The ship ran aground on the Pagensand, in the North Sea. She was on a voyage from Rio de Janeiro, Brazil to Hamburg. She was refloated on 14 May and completed her voyage.

== 13 May ==
List of shipwrecks: 14 May 1852
Ship	State	Description
Betsy Jane	United Kingdom	The schooner was wrecked at "Parao". Her crew were rescued. She was on a voyage from Montevideo, Uruguay to Buenos Aires, Argentina.
Senhouse	United Kingdom	The ship foundered in the Atlantic Ocean. Her crew were rescued. She was on a voyage from Liverpool, Lancashire to Newfoundland, British North America.

== 14 May ==
List of shipwrecks: 14 May 1852
Ship	State	Description
Centaur	India	The ship ran ashore on the coast of Arabia 120 nautical miles (220 km) south of Muscat, Sultanate of Muscat and Oman. The local Arabs plundered and burnt the vessel. Her crew were rescued. She was on a voyage from Calcutta to Muscat, then Bushire and Bassora, Persia.
Dublin	United Kingdom	The East Indiaman sprang a leak and was abandoned in the Indian Ocean. She sank three or four days later. Her crew survived despite Fairfield (United Kingdom refusing to render assistance. Dublin was on a voyage from Calcutta to London.
Charlotte	United Kingdom	The ship was driven into Glentanner (United Kingdom and was severely damaged in a typhoon at Calcutta, India.
City of Calcutta	United Kingdom	The ship was driven ashore in a typhoon at Calcutta.
Element	United Kingdom	The ship was driven ashore in a typhoon at Calcutta.
Glentanner	United Kingdom	The ship was run into by Charlotte (United Kingdom and then was driven ashore in a typhoon at Calcutta. She was severely damaged.
Moe	United Kingdom	The ship ran aground and was wrecked in the Yangtze Kiang with some loss of life. She was on a voyage from Bombay, India to Shanghai, China.
Nereides	United Kingdom	The ship was wrecked near Saugor. There were six survivors. She was on a voyage from Calcutta to Liverpool, Lancashire.
New York	United Kingdom	The ship was driven ashore in the Hooghly River at Fultah, india. She was on a voyage from Calcutta to Antwerp, Belgium. She was refloated and put back to Calcutta for reparis.
Ratcliff	United Kingdom	The ship ran aground on the Pulo Brasse Rocks and was severely damaged. She was on a voyage from Penang to Calcutta. She was refloated and completed her voyage.
Resolution	United Kingdom	The ship ran aground off the Dutch coast. She was on a voyage from Cardiff, Glamorgan to Hamburg. She was refloated and taken in to Terschelling, Friesland, Netherlands in a severely leaky condition.
Talisman	United Kingdom	The ship ran aground south of Hogland, Russia. She was refloated with assistance from the steamship Naslesdik (Russia).
Victoria	United Kingdom	The ship was wrecked on the Cobler's Rocks, in the Bahamas.

== 15 May ==
List of shipwrecks: 15 May 1852
Ship	State	Description
Ann Hope	United Kingdom	The ship departed from Havana, Cuba for Cowes, Isle of Wight. No further trace, presumed foundered with the loss of all hands.
Equity	United Kingdom	The ship ran aground off Terschelling, Netherlands. She was on a voyage from Cardiff, Glamorgan to Hamburg. She was refloated and resumed her voyage.
Laurel	United Kingdom	The ship sprang a leak and was beached in the Pentland Skerries, where she was wrecked. Her crew were rescued. She was on a voyage from a Welsh port to Aberdeen.
London	United Kingdom	The ship was abandoned in a typhoon in the Indian Ocean. Her crew were rescued. She was on a voyage from Akyab, Burma to Cowes, Isle of Wight.
Marie	France	The ship was driven ashore at Hjorting, Denmark. She was on a voyage from Dieppe, Seine-Inférieure to "Leilea".

== 16 May ==
List of shipwrecks: 16 May 1852
Ship	State	Description
Adler	Netherlands	The ship put in to Falmouth, Cornwall, United Kingdom on fire and was scuttled. She was on a voyage from Bahia, Brazil to Amsterdam, North Holland.
Nonpareil	United Kingdom	The ship was driven ashore and wrecked at Paraíba, Brazil. She was on a voyage from Pernambuco to Paraíba.

== 17 May ==
List of shipwrecks: 17 May 1852
Ship	State	Description
Eutatrungen	Norway	The ship was wrecked "in the Wasa Sheeren". She was on a voyage from Arendal to "Wetterborten".
Favourite	(United Kingdom of Great Britain and Ireland) New South Wales	The schooner was sighted off Cape Howe. No further trace, presumed foundered with the loss of all on board, including Sir Montagu Chapman. She was on a voyage from Sydney to Melbourne, Victoria.
John White	United Kingdom	The brig ran aground on the Corton Sand, in the North Sea off the coast of Suffolk. She was on a voyage from South Shields, County Durham to London. She was refloated and resumed her voyage.
Princess	United Kingdom	The ship sprang a leak and was beached at Egremont, Lancashire. She was on a voyage from Runcorn Cheshire to "Wadso".

== 18 May ==
List of shipwrecks: 18 May 1852
Ship	State	Description
Ellen and Esther	United Kingdom	The schooner was damaged by fire at Brundley's Wharf, Bermondsey, Surrey.
Jane	United Kingdom	The ship sprang a leak and was beached at Milford Haven, Pembrokeshire, where she sank. She was on a voyage from Newport, Monmouthshire to Cardiff, Glamorgan to São Paulo da Assunção de Loanda, Portuguese West Africa.
Mountaineer	United Kingdom	The ship ran aground in the North Channel off the Pass A L'Outre Lighthouse, Louisiana, United States. She was on a voyage from New Orleans, Louisiana to Liverpool, Lancashire.
Providence	United Kingdom	The ship, a sloop or smack, was damaged by fire at Brundley's Wharf.
Union	United Kingdom	The flat was wrecked at Penmaenmawr, Caernarfonshire with the loss of both crew.
Violet	United Kingdom	The schooner was damaged by fire at Brundley's Wharf.

== 19 May ==
List of shipwrecks: 19 May 1852
Ship	State	Description
Mountaineer	United Kingdom	The ship was driven ashore in the Mississippi River. She was on a voyage from New Orleans, Louisiana, United States to Liverpool, Lancashire.
Pallion Hall	United Kingdom	The ship was driven ashore on the coast of Yorkshire. She was refloated the next day and taken in to Hartlepool, County Durham.
Roxanne	United Kingdom	The schooner was wrecked on Ireland's Eye. Her crew were rescued. She was on a voyage from Maryport, Cumberland to Dublin.
Urgent	United Kingdom	The ship was driven ashore at Bulls Breakers, near, Charleston South Carolina. She was on a voyage from Liverpool, Lancashire to New York and Charleston.

== 20 May ==
List of shipwrecks: 20 May 1852
Ship	State	Description
Britannia	United Kingdom	The ship ran aground on the Haisborough Sands, in the North Sea off the coast of Norfolk. She was on a voyage from Margate, Kent to Newcastle upon Tyne, Northumberland. She was refloated and taken in to Great Yarmouth, Norfolk in a leaky condition.
Commercial Packet	United Kingdom	The ship ran aground on the Haisborough Sands. She was on a voyage from London to Sunderland, County Durham. She was refloated and taken in to Great Yarmouth in a leaky condition.
Emmanuel	United Kingdom	The ship was wrecked on the Haisborough Sands. Her crew were rescued. She was on a voyage from Goole, Yorkshire to London.
Laura, or Laurie	United Kingdom	The ship foundered off Ailsa Craig, in the Firth of Forth with the loss of all hands. She was on a voyage from Troon, Ayrshire to Dublin.
Progress	Belgium	The barque ran aground on The Smalls and consequently foundered 16 nautical miles (30 km) south east of the Tuskar Rock. Her crew were rescued. She was on a voyage from Ostend, West Flanders to Liverpool, Lancashire, United Kingdom.
Vrouw Grietje	Flag unknown	The ship was abandoned in the English Channel. All on board were rescued by Clemence (United Kingdom. Vrouw Grietje was on a voyage from Liverpool to Havre de Grâce, Seine-Inférieure, France or Narva, Russia. She was taken in to Littlehampton, Sussex, United Kingdom in a derelict condition on 1 June.

== 21 May ==
List of shipwrecks: 21 May 1852
Ship	State	Description
Fairmount	United States	The barque was run down and sunk by the full-rigged ship Tennessee (United States) with the loss of all but two of the twelve people on board. Survivors were rescued by Tennessee.
Franz Anton	Rostock	The ship was lost near Dunkirk, Nord, France. Her crew were rescued. She was on a voyage from Rostock to Antwerp, Belgium.
Huntress	United Kingdom	The ship was wrecked on the Maro Reef, in the Pacific Ocean. She was on a voyage from San Francisco, California to Hong Kong.
Margaret	United Kingdom	The ship was driven ashore near Thornbye, Denmark. She was on a voyage from Newcastle upon Tyne, Northumberland to Kronstadt, Russia. She was refloated the next day.
Sir John Byng	(United Kingdom of Great Britain and Ireland) New South Wales	The brig was driven ashore at Port Fairy, Victoria.
Temple	United Kingdom	The ship was holed by an anchor and sank at Holyhead, Anglesey.
Union	United Kingdom	The ship was wrecked off Penmaenmawr, Caernarfonshire before 26 May with the loss of both of her crew.

== 22 May ==
List of shipwrecks: 22 May 1852
Ship	State	Description
Anne and Maria	United Kingdom	The barque was destroyed by fire at Charlestown, Massachusetts, United States.
Bourse d'Anvers	Belgium	The ship was driven ashore in the Scheldt. She was on a voyage from Antwerp to Havana, Cuba. She was refloated and put back to Antwerp.
Huntress	United States	The ship was wrecked on the Maro Reef. The twenty people on board took to two boats. Fifteen of them were rescued, five were reported missing. She was on a voyage from San Francisco, California to Hong Kong.

== 23 May ==
List of shipwrecks: 23 May 1852
Ship	State	Description
Brigand	United Kingdom	The steamship ran aground in Gibraltar Bay. She was on a voyage from Malta to Gibraltar. She was refloated, and taken in to Gibraltar the next day.
Friendship	United Kingdom	The ship was driven ashore on the coast of County Wexford. She was refloated and taken in to Wexford.

== 24 May ==
List of shipwrecks: 24 May 1852
Ship	State	Description
Diana	United Kingdom	The ship ran aground on the Heyst. She was on a voyage from Antwerp, Belgium to Liverpool, Lancashire. She was refloated and put in to Vlissingen, Zeeland, Netherland in a leaky condition.
Express	United Kingdom	The ship ran aground off Margate, Kent. She was on a voyage from Antwerp, Belgium to Genoa, Kingdom of Sardinia. She was refloated and resumed her voyage.
Washington	United Kingdom	The ship ran aground at the mouth of the Mississippi River. She was on a voyage from Liverpool, Lancashire to New Orleans, Louisiana, United States. She was refloated and put in to Mobile, Alabama, United States.
Water Witch	United Kingdom	The ship struck the Chicken Rock and foundered off the Calf of Man, Isle of Man. Her crew were rescued. She was on a voyage from Liverpool, Lancashire to Narva, Russia.

== 25 May ==
List of shipwrecks: 25 May 1852
Ship	State	Description
Concordia	Russia	The barque collided with the barque Pictura (Netherlands) and sank in the White Sea.
Sabina	United Kingdom	The ship was driven ashore at Flamborough Head, Yorkshire. She was on a voyage from Dordrecht, South Holland, Netherlands to Bo'ness, Lothian. She was refloated the next day.

== 26 May ==
List of shipwrecks: 26 May 1852
Ship	State	Description
Betsey and Mary	United Kingdom	The sloop ran aground on the West Hoyle Bank, in Liverpool Bay and sank. Her crew were rescued. She was on a voyage from Troon, Ayrshire to Liverpool, Lancashire.
Golden Goose	(United Kingdom of Great Britain and Ireland) British North America	The ship was wrecked at Margaree, Newfoundland with the loss of all hands. She was on a voyage from the Magdalen Islands, Nova Scotia to Charlottetown, Prince Edward Island.
Isabella	United Kingdom	The schooner was driven ashore and wrecked at Whitby, Yorkshire. Her crew were rescued.
Josephine	(United Kingdom of Great Britain and Ireland) British North America	The ship was driven ashore and wrecked in the Magdalen Islands. Her crew were rescued. She was on a voyage from Halifax, Nova Scotia to Montreal, Province of Canada
Prentice	United Kingdom	The ship caught fire at Charleston, South Carolina, United States and was scuttled.
Providence	(United Kingdom of Great Britain and Ireland) British North America	The ship was wrecked off Anticosti Island, Province of Canada. Her crew were rescued by Violet ( (United Kingdom of Great Britain and Ireland) British North America).
Redruth	United Kingdom	The ship was driven ashore east of Lavernock Point, Cornwall.
Swift	(United Kingdom of Great Britain and Ireland) British North America	The ship was driven ashore and wrecked in the Magdalen Islands.
Triumph	United Kingdom	The ship ran aground off Düne, Heligoland. She was abandoned the next day and sank. Her crew were rescued.

== 27 May ==
List of shipwrecks: 27 May 1852
Ship	State	Description
John Clifford	United States	The ship was wrecked in Humboldt Bay. She was on a voyage from Boston, Massachusetts to San Francisco, California.

== 28 May ==
List of shipwrecks: 28 May 1852
Ship	State	Description
Deodate	Norway	The barque was wrecked on St. Paul's Island, Nova Scotia, British North America. She was on a voyage from Pugwash, Nova Scotia to Hull, Yorkshire, United Kingdom.
Dorset	(United Kingdom of Great Britain and Ireland) New South Wales	The brig was wrecked upon the Kent Group in Bass Strait. There were no deaths. She was on a voyage from Hobart, Van Diemen's Land to Melbourne, New South Wales.
Lady Elizabeth	(United Kingdom of Great Britain and Ireland) Dominica	The ship was wrecked in Mangot Bay.

== 30 May ==
List of shipwrecks: 30 May 1852
Ship	State	Description
Francis	United Kingdom	The ship was abandoned in the Dogger Bank. Her crew were rescued by Anne Christine (United Kingdom. Francis was on a voyage from a Scottish port to Pillau, Prussia.
Hawk	United Kingdom	The ship was driven ashore at "Bwlch Bridin", Caernarfonshire. She was refloated but consequently sank. Her crew were rescued.
Lyme Regis	United Kingdom	The ship ran aground on the Maplin Sand, in the North Sea off the coast of Essex. She was on a voyage from London to San Francisco, California, United States. She was refloated and taken in to The Downs.
Reparateur	France	The ship ran aground on the Helen Sand, in the North Sea. She was on a voyage from Newcastle upon Tyne, Northumberland, United Kingdom to Les Sables-d'Olonne, Vendée. She was refloated and put in to Lowestoft, Suffolk in a sinking condition.

== Unknown date ==
List of shipwrecks: Unknown date in May 1852
Ship	State	Description
Anna Robertson	United Kingdom	The ship foundered in the Indian Ocean east of the Cape of Good Hope, Cape Colony with the loss of all hands.
Banner	United States	The steamboat sank in the Mississippi River downstream of Memphis, Tennessee.
Bridget	United Kingdom	The ship foundered in the Irish Sea off the coast of County Louth before 24 May.
Elizabeth	Prussia	The barque was driven ashore on the French coast. She was on a voyage from Licata, Sicily to Saint Petersburg, Russia. She was refloated and put in to Hull, Yorkshire, United Kingdom in a leaky condition. She arrived on 5 May.
Express	United Kingdom	The ship was driven ashore at Margate, Kent. She was refloated on 24 May and resumed her voyage.
Grace Darling	United Kingdom	The ship was wrecked on the Cuba Keys. She was on a voyage from Manzanilla, Trinidad for Rotterdam, South Holland, Netherlands.
James	United Kingdom	The ship capsized at Jarrow, Northumberland. She was righted on 7 May and beached.
Jane	United Kingdom	The ship foundered in the Atlantic Ocean off Nantucket, Massachusetts, United States before 9 May. Her crew were rescued. She was on a voyage from Ardrossan, Ayrshire to Boston, Massachusetts.
Jupiter	United Kingdom	The barque ran aground at Fortaleza Ozama, Saint Domingo. She was refloated with assistance from Crocodile (French Navy).
Louisa Christina	Flag unknown	The ship was lost off Castletown, County Cork before 17 May.
Mahoning	United States	The 119-foot (36 m) brigantine went aground in Lake Erie. She was refloated and returned to service.
Margaret	United Kingdom	The ship was driven ashore at Chatham, Nova Scotia, British North America.
Zephyr	United Kingdom	The ship was wrecked at New Calabar before 6 May.
