= Whanganui (disambiguation) =

Whanganui, also spelled "Wanganui", is a city in the Manawatu-Wanganui Region of New Zealand.

Whanganui or Wanganui may also refer to:

== Places in New Zealand ==
- Whanganui (New Zealand electorate), formerly spelled Wanganui
- Whanganui District, a district, Manawatu-Wanganui Region
- Whanganui Island, Waikato Region
- Whanganui National Park, Manawatu-Wanganui Region
- Whanganui River, Manawatu-Wanganui Region
- Whanganui A Hei (Cathedral Cove) Marine Reserve, Coromandel
- Wanganui and Rangitikei, a past electorate
- Wanganui River, South Island
- Te Whanganui a Tara or Wellington Harbour

== Other ==
- Wanganui, a code name for a method of marking bombing targets by RAF Bomber Command during WWII
