= John Logan Campbell =

New Zealand politician (1817–1912)

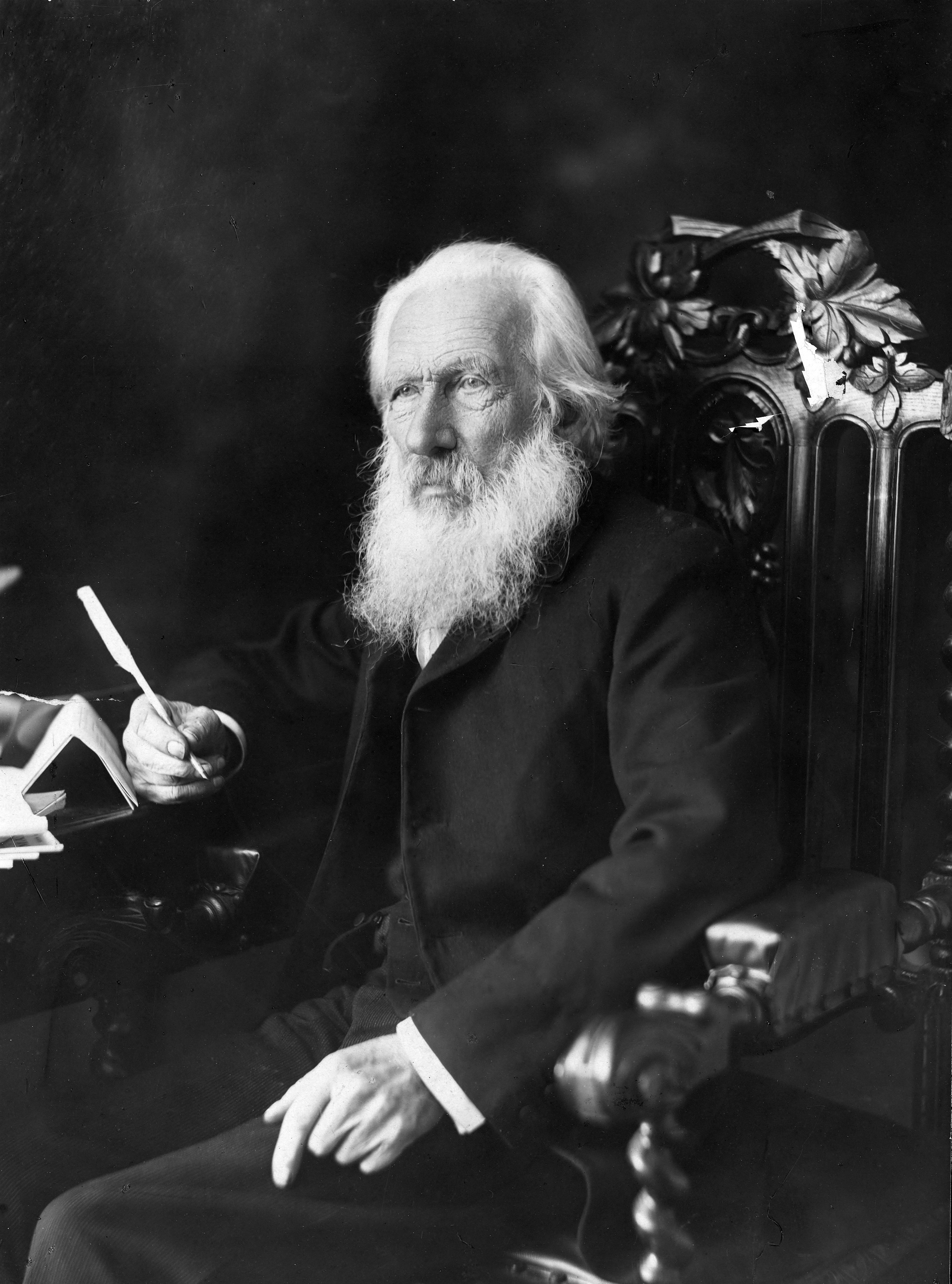
- John Logan Campbell as an elderly man

3rd Superintendent of Auckland Province
- In office 15 November 1855 – 17 September 1856
- Preceded by: William Brown
- Succeeded by: John Williamson

17th Mayor of Auckland City
- In office 8 May 1901 – 25 July 1901
- Preceded by: David Goldie
- Succeeded by: Alfred Kidd

Personal details
- Born: 3 November 1817 Edinburgh Scotland
- Died: 22 June 1912 (aged 94)
- Relations: John Cracroft Wilson (father-in-law); Michael Campbell (great-great-great-grandson)
- Occupation: politician
- Known for: Mayor of Auckland City

Sir John Logan Campbell (3 November 1817 – 22 June 1912) was a Scottish-born New Zealand public figure. He was described by his contemporaries as "the father of Auckland".

== Early life ==
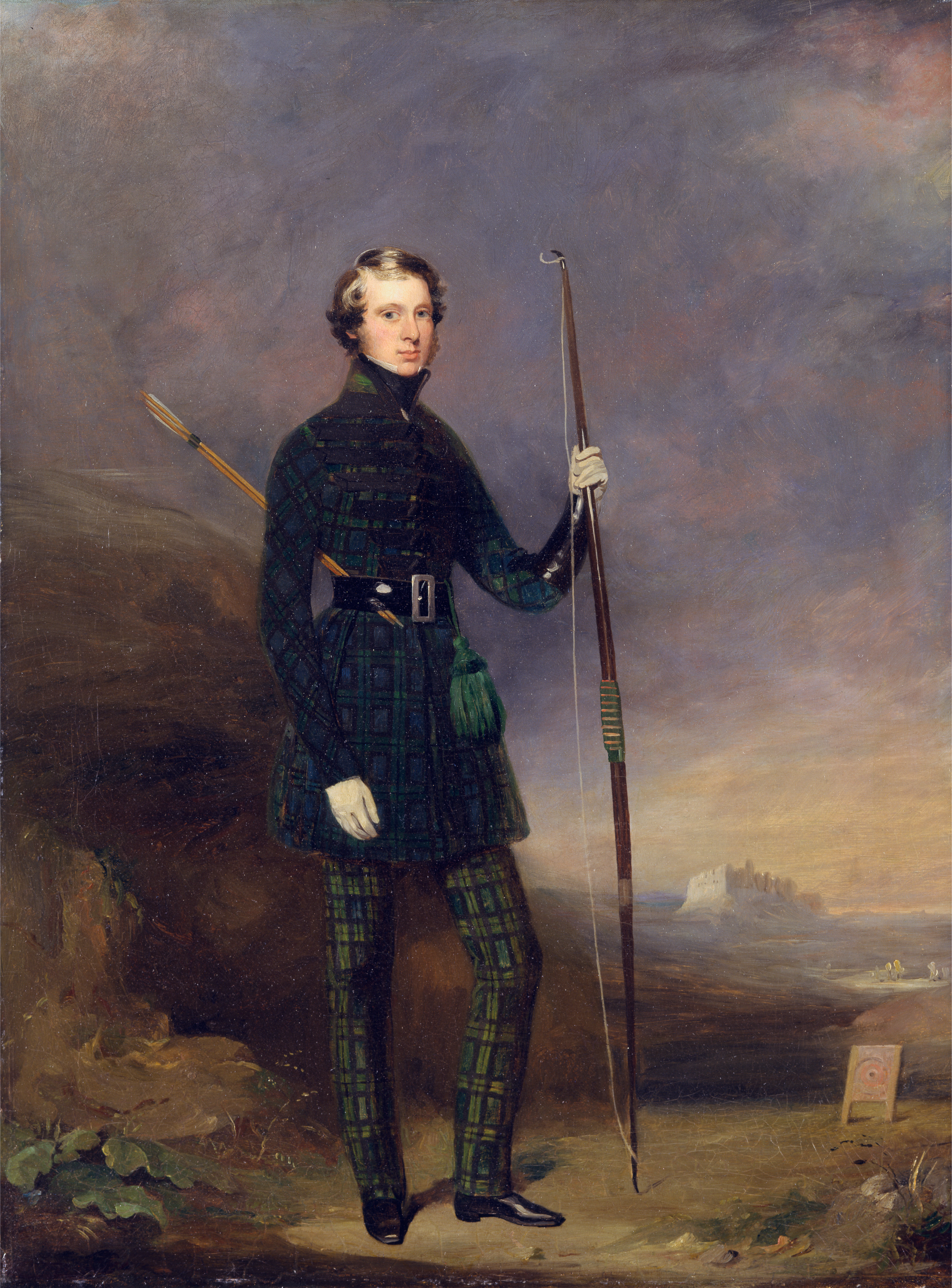
John Logan Campbell in the club dress of the Edinburgh Albion Archers.(Mungo Burton, 1838). Yale Centre for British Art.

John Logan Campbell was born in Edinburgh, Scotland, on 3 November 1817, a son of the Edinburgh surgeon John Campbell and his wife Catherine and grandson of the 3rd baronet of Aberuchill and Kilbryde and Kilbryde castle near Dunblane, Perthshire. He had four sisters but his two elder brothers had died by the time he reached the age of two, and he became the only surviving son. Campbell graduated in medicine from the University of Edinburgh in 1839 and later that year sailed for Australia, New South Wales, as a surgeon on the emigrant ship Palmyra.

== Migration to New Zealand ==
Confronted with drought and constrained prospects at the time Campbell departed Australia for New Zealand in March 1840 on the Lady Liford, arriving at Port Nicolson, and eventually travelling to Waiou (now called Whanganui Island) on the Coromandel. Campbell and William Brown (a Scottish lawyer) who had previously met in Adelaide, Australia, formed a business partnership after purchasing Motukorea from Te Kanini of Ngāti Tamaterā and the sub-chiefs Katikati and Ngatai with the aim of becoming merchant traders.

They decided to abandon 'quill-driving and pill-making' and become traders in the new capital, Auckland. On 21 December 1840 they began operations as Auckland's first merchant firm, Brown and Campbell, when Campbell pitched his tent on the edge of the small bay, at the foot of present day Queen Street. Campbell and Brown built Acacia Cottage in 1841, on their street frontage the partners put up a two-storeyed warehouse from which they conducted their business as general merchants in the infant city of Auckland. Campbell quickly became prominent in Auckland, both in business circles and in public life. He was a director of the Bank of New Zealand, the New Zealand Loan and Mercantile Agency Company, and the New Zealand Insurance Company.

== Auckland Province ==
Campbell was elected to the Auckland Provincial Council on 20 March 1855, and he served until 15 September of that year. He was then Superintendent of Auckland Province from 25 November 1855 to 17 September 1856.

== Member of Parliament ==
New Zealand Parliament
Years	Term	Electorate	Party
1855–1856	2nd	City of Auckland	Independent
1860	2nd	Suburbs of Auckland	Independent

Campbell entered the 2nd New Zealand Parliament, representing the electorates of the City of Auckland 1855–1856 (resigned). He was elected unopposed on 4 August 1860 in the Suburbs of Auckland electorate, replacing Joseph Hargreaves. Campbell retired at the end of the 2nd Parliament in late 1860. He was a minister without portfolio in the government of Edward Stafford between June and November 1856.

== Middle years ==
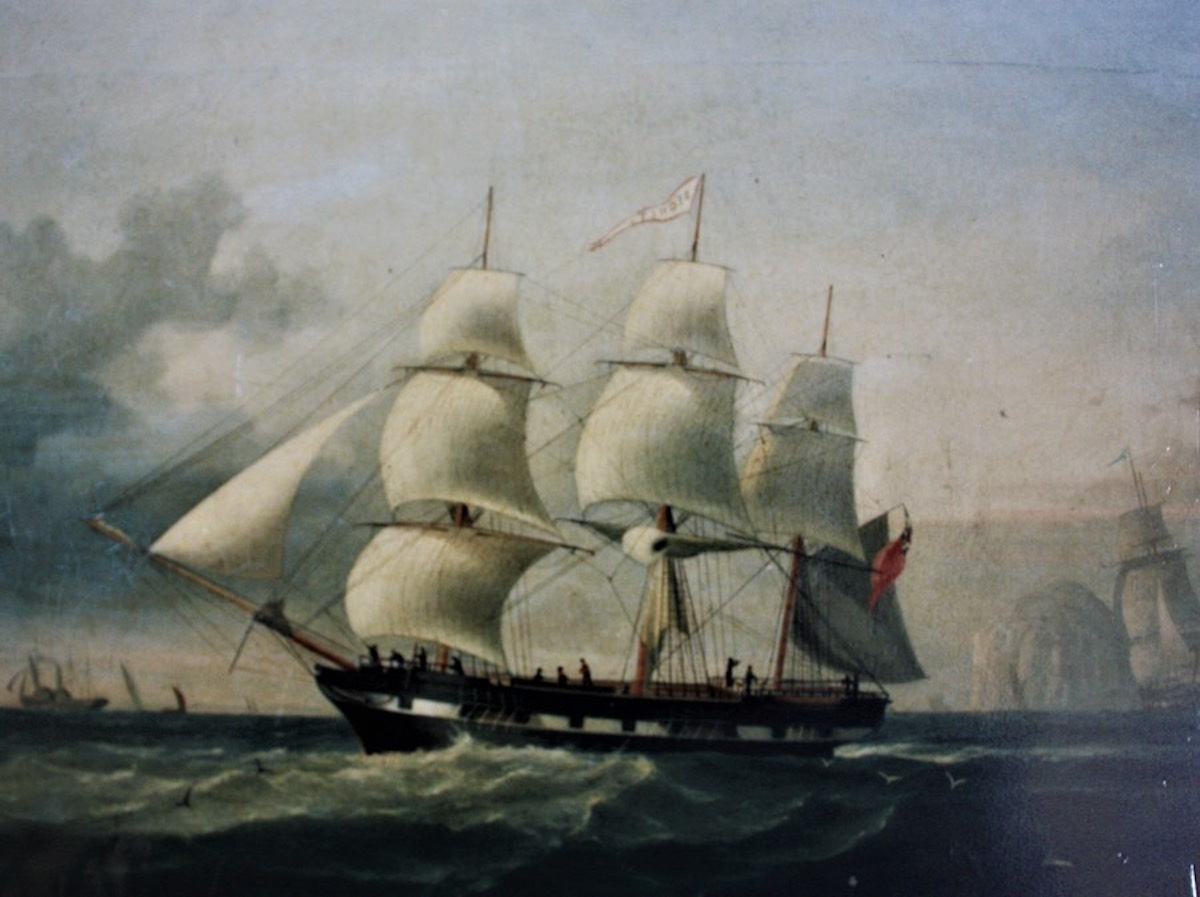
The Signet purchased in May 1854 in Geelong, Australia

Campbell was a successful businessman and had entered into a partnership with William Brown in 1840, beginning operations as Auckland's first merchant firm, Brown and Campbell. In May 1854, the Signet ship was purchased on behalf of Campbell in Geelong, Australia for the timber trade. By 1856 Campbell and Brown decided that their enterprises and properties, now worth £110,000, could be entrusted to a salaried manager, while they lived on the dividends as expatriates.

Brown and his family left early in the year, but Campbell's departure was delayed. On 20 November 1856 he left the colony, he hoped for good.

While travelling abroad, he married Emma Wilson on 25 February 1858 at Meerut, NWP India. She was a daughter of Sir John Cracroft Wilson, who later settled in Canterbury. They had four children: Cecily born in Auckland on 16 May 1861 died 20 November 1861 aged 6 months, Ida, born at Naples on 22 December 1859 and died in London 1880; and twins John Logan and Winifred born at Florence on 26 May 1864. John Logan died in infancy in Florence, Italy and is buried at in the English Cemetery at the Piazzale Donatello – Delgli Inglesi. 'And there lies buried in that little grave,' Campbell told his two daughters, 'the poor Papa's hopes that to him had been born a son who would be his pride and pleasure in his declining years and to whose care the name of his Firm would have been handed down to another generation. . . . And thus it is that our fondest hopes and dearest aspirations are ever and again doomed to a bitter disappointment'. With this bereavement, Campbell said, 'we felt ourselves completely unhinged', 'the brightness of that Florence home was gone'.

Apart from an interlude during 1860 and 1861, when he was obliged to go to Auckland to reinvigorate the firm – now called Brown Campbell and Company – and to install a resident partner, the Campbells lived in various parts of Europe until 1871. On his return early in 1871, Campbell took over full control. Two years later he bought out Brown's partnership share for over £40,000. Becoming a part of the business community again, he became involved with the Bank of New Zealand, the New Zealand Loan and Mercantile Agency Company, the New Zealand Insurance Company, and related companies. Campbell had a marked philanthropic interest in the advancement of education. He donated a sum of £500 and a block of land on the corner of Pitt and Wellington Streets and a brick school building was built there to house St Peter's School (a predecessor of St Peter's College, Auckland). He founded Auckland's first school of art in 1878 and supported it for 11 years. He was a founder of Auckland Grammar School having become the third chairman of the school in 1879..

When depression overwhelmed Auckland in 1885 and the Stock Market collapsed in 1886, there began a desperate struggle for financial survival. Campbell sold several businesses and properties, concentrating his energies on Brown Campbell and Company, a brewery and liquor importer. Campbell retained his properties at One Tree Hill partly because he wanted to create a suitable residence for his family. He envisaged an Italianate mansion similar to James Williamson's at Hillsborough, surrounded by an elegant estate. He set about planting trees to create a suitable landscape garden.

His wife Emma, however, had other ideas and the house, Killbryde, was eventually built in Parnell, a location much more handy to town. This property is now part of the Parnell Rose Gardens and Dove Myer Robinson Park. The house was demolished in 1924. In his later years, Campbell was concerned about the increasing suburban development of Auckland and decided to donate his remaining farmland at One Tree Hill to the city as a public amenity to be called Corinth Park – named after a part of Greece which Campbell had admired on his travels.

Winifred the only surviving child of John and Emma Campbell married Herbert Cyril Orde Murray a lieutenant in the 1st Gloucestershire Regiment on 10 December 1889.

The presentation of the park would probably have taken place after Campbell's death in the form of a bequest had not providence intervened in the form of the Royal Tour of 1901.

== Cornwall Park ==
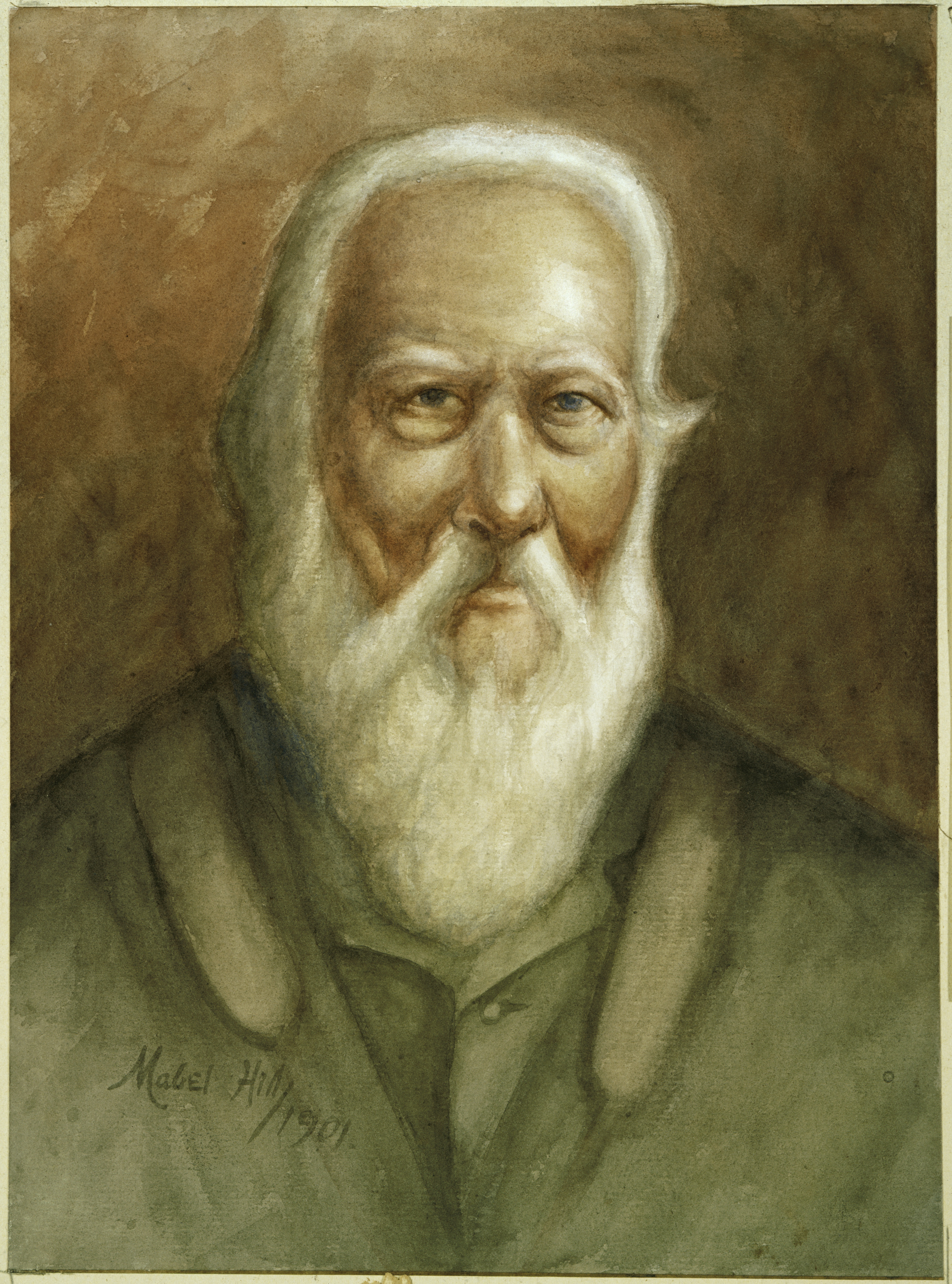
His Worship the Mayor of Auckland, Dr J Logan Campbell; painted in 1901 by Mabel Hill

In early 1901, Campbell was approached to be Mayor of Auckland for the royal visit by the Duke and Duchess of Cornwall in June that year. Aged 83 and long been in retirement, Campbell agreed on the proviso that he would fulfil representative functions only and step down after the visit, with a deputy undertaken most of the mayoral tasks. In the April 1901 mayoral election, he received nearly 80% of the votes. During the royal visit, Logan Campbell donated Cornwall Park to the people of New Zealand and named it after the Duke and Duchess. Campbell resigned in July and the city councillors voted Alfred Kidd into the role; Kidd had acted in support of Campbell and taken on many of the mayoral tasks.

== Later life, death, and legacy ==
Campbell was made a knight bachelor on 14 August 1902, after the honour had been announced in the 1902 Coronation Honours list published on 26 June 1902. He lived long enough to witness the erection of the bronze statue of him in Mayoral Robes at the Manukau Road entrance to Cornwall Park. He died on 22 June 1912, and is buried on the summit of Maungakiekie One Tree Hill, adjacent to Cornwall Park. Auckland Grammar students formed part of the procession at Campbell’s funeral on 4 July 1912. He advised his closest advisors of his wish to erect a monument to demonstrate his love and regard for the Māori people and allocated funds for it in his will and Trust Deeds for the formation of his Residuary Estate to continue to distribute funds for charities for relief of poverty, advancement of education and support of the cultural and medical interests he supported in his life time. The Trustees of his estate sought permission from Iwi throughout the Auckland Provincial region for his burial on the tihi summit and later for the building of the obelisk, which commenced in the 1930s to be complete by 1940 as a bicentennial project supported by the Government of the day. As it was completed during World War Two, the official dedication was delayed as the Maori elders did not wish to formally dedicate it during a time of bloodshed in line with tikanga. Sir John Logan Campbell's grave is located in the middle of the flat platform which is part of a structure supporting the obelisk complex, built of local volcanic basalt, which serves as the forecourt to the monument. The epitaph for Sir John Logan Campbell is taken from Christopher Wren's grave at St Paul's Cathedral, London, the bronze plaque on the grave reads in Latin; ''Si monumentum requiris circumspice," – translating to ''If you would seek my monument, look around you.''

In 1997, Campbell was posthumously inducted into the New Zealand Business Hall of Fame.

== Sir John Logan Campbell Papers ==
The Sir John Logan Campbell Papers constitutes a record across almost all of the nineteenth century. John Logan Campbell's personal papers and those of his business enterprises reflect both business and social history from the 1840s to 1910. The collection is fundamental to research into the earliest origins of Auckland’s European settlement and the development of the provincial economy. The papers record a range of activities, events and business across the Auckland Province, also include "Reminiscences" of his time in Europe, India, the Near East, Scotland. There is also a section containing papers of his wife Lady Emma Campbell and daughter Winifred. Campbell’s gift of land and income attest to his efforts to secure and transform his farm estate into a public park gifted to the people of New Zealand in 1901. The collection includes the Cornwall Park Trust Board developments and management of this major city asset.

The Sir John Logan Campbell Papers MS-51 are held at the Auckland War Memorial Museum, and were added to the UNESCO Memory of the World Aotearoa New Zealand Ngā Mahara o te Ao register in 2016.

== Related material ==
- Cornwall Park, Auckland, NZ.../ [Plan] designed by Austin Strong, Landscape architect... [Call No. G9081.G46A8:O2]. Auckland War Memorial Museum Tāmaki Paenga Hira.
- Campbell and Ehrenfried Company Limited. Records. Auckland Libraries Ngā Pātaka Kōrero o Tāmaki Makaurau [Call No. NZMS 1423].
- The papers of Winifred Humphreys daughter of John Logan and Emma Campbell, held at the National Library of New Zealand Te Puna Mātauranga o Aotearoa.

== Notes ==
Political offices
Preceded by William Brown	Superintendent of Auckland Province; 1855–1856	Succeeded by John Williamson
Preceded by David Goldie	Mayor of Auckland City; 1901	Succeeded by Alfred Kidd
New Zealand Parliament
Preceded by Joseph Hargreaves	Member of Parliament for Suburbs of Auckland; 1860; Served alongside: Theophilus Heale	Constituency abolished
