= Coromandel, New Zealand =

Town in Waikato, New Zealand

Coromandel Kapanga (Māori)
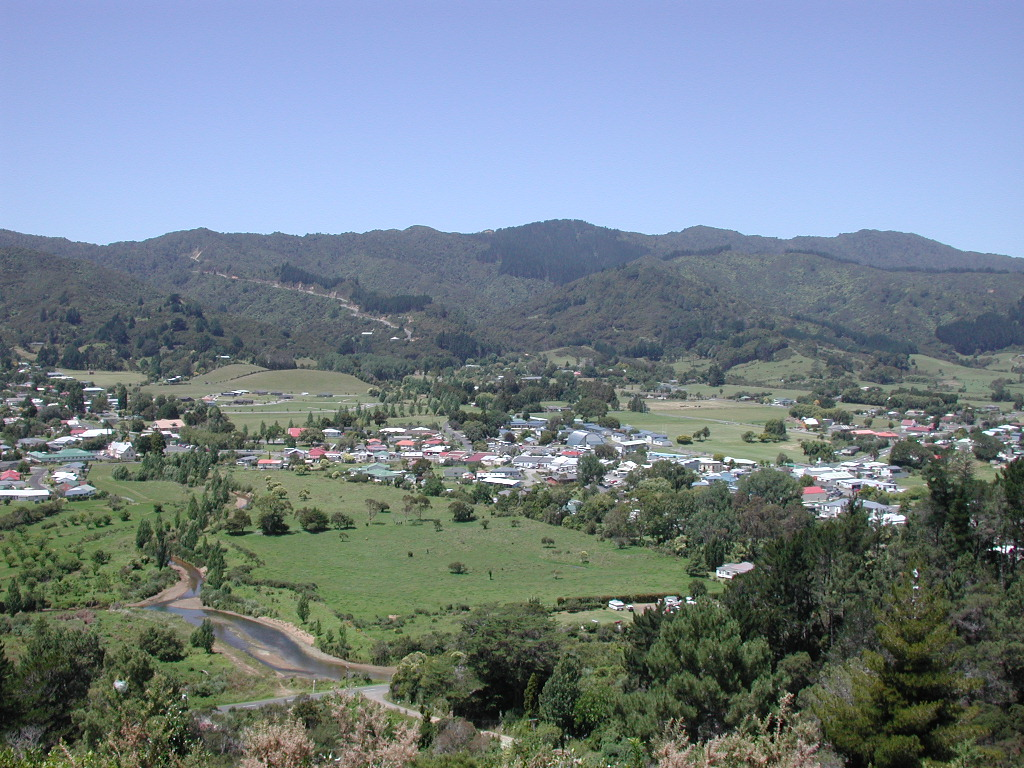
- Coromandel town
- Interactive map of Coromandel
- Coordinates: 36°45′18″S 175°30′8″E
- Country: New Zealand
- Region: Waikato
- District: Thames-Coromandel District
- Ward: Coromandel-Colville ward
- Community Board: Coromandel-Colville Community
- Electorates: Coromandel; Hauraki-Waikato (Māori)

Government
  - Council: Thames-Coromandel District Council
  - Regional council: Waikato Regional Council
  - Mayor of Thames-Coromandel: Peter Revell
  - Coromandel MP: Scott Simpson
  - Hauraki-Waikato MP: Hana-Rawhiti Maipi-Clarke

Area
  - Total: 10.89 km^{2} (4.20 sq mi)

Population (June 2025)
  - Total: 1,780
  - Density: 163/km^{2} (423/sq mi)
- Postcode(s): 3506

Coromandel, (Māori: Kapanga) also called Coromandel Town to distinguish it from the wider district, is a town on the Coromandel Harbour, on the western side of the Coromandel Peninsula, which is in the North Island of New Zealand. It is 75 kilometres east of the city of Auckland, although the road between them, which winds around the Firth of Thames and Hauraki Gulf coasts, is 190 km long. The population was 1,780 as of June 2025.

The town was named after HMS Coromandel, which sailed into the harbour in 1820. At one time Coromandel Harbour was a major port serving the region's gold mining and kauri industries. Today, the town's main industries are tourism and mussel farming.

Coromandel Harbour is a wide bay on the Hauraki Gulf guarded by several islands, the largest of which is Whanganui Island. The town and environs are a popular summer holiday destination for New Zealanders. Coromandel Town is noted for its artists, crafts, alternative lifestylers, mussel farming, and recreational fishing. One of the most popular tourist attractions is the Driving Creek Railway.

== Demographics ==
Coromandel covers 10.89 km^{2} (4.20 sq mi) and had an estimated population of 1,780 as of June 2025, with a population density of 163 people per km^{2}.

Historical population
Year	Pop.	±% p.a.
2006	1,494	—
2013	1,518	+0.23%
2018	1,743	+2.80%
2023	1,782	+0.44%

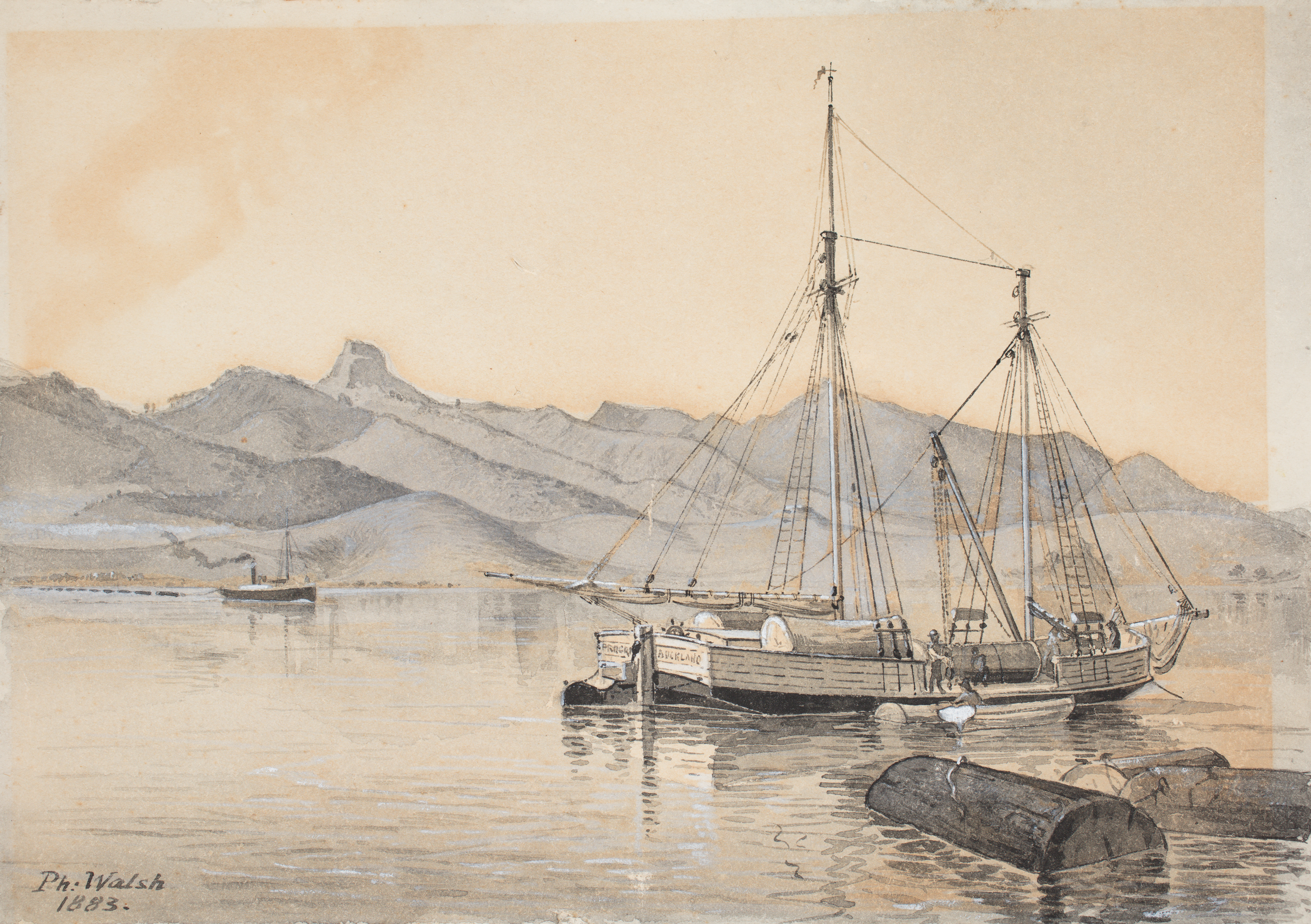
1883 painting of the Coromandel Harbour by Philip Walsh

Coromandel had a population of 1,782 in the 2023 New Zealand census, an increase of 39 people (2.2%) since the 2018 census, and an increase of 264 people (17.4%) since the 2013 census. There were 873 males, 903 females and 3 people of other genders in 771 dwellings. 3.0% of people identified as LGBTIQ+. The median age was 56.9 years (compared with 38.1 years nationally). There were 219 people (12.3%) aged under 15 years, 210 (11.8%) aged 15 to 29, 723 (40.6%) aged 30 to 64, and 630 (35.4%) aged 65 or older.

People could identify as more than one ethnicity. The results were 85.5% European (Pākehā); 29.8% Māori; 2.4% Pasifika; 2.2% Asian; 0.2% Middle Eastern, Latin American and African New Zealanders (MELAA); and 2.0% other, which includes people giving their ethnicity as "New Zealander". English was spoken by 98.3%, Māori language by 7.7%, and other languages by 5.2%. No language could be spoken by 1.2% (e.g. too young to talk). New Zealand Sign Language was known by 0.7%. The percentage of people born overseas was 14.8, compared with 28.8% nationally.

Religious affiliations were 21.5% Christian, 0.2% Hindu, 0.2% Islam, 2.4% Māori religious beliefs, 1.2% Buddhist, 0.7% New Age, and 1.9% other religions. People who answered that they had no religion were 65.3%, and 6.9% of people did not answer the census question.

Of those at least 15 years old, 234 (15.0%) people had a bachelor's or higher degree, 846 (54.1%) had a post-high school certificate or diploma, and 480 (30.7%) people exclusively held high school qualifications. The median income was $28,300, compared with $41,500 nationally. 75 people (4.8%) earned over $100,000 compared to 12.1% nationally. The employment status of those at least 15 was that 534 (34.2%) people were employed full-time, 216 (13.8%) were part-time, and 51 (3.3%) were unemployed.

== Modern history ==
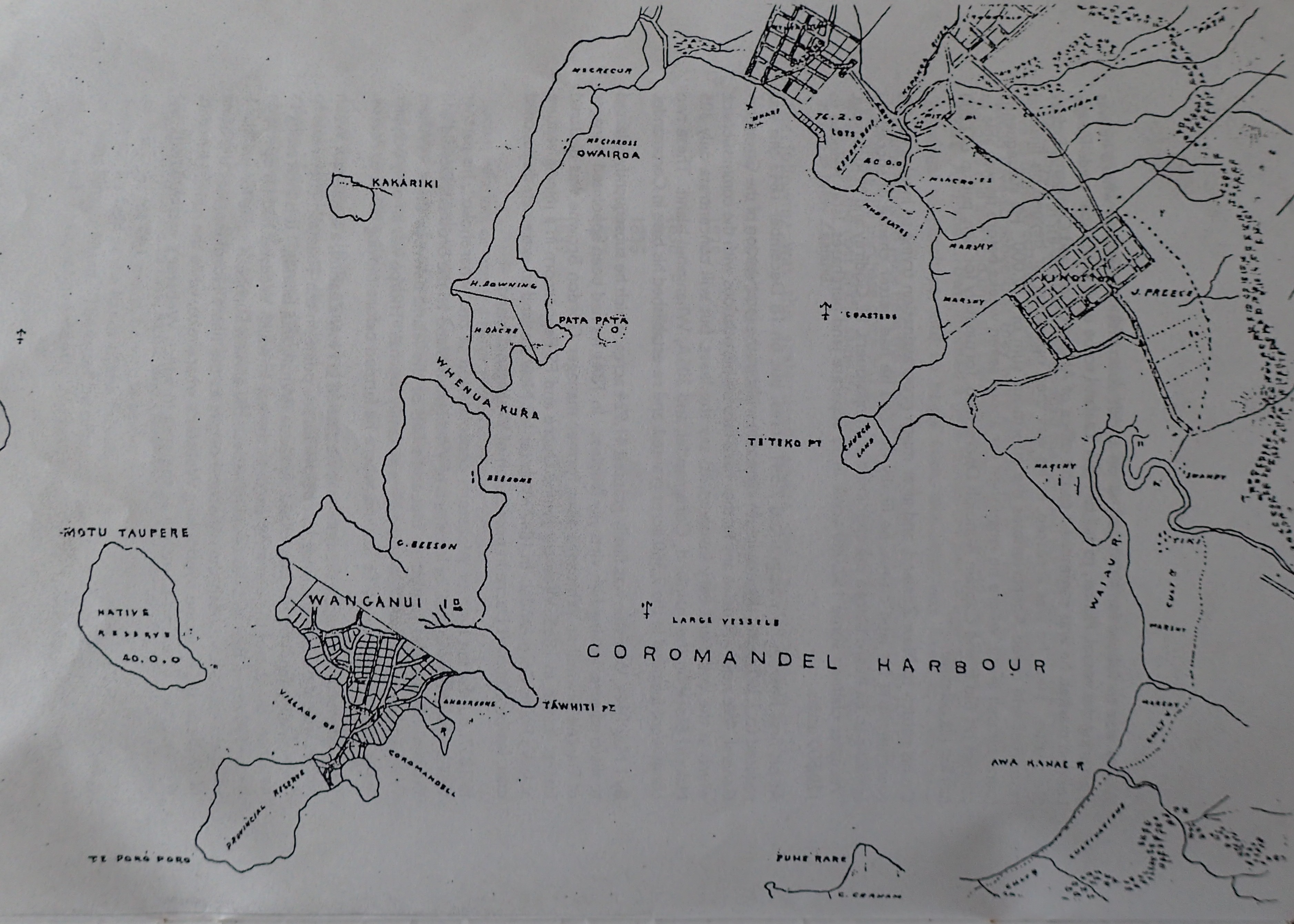
The name "Coromandel Town" is written on the plan of Whanganui Island.

The original Government plan for the town of Coromandel was for it to be built on Whanganui Island. Plans were drawn up and sections were sold but the plan was unsuccessful, in part because the land was too steep and there was no suitable fresh water source. Most of the sections were abandoned and purchased by the Government. The town was then established where it is today.

== Education ==
Coromandel Area School (Te Kura a Rohe o Waiau) is a co-educational state composite (years 1–13) school with a roll of 212 as of July 2026. The school traces its history to the opening of Coromandel School in 1875.

Coromandel Rudolf Steiner School was a small private full primary (years 1–8) school. It closed at the end of 2007.

== Marae ==
The local Manaia Marae and Te Kou o Rehua meeting house, are a meeting ground for the Ngāti Pūkenga iwi, and its Ngāti Maru hapū.

In October 2020, the Government committed $276,216 from the Provincial Growth Fund to upgrade the marae, creating an estimated 8 jobs.

The Old Coromandel Hospital is a meeting place for Te Patukirikiri iwi.

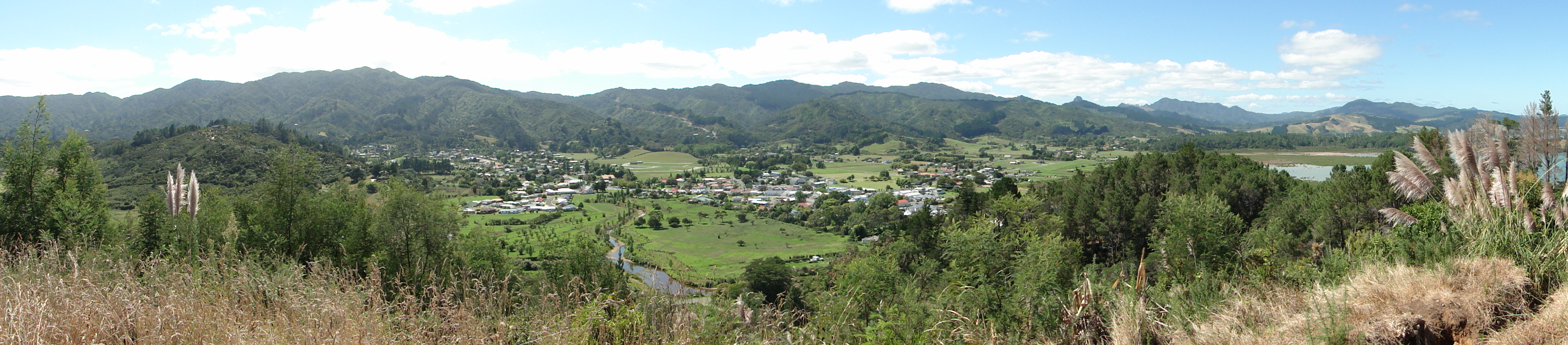
Panoramic view of the town from a lookout in the Kauri Block

== Climate ==
Climate data for Coromandel (1981–2010)
Month	Jan	Feb	Mar	Apr	May	Jun	Jul	Aug	Sep	Oct	Nov	Dec	Year
Mean daily maximum °C (°F)	23.7 (74.7)	23.9 (75.0)	22.6 (72.7)	20.2 (68.4)	17.7 (63.9)	15.5 (59.9)	14.7 (58.5)	15.2 (59.4)	16.7 (62.1)	18.1 (64.6)	20.0 (68.0)	22.1 (71.8)	19.2 (66.6)
Daily mean °C (°F)	19.2 (66.6)	19.6 (67.3)	18.1 (64.6)	15.9 (60.6)	13.7 (56.7)	11.6 (52.9)	10.7 (51.3)	11.2 (52.2)	12.6 (54.7)	14.1 (57.4)	15.8 (60.4)	17.8 (64.0)	15.0 (59.1)
Mean daily minimum °C (°F)	14.7 (58.5)	15.3 (59.5)	13.6 (56.5)	11.6 (52.9)	9.8 (49.6)	7.7 (45.9)	6.6 (43.9)	7.3 (45.1)	8.6 (47.5)	10.1 (50.2)	11.6 (52.9)	13.5 (56.3)	10.9 (51.6)
Average rainfall mm (inches)	112.8 (4.44)	155.9 (6.14)	156.2 (6.15)	184.1 (7.25)	138.1 (5.44)	192.4 (7.57)	215.3 (8.48)	212.0 (8.35)	186.0 (7.32)	142.6 (5.61)	146.6 (5.77)	150.5 (5.93)	1,992.5 (78.45)
Source: NIWA
