= January 1860 Suburbs of Auckland by-election =

New Zealand by-election

The January 1860 Suburbs of Auckland by-election was a New Zealand by-election held in the Suburbs of Auckland electorate following the resignation of Walter Brodie. He was replaced by Theophilus Heale unopposed.

The Suburbs of Auckland electorate was one of the original 24 electorates used for the 1st New Zealand Parliament in 1853 and existed until the end of the term of the 2nd New Zealand Parliament in 1860. It was a two-member electorate.

Brodie resigned on 6 December 1859 and was replaced on 25 January by Heale.
