= Joseph Hargreaves (New Zealand politician) =

New Zealand politician

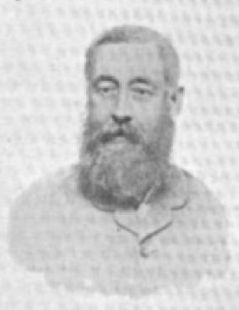
Joseph Hargreaves

New Zealand Parliament
Years	Term	Electorate	Party
1860	2nd	Suburbs of Auckland	Independent

Joseph Hargreaves (1821 – 10 April 1880) was a 19th-century member of parliament from Auckland, New Zealand.

Born in Liverpool in 1821, Hargreaves represented the Suburbs of Auckland electorate in 1860, from 5 April (elected in the electorate's second by-election that year) to 24 July, when he resigned on private grounds. John Logan Campbell was elected unopposed (in the electorate's third by-election that year) to fill the vacancy. He died on 10 April 1880.

Hargreaves was married to a daughter (Note: Some sources list her as a sister of Spain but that is incorrect.) of William Spain, who had been appointed in 1841 as a New Zealand Land Claims Commissioner and had lived in the country until 1845. His wife died on 2 October 1910, aged 84.

== Footnotes ==
New Zealand Parliament
Preceded by Frederick Merriman	Member of Parliament for Suburbs of Auckland; 1860; Served alongside: Theophilus Heale	Succeeded by John Logan Campbell
