= William Field Porter =

New Zealand politician (1784–1869)

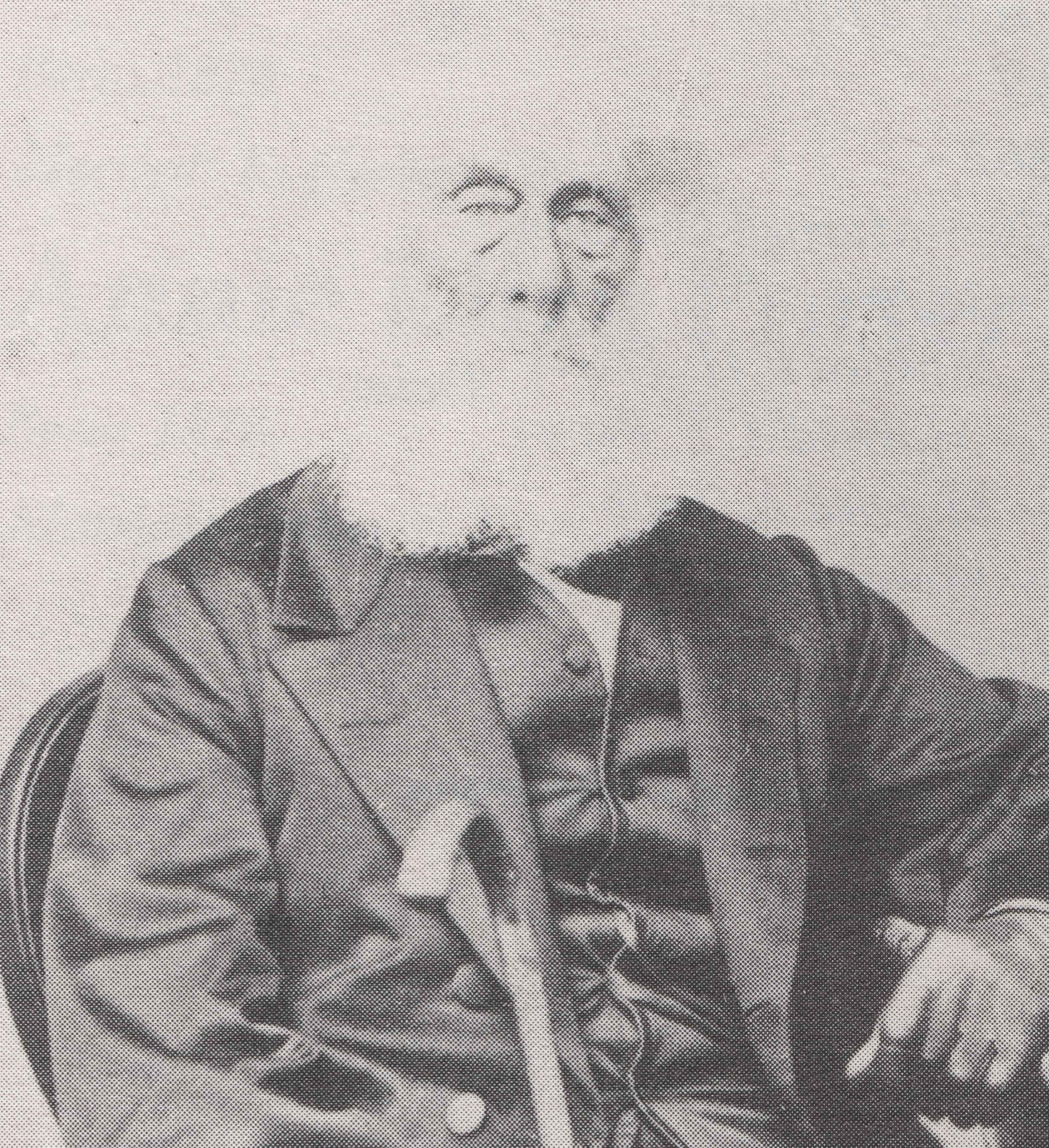
William Field Porter, c. 1865

William Field Porter (24 January 1784 – 30 March 1869) was a ship owner from Liverpool, who migrated to South Australia in 1838. He relocated to Auckland in 1841, where he became a member of the New Zealand Parliament.

== Early life ==
Porter was born in London in 1784. He was orphaned by 1796 and it is likely he commenced his career at sea shortly after. His first command was Tiger, sailing in the Liverpool to Barbados trade. Her owners, Barton, Irlam and Higginson specialised in that trade. Later, in the War of 1812, Tiger, still under Porter's command, was granted a letter of marque to operate offensively, not just defensively, against American shipping. Tiger, in company with Maxwell, also a vessel that Barton, Irlam and Higginson owned, captured three American ships in 1813 as the two British ships were returning to England from Barbados.

In 1810, he married Alice Roper (1790–1862) in Liverpool, with whom he had four children. His only daughter, Alice, married fellow coastal trader John Salmon in 1853.

On 29 November 1811 Captain Porter stood trial at London for having taken on board Tiger at Carlisle Bay, Barbados, two deserters from the Royal Navy and having concealed them when the Navy sent a Lieutenant to look for them. (Apparently he had concealed more than two, but the charges only related to two.) Porter was found guilty and fined £500 and to be held at Newgate for 12 months or until he had paid his fine. It is not clear who paid the fine, if they did, and whether Porter spent any time in prison.

Porter became a prominent sea captain, operating a small fleet out of his own yard at Liverpool. Other members of the Porter family sailed for the British East India Company (e.g. his cousin, George Porter).

== Australia ==
In the late 1830s he suffered substantial losses at sea, which his son said were behind his decision to migrate. Porter sold his shipyard in Liverpool and took two of his ships, Porter, and Dorset, provisioned with livestock and a range of personnel (including a doctor, tutors and servants), so that he could set up a relatively self-sufficient farming station in South Australia. He was accompanied by his wife, a son and daughter, William and Alice and an adult son Richard and his wife.

Porter himself captained his namesake, Porter (a 252-ton (bm) brig), which he had built in 1824 and which had been strengthened so that it would be fit for the hazardous voyage. Upon arrival, he used this vessel to set up a shipping service from Port Lincoln and Adelaide to and from other Australian ports. Porter also built Dorset (95 tons) in 1838, specifically as a back-up ship for the journey to Australia. This he sold upon arrival.

Porter's expedition arrived at Adelaide in early 1839. A special survey was authorised by the Governor for Port Lincoln on the Eyre Peninsula and Porter was an investor in the survey company that took out the licence. He received land there as a consequence. The Porter moved the family to this new settlement in 1839. The Dorset by now in other ownership brought other settlers. The party was just one of three to arrive with settlers for the district in the 1830s and 1840s. It became apparent to him that Adelaide would be the main settlement in South Australia and that immediate prospects for Port Lincoln would be limited. Impatient for success, he decided to forego the significant investment and effort he had made in the fledgling settlement (e.g. building a house, establishing a bank and donating to a proposed Church of England). He abandoned the settlement in 1840. Although Porter's tenure in Port Lincoln only lasted 18 months, he had, nevertheless, been appointed the first Magistrate of the Eyre Peninsula and his family left its name at 'Porter Bay'.

== New Zealand ==
New Zealand Parliament
Years	Term	Electorate	Party
1853–1855	1st	Suburbs of Auckland	Independent

In May 1841, Porter arrived in Auckland, New Zealand. He built a house and store on Auckland's waterfront and commenced trading from there with stock brought on the Porter. He also invested in land in and around Auckland and bought interests in land claims from before 1840. Later he developed a farm at Kohimarama.

In 1841 Governor Willam Hobson appointed Porter to his first Legislative Council, a small body with only an advisory role. Here Porter was closely involved in early attempts to deal with land claims from before 1840, a central issue in the early governance of New Zealand.

Porter served in the 1st New Zealand Parliament as representative for the Suburbs of Auckland electorate from 1853 to 1855, when he retired, but did not serve in any further Parliaments. He also served on the Auckland Provincial Council. He was on the first Council of the Auckland Museum.

Porter died on 30 March 1869 at Mangatangi, Waikato.

== Notes ==
New Zealand Parliament
New constituency	Member of Parliament for Suburbs of Auckland; 1853–1855; Served alongside: Frederick Merriman	Succeeded by Walter Brodie
