= Dorset (1838 ship) =

History

United Kingdom
- Name: Dorset
- Owner: 1838: William Porter
- Builder: William Porter, Liverpool
- Launched: 1838
- Fate: Wrecked 1852

General characteristics
- Type: Brig
- Tons burthen: 81 (bm)
- Length: 73.8 feet (22.5 m)
- Beam: 15.8 feet (4.8 m)
- Draught: 9.2 feet (2.8 m)
- Propulsion: Sail

Dorset was a merchant ship built by William Porter at Liverpool, England in 1838. She made a number of voyages around the south east coast of Australia with cargo and undertook one voyage transporting 9 male convicts to New South Wales.

== Career ==
Under the command of John Mackie, she sailed from Port Adelaide on 20 November 1840 and arrived at Sydney on 1 December 1840. She carried passengers and embarked 9 male convicts under the command of three constables.

Dorset departed Port Jackson on 14 December 1840, bound for Port Phillip, with passengers.

== Fate ==
While sailing under the command of Captain Birdwood from Hobart to Melbourne, she was wrecked upon the Kent Group in Bass Strait on 28 May 1852. There were no deaths.
