= Frederick Merriman (politician) =

New Zealand politician (1818–1865)

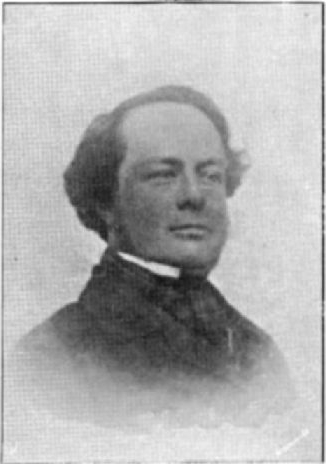
- Frederick Merriman

1st Chairman of Committees
- In office 1854–1855
- Preceded by: New role
- Succeeded by: Hugh Carleton

Member of the New Zealand Parliament for Suburbs of Auckland
- In office 1853–1860

Personal details
- Born: 18 October 1818 Marlborough, England
- Died: 21 July 1865 (aged 46) Parnell, New Zealand
- Resting place: Symonds Street Cemetery
- Party: Independent
- Relations: Nathaniel Merriman (brother)

Frederick Ward Merriman (18 October 1818 – 21 July 1865), generally called Frederick Merriman, was a 19th-century New Zealand politician.

== Early life ==
Merriman was born in Marlborough, Wiltshire, England, on 18 October 1818. His father was the lawyer Thomas Merriman (1771–1841), and his mother was Mary Clarke (1780 – after 1837). He was their eleventh child out of a total of 14 (nine boys, five girls). He was educated at Winchester. He was admitted to the bar and emigrated to Auckland in New Zealand in 1844.

His brother Nathaniel later became Bishop of Grahamstown.

On 4 May 1850, he married Susannah Augusta Atkyns (née Greene) in St. Paul's Church, Auckland. She was the widow of Captain Ringrose Atkyns.

Merriman was a Freemason. He was initiated in the Ara Lodge in 1849 and became their treasurer.

== Professional career ==
He commenced practice as a solicitor in the year of his arrival in Auckland. In 1856, he was joined by Samuel Jackson, and the firm became known as Merriman and Jackson. Upon Merriman's death, the firm was joined by James Russell and was renamed Jackson Russell. It is still known by this name today.

From 1856 to 1861, Merriman was Provincial Land Officer for the Provincial Council. After that, he was Crown Solicitor until his death.

He was elected vice-president of Auckland's first Law Society in 1860.

== Political career ==
New Zealand Parliament
Years	Term	Electorate	Party
1853–1855	1st	Suburbs of Auckland	Independent
1855–1860	2nd	Suburbs of Auckland	Independent

Merriman was appointed to the earlier Legislative Council (1841–1853) on 9 August 1847. That council was abolished in 1853 by the New Zealand Constitution Act 1852, but Merriman's retirement date is not listed.

Merriman was elected to the 1st New Zealand Parliament in 1853, representing the Suburbs of Auckland electorate, and was re-elected for the 2nd New Zealand Parliament. He resigned from Parliament on 13 March 1860. He was elected by the house as its first Chairman of Committees on 21 June 1854 and he held this role for all three sessions of the 1st Parliament.

He served on the second and third Auckland Provincial Council, representing the Suburbs of Auckland electorate. He was first elected on 26 October 1855 and served until 18 August 1857, the date of dissolution of the second council. He was re-elected on 7 October 1857 and served until 12 September 1861, the date of dissolution of the third council. He was twice on its executive council, first from December 1856 (no end date given) and then from February to July 1857.

== Death ==
Merriman had been ill for four months when he died at his residence in Parnell on 21 July 1865. He was buried at the Symonds Street Cemetery the following day. His wife died in 1868.

== Notes ==
Political offices
New creation	Chairman of Committees of the House of Representatives; 1854–1855	Succeeded by Hugh Carleton
New Zealand Parliament
New constituency	Member of Parliament for Suburbs of Auckland; 1853–1860; Served alongside: William Field Porter, Walter Brodie, Theophilus Heale	Succeeded by Joseph Hargreaves
