= Walter Brodie =

New Zealand politician

New Zealand Parliament
Years	Term	Electorate	Party
1855–1859	2nd	Suburbs of Auckland	Independent

Walter Brodie (1811 – 11 September 1884) was a New Zealand politician in Auckland, on both provincial and national level.

== Biography ==
Brodie was born in 1811 in Eastbourne, East Sussex, England, as the sixth of twelve children. His mother was Anna Brodie (1779–1864), the daughter of The Times founder John Walter. His father was Revd Dr Alexander Brodie DD (1773–1828). His parents had married in 1802, and his father had become the Reverend at St Mary's, Eastbourne, in 1809. His grandfather died in 1812, the year after Brodie was born, and his mother inherited 2/16ths of the shares in The Times; the same proportion went to her sister Mary Carden. In 1821, the two sisters and their respective husbands signed an affidavit that clarified that the shares were held by the daughters of The Times founder, and were not the property shared with their husbands. His father died in 1828.

Brodie emigrated to the colony in the early 1840s. He returned to England in 1844 and published a book on his experience of New Zealand colonial life titled Remarks on the Past and Present State of New Zealand.

Brodie returned to New Zealand, by way of Pitcairn.

In 1851, he imported English pheasants (Phasianus colchicus) and released them at Mongonui. At around the same time, Thomas Henderson imported Chinese pheasants (Phasianus colchicus torquatus) and released them on his property on his property, now known as the Auckland suburb of Henderson. Pheasants became common game birds in the North Island. Brodie also imported sparrows into New Zealand.

He represented the Suburbs of Auckland electorate in the 2nd New Zealand Parliament, but resigned before the end of his term on 6 December 1859. He did not serve in any subsequent Parliaments. He also participated in Auckland provincial politics, representing the Suburbs of Auckland electorate in 1855–1857.

Upon receiving his inheritance, which included his mother's shareholding in The Times, Brodie returned to England with his wife and daughter around 1870. His daughter Josephine married George Daniel Moore at Holy Trinity, Paddington, on 1 July 1870.

Brodie visited Auckland again in December 1878. He died in England on 11 September 1884.

== Notes ==
New Zealand Parliament
Preceded by William Field Porter	Member of Parliament for Suburbs of Auckland; 1855–1859; Served alongside: Frederick Merriman	Succeeded by Theophilus Heale
