= Suburbs of Auckland (electorate) =

Suburbs of Auckland was a parliamentary electorate in Auckland, New Zealand, from 1853 to 1860.

== Population centres ==
Suburbs of Auckland covered the area close and adjacent to the city of Auckland. Those suburbs were east, south and west of the city and covered Parnell, Newmarket, Grey Lynn, and Ponsonby. To the east, the Suburbs of Auckland electorate bordered the Southern Division electorate. To the south and west, the boundary was with the Northern Division electorate. In the north, the Suburbs of Auckland electorate wrapped itself around the City of Auckland electorate or it bordered onto the Waitemata Harbour. For the 1853 general election, there were 163 electors on the roll. This had increased to 325 electors for the 1855 general election.

== History ==
The electorate was represented by six members of parliament. The 1853 nomination meetings for the City of Auckland, Suburbs of Auckland, and Northern Division electorates were all held at the Market Place in Shortland Street in Auckland city. At the nomination meeting on 10 August 1853, Frederick Merriman and William Field Porter were proposed. As two positions had to be filled, they were declared elected unopposed.

The 1855 nomination meetings for the City of Auckland, Suburbs of Auckland, and Northern Division electorates were all held opposite the court house, one after the other, on 16 October. There were four candidates for the two positions, and a poll was held on 27 October. Merriman, the only incumbent to stand, topped the poll, and the other successful candidate was Walter Brodie.

Brodie resigned on 6 December 1859. Hargreaves was elected on 5 April 1860, and resigned on 24 July 1860. He was replaced by Campbell, who was returned unopposed on 4 August 1860. Merriman resigned on 13 March 1860.

=== Members ===
The electorate existed for the 1st and 2nd Parliament as a two-member electorate.

Election	Winners	
1853 election	Frederick Merriman	William Field Porter
1855 election	Frederick Merriman	Walter Brodie
January 1860 by-election	Frederick Merriman	Theophilus Heale
April 1860 by-election	Joseph Hargreaves	Theophilus Heale
August 1860 by-election	John Logan Campbell	Theophilus Heale

== Election results ==
=== 1855 election ===
1855 general election: Suburbs of Auckland
Party	Candidate	Votes	%	±%
Independent	Frederick Merriman	124	54.75	
Independent	Walter Brodie	118	52.10	
Independent	William Turner	112	49.45	
Independent	Dr Daniel Pollen	99	43.71	
Majority		6	2.65	
Turnout		227 (Note: Each elector had two votes. Turnout is assumed to be the number of votes cast divided by two. This is an approximation as some electors would have cast one vote only.)	69.69	
Registered electors		325		
