= Theophilus Heale =

New Zealand politician and surveyor (1816–1885)

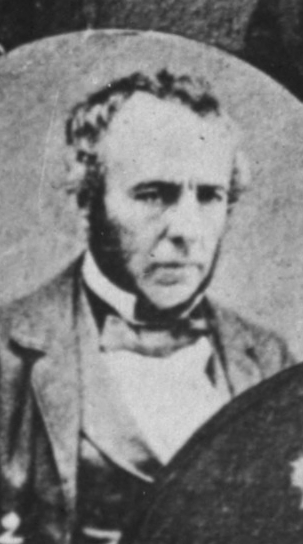
Heale in 1860

Theophilus Heale (1816–1885) was a 19th-century British Pākehā settler, later a Member of Parliament from Auckland, New Zealand.

== Biography ==
New Zealand Parliament
Years	Term	Electorate	Party
1860	2nd	Suburbs of Auckland	Independent

Heale was the captain part-owner of one of the first British migrant ships to arrive in Wellington.

During the 1830s and 1840s, Heale was one of the investors in the failed logging and trading colony established at Cornwallis, New Zealand.

Heale sailed from New Zealand to America to investigate the latest milling techniques, and later to England to purchase equipment for the venture. The settlement was established in 1840, however due to problems with land ownership and the high cost of milling kauri wood in the Waitākere Ranges, the settlement struggled. After the death of William Cornwallis Symonds in 1841, Heale became the main representative for the Cornwallis company in 1843, however the settlement continued to struggle. By the 1860s, Heale salvaged the boiler from the Cornwallis steam mill and repurposed it for the Kawau Island copper mine.

He represented the Suburbs of Auckland electorate in 1860, from 25 January (elected in the electorate's first by-election that year) to 5 November, when he was defeated for Parnell. He had been chief surveyor for the Southland and Auckland Provincial Councils, and a judge of the Native Land Court. He died at Orpington, Kent, England.

New Zealand Parliament
Preceded by Walter Brodie	Member of Parliament for Suburbs of Auckland; 1860; Served alongside: Frederick Merriman, Joseph Hargreaves, John Logan Campbell	Constituency abolished
