= August 1860 Suburbs of Auckland by-election =

New Zealand by-election

The August 1860 Suburbs of Auckland by-election was a New Zealand by-election held in the Suburbs of Auckland electorate following the resignation of Joseph Hargreaves. He was replaced by John Logan Campbell unopposed.

The Suburbs of Auckland electorate was one of the original 24 electorates used for the 1st New Zealand Parliament in 1853 and existed until the end of the term of the 2nd New Zealand Parliament in 1860. It was a two-member electorate.

Hargreaves resigned on 24 July 1860, and was replaced on 4 August by Campbell, who was known as the Father of Auckland.
