= Whanganui Island =

Island in New Zealand

- Interactive map of Whanganui Island

Geography
- Location: Hauraki Gulf
- Coordinates: 36°47′S 175°26′E
- Area: 2.83 km^{2} (1.09 sq mi)

Administration
- New Zealand

Demographics
- Population: ?

Whanganui Island is the largest of a small group of islands at the entrance to Coromandel harbour in the Hauraki Gulf, off the coast of New Zealand's North Island.

The island, which is privately owned, is 2.83 square kilometres (1.09 sq mi) in area. Much of it is farmed, but there are some forested areas.

== Early history ==
The ancient pā of Horokino (Herekino) situated at Arapaoa Bay (Homestead Bay) was captured by Tainui from the original inhabitants, Ngāti Huarere, and was one of several dotted around the perimeter of the Coromandel Harbour, then known as Waiau.

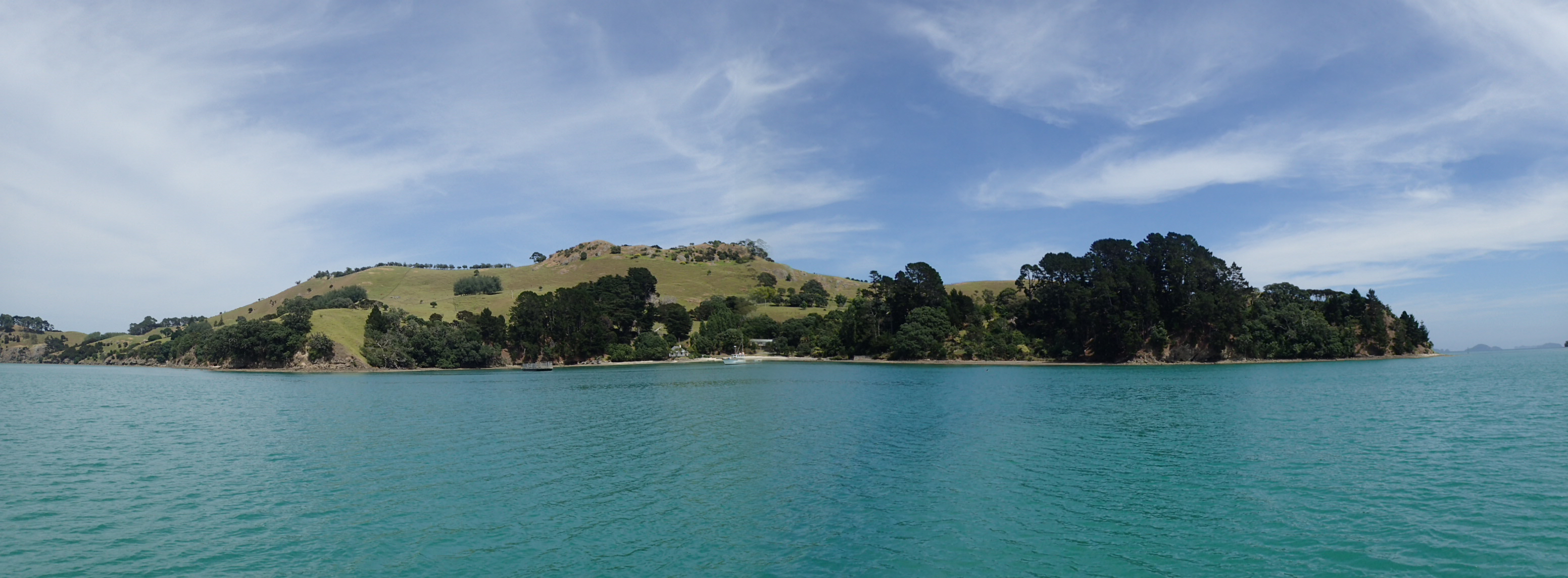
Horokino (Herekino) Pā situated at Arapaoa or Aropawa Bay (Homestead Bay) Whanganui Island

== Modern history ==
The geographic naming by both Māori and Pākehā has been subject to many changes over the history of the island and this makes the study of its history confusing.

The historian A. V. Piesse made a study of the names and seems to have arrived at a suitable summary. "The island is separated from the mainland by a narrow passage known as Whenuakura.The ancient name for the Island was Poroporo (according to Church Missionary Society catechist James Preece), later referred to by early settlers as Arapaoa, and then finally Whanganui Island (although originally as Wanganui Island). Also the Southernmost Point of the Island, now called Tawhiti Point was originally named Poroporo. Tawhiti Point was the name first used for the Northern end of Tawhiti (Woolshed) Bay, which is now called Rodney Point. The island was variously also named Beesons Island, Parker Island and Waiou.

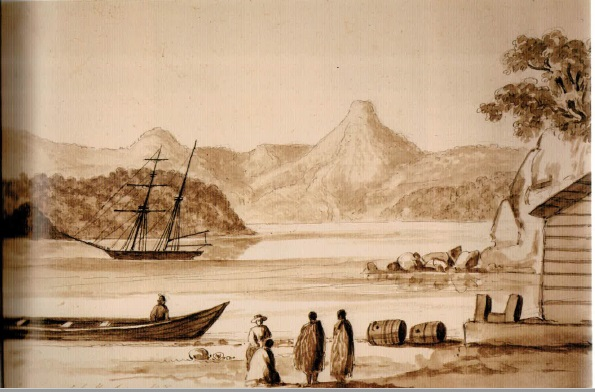
Arapaoa Bay Coromandel Harbour NZ, A sketch (1848?) by J J Merrett

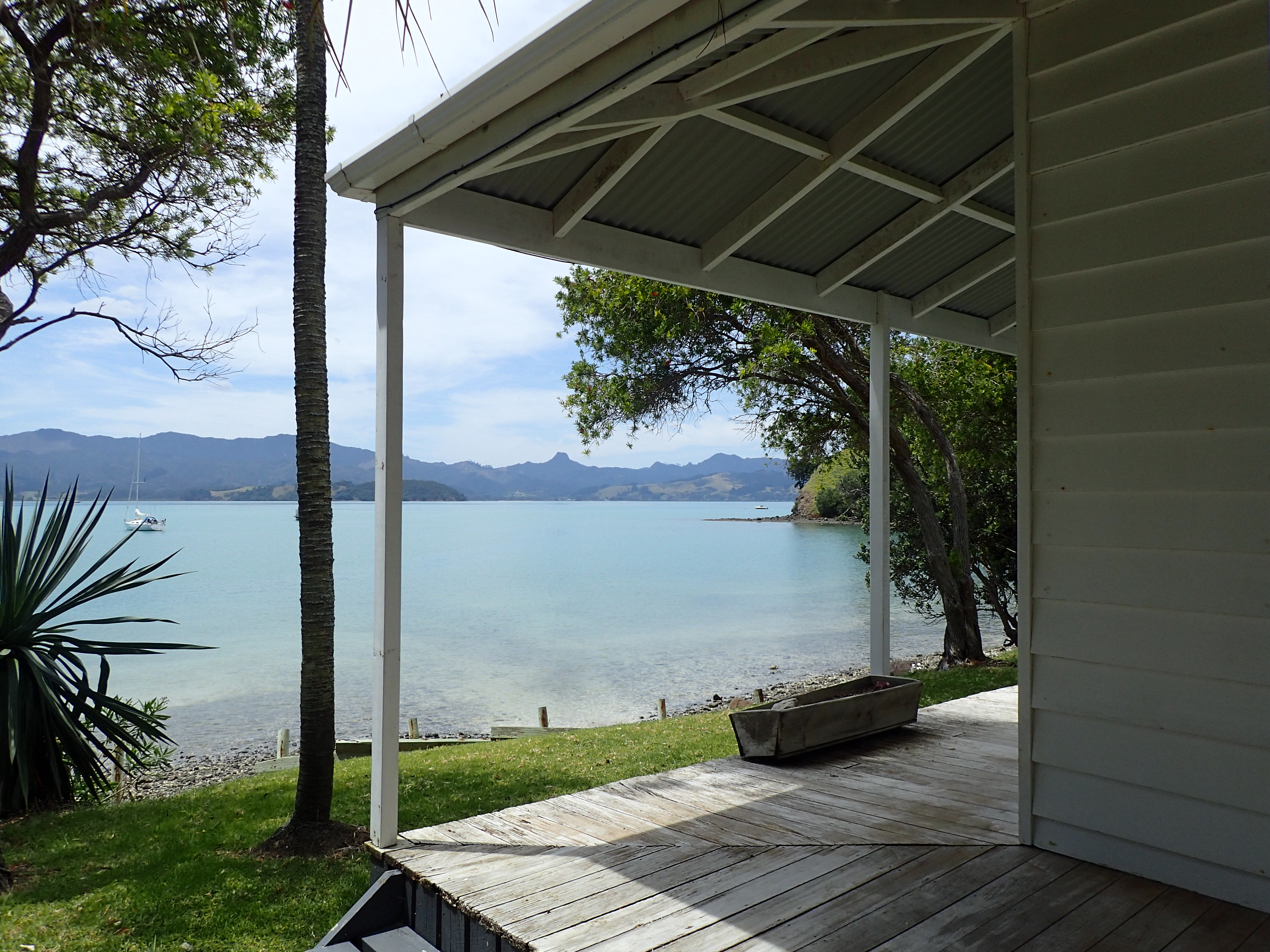
Arapaoa Bay from the house looking out onto the Coromandel Harbour. William Webster's base and John Logan Campbell's home for a period

American William Webster established a shipbuilding and trading enterprise on the island in 1836. He owned the island until the signing of the Treaty of Waitangi, when he lost legal title to the island as all titles passed to the British crown.

During the period of William Webster John Logan Campbell spent a period of time on Whanganui Island. There is a certain amount of confusion about where he stayed. Some say he lived at Timber (Woolshed) Bay and some say he stayed at the home at Arapaoa Bay. There was a good deal of shipbuilding activity in Timber (Woolshed) Bay and this was of primary interest to Campbell so it was possible that he stayed there. However Piesse for one includes a sketch of Campbell's "base" in his book and Campbell writes about his "Stay at Herekino" in his book "Poenamo"

== Town of Coromandel ==
Whanganui Island was the original site for the new Town of Coromandel. Plans were drawn up and sold in New Zealand and Britain.

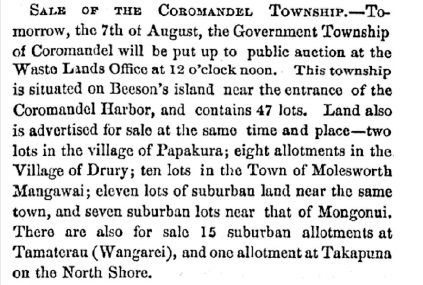
Sale of Sections at the new town of Coromandel on Whanganui Island beginning 7 August 1862

and sections were sold. The issue to the new owners was that the plan implied flattish land but the land was far from flat. There was also no suitable permanent source of fresh water.

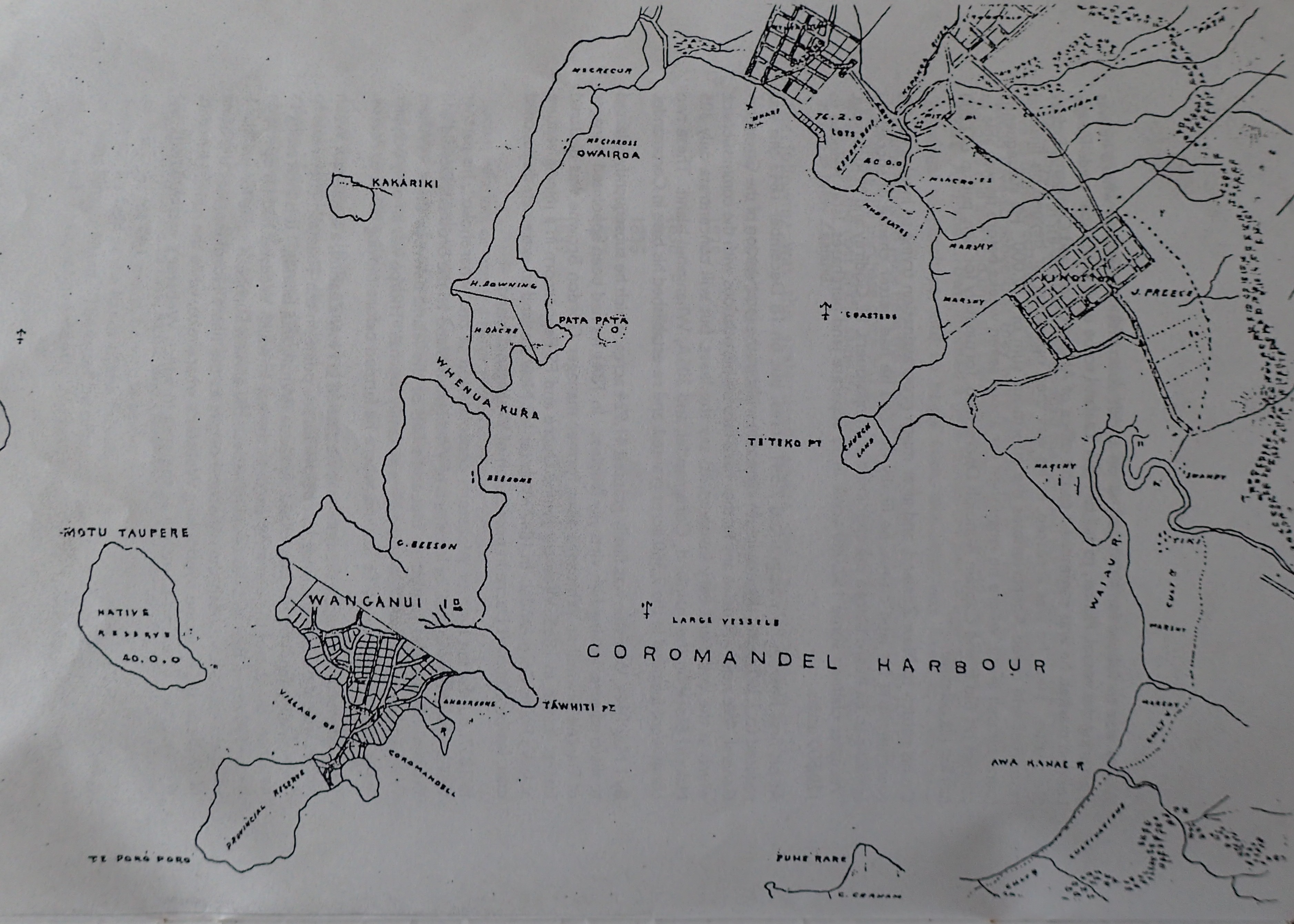
Name Coromandel Town written on Plan on Whanganui Island Aotearoa Original Plan including Kapanga

.The new owners abandoned their land and eventually the Crown bought all but two of the sections and helped the Settlers establish themselves in the mainland settlement of Kapanga (the new Coromandel Town )

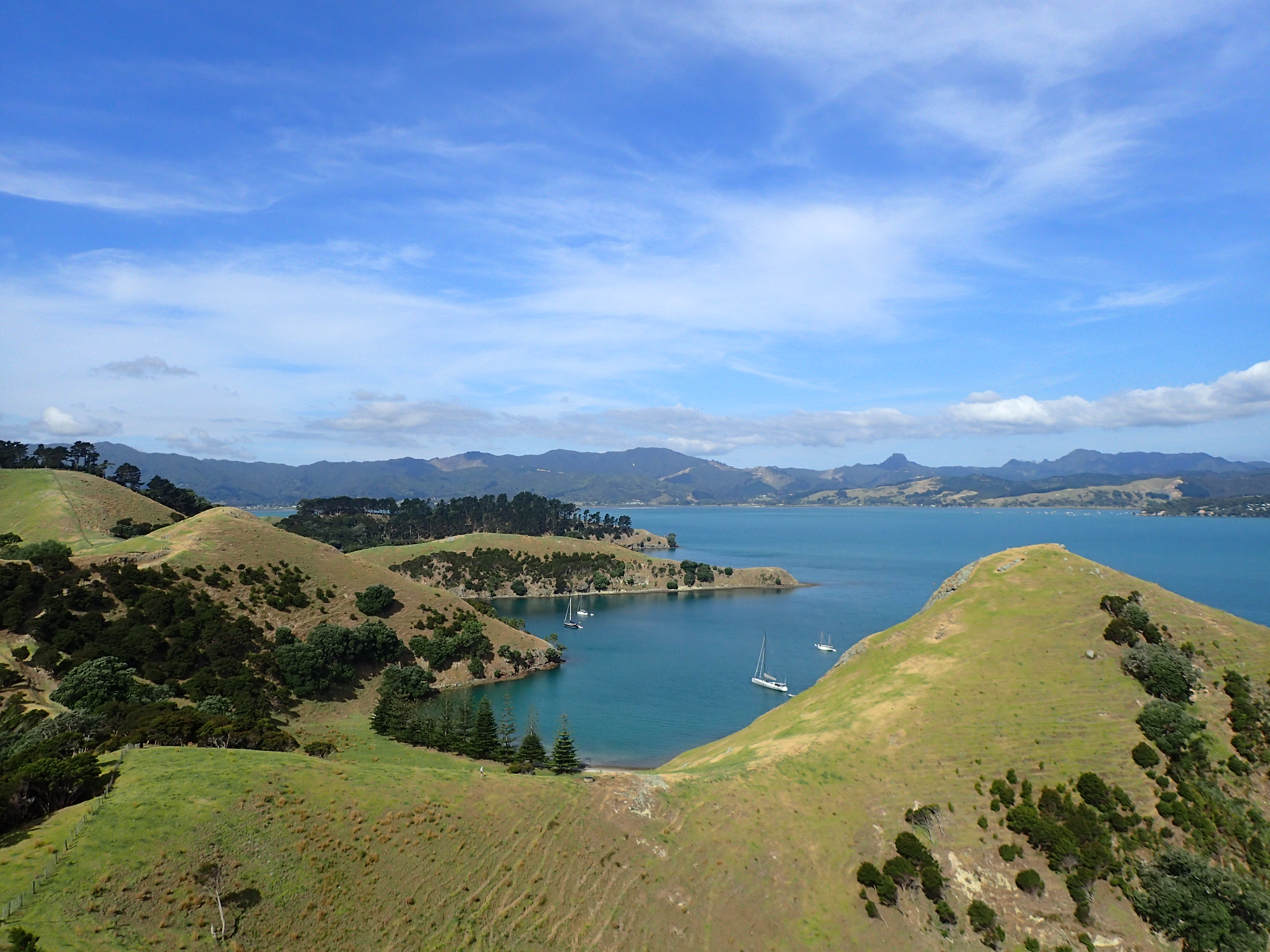
. The land in this photo approximately corresponds to the land in the town plan. Woolshed Bay is the next Bay past the anchored yachts before ridge covered with trees.

Woolshed Bay on the protected southern shore is a popular overnight mooring spot for cruising from Auckland.

== See also ==
- List of islands of New Zealand
