= 1864 in New Zealand =

- Decades: 1840s; 1850s; 1860s; 1870s; 1880s
- See also: History of New Zealand; List of years in New Zealand; Timeline of New Zealand history

The following lists events that happened during 1864 in New Zealand.

== Incumbents ==
=== Regal and viceregal ===
- Head of State — Queen Victoria
- Governor — Sir George Grey

=== Government and law ===
The 3rd Parliament continues.

- Speaker of the House — David Monro
- Premier — Frederick Weld takes over from Frederick Whitaker on 24 November.
- Minister of Finance — William Fitzherbert replaces Reader Wood who resigned on 24 November.
- Chief Justice — Hon Sir George Arney

== Events ==
- 11 February: Major Charles Heaphy is recommended for the Victoria Cross. It was not awarded until 1867.
- 31 March – 2 April: Battle of Ōrākau
- 11 June: The Timaru Herald publishes its first issue. The paper was initially weekly, but increased its frequency of publication to bi-weekly and then tri-weekly, and became a daily on 1 January 1878. It continues today.
- Australian magpie introduced to New Zealand
- Up to 6000 miners come to the Wakamarina Valley in Marlborough after gold is discovered. Canvastown is founded at the river mouth. About 25,000 ounces (710,000 g) of gold is recovered in 1864, but the surface gold is quickly exhausted.
- The Wairau Record starts publishing in Blenheim. The newspaper changed its name to The Marlborough News and General Advertiser in 1865 and then to just The Marlborough News. It folded in 1874.
- The Marlborough Times starts publishing in Blenheim. It folds after about six months.
- West Coast gold rush (1864)

== Arts and literature ==
=== Music ===
- The Dunedin Choral Society is formed.
- The Lyster Opera Company makes its first tour to New Zealand (possibly the first by a full opera company).

== Sport ==
=== Cricket ===
Gearge Parr's All England Eleven plays at a cricket carnival in Dunedin against teams from Otago and Canterbury. They later play at Christchurch's Hagley Park. None of the matches qualified as first-class and the home sides were allowed to field up to 22 batsmen. Itinerary

=== Horse racing ===
==== Major race winner ====
- New Zealand Derby winner: Opera

=== Shooting ===
Ballinger Belt: Lieutenant Morse (Nelson)

== Births ==
- 27 April: David Kennedy, Marist brother, astronomer.

== Deaths ==
=== January–June ===
- 6 January (at Bath, England): Robert Wynyard, colonial administrator (born 1802)
- 17 February (at London, England): William Cautley, early settler and politician (born 1822)
- 2 April: Hine-i-turama Ngatiki, woman of mana (born 1818)
- 28 April: Tohi Te Ururangi, tribal leader and assessor
- 27 May: Marmaduke Nixon, politician and soldier (born 1814)
- 18 June:

- Octavius Mathias, pioneering Anglican priest (born 1805)
- George Rhodes, pastoralist (born 1816)

- 21 June (Battle of Te Ranga):

- Rawiri Puhirake, tribal leader
- Henare Wiremu Taratoa, tribal missionary, teacher and war leader

=== July–December ===
- 8 July: Charles de Thierry, adventurer who attempted to establish his own sovereign state in New Zealand in the years before British annexation (born 1793)
- 13 September: Thomas McDonnell, Snr., Additional British Resident in New Zealand (born 1788)
- 20 September: Aaron Buzacott, missionary on Rarotonga
- 23 September (at South Yarra, Victoria): Robert Clark Morgan, missionary in the South Seas (born 1798)
- 2 November: John McGlashan, lawyer, politician, public servant and educationalist (born 1802)
- 6 December: John Cuff, politician (born 1805)
- 29 December: John Ryan, recipient of the Victoria Cross (born 1839)

=== Unknown date ===
- Hare Pomare, musician

== See also ==
- List of years in New Zealand
- Timeline of New Zealand history
- History of New Zealand
- Military history of New Zealand
- Timeline of the New Zealand environment
- Timeline of New Zealand's links with Antarctica
