= 1873 in New Zealand =

- Decades: 1850s; 1860s; 1870s; 1880s; 1890s
- See also: History of New Zealand; List of years in New Zealand; Timeline of New Zealand history

The following lists events that happened during 1873 in New Zealand.

== Incumbents ==
=== Regal and viceregal ===
- Head of State — Queen Victoria
- Governor — Sir George Ferguson Bowen is transferred, on 19 March, to Australia to become Governor of Victoria. His replacement, The Rt. Hon Sir James Fergusson, takes up his appointment on 14 June.

=== Government and law ===
The 5th New Zealand Parliament continues.

- Speaker of the House — Sir Francis Dillon Bell
- Premier — William Fox, "caretaker" Premier since the sudden resignation of George Waterhouse on 3 March, steps down in favour of Julius Vogel on the latter's return to New Zealand on 8 April.
- Minister of Finance — Julius Vogel
- Chief Justice — Hon Sir George Arney

=== Main centre leaders ===
- Mayor of Auckland — Philip Philips
- Mayor of Christchurch — Henry Sawtell followed by Edward B. Bishop
- Mayor of Dunedin — Henry Fish
- Mayor of Wellington — Joseph Dransfield

== Events ==
- 17 February: The Daily Southern Cross Newspaper prints a hoax report of a Russian invasion of Auckland.
- 3 May: The New Zealand Tablet begins publication in Dunedin. The newspaper was published weekly by the Catholic Church until 1996.
- Late August: A cyclone hits the South Island east coast, wrecking several ships.
- December: The Onehunga Branch railway line from Auckland to Onehunga (via Newmarket, Ellerslie, and Penrose) is opened.

== Sport ==
=== Horse racing ===
==== Major race winners ====
- New Zealand Cup: Kakapo
- New Zealand Derby: Rapapa

=== Rugby union ===
- The Auckland and Thames football clubs adopt rugby union, having previously played association football.
- North Shore rugby club founded.

=== Shooting ===
Ballinger Belt: Lieutenant Hoskins (Thames)

== Births ==
- 17 February: Emily Hancock Siedeberg, New Zealand's first female medical graduate.
- 21 October (in New South Wales): Bob Semple, politician and unionist.
- 9 December (in Ireland): James McCombs, politician
- 18 December (in Tasmania): Edith Joan Lyttleton, writer.

=== Unknown date ===
- Benjamin Sutherland, railway clerk, grocer, businessman and philanthropist
- (in England): Lionel Terry, white supremacist, murderer.

== Deaths ==
- 6 or 7 August: Phillip Tapsell mariner, whaler and trader

== See also ==
- List of years in New Zealand
- Timeline of New Zealand history
- History of New Zealand
- Military history of New Zealand
- Timeline of the New Zealand environment
- Timeline of New Zealand's links with Antarctica
