= 1874 in New Zealand =

- Decades: 1850s; 1860s; 1870s; 1880s; 1890s
- See also: History of New Zealand; List of years in New Zealand; Timeline of New Zealand history

The following lists events that happened during 1874 in New Zealand.

== Incumbents ==
=== Regal and viceregal ===
- Head of State — Queen Victoria
- Governor — The Rt. Hon Sir James Fergusson resigns and is replaced by The Marquess of Normanby

=== Government and law ===
The 5th New Zealand Parliament continues.

- Speaker of the House — Sir Francis Dillon Bell
- Premier — Julius Vogel.
- Minister of Finance — Julius Vogel
- Chief Justice — Hon Sir George Arney

=== Main centre leaders ===
- Mayor of Auckland — Philip Philips followed by Henry Isaacs followed by Frederick Prime
- Mayor of Christchurch — Michael Brennan Hart followed by Fred Hobbs
- Mayor of Dunedin — Henry Fish followed by Andrew Mercer
- Mayor of Wellington — Charles Borlase

== Events ==
- 1 January: Wreck of the Surat, carrying 271 passengers and 37 crew, on the Catlins coast. All survived.
- 5 January: The Poverty Bay Herald begins publishing in Gisborne. It is initially bi-weekly. The paper changed its name to The Gisborne Herald in 1939, and continues to publish as a daily today.
- 15 January: The Nelson Examiner and New Zealand Chronicle, first published in 1842, produces its last issue.
- 30 June: The Wellington Independent publishes its final issue, and is replaced by The New Zealand Times. The newspaper started in 1845.
- 18 November: Fire and sinking of the Cospatrick carrying emigrants to New Zealand near the Cape of Good Hope; one of New Zealand's worst disasters as only three of the 472 on board survived.
- The Marlborough Times begins publication bi-weekly, and absorbs The Marlborough News. It became a daily in 1882. The Marlborough Express bought it in 1895 and closed it in 1905.
- The Marine Department employs Capt. B.A. Edwin to provide weather maps and forecasts to ships, establishing New Zealand's first weather service.

== Sport ==
=== Horse racing ===
- 25 May — Recorded by some sources as the date of first race meeting at Ellerslie.(see also 1857)
- The Auckland Cup is established at Ellerslie Racecourse.
- The Wellington Cup becomes an annual race. The first winner of which evidence survives is recorded.

==== Major race winners ====
- New Zealand Cup: Tambourini
- New Zealand Derby: Tadmor
- Auckland Cup: Templeton
- Wellington Cup: Castaway

=== Rugby union ===
- Rugby union spreads quickly, with many new clubs being formed: Ngāruawāhia, Hamilton, Cambridge, New Plymouth (Taranaki club) Hawera (Egmont club), Parnell, Grafton, Ponsonby, and Mount Hobson. Rugby was also taken up at Auckland College and Auckland Grammar School.

=== Shooting ===
Ballinger Belt: Captain Skinner (Waiuku Rifles)

== Births ==
- 8 February: Edmund Anscombe, architect.
- 20 September: George Smith, athlete and rugby player.

== Deaths ==
- 22 April: Thomas Brunner, surveyor and explorer.

== See also ==
- List of years in New Zealand
- Timeline of New Zealand history
- History of New Zealand
- Military history of New Zealand
- Timeline of the New Zealand environment
- Timeline of New Zealand's links with Antarctica
