= Arthur Thompson =

Arthur Thompson may refer to:

- Arthur Thompson (Australian footballer) (1871–1955), Australian rules footballer
- Arthur Thompson (cricketer) (1914–1987), English cricketer
- Arthur Thompson (English footballer) (1922–1996), English former footballer
- Arthur Thompson (gangster) (1931–1993), Scottish gangster
- Arthur Thompson (jockey) (1916–1988), Irish jockey
- Arthur Thompson (wrestler) (1911–1978), British Olympic wrestler
- Arthur E. Thompson (1891–1969), North Dakota politician
- Arthur Herbert Thompson (1890–1916), English soldier and football player
- Arthur Lisle Thompson (1884–1949), Liberal party member of the Canadian House of Commons
- Arthur R. Thompson (1938-2024), CEO of the John Birch Society

== See also ==
- Arthur Thomson (disambiguation)
- Arthur Tomson (1859–1905), English painter
