= 1871 in New Zealand =

- Decades: 1850s; 1860s; 1870s; 1880s; 1890s
- See also: History of New Zealand; List of years in New Zealand; Timeline of New Zealand history

The following lists events that happened during 1871 in New Zealand.

== Incumbents ==
=== Regal and viceregal ===
- Head of State – Queen Victoria
- Governor – Sir George Ferguson Bowen

=== Government and law ===
The 1871 election takes place between 14 January and 1 February. The 5th New Zealand Parliament commences.

1 February – Māori elections are held for the first time in conjunction with a general election, although the first Māori MPs had been elected in 1868.

- Speaker of the House – After the election Sir Francis Dillon Bell becomes Speaker replacing Sir David Monro who stood down at the end of 1870.
- Premier – William Fox
- Minister of Finance – Julius Vogel
- Chief Justice – Hon Sir George Arney

=== Main centre leaders ===
- Mayor of Auckland – Philip Philips
- Mayor of Christchurch – Andrew Duncan followed by James Jameson
- Mayor of Dunedin – Thomas Birch followed by Henry Fish
- Mayor of Wellington – Joseph Dransfield

== Events ==
- 1 February: The Daily Telegraph begins publishing in Napier. It continues until 1999, when it merges with The Hawke's Bay Herald Tribune to form Hawke's Bay Today.
- 5 July: New Zealand's first university, Otago opens its doors. It was absorbed into the University of New Zealand three years later.
- The Westport News begins publication. The newspaper continues to publish Monday-Friday.

== Sport ==
=== Athletics ===
The first amateur club is formed, in South Canterbury. Professional athletics is already well established.

=== Horse racing ===
==== Major race winners ====
- New Zealand Cup: Peeress
- New Zealand Derby: Defamation

=== Rugby union ===
- 12 May: Founding of the Wellington Rugby club, the second rugby union club in New Zealand.

=== Shooting ===
Ballinger Belt: Captain Wales (Otago)

== Births ==
- 10 January: Hoeroa Tiopira, rugby union player
- 10 March (in Europe): George William von Zedlitz, professor of languages
- 6 June: Freeman Wright Holmes, jockey, horse driver, trainer and breeder

== Deaths ==
=== Date unknown ===
- Helen Ann Wilson, nurse and community leader (b. 1793)

== See also ==
- History of New Zealand
- List of years in New Zealand
- Military history of New Zealand
- Timeline of New Zealand history
- Timeline of New Zealand's links with Antarctica
- Timeline of the New Zealand environment
