= 1870 in New Zealand =

- Decades: 1850s; 1860s; 1870s; 1880s; 1890s
- See also: History of New Zealand; List of years in New Zealand; Timeline of New Zealand history

The following lists events that happened during 1870 in New Zealand.

== Incumbents ==
=== Regal and viceregal ===
- Head of State – Queen Victoria
- Governor – Sir George Ferguson Bowen

=== Government and law ===
The 4th New Zealand Parliament continues.

- Speaker of the House – Sir David Monro stands down at the end of the year. He will be replaced after the 1871 election by Sir Francis Dillon Bell
- Premier – William Fox
- Minister of Finance – Julius Vogel
- Chief Justice – Hon Sir George Arney

Voting in New Zealand elections is changed to a secret ballot.

=== Main centre leaders ===
- Mayor of Christchurch – John Anderson followed by Andrew Duncan
- Mayor of Dunedin – Thomas Birch followed by Henry Fish
- Mayor of Wellington – Joseph Dransfield

== Events ==
- 27 August – 3 September: Second visit by Prince Alfred, returning briefly to Wellington before departing for Sydney.
- Torrens system of registered land titles adopted.

== Sport ==
=== Archery ===
- The first club meets at One Tree Hill, Auckland.

=== Golf ===
- New Zealand's first golf course was opened in Dunedin.

=== Horse racing ===
There are 2 races for both the New Zealand Cup and New Zealand Derby (presumably at the beginning and end of the calendar year).^{(Confirmation required)}

==== Major race winners ====
- New Zealand Cup: Knottingley
- New Zealand Cup: Knottingley
- New Zealand Derby: Malabar
- New Zealand Derby: Envy

=== Rugby union ===
Charles Monro, son of the Speaker of the House, Sir David Monro, introduces rugby to the Nelson Football club.

- 14 May – First rugby club match, Nelson College versus Nelson Football Club "The Town" at the Botanical reserve. This was the first interclub game of rugby union played in New Zealand.
- 12 September – A Nelson team, the "Lunatics", defeats Wellington at Petone.
- – The first "international" between Wellington and a team from HMS Rosario.

=== Shooting ===
Ballinger Belt: Lieutenant Goldie (Otago)

== Births ==
- February (no date): Arthur Withy, journalist and politician.
- 14 April: James Cowan, writer.
- 20 October: C. F. Goldie, painter.

== Deaths ==
- 5 July: Henry Powning Stark, politician and sharebroker.
- 16 July: Betty Guard, of pioneering whaling family.
- 27 November (in England): James Stuart-Wortley, politician
- 30 November: Francis Jollie, politician

== See also ==
- History of New Zealand
- List of years in New Zealand
- Military history of New Zealand
- Timeline of New Zealand history
- Timeline of New Zealand's links with Antarctica
- Timeline of the New Zealand environment
