= 1872 in New Zealand =

- Decades: 1850s; 1860s; 1870s; 1880s; 1890s
- See also: History of New Zealand; List of years in New Zealand; Timeline of New Zealand history

The following lists events that happened during 1872 in New Zealand.

== Incumbents ==
=== Regal and viceregal ===
- Head of State — Queen Victoria
- Governor — Sir George Ferguson Bowen

=== Government and law ===
The 5th New Zealand Parliament continues.

- Speaker of the House — Sir Francis Dillon Bell
- Premier — On 11 October George Waterhouse replaces Edward Stafford after the latter loses a vote of confidence. Stafford had only been in office for 1 month having taken over when William Fox was forced to resign on 10 September.
- Minister of Finance — Julius Vogel loses his position on 10 September when the Fox ministry is forced to resign and is replaced by Thomas Gillies. Vogel regains the post on 11 October after he moves a vote of no confidence in the new ministry.
- Chief Justice — Hon Sir George Arney

=== Main centre leaders ===
- Mayor of Auckland — Philip Philips
- Mayor of Christchurch — James Jameson followed by Henry Sawtell
- Mayor of Dunedin — Henry Fish
- Mayor of Wellington — Joseph Dransfield

== Events ==
- Vaccination of babies against smallpox made compulsory by the Public Health Act 1872
- 2 May: The Waikato Times and Thames Valley Gazette begins publishing in Ngāruawāhia. Initially it was produced three times a week. It moved to Hamilton in 1875 and became the Waikato Times. The paper, a daily since the late 19th century, continues to publish today.
- 4 September: The Bay of Plenty Times publishes its first issue. The Tauranga-based newspaper continues to publish today.
- 5 October: The Poverty Bay Standard begins publishing as a weekly newspaper in the Gisborne area. It increased its frequency over the next two years to become tri-weekly. It was later called the Gisborne Standard.

== Sport ==
=== Athletics ===
The first recorded amateur athletic meeting takes place, in Christchurch.

=== Golf ===
The first golf club in New Zealand is formed in Otago to play on a 9-hole course at Mornington, Dunedin.

=== Horse racing ===
==== Major race winners ====
- New Zealand Cup winner – Detractor
- New Zealand Derby winner – Culumny

=== Lawn bowls ===
The Dunedin Bowling and Quoiting Club opens its own green.

=== Rugby union ===
- 20 July: Wanganui Rugby Club founded.

=== Shooting ===
Ballinger Belt — Captain Wales (Otago)

== Births ==
- 22 February: Frank Worsley, sea captain and explorer.
- 21 June: Winter Hall, silent movie actor.
- 18 November: Frederick Augustus Bennett, first Bishop of Aotearoa.

== Deaths ==
- 27 July: Richard Packer, politician.
- 11 August: Richard Cantrell, politician.

== See also ==
- List of years in New Zealand
- Timeline of New Zealand history
- History of New Zealand
- Military history of New Zealand
- Timeline of the New Zealand environment
- Timeline of New Zealand's links with Antarctica
