= Arthur Thomson =

Arthur Thomson may refer to:

- Arthur Thomson (anatomist) (1858–1935), British academic
- Arthur Thomson (naturalist) (1861–1933), Scots naturalist
- A. A. Thomson (1894–1968), cricketer and author
- Arthur Thomson (physician) (1890–1977), British physician
- Arthur Thomson (fanzines) (1927–1990), fanzine writer and artist, magazine illustrator, known as "ATom"
- Arthur Thomson (footballer, born 1903) (1903–?), English footballer
- Arthur Thomson (footballer, born 1948) (1948–2002), Scottish footballer
- Arthur Landsborough Thomson (1890–1977), Scottish ornithologist
- Arthur Thomson (military surgeon) (1816–1860), New Zealand military surgeon, medical scientist, writer and historian
- Arthur C. Thomson (1871–1946), American prelate

== See also ==
- Arthur Tomson (1859–1905), English painter
- Arthur Thompson (disambiguation)
