= 1869 in New Zealand =

- Decades: 1840s; 1850s; 1860s; 1870s; 1880s
- See also: Other events of 1869; Timeline of New Zealand history

The following lists events that happened during 1869 in New Zealand.

== Incumbents ==
=== Regal and viceregal ===
- Head of State — Queen Victoria
- Governor — Sir George Ferguson Bowen

=== Government and law ===
The 4th Parliament continues.

- Speaker of the House — Sir David Monro
- Premier — Edward Stafford is replaced by William Fox on 28 June after Stafford's government is defeated.
- Minister of Finance — William Fitzherbert is replaced by Julius Vogel after the defeat of the Stafford government.
- Chief Justice — Hon Sir George Arney

=== Main centre leaders ===
- Mayor of Christchurch — William Wilson followed by John Anderson
- Mayor of Dunedin — Thomas Birch

== Events ==
Flag of the United Tribes of New Zealand

The New Zealand Ensign for use on Government ships

- 4–5 January: Te Kooti and his followers manage to escape the siege of Ngā Tapa pā.
- 13 February: A war party of Ngāti Maniapoto led by Wetere Te Rerenga kills all three men, a woman and three children, and also the Wesleyan missionary John Whiteley who arrives shortly afterwards, at the isolated Pukearuhe Redoubt. This is the final act of the Taranaki wars.
- 11 April: Prince Alfred the Duke of Edinburgh visits New Zealand on HMS Galatea.
- 5 June: 1869 Christchurch earthquake
- August: The first bicycle built in Auckland is ridden for the first time. Bicycles are also built and ridden in Christchurch and Dunedin in this year.
- The University of Otago is established, being New Zealand's first University.

=== Undated ===
- The New Zealand Ensign is introduced for use on government ships. It does not become the official national flag until 1902. The flag of the United Tribes of New Zealand is also in common use.
- Resignation and departure from New Zealand of Jean Baptiste Pompallier, First Catholic Bishop in New Zealand.
- Closure of St Mary's Seminary, Auckland.

== Sport ==
=== Horse racing ===
==== Major race winners ====
- New Zealand Cup winner: Mainsail
- New Zealand Derby winner: Manuka

=== Shooting ===
Ballinger Belt: No competition

== Births ==
- 6 February: Patrick O'Regan, lawyer, politician and judge.
- 28 April: Frances Hodgkins, painter.
- 30 April: 'Charles Robert Norris Mackie, pacifist and social reformer
- 18 May: James Parr, politician.

== Deaths ==
- 16 March: Johnny Jones, whaler, early settler.
- 30 March: William Field Porter, politician.
- Āpihai Te Kawau, Māori leader.

== See also ==
- History of New Zealand
- List of years in New Zealand
- Military history of New Zealand
- Timeline of New Zealand history
- Timeline of New Zealand's links with Antarctica
- Timeline of the New Zealand environment
