= Nuka =

Nuka may refer to:

== Places ==
- Nuka Island, an island in Kenai Peninsula Borough, Alaska, United States
- Nuka, Kiribati, a settlement on Beru atoll
- Nuka Formation, a geologic formation in Alaska

== People ==
- Nuka (beat maker) (born 2000/2001), New Caledonian beat maker and music producer
- Anushka Manchanda (born 1984), musical artist known as Kiss Nuka
- Nuka Taipari (died 1863), New Zealand tribal leader, warrior and tohunga

== Fictional characters ==
- Nuka (The Lion King), a character from the 1998 Disney direct-to-video animated film The Lion King II: Simba's Pride
- A character in Astro Boy, see List of Astro Boy (1980 TV series) episodes

== Other ==
- The Japanese word for rice bran (糠; ぬか)

== See also ==
- Nukan (disambiguation)
- Nukaq, meaning "little brother" in many Eskaleut languages
