= 1863 in New Zealand =

- Decades: 1840s; 1850s; 1860s; 1870s; 1880s
- See also: History of New Zealand; List of years in New Zealand; Timeline of New Zealand history

The following lists events that happened during 1863 in New Zealand.

== Incumbents ==
=== Regal and viceregal ===
- Head of State — Queen Victoria
- Governor — Sir George Grey

=== Government and law ===
The 3rd New Zealand Parliament continues.

- Speaker of the House — David Monro
- Premier — Frederick Whitaker replaces Alfred Domett on 30 October after Domett loses a vote of no-confidence.
- Minister of Finance — Reader Wood
- Chief Justice — Hon Sir George Arney

== Events ==
- 1 January: The Colonist ceases publishing and is absorbed into the Daily Telegraph. It began as the Otago Colonist in 1856.
- 7 February: HMS Orpheus is wrecked at the entrance to Manukau Harbour with the loss of 189 lives.
- 23 February: A magnitude 7.5 earthquake strikes Hawke's Bay.
- 1 May: The Evening Star, a Dunedin newspaper, publishes its first issue. The paper continued until 1979.
- July: The beginning of the Invasion of Waikato under Duncan Alexander Cameron.
- July: Heavy snowfalls followed by warm rains cause sudden and extensive flooding in Central Otago, destroying numerous gold mining camps. It is estimated that at least 100 miners died in the floods and the preceding snowstorm.
- November: Shortly after his government loses a vote of no-confidence, former premier Alfred Domett moves a resolution in Parliament that the Capital of New Zealand be moved closer to Cook Strait. This leads to the movement of the Capital to Wellington in 1865.
- 13 November: The New Zealand Herald publishes its first issue. The Auckland-based newspaper continues to publish today.
- Otago gold rush (1861–63)

Undated

- The Government-sponsored Māori language magazine Te Manuhiri Tuarangi and Maori Intelligencer ceases publication. It started in 1861, but predecessors were published from 1842.
- The Government starts printing a Māori language newspaper, Te Pihoihoi Mokemoke, to combat the views expressed by the Māori King Movement's newspaper Te Hokioi o Nui-Tireni e Rere atu ra. After the fifth issue was published, the press was seized by Ngāti Maniapoto in one of several incidents which led to the Invasion of Waikato. Later in the year Te Hokioi o Nui-Tireni e Rere atu ra, which started in 1861, also ceased publication.
- A town board is established in Wellington with three wards (Thorndon, Lambton and Te Aro) but no mayor.

== Arts and literature ==
=== Music ===
- One of the earliest recorded visits by an opera singer to New Zealand is made by Australian Marie Carandini.

== Sport ==
=== Horse racing ===
==== Major race winner ====
- New Zealand Derby winner: Azucena

=== Shooting ===
Ballinger Belt: Lieutenant Owen (Wanganui)

== Births ==
- 27 April (in India): Henry Braddon, rugby union player.
- 8 August: Robert Wright, mayor of Wellington and politician.
- 3 November: Thomas William "Torpedo Billy" Murphy, boxing world title holder.

=== Unknown date ===
- Annette Paul, salvation army officer
- George Pearce (in England), member of parliament

== Deaths ==
- 2 February: Te Matenga Taiaroa, tribal leader
- 10 April: David MacNish, interpreter, labourer, bricklayer, farmer and Pākehā Māori
- 28 May: Richard Davis, missionary, meteorologist
- 8 November: Nuka Taipari, tribal leader, warrior and tohunga

=== Unknown date ===
- Matiu Parakatone Tahu, tribal tohunga and mission teacher (died in late 1863 or early 1864)

== See also ==
- List of years in New Zealand
- Timeline of New Zealand history
- History of New Zealand
- Military history of New Zealand
- Timeline of the New Zealand environment
- Timeline of New Zealand's links with Antarctica
