= 1860 in New Zealand =

- Decades: 1840s; 1850s; 1860s; 1870s; 1880s
- See also: History of New Zealand; List of years in New Zealand; Timeline of New Zealand history

The following lists events that happened during 1860 in New Zealand.

== Incumbents ==
=== Regal and viceregal ===
- Head of State — Queen Victoria
- Governor — Colonel Thomas Gore Browne leaves office on 3 October to take up the post of Governor of Tasmania. His successor is Sir George Grey who takes up the position in December.

=== Government and law ===
The general election of 1860–1861 begins on 12 December but does not conclude until 28 March the following year. The 2nd Parliament continues until the completion of the election.

- Speaker of the House — The sitting Speaker, Sir Charles Clifford, does not stand for re-election. He will be replaced in 1861 by Sir David Monro.
- Premier — Edward Stafford.
- Minister of Finance — William Richmond.
- Chief Justice — Hon George Arney

== Events ==
- 2 January: The Auckland Independent ceases publishing. It began in 1859.
- 6 January: The Marlborough Press publishes its first issue. The paper continues until 1948.
- 8 January: Julius von Haast begins his journey of exploration of the West Coast.
- 17 March: The assault on Te Kohia pā marks the beginning of the First Taranaki War.
- 28 March: Battle of Waireka.
- 27 June: The battle of Puketakauere is a major setback for Imperial forces.
- 28 December: Imperial forces capture Matarikoriko Pā, near Waitara.

Undated

- The Nelson Advertiser is a short-lived newspaper in the Nelson, New Zealand area.

== Arts and literature ==
=== Music ===
- A choral society is formed in Wellington.
- The Canterbury Vocal Union is formed by nine men in Christchurch. It shortly afterwards merges with the St. Cecilia Society and will eventually become the Royal Christchurch Music Society.

== Sport ==
=== Cricket ===
The first inter-provincial cricket game is played between Auckland and Wellington. Auckland win.

=== Horse racing ===
The New Zealand Derby is held for the first time, at Riccarton Racecourse. This is the first race in New Zealand to have a continuous annual history.

==== Major race winner ====
- New Zealand Derby – Ada

=== Lawn bowls ===
Bowls is first known to have been played in the country, in Auckland.

=== Shooting ===
The Government recommends that prizes be given for rifle shooting. This leads to the first National Rifle Shooting Championships in 1861.

== Births ==
- 11 September: James Allan, rugby union player

== Deaths ==
- 8 January: Louis Catherin Servant, Catholic priest and missionary
- 30 May: Karetai, tribal leader
- 25 June: Pōtatau Te Wherowhero, first Māori King
- 6 August: William Cargill, British soldier, Otago founder and politician
- 7 August: Charles Southwell, English-born journalist, freethinker and newspaper publisher
- 4 November (in Tianjin, China): Arthur Saunders Thomson, military surgeon, medical scientist, writer and historian
- 26 December: Barnet Burns, English sailor and trader

=== Unknown date ===
- Te Rei Hanataua, tribal leader

== See also ==
- List of years in New Zealand
- Timeline of New Zealand history
- History of New Zealand
- Military history of New Zealand
- Timeline of the New Zealand environment
- Timeline of New Zealand's links with Antarctica
