= 1861 in New Zealand =

- Decades: 1840s; 1850s; 1860s; 1870s; 1880s
- See also: History of New Zealand; List of years in New Zealand; Timeline of New Zealand history

The following lists events that happened during 1861 in New Zealand.

A ceasefire is reached in the First Taranaki War, with British efforts to defeat Māori disaffected over land purchases having largely failed.

Prosperity comes to the south with the onset of the Otago gold rush. Within a year the population of the Tuapeka goldfields is twice that of Dunedin.

== Incumbents ==
=== Regal and viceregal ===
- Head of State — Queen Victoria
- Governor — Colonel Thomas Gore Browne leaves office on 3 October to take up the post of Governor of Tasmania. His successor is Sir George Grey who takes up the position in December.

=== Government and law ===
The general election of 1860–61 concludes on 28 March having begun on 12 December the previous year. The 3rd Parliament commences.

- Speaker of the House — David Monro becomes Speaker after the retirement of Sir Charles Clifford the previous year.
- Premier — William Fox replaces Edward Stafford on 12 July after Stafford loses a vote of no-confidence.
- Minister of Finance — William Richmond loses the post on 12 July with the fall of the Fox government, and is replaced by Reader Wood.
- Chief Justice — Hon George Arney

== Events ==
- 16 February: The Southern News and Foveaux Strait's Herald publishes its first issue. The paper will become daily by 1875 and change its name to The Southland Daily News. It continues until 1968.
- 28 February: The Government-sponsored Māori language magazine, The Maori Messenger or Te Karere Maori publishes its final issue and is replaced by Te Manuhiri Tuarangi and Maori Intelligencer, which continues until 1863.
- 21 March: The Auckland Examiner, which started in 1856, ceases publication.
- 25 May: The Press publishes its first issue. It begins as a weekly newspaper, will move to bi-weekly in 1862, and becomes daily in 1863. It continues today.
- 29 June: Confirmation of the richness of Gabriel Read's gold discovery at Gabriel's Gully on the Tuapeka River is published in Dunedin and the Otago gold rush is on.
- 15 November: The Otago Daily Times produces its first issue. The newspaper continues today.
- Otago gold rush (1861–63)

Undated

- The Māori King Movement begins publication of Te Hokioi o Nui-Tireni e Rere atu ra, which continues until 1863.

== Sport ==
=== Shooting ===
The first National Rifle Shooting Championships is held. This is the oldest national championships in New Zealand in any sport. The Championships are held in conjunction with various district contests until the first centralised Championships at Trentham in 1902.

The winner receives the Championship Belt (and Pouch). In 1907 the belt is won outright by A. Ballinger and it is renamed the Ballinger Belt. This name has been applied retroactively to the Championship since its inception.

Ballinger Belt: Lieutenant Brighton (Auckland)

== Births ==
- 21 February (in Italy): – G. P. Nerli, painter
- 12 June: James Gardiner, Australian politician.

=== Unknown date ===
- William Stewart, politician.

== Deaths ==
- 8 February: William Cutfield King, member of the New Zealand House of Representatives
- 26 March: Andrew Sinclair, British surgeon notable for his botanical collections
- 13 June: Te Herekiekie, tribal leader
- 18 July (in London): Joseph Greenwood, soldier and member of the New Zealand House of Representatives
- 16 September: Jeanie Collier, runholder
- 17 November (in London): John Robert Godley, founder of Canterbury
- 22 November (in Grafton, New South Wales): William Edward Vincent, printer and publisher

=== Unknown date ===
- Te Huruhuru, tribal leader

== See also ==
- List of years in New Zealand
- Timeline of New Zealand history
- History of New Zealand
- Military history of New Zealand
- Timeline of the New Zealand environment
- Timeline of New Zealand's links with Antarctica
