= 1875 in New Zealand =

- Decades: 1850s; 1860s; 1870s; 1880s; 1890s
- See also: History of New Zealand; List of years in New Zealand; Timeline of New Zealand history

The following lists events that happened during 1875 in New Zealand.

== Incumbents ==
=== Regal and viceregal ===
- Head of State — Queen Victoria
- Governor — The Marquess of Normanby

=== Government and law ===
The 1875 general election begins on 29 December but does not finish until 4 January the following year. The election marks the end of the 5th New Zealand Parliament.

- Speaker of the House — The sitting Speaker, Sir Francis Dillon Bell, does not stand in the 1875 election at the end of the year. He will be replaced by Sir William Fitzherbet in 1876.
- Premier — Daniel Pollen becomes Premier on 6 July replacing Julius Vogel.
- Minister of Finance — Harry Atkinson takes over from Julius Vogel on 6 July.
- Chief Justice — Hon Sir George Arney retires and is replaced on 1 April by Hon Sir James Prendergast

=== Main centre leaders ===
- Mayor of Auckland — Frederick Prime followed by Benjamin Tonks
- Mayor of Christchurch — Fred Hobbs
- Mayor of Dunedin — Andrew Mercer followed by Keith Ramsay
- Mayor of Wellington — William Sefton Moorhouse

== Events ==
- Contract let for construction of the Rimutaka Incline railway using the Fell system.

== Sport ==
=== Athletics ===
The first club in the country, the Wellington Amateur Athletic Club, holds its first meeting.

=== Cricket ===
The Wellington Cricket Association is formed.

=== Horse racing ===
- New Zealand Cup winner: Nectar
- New Zealand Derby winner: Daniel O’Rourke
- Auckland Cup winner: Kingfisher
- Wellington Cup winner: Tambourini

see also Category:Horse races in New Zealand.

=== Rugby union ===
- Rugby union begins in Timaru, Temuka, Blenheim, Picton, Greymouth (with the formation of new clubs) and Napier where the club formed in 1874 adopted rugby rules.
- A combined Auckland clubs team toured Wellington, Christchurch, Dunedin, Nelson and New Plymouth. They lost all matches, despite some of their opposition having only learned rugby rules for a few weeks in preparation for the tour – the Christchurch and Dunedin clubs had primarily been playing football (soccer).

=== Shooting ===
Ballinger Belt: Lieutenant Skinner (Auckland)

== Births ==
- 19 January: Ethel Benjamin, first female lawyer in NZ.
- 23 March: Alexander Young, politician.
- 6 June: William Polson, politician.
- 16 June: Richard Lawson, teacher, university professor and educationalist.
- 25 July: Elsie Dohrmann, scholar, teacher and temperance campaigner
- 7 November: Frank Milner, headmaster and educationalist.

=== Unknown date ===
- John Robertson, politician.

== Deaths ==
- 15 March: William Turnbull Swan, politician (born 1828)
- 29 May: James Mackay, politician (born 1804).
- 31 July: Thomas Beckham, politician (born 1810)
- 8 August: William Tolmie, politician (born 1833).
- 12 August: John Parkin Taylor, politician (born 1812).
- 17 October: Archibald Clark, politician (born 1805).
- 23 December: Felix Wakefield, colonist (born 1807)

== See also ==
- List of years in New Zealand
- Timeline of New Zealand history
- History of New Zealand
- Military history of New Zealand
- Timeline of the New Zealand environment
- Timeline of New Zealand's links with Antarctica
