= 1865 in New Zealand =

- Decades: 1840s; 1850s; 1860s; 1870s; 1880s
- See also: Other events of 1865; Timeline of New Zealand history

The following lists events that happened during 1865 in New Zealand.

== Incumbents ==
=== Regal and viceregal ===
- Head of State — Queen Victoria
- Governor — Sir George Grey

=== Government and law ===
The 3rd Parliament continues.

- Speaker of the House — David Monro
- Premier — Edward Stafford becomes Premier on 16 October when Frederick Weld retires due to ill-health and stress.
- Minister of Finance — Edward Stafford takes up the post on 31 October after William Fitzherbert loses the post when the Weld government ends on 16 October.
- Chief Justice — Hon Sir George Arney

=== Main centre leaders ===
- Mayor of Dunedin — William Mason

== Events ==
- The New Zealand Exhibition in Dunedin runs from 12 January until 6 May 1865.
- The Capital of New Zealand is moved from Auckland to Wellington.
- The Marlborough Times ceases publication. It was founded in 1864.
- February – The start of the West Coast gold rush with rumours of gold being found.
- 18 February: The Press in Christchurch starts publishing a magazine, The Weekly Press. The magazine ran until 1928.
- May – The West Coast Times is founded. It began as a weekly newspaper and became a daily in January 1866. It ceased publishing in 1917.
- 26 July: Parliament officially sits in Wellington for the first time, in the former Provincial Council chambers. (see also 1862)
- 30 August: The New Zealand Spectator and Cook's Strait Guardian publishes its last issue. It began in 1844.
- November: The Grey River Argus begins publication in Greymouth. It published three times a week until becoming daily in 1871. The paper folded in 1966.

== Sport ==
=== Horse racing ===
The race which becomes the New Zealand Cup in 1883, is run for the first time at Riccarton Racecourse.

==== Major race winners ====
- New Zealand Cup: Rob Roy
- New Zealand Derby: Egremont

=== Rowing ===
The Star Boating Club is formed in Wellington. (other sources state 1867)

=== Shooting ===
Ballinger Belt: No competition

== Births ==
- 13 May: Lindsay Buick, historian, journalist and politician (d. 1938)
- 10 July: James Randall Corrigan, member of NZ Parliament

== Deaths ==
=== January–June ===
- 28 January: John Perry Robinson, Superintendent of Nelson Province
- 25 February: Hoani Wiremu Hīpango, tribal leader, teacher and assessor
- 12 April: Thomas Halbert, whaler, trader and founding father
- 30 April (at Upper Norwood, England): Robert FitzRoy, second Governor of New Zealand (born 1805)
- 5 May (at sea off Blackwall, London): Samuel Brees, artist, surveyor and engineer
- 11 May: Thomas Antill, Australian cricketer and New Zealand bank manager (born 1830)
- 8 June: John Morgan, missionary (born 1806)

=== July–December ===
- 14 July: Nathaniel Burslem, recipient of the Victoria Cross (born 1837)
- 21 July: Frederick Merriman, politician (born 1818)
- 22 July: James Francis Fulloon, interpreter and public servant (born 1840)
- 9 November: George Kissling, Archdeacon of Waitemata (born 1805)

== See also ==
- List of years in New Zealand
- Timeline of New Zealand history
- History of New Zealand
- Military history of New Zealand
- Timeline of the New Zealand environment
- Timeline of New Zealand's links with Antarctica
