= 1857 in New Zealand =

- Decades: 1830s; 1840s; 1850s; 1860s; 1870s
- See also: History of New Zealand; List of years in New Zealand; Timeline of New Zealand history

The following lists events that happened during 1857 in New Zealand.

== Population ==
The estimated population of New Zealand at the end of 1857 is 57,150 Māori and 49,802 non-Māori.

== Incumbents ==
=== Regal and viceregal ===
- Head of State – Queen Victoria
- Governor – Colonel Thomas Gore Browne

=== Government and law ===
The 2nd Parliament continues.

- Speaker of the House – Sir Charles Clifford
- Premier – Edward Stafford.
- Minister of Finance – William Richmond
- Chief Justice – William Martin resigns on 12 June. Hon George Arney is appointed on 2 September but does not arrive until the next year.

== Events ==
- 7 February: The Auckland Register begins publishing. It ends in 1862.
- 14 May: The Taranaki News publishes its first issue. It becomes the Taranaki Daily News in 1885, and continues to publish today.
- 24 September: The Hawke's Bay Herald and Ahuriri Advocate publishes its first issue. It becomes the Hawke's Bay Herald in 1858. The paper publishes weekly at first, becomes bi-weekly in 1861, and then daily in 1871. In 1937 it will merge with another paper to form the Hawke's Bay Herald-Tribune.
- 23 October: The Colonist publishes its first issue, in Nelson. The newspaper is published until 1920, when it is incorporated into The Nelson Evening Mail.

== Sport ==
=== Horse racing ===
Two existing clubs combine to form the Auckland Racing Club. The ARC holds its first meeting at Ellerslie Racecourse. (see also 1874)

== Births ==
- 20 August: James Carroll, politician.
- 10 September: William Barber, Mayor of Wellington and politician.

== Deaths ==
- 16 July: Gilbert Mair, sailor and merchant trader

=== Unknown date ===
- Makea Te Vaerua Ariki, sovereign of the Cook Islands
- John Guard, one of the first European settlers in the South Island

== See also ==
- List of years in New Zealand
- Timeline of New Zealand history
- History of New Zealand
- Military history of New Zealand
- Timeline of the New Zealand environment
- Timeline of New Zealand's links with Antarctica
