= Anne Chapman (disambiguation) =

Anne Chapman (c. 1922–2010) was a Franco-American ethnologist.

Ann, Anne or Anna Chapman or similar may also refer to:

- Anna Chapman (born 1982), Russian agent arrested in the US in 2010
- Anne Maria Chapman (1791–1855), New Zealand missionary
- Annie Chapman (1840–1888), British victim of Jack the Ripper
- Ann Chapman (1937–2009), New Zealand limnologist and the first woman to lead a scientific expedition to Antarctica
