= Helen Wilson =

Helen Wilson may refer to:

- Helen Wilson Public School, an elementary school located in Brampton, Ontario, Canada
- Helen Wilson (murder victim), a victim of the spree killer Howard Unruh
- Helen Wilson (writer) (1869–1957), New Zealand teacher, farmer, community leader and writer
- Helen Wilson (mathematician) (born 1973), British mathematician
- Helen Wilson (Australian judge)
- Helen Wilson Nies (1925–1996), chief judge of the United States Court of Appeals for the Federal Circuit from 1990 to 1994
- Helen Ann Wilson (1793–1871), New Zealand nurse and community leader
- Helen Mary Wilson (physician) (1864–1951), physician and social purity campaigner
- Helen Van Pelt Wilson (1901–2003), American garden writer
- Beatrice Six
- Penny Way (born 1962), officially named Helen Wilson, British windsurfer
