= 1866 in New Zealand =

- Decades: 1840s; 1850s; 1860s; 1870s; 1880s
- See also: Other events of 1866; Timeline of New Zealand history

The following lists events that happened during 1866 in New Zealand.

== Incumbents ==
=== Regal and viceregal ===
- Head of State — Queen Victoria
- Governor — Sir George Grey

=== Government and law ===
The 1866 election is held between 12 February and 6 April. After the election the 4th Parliament commences.

- Speaker of the House — David Monro is knighted during the year and becomes Sir David Monro.
- Premier — Edward Stafford
- Minister of Finance — William Fitzherbert replaces Francis Jollie on 24 August. Jollie had only replaced Edward Stafford on 12 June.
- Chief Justice — Hon Sir George Arney

=== Main centre leaders ===
- Mayor of Dunedin — William Mason

== Events ==
- The Canterbury Standard ceases publication. The Christchurch newspaper started in 1854.
- 5 March: The Nelson Evening Mail publishes its first issue. The Mail was the first daily newspaper published in Nelson. It changed its name to The Nelson Mail in 1993, and continues to publish today.
- 18 March: The Greymouth Evening Star publishes its first issue. The newspaper changed its name to The Greymouth Star in 2006 continues to publish today.
- 21 April: The Marlborough Express publishes its first issue. It became daily in 1880, which continued until 2017 when falling revenue reduced publication to three times a week. Parent company Stuff stopped physical publication in 2025, but the paper continues to publish digitally today.
- May: The New Zealander stops publishing after its office burns down. The Auckland-based newspaper started publishing in 1845.
- 26 August: The Cook Strait telegraph cable between Whites Bay, Marlborough and Lyall Bay, Wellington is inaugurated for inter-island telegrams.
- 22 September: The Ross Guardian starts publication. The newspaper continued until 1879.
- 12 October: The Battle of Omaranui takes place near Napier.

== Sport ==
=== Horse racing ===
- New Zealand Cup winner: Naurmahal
- New Zealand Derby winner: Nebula

=== Rowing ===
- The Union Rowing Club of Christchurch is formed.
- Star Boating Club is established, and remains the oldest sporting club in Wellington as of as of 2026.

=== Shooting ===
Ballinger Belt: Sergeant Christie (Otago)

== Births ==
- 1 April: William Blomfield, cartoonist (d. 1938)
- 1 July: John Lillicrap, 29th Mayor of Invercargill.
- 14 September: – William Montgomery Jr., politician

== Deaths ==
- 20 August: Richard Barton, first European resident of Trentham, Upper Hutt (born 1790)
- 14 November (in England): Charles Torlesse, prominent surveyor for the Canterbury Association (born 1825)
- 9 December: Henry Monson, gaoler (born 1793)

== See also ==
- List of years in New Zealand
- Timeline of New Zealand history
- History of New Zealand
- Military history of New Zealand
- Timeline of the New Zealand environment
- Timeline of New Zealand's links with Antarctica
