= 1855 in New Zealand =

- Decades: 1830s; 1840s; 1850s; 1860s; 1870s
- See also: History of New Zealand; List of years in New Zealand; Timeline of New Zealand history

The following lists events that happened during 1855 in New Zealand.

== Population ==
The estimated population of New Zealand at the end of 1855 is 59,500 Māori and 37,192 non-Māori.

== Incumbents ==
=== Regal and viceregal ===
- Head of State – Queen Victoria
- Governor – Colonel Thomas Gore Browne, appointed in 1854, arrives to take up his position on 6 September.

=== Government and law ===
The 1st Parliament is dissolved on 15 September in preparation for the 1855 general election. The election starts on 26 October and concludes on 28 December. The 2nd Parliament is not formed until 15 April 1856.

There is neither an official Prime minister/Premier/Colonial Secretary or Finance Minister/Colonial Secretary in the government at this point in time. (see 1st New Zealand Parliament)

- Speaker of the House — Sir Charles Clifford
- Chief Justice — William Martin

== Events ==
- January: The Māori language magazine, The Maori Messenger or Te Karere Maori resumes publication with a change to the Māori title. It stopped publication the previous year. Under this name, it continues until 1861.
- 23 January: The 1855 Wairarapa earthquake causes extensive damage but few deaths. The quake, estimated at magnitude 8.2, raises parts of the Wellington harbour foreshore by as much as 6 metres. It is the strongest known New Zealand earthquake since European settlement.
- April: James McKenzie is found guilty of stealing 1000 sheep and sentenced to five years hard labour in Lyttelton. He is pardoned the following year.
- July: New Zealand's first postage stamps are issued.

== Sport ==
=== Horse racing ===
The Canterbury Jockey Club holds its first meeting, at Riccarton Racecourse, including the Canterbury Cup (which is run in heats).

== Births ==
- 23 April: Walter Carncross, politician.

== Deaths ==
- 26 June: Samuel Stephens, member of the New Zealand House of Representatives
- 21 August: William Hulme, British army officer
- 17 September: Alfred Christopher Picard, member of the New Zealand House of Representatives
- 24 September: Ruawahine Irihapeti Faulkner, tribal leader and landowner
- 18 November: Te Rangihaeata, tribal leader
- 6 December: William Swainson, ornithologist, malacologist, conchologist, entomologist and artist
- 12 December: Anne Maria Chapman, missionary

== See also ==
- History of New Zealand
- List of years in New Zealand
- Military history of New Zealand
- Timeline of New Zealand history
- Timeline of New Zealand's links with Antarctica
- Timeline of the New Zealand environment
