= 1876 in New Zealand =

- Decades: 1850s; 1860s; 1870s; 1880s; 1890s
- See also: History of New Zealand; List of years in New Zealand; Timeline of New Zealand history

The following lists events that happened during 1876 in New Zealand.

== Incumbents ==
=== Regal and viceregal ===
- Head of State – Queen Victoria
- Governor – The Marquess of Normanby

=== Government and law ===
The 1875 general election, which started on 29 December, concludes on 4 January. The 6th New Zealand Parliament commences.

Premier Atkinson abolishes the New Zealand provincial system on 1 November.

- Speaker of the House – Sir William Fitzherbet replaces Sir Francis Dillon Bell who did not stand for election at the end of 1875
- Premier – Daniel Pollen resigns on 15 February. Julius Vogel takes over until retiring on 1 September and is in turn replaced by Harry Atkinson.
- Minister of Finance – Julius Vogel takes over as Treasurer (Minister of Finance) from Harry Atkinson when he becomes Premier on 15 February. When Vogel retires on 1 September Atkinson resumes the position.
- Chief Justice – Hon Sir James Prendergast

=== Main centre leaders ===
- Mayor of Auckland City – Benjamin Tonks followed by William Hurst
- Mayor of Christchurch – Fred Hobbs
- Mayor of Dunedin – Keith Ramsay followed by Henry John Walter
- Mayor of Wellington – William Hutchison

== Events ==
- 18 February: The first trans-Tasman submarine communications cable is completed, allowing telegraph communications with the rest of the world.
- 4 April: Speight's is first brewed in Dunedin.
- 30 December: The Daily Southern Cross publishes its last issue, and merges with The New Zealand Herald. The Auckland-based newspaper began publishing as The Southern Cross in 1843.

== Sport ==
=== Cricket ===
The Otago Cricket Association is formed.

=== Horse racing ===
==== Major race winners ====
- New Zealand Cup – Guy Fawkes
- New Zealand Derby – Songster
- Auckland Cup – Ariel
- Wellington Cup – Korari

=== Lawn bowls ===
The first interclub competition in the country is held between the Dunedin and Fernhill clubs.

=== Rugby union ===
- Rugby clubs were founded in Marton, Bulls, and Sanson, Oamaru, Hawera, Pātea, Invercargill, Otautau, Riverton, Greytown, Masterton, Rangiora, Waimate, Kaiapoi and Te Awamutu.
- A combined side from Canterbury toured Nelson, Wellington (at Lower Hutt), and Auckland (at Ellerslie)

=== Shooting ===
Ballinger Belt – Private J. Willocks (Clutha)

== Births ==
- 21 January: Tom Cross, rugby union and rugby league player.
- 24 February: Ernie Booth, rugby union player.
- 23 March: Sally Low, social reformer and peace campaigner.
- 6 April: Harold Williams, linguist.
- 11 April Michael Reardon, political activist
- 7 June: Albert Samuel, politician

== Deaths ==
- 26 August: Henry Balneavis, soldier
- 22 November: Charles Flinders Hursthouse, author and settler.

== See also ==
- List of years in New Zealand
- Timeline of New Zealand history
- History of New Zealand
- Military history of New Zealand
- Timeline of the New Zealand environment
- Timeline of New Zealand's links with Antarctica
