= 1868 in New Zealand =

- Decades: 1840s; 1850s; 1860s; 1870s; 1880s
- See also: Other events of 1868; Timeline of New Zealand history

The following lists events that happened during 1868 in New Zealand.

== Incumbents ==
=== Regal and viceregal ===
- Head of State — Queen Victoria
- Governor — Sir George Grey is recalled by the British government and is replaced on 5 February by Sir George Ferguson Bowen.

=== Government and law ===
The 4th Parliament continues. The first four Māori MPs are elected in 1868.

- Speaker of the House — Sir David Monro
- Premier — Edward Stafford
- Minister of Finance — William Fitzherbert
- Chief Justice — Hon Sir George Arney

=== Main centre leaders ===
- Mayor of Christchurch — William Wilson
- Mayor of Dunedin — John Hyde Harris followed by Thomas Birch

== Events ==
- 1–6 February: The Great storm of 1868 sweeps across the country causing major damage and loss of life. There were several fatalities in Temuka.
- 1 June: The New Zealand Advertiser, which had been absorbed into the New Zealand Times in 1867, is revived. It ceases publication for good in December.
- 13 August: A tsunami caused by the 1868 Arica earthquake in South America causes the only fatalities recorded from tsunamis in New Zealand, with about twenty people swept away in the Chatham Islands.
- 24 August: Wanganui Horticultural Society established.
- Nelson Football Club founded.
- 2 November: New Zealand Mean Time adopted throughout the colony; New Zealand may be the first country to have adopted a standard time throughout the country.
- Coromandel Gold Rush (1867–68)

== Sport ==
=== Cricket ===
The Basin Reserve is first used for cricket.

=== Horse racing ===
==== Major race winners ====
- New Zealand Cup: Flying Jib
- New Zealand Derby: Flying Jib

=== Shooting ===
Ballinger Belt: Sergeant Taylor (Otago)

== Births ==
- 23 February Sir Andrew Hamilton Russell, soldier.
- 19 March: Alfred Ransom, politician and cabinet minister.

=== Full date unknown ===
- Asajiro Noda, seaman, cashier, gum-digger and farmer (d. 1942)

== Deaths ==
- 9 October: George Macfarlan, politician

== See also ==
- History of New Zealand
- List of years in New Zealand
- Military history of New Zealand
- Timeline of New Zealand history
- Timeline of New Zealand's links with Antarctica
- Timeline of the New Zealand environment
