= 1859 in New Zealand =

- Decades: 1830s; 1840s; 1850s; 1860s; 1870s
- See also: History of New Zealand; List of years in New Zealand; Timeline of New Zealand history

The following lists events that happened during 1859 in New Zealand.

== Incumbents ==
=== Regal and viceregal ===
- Head of State — Queen Victoria
- Governor — Colonel Thomas Gore Browne

=== Government and law ===
The 2nd Parliament continues.

- Speaker of the House — Sir Charles Clifford
- Premier — Edward Stafford.
- Minister of Finance — William Richmond is briefly replaced by Henry Sewell between 25 February and 26 April.
- Chief Justice — Hon George Arney

== Events ==
- 10 January – Pencarrow Head Lighthouse becomes the first permanent lighthouse in New Zealand. Its first keeper is Mary Bennett, the only woman to hold the position.
- 13 April – The New Zealand Advertiser starts publishing in Wellington. In 1867 it is incorporated into the New Zealand Times, but it is restored for six months in 1868.
- 3 October – The Auckland Independent begins publishing. It barely survives into the following year.
- 7 November – 18 December – four supplementary elections are held in new general electorates, increasing the number of members of parliament from 37 to 41.

=== Undated ===
The first wharf is built at Onehunga.

== Births ==
- 1 January (in England): John Dumbell, rugby union player.
- 18 November (in Scotland): James Nairn, painter

=== Unknown date ===
- Thomas Field, politician.
- Charles E. Major, politician.

== Deaths ==
- 7 April – John Gray, soldier, politician (born 1801)
- 20 April – James Kelly, Australian explorer who was involved in a feud on Otago Peninsula (born 1791)
- 30 April – Henry Despard, soldier (born c.1784)
- 20 July – Alexander Shepherd, public servant and second Colonial Treasurer (born c.1797)

== See also ==
- List of years in New Zealand
- Timeline of New Zealand history
- History of New Zealand
- Military history of New Zealand
- Timeline of the New Zealand environment
- Timeline of New Zealand's links with Antarctica
