= 1867 in New Zealand =

- Decades: 1840s; 1850s; 1860s; 1870s; 1880s
- See also: Other events of 1867; Timeline of New Zealand history

The following lists events that happened during 1867 in New Zealand.

== Incumbents ==
=== Regal and viceregal ===
- Head of State — Queen Victoria
- Governor — Sir George Grey

=== Government and law ===
The 4th Parliament continues.

- Speaker of the House — Sir David Monro
- Premier — Edward Stafford
- Minister of Finance — William Fitzherbert
- Chief Justice — Hon Sir George Arney

The number of seats in the House of Representatives is increased to 74 with the creation of four Māori seats, and male Māori are given the right to vote. The Legislative Council now has 36 seats.

=== Main centre leaders ===
- Mayor of Dunedin — William Mason followed by John Hyde Harris

== Events ==
- 5 February: Opening of New Zealand's third railway line: 27 km connecting Invercargill and Bluff.
- 20 May: Alexandra is proclaimed a borough.
- 3 June: The Evening Herald is founded in Wanganui. Around the turn of the 20th century, it changed its name to The Wanganui Herald, and continued to publish until 1986.
- 11 September: The New Zealand Advertiser, first published in 1859, produces a final issue and is absorbed into the New Zealand Times. It is revived for six months in 1868.

=== Undated ===
- Arrowtown is proclaimed a borough.
- Coromandel Gold Rush (1867–68)
- Major Charles Heaphy is awarded the Victoria Cross. He is the first soldier from any colony to be so decorated.
- While Henry Jenner is fundraising in England for his new diocese there are increasing concerns over his appointment among the New Zealand clergy and the citizens of Dunedin.

== Sport ==
=== Horse racing ===
A Wellington Cup is held in Wellington. This is no relation to the annual race held from 1874. Racing had only recently been moved from the beaches to Hutt Park in Lower Hutt and Burnham Water in Miramar.

==== Major race winners ====
- New Zealand Cup winner: Magenta
- New Zealand Derby winner: Scandal

=== Rowing ===
The Star Boating Club is formed in Wellington.(other sources state 1867)

=== Shooting ===
Ballinger Belt: Sergeant Chisholm (Otago)

== Births ==
- 30 April: Douglas Lysnar, politician.
- 19 May: Frank Moore, political activist.
- (unknown date) John Charles Thomson, politician.

== Deaths ==
- 16 July: Henry Williams, missionary.

== See also ==
- List of years in New Zealand
- Timeline of New Zealand history
- History of New Zealand
- Military history of New Zealand
- Timeline of the New Zealand environment
- Timeline of New Zealand's links with Antarctica
