= 1858 in New Zealand =

- Decades: 1830s; 1840s; 1850s; 1860s; 1870s
- See also: History of New Zealand; List of years in New Zealand; Timeline of New Zealand history

The following lists events that happened during 1858 in New Zealand.

== Incumbents ==
=== Regal and viceregal ===
- Head of State — Queen Victoria
- Governor — Colonel Thomas Gore Browne

=== Government and law ===
The 2nd Parliament continues.

- Speaker of the House — Sir Charles Clifford
- Premier — Edward Stafford.
- Minister of Finance — William Richmond
- Chief Justice — Hon George Arney who had been appointed on 2 September 1857 arrives early in the year.

== Events ==
- Provincial Council Chambers are constructed in Wellington. These will eventually become the seat of Parliament.
- 19 August – the Electoral Districts Act 1858 is enacted, increasing the number of members of parliament from 37 to 41, with the supplementary elections held in late 1859.

== Births ==
- 1 April: Frederic Truby King, health reformer, founder of Plunket Society.
- 10 June: William Millton, rugby union player
- 16 July (in England): John Luke, Mayor of Wellington and politician.
- 17 October: John Jenkinson, politician.
- 1 November (in Australia): John Rigg, politician.

== Deaths ==
- 8 January: Daniel Wakefield, coloniser and judge.

== See also ==
- List of years in New Zealand
- Timeline of New Zealand history
- History of New Zealand
- Military history of New Zealand
- Timeline of the New Zealand environment
- Timeline of New Zealand's links with Antarctica
