= 1861 Napier by-election =

New Zealand by-election

The 1861 Napier by-election was a by-election held in the Napier electorate during the 3rd New Zealand Parliament, on 1 July 1861.

The by-election was caused by the resignation of incumbent MP Henry Stark and was won by William Colenso. Messrs Colenso, Sealy, Tucker and Ferguson were nominated, with Colenso subsequently elected with a majority of 17.

== Results ==
1861 Napier by-election
Party	Candidate	Votes	%	±%
Independent	William Colenso	47	44.8	
Independent	Henry Sealy	30	28.6	
Independent	John Tucker	23	21.9	
Independent	J. B. Ferguson	5	4.8	
Majority		17	16.2	
Turnout		105		
