= 1862 in New Zealand =

- Decades: 1840s; 1850s; 1860s; 1870s; 1880s
- See also: History of New Zealand; List of years in New Zealand; Timeline of New Zealand history

The following lists events that happened during 1862 in New Zealand.

== Incumbents ==
=== Regal and viceregal ===
- Head of State – Queen Victoria
- Governor – Sir George Grey

=== Government and law ===
The 3rd Parliament continues.

- Speaker of the House – David Monro
- Premier – Alfred Domett replaces William Fox on 6 August after Fox loses a vote of no-confidence.
- Minister of Finance – Reader Wood loses the post on 6 August with the fall of the Fox government, and is replaced by Dillon Bell, but is reappointed just 15 days later on 21 August.
- Chief Justice – Hon Sir George Arney (he is knighted during the year)

== Events ==
- 27 January – The Auckland Register, which started in 1857, ceases publication.
- 1 July – The first telegraph transmission in New Zealand is made from Lyttelton Post Office to Christchurch.
- 7 July – Parliament meets in Wellington for the first time. (see also 1863; 1865)
- 15 August – Horatio Hartley and Christopher Reilly arrive in Dunedin with 87 pounds of gold from the banks of the Clutha river in Cromwell George leading to the Dunstan Gold Rush.
- 12 November – The Invercargill Times publishes its first issue. It changed its name to The Southland Times two years later, and became a daily in 1875. It continues to publish today.
- Otago gold rush (1861–63)

=== Undated ===
- The Nelson Intelligence is a short-lived newspaper in the Nelson, New Zealand area.

== Sport ==
=== Cricket ===
The second inter-provincial game is played. Nelson defeat Wellington.

=== Horse racing ===
==== Major race winner ====
- New Zealand Derby – Emmeline

=== Lawn bowls ===
The Auckland club is now playing on its own green.

=== Rowing ===
1 January – The first recorded rowing regatta takes place on Lyttelton Harbour.

Later in the year the Canterbury Rowing Club is formed to row on the Avon River in Christchurch.

=== Shooting ===
Ballinger Belt – Private Holt (Nelson)

== Births ==
- 15 June: George Helmore, rugby union player
- 21 October: John Findlay, politician

=== Unknown date ===
- Albert Pitt, politician
- (in Australia) Charles Kendall Wilson, politician.

== Deaths ==
- 16 May: Edward Gibbon Wakefield, a driving force behind New Zealand's colonisation
- 5 June: Charles Kettle, surveyor of Dunedin
- October: Iwikau Te Heuheu Tukino III, tribal leader

== See also ==
- List of years in New Zealand
- Timeline of New Zealand history
- History of New Zealand
- Military history of New Zealand
- Timeline of the New Zealand environment
- Timeline of New Zealand's links with Antarctica
