= 1856 in New Zealand =

- Decades: 1830s; 1840s; 1850s; 1860s; 1870s
- See also: History of New Zealand; List of years in New Zealand; Timeline of New Zealand history

The following lists events that happened during 1856 in New Zealand.

After several previous attempts, New Zealand finally achieves "Responsible Government", with a majority of the members of the House of Representatives supporting the Government.

== Population ==
The estimated population of New Zealand at the end of 1856 is 58,300 Māori and 45,540 non-Māori. The total population reaches the 100,000 mark during the year.

== Incumbents ==
=== Regal and viceregal ===
- Head of State – Queen Victoria
- Governor – Colonel Thomas Gore Browne

=== Government and law ===
The 2nd Parliament is formed on 15 April. The election of its members had in fact concluded on 28 December the previous year.

- Speaker of the House – Sir Charles Clifford
- Colonial Secretary – Henry Sewell becomes New Zealand's first Colonial Secretary on 7 May. The Sewell Ministry is defeated on 20 May and he is replaced by William Fox. The Fox Ministry is in turn defeated on 2 June and Fox is replaced by Edward Stafford's Stafford Ministry.
- Colonial Treasurer – Dillon Bell becomes the first Colonial Treasurer on 7 May. When the Sewell government is defeated on 20 May he is replaced by Charles Brown. When the Fox government is defeated on 2 June Brown is replaced by William Richmond
- Chief Justice – William Martin

== Events ==
- 31 July – By Royal Charter, Christchurch is proclaimed New Zealand's first city.
- 18 September – The Wanganui Chronicle publishes its first issue. The paper starts as a fortnightly publication, moves to tri-weekly in 1867, and then to daily in 1871. It continues today.
- 11 December – The Auckland Examiner begins publishing. It continues until 1861.
- 26 December – The Otago Colonist publishes its first issue. The newspaper changes its name to The Colonist in 1862 and is absorbed into the Daily Telegraph at the beginning of 1863.

== Arts and literature ==
=== Music ===
- A choral society performance of Handel's Messiah is given in Auckland. This the first known performance by such a musical ensemble in New Zealand.
- A Harmonic Society is formed in Dunedin in this year (or possibly earlier).

== Births ==
- 28 July: Arthur Remington, politician.
- 10 October: Florence Young, missionary.
- 27 December: Arthur Brown, Mayor of Wellington.

== Deaths ==
- 13 April: Nōpera Panakareao, tribal leader, evangelist and assessor

=== Unknown date ===
- Te Kani-a-Takirau, Māori chief who refused to sign the Treaty of Waitangi

== See also ==
- List of years in New Zealand
- Timeline of New Zealand history
- History of New Zealand
- Military history of New Zealand
- Timeline of the New Zealand environment
- Timeline of New Zealand's links with Antarctica
