= Nowkan =

Nowkan or Naukan or Nukan or Nookan (Persian: نوكن) may refer to:

- Nowkan, Bushehr
- Nowkan, Kerman
- Nukan, Kermanshah
- Nowkan, West Azerbaijan
