= Henare Wiremu Taratoa =

Ngai Te Rangi missionary and leader (1830–1864)

Henare Wiremu Taratoa (c. 1830 – 21 June 1864) was a notable New Zealand tribal missionary, teacher and war leader.

Of Māori descent, he identified with the Ngāi Te Rangi iwi. He was killed in the Battle of Te Ranga.
