= Anne Chapman (missionary) =

English Anglican missionary (1791–1855)

Anne Maria Chapman (nee Maynard, 13 January 1791 – 12 December 1855) was an English Anglican missionary in New Zealand. Chapman and her husband gave hospitality to early European explorers passing through on the route between Tauranga and the centre of the North Island. The most notable explorers and botanists who were assisted were John Carne Bidwell, Ernst Dieffenbach, and William Colenso. Chapman may have collected seaweeds specimens recorded in J. D. Hooker's Flora Novae-Zelandiae.

== Life ==
Anne Maria Chapman was at Henley-on-Thames, Oxfordshire, England on 13 January 1791. Her father Thomas Maynard was a butcher. She married Thomas Chapman on 14 December 1822 in Henley-on Thames. Chapman and her husband emigrated to New Zealand, arriving at Paihia on 1 August 1830 on the ship Active. They were Christian Missionary Society lay missionaries, and Thomas was assigned to found mission stations at Rotorua and Maketū.

Chapman and her husband gave hospitality to early European explorers passing through on the route between Tauranga and the centre of the North Island. The most notable explorers and botanists who were assisted were John Carne Bidwell, Ernst Dieffenbach, and William Colenso. Anne generally stayed at the mission while her husband travelled, but she was probably the first European woman to see the Pink and White Terraces at Rotomahana.

In the second volume of J.D. Hooker's Flora Novae-Zelandiae (Flowerless Plants, 1855) there are records of the following seaweeds from "Maketu, Chapman": Ectocarpus, Polysiphonia, Champia, Nitophyllum, Plocamium, Gigartina, Ceramium, and Callithamnion. Anne Chapman may have played a part in collecting these.

Chapman died at Maketū on 12 December 1855. Her husband outlived her, and married again, to Mary Jane Moxon. Thomas died in 1876 on Mokoia Island.

== Eponymy ==
- 1855 Gigartina chapmanii. J.D. Hooker & W.H. Harvey in Harvey, W.H. Algae, Flora Novae-Zelandiae 2: 251. Maketu. Chapman.
