= Henry Isaacs =

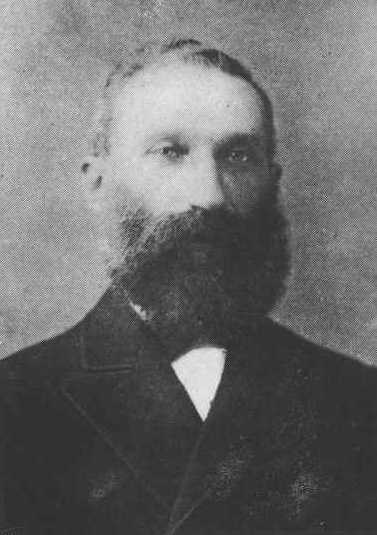
Henry Isaacs, 1874

Henry Isaacs (1831 – 2 August 1909), London-born, was a prominent general merchant in Auckland, New Zealand, from 1850 to 1875, principally through the firm known as E. and H. Isaacs. His elder brother Edward (1820–1891), who established the firm's Melbourne base in 1842, moved to Auckland in 1865 and they ran a troop provisioning business from central Auckland during the invasion of the Waikato. By centuries old tradition this, as with other army contracts, could on occasion be a lucrative business.

== Leading businessmen ==
The brothers participated in the establishment of major Auckland financial institutions and served the community in various ways, Henry as an Auckland City councillor and representative of the council on the Auckland Harbour Board. Henry was also a member of the Auckland province's Board of Health

Among other important enterprises the brothers were promoters of Auckland Shipping Company, which became a part of New Zealand Shipping Company in which Edward represented the brothers' interests.

== Auckland City council ==
Philip Philips, councillor and first mayor of Auckland City, resigned his offices in July 1874 and accepted the position of Auckland's Town Clerk. Isaacs, because he was the most senior member of the Auckland City council, was elected to fill the temporary vacancy of mayor of Auckland City on 20 July 1874, becoming not only the second mayor, but also the second Jewish mayor of Auckland. At the end of 1874 he declined to stand for re-election as mayor because he would shortly retire and return to London. Councillor Frederick Lambert Prime (1825–1916) elected on 16 December 1874 replaced him. Isaacs died in London.

Political offices
Preceded by Philip Philips	Mayor of Auckland City; 1874	Succeeded by Frederick Prime
