= Richard Lawson (professor) =

New Zealand teacher, university professor and educationalist

Richard Lawson (16 June 1875 – 29 October 1971) was a New Zealand teacher, university professor and educationalist. He was born in Warrnambool, Victoria, Australia on 16 June 1875.
