= William Colenso =

New Zealand politician, missionary, botanist, printer and explorer

William Colenso FRS
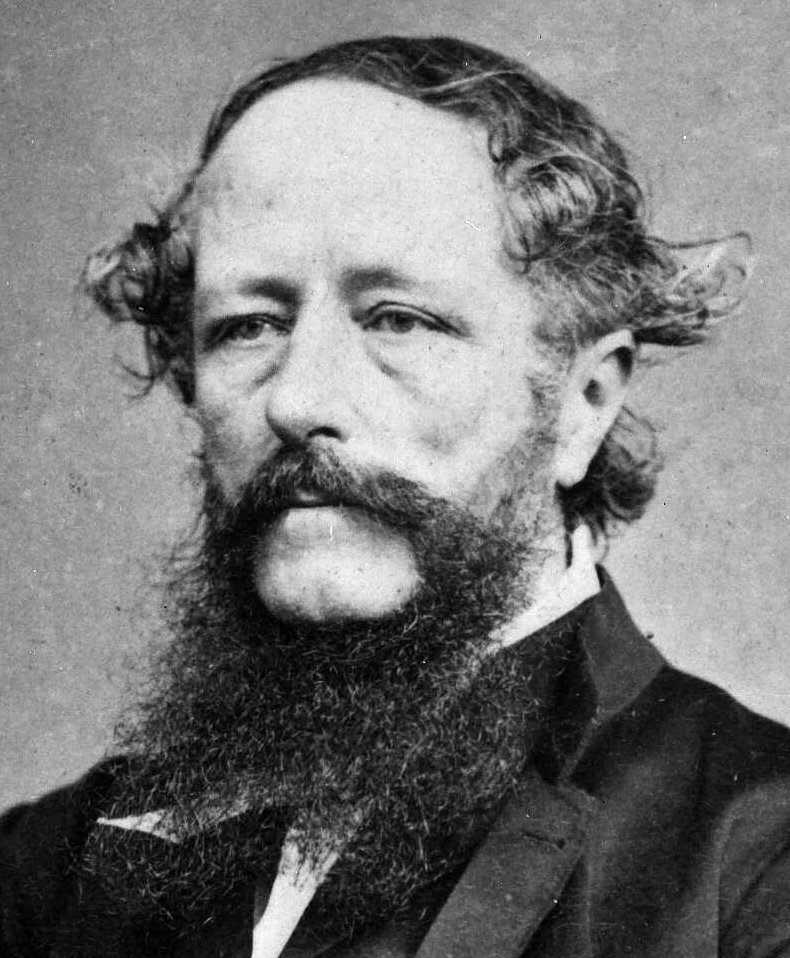
- Colenso in 1868
- Born: 17 November 1811; Penzance, Cornwall, England
- Died: 10 February 1899 (aged 87); Napier, New Zealand
- Occupation: Missionary
- Spouse: Elizabeth Fairburn (m. 1843)

William Colenso FRS (17 November 1811 – 10 February 1899) was a Cornish Christian missionary to New Zealand, and also a printer, botanist, explorer and politician. He attended the signing of the Treaty of Waitangi in 1840 and later wrote an account of the events at the signing.

== Life ==
Born in Penzance, Cornwall, probably on 17 November 1811, he was the cousin of John William Colenso, bishop of Natal. His surname is locative and it originates from the place name Colenso in the parish of St Hilary, near Penzance in west Cornwall. He trained as a printer, starting an apprenticeship in 1826. In 1833 he worked for a London firm who were printers for the Church Missionary Society. The society wanted someone to run a printing press at Paihia in the Bay of Islands, New Zealand, and Colenso got the job.

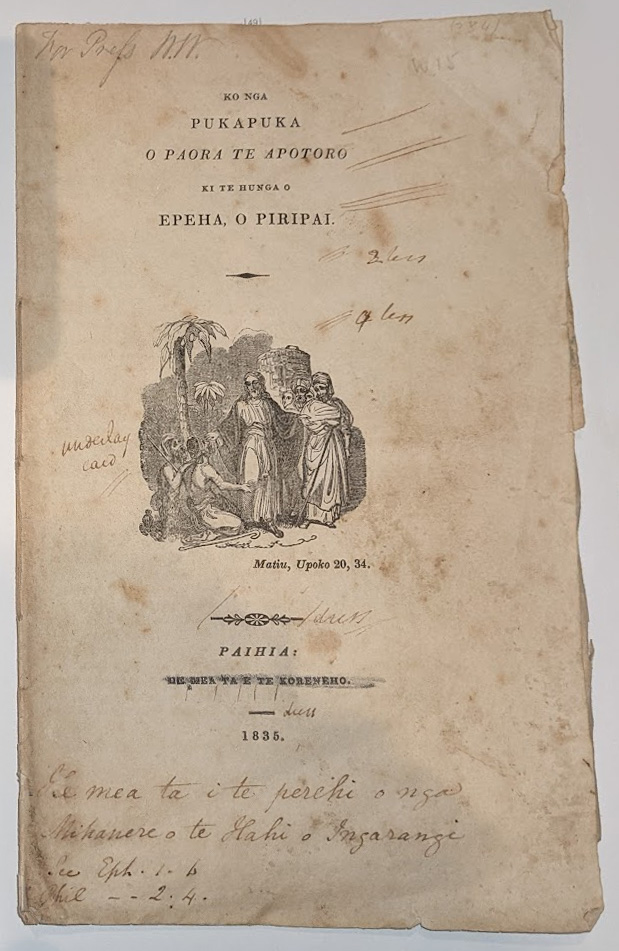
Proof copy of the Epistles to the Ephesians and Philippians, printed in Paihia 17 February 1835, with the corrections of translator William Williams

He sailed for New Zealand via Sydney in June 1834 and arrived at Paihia on 30 December 1834. His first production was a Māori-language version of the Epistles to the Ephesians and Philippians, printed on 17 February 1835. By July 1837, he had printed and bound 2,000 copies of the Epistles to the Ephesians and Philippians, as well as printing addition, multiplication, and shillings-and-pence tables for the schools. By 5 January 1836, he had composed and printed 1,000 copies of St Luke's Gospel, as well as further material for the schools.

He was responsible for the printing of the Māori-language translation of the New Testament in 1837. It was the first book printed in New Zealand and the first indigenous language translation of the Bible published in the southern hemisphere. In 1840, he had printed 10,000 Catechisms, 11,000 Psalms, other religious texts and material for the schools; as well as 200 copies of the New Zealand Gazette for the colonial government.

On 5 February 1840, Colenso recorded and interpreted Māori chiefs (rangatira) debating the Treaty of Waitangi (Te Tiriti o Waitangi) at Waitangi. Before the first signings of the treaty the next day, Colenso interpreted some of the Māori speakers for William Hobson, warning him that Māori he had spoken to did not understand the Treaty, and asking for the orally agreed Article Four of the Treaty to be added in writing.

Colenso travelled around Northland, and then made an overland trek from Hicks Bay to Poverty Bay with William Williams in 1838. Then from December 1841 to February 1842, he travelled from Hicks Bay to Williams's new mission station in Poverty Bay, and on through Waikaremoana, the Urewera, Rotorua, the Waikato, the Manukau and Kaipara harbours and back to the Bay of Islands.

He wanted to move on from his work as a printer and to pursue evangelism in remoter areas. Bishop George Selwyn set up St John's College at Te Waimate mission and accepted Colenso as a candidate for ordination. Colenso married Elizabeth Fairburn on 27 April 1843. From October 1843 to February 1844, Colenso and Williams sailed to the Wairarapa, then walked north to the Ahuriri area (present day Napier). They selected a site on the Waitangi Stream between Awatoto and present day Clive for a Hawke's Bay mission site. Following his theological studies, Colenso was ordained a deacon on 22 September 1844.

He was an avid botanist, detailing and transmitting to Kew Gardens in England previously unrecorded New Zealand flora. He assisted Joseph Dalton Hooker when he visited the Bay of Islands from 18 August to 23 November 1841. In 1866, he was the first New Zealander to be elected as a Fellow of the Royal Society. He wrote several books, and contributed over a hundred papers to scientific journals.

William and Elizabeth Colenso travelled to Hawke's Bay in December 1844 and established a mission station at the Waitangi Stream site. From there Colenso made several long exploratory journeys in the 1840s through the central North Island in the company of Māori guides with the aim of reaching the Māori settlements of Inland Pātea, in the Taihape region, and converting them to Christianity. His travels took him through trackless forest, over the high Ruahine Range and across the Rangipo Desert and past the mountains of Ruapehu and Tongariro to the shores of Lake Taupō. His use of existing Māori routes into the interior contributed greatly to the European exploration of the central North Island.

From 1845, Colenso undertook lengthy journeys every spring and autumn. In 1847, he travelled to Taupō then south to pass by the Tongariro and Ruapehu mountains. He visited regularly the Wairapara and Hutt districts, where he was frequently at odds with the European lessees of sheep and cattle stations such as Kelly, McMaster, Grindell and Gillies. In 1845, about a dozen sheep and cattle farmers had leased large areas of land from local Māori by mutual agreement. Māori owners regularly raised the annual lease fee to the annoyance of the farmers. The farmers regularly pressed Māori to sell land. Many younger chiefs were keen sellers but were thwarted by conservative older chiefs. The farmers also paid Māori to assist in building roads to help economic development. Colenso regularly counselled Māori against selling any land or helping build roads, which he claimed would be disastrous for them. Colenso was especially vociferous about the farmers living with Māori women as their wives, without a Christian marriage. Colenso also had strong views about drinking and horse racing, which were a regular part of colonial life that Māori as well as settlers enjoyed. This put him in opposition to a wide range of New Zealanders. In 1847, Judge Chapman, Doctor Featherston, the bank manager McDonald and the merchant Waitt visited the Hutt valley. There was criticism of what was called "the malicious interference of Colenso".

His standing in New Zealand colonial society and the Church Missionary Society, along with his fervent hope of ordination, was lost when it was discovered that he was the father of a son (Wiremu) by Ripeka, the Māori maid of his wife, Elizabeth Colenso, in May 1850. In November 1851, Colenso was suspended as a deacon and dismissed from the mission in 1852. Te Roore Neho claims to be descended from Colenso and "a high-ranking Māori woman", Tihi Awarua of the Ngāti Mahia hapū (subtribe) of Ngāpuhi, through a son born in 1841, and that there are now more than 2000 descendants, Neho being short for Koreneho, the transliteration of Colenso into Māori. It might, however, be merely a baptismal name. Diaries from the mid-period of Colenso's life were destroyed in circumstances suggesting they told of other indiscretions. In 1853, he was convicted of a technical assault over an argument about Ripeka and their son.

New Zealand Parliament
Years	Term	Electorate	Party
1861–1866	3rd	Napier	Independent

Following a long wilderness period during which he continued his botany work, he took an active role as a local politician in Napier. He represented Napier as the Member of Parliament for the Napier electorate from the 1861 by-election to 1866, when he retired.

In 1871, Colenso was the speaker at the Hawkes Bay Provincial Council when Ngāti Kahungunu had been persuaded by farmers, the Russell Brothers, that they could get their land back in what came to be known as the Repudiation Movement. Their chief Henare Matua had already pronounced all land dealing with both the Crown and private sales illegal. The brothers persuaded Māori that legal action against large land owners such as Donald McLean would succeed. Colenso advised Māori not to take a legal path that would leave them deep in debt. Lawyer and later Government Native Minister John Sheehan, who spoke fluent Māori, acted on behalf of the Repudiation Movement. Matua attempted to stand as an MP but lost and the movement, deep in debt, petered out.

In 1890 he published a first-person account of the signing of the Treaty, at which he had taken extensive notes.

He died in Napier in 1899, leaving two sons and a daughter. His son from Ripeka, Wiremu/William, left New Zealand for Cornwall, married a cousin and lived in Penzance until his death. His son from Elizabeth Fairburn, Ridley Latimer, attended St John's College, Cambridge, and finally settled in Scotland. His daughter Frances Mary married William Henry Simcox and settled in Ōtaki, New Zealand. He left Francis £2000 in cash, Latimer most of his estate and £200 in cash; Latimer sold quickly or destroyed most of his collections. Neither of his sons had surviving children – Frances had nine.

== Awards ==
William Colenso's book, Ko te Kawenata Hou o to Tatou Ariki te Kai Wakaora a Ihu Karaiti: He mea, published in 1837, was listed in Books of Mana as one of the 180 most significant works of Māori-authored non-fiction.

== Legacy ==
Many species have been named in honour of Colenso including Acrothamnus colensoi.

William Colenso College, in the suburb of Onekawa, Napier, is named in his honour.

== Colenso Society ==
Founded in 2010 by academics and historians across New Zealand, the Colenso Society aims to "promote the study of the life and work of the Reverend William Colenso FLS FRS".

== Published work ==
- Colenso, William (1890). The Authentic and Genuine History of the Signing of the Treaty of Waitangi. Wellington: By Authority of George Didsbury, Government Printer.
- "Historical incidents and traditions of the olden times". Transactions of the Royal Society of New Zealand. 1880.
- "A list of fungi recently discovered in New Zealand". Transactions of the Royal Society of New Zealand. 1884.
- "A description of a new species of Coccinella". Transactions of the Royal Society of New Zealand. 1887.

== Gallery ==
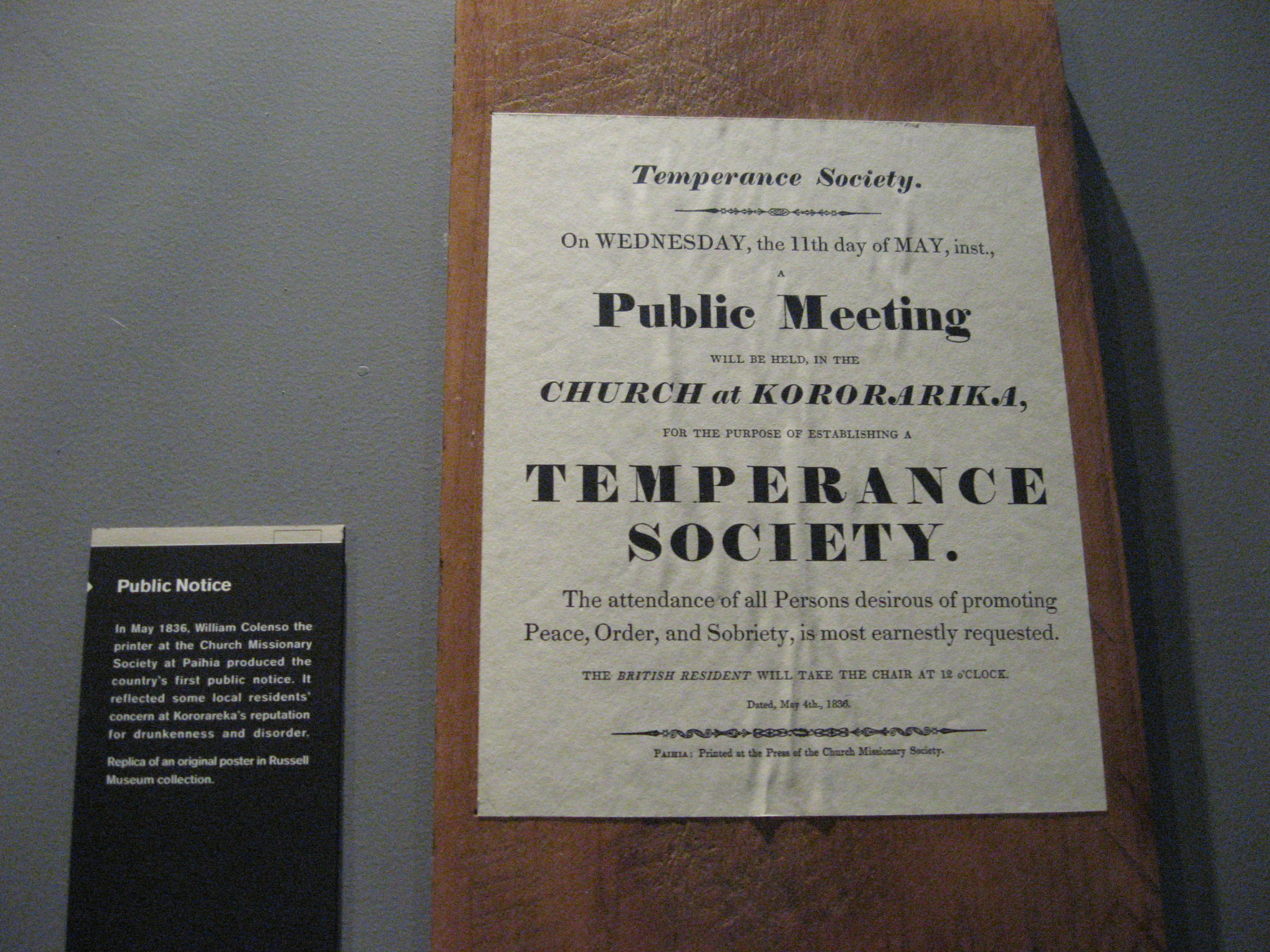
The first public notice in New Zealand, printed by Colenso's press

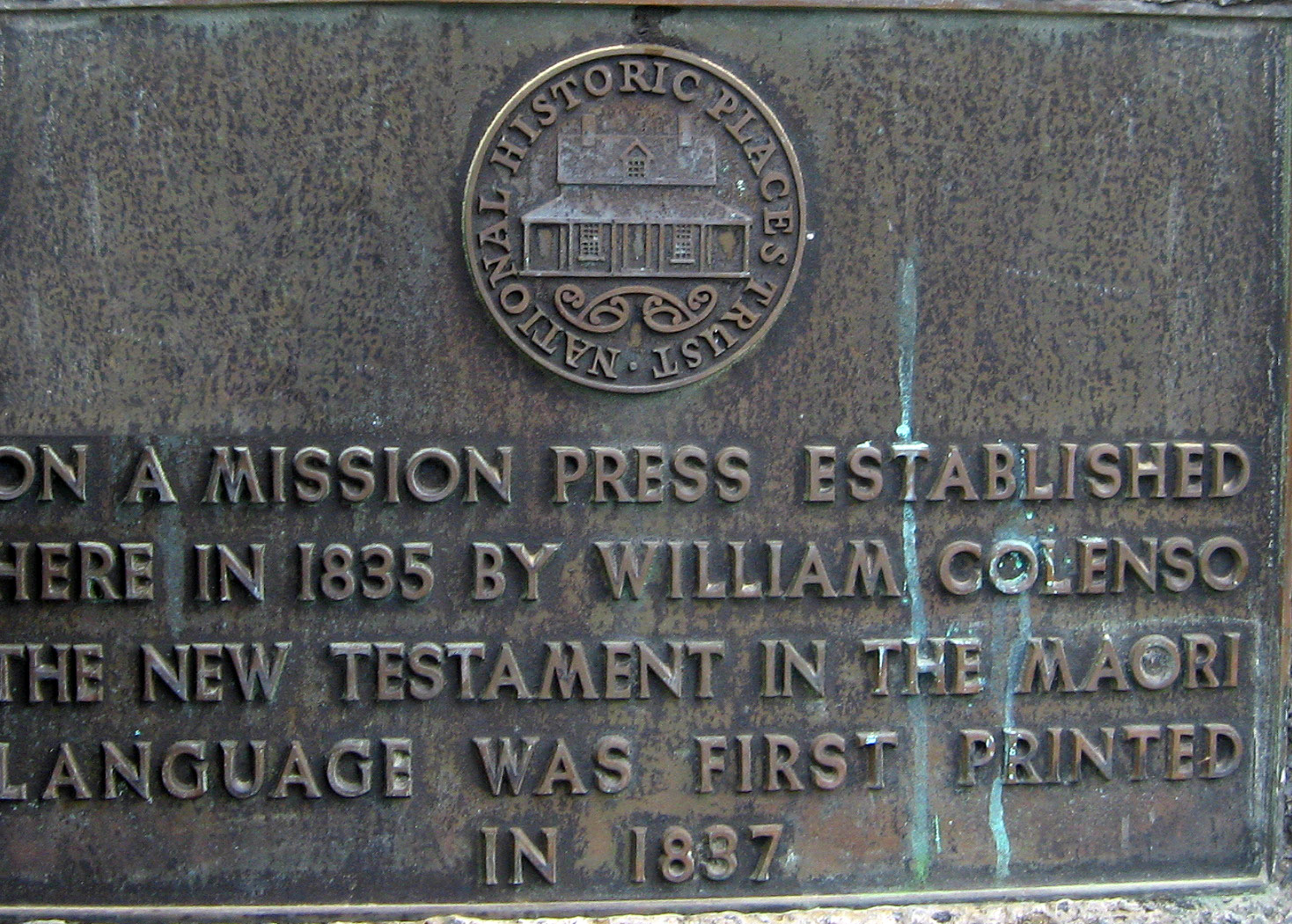
A plaque in Paihia commemorating Colenso

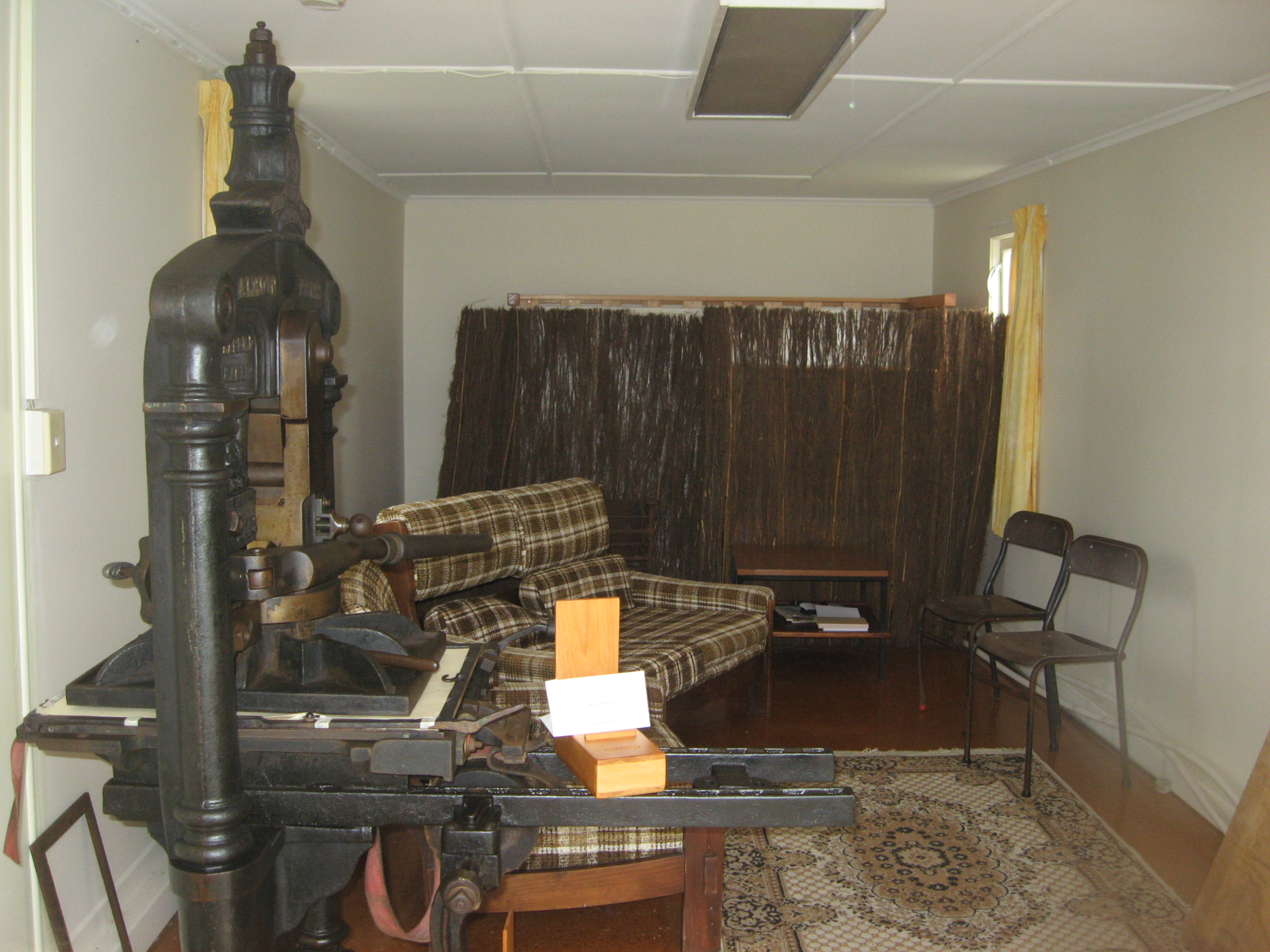
A press at Haven of History, a reconstruction of the Church Missionary Society mission station in Paihia, with a press in the style of Colenso's

== See also ==
- Church Missionary Society in New Zealand

== Notes and references ==
- Bagnall, A.G.; Petersen, G.C. (1948). William Colenso, Printer, Missionary, Botanist, Explorer, Politician: His Life and Journeys. Wellington, NZ: A.H. & A.W. Reed.
- McIntyre, Roberta (2002). The Canoes of Kupe: A History of Martinborough District. Victoria University Press. ISBN 978-0-86473-446-4.
- Newman, Keith (2010). Bible & Treaty: Missionaries among the Māori – A New Perspective. North Shore, NZ: Penguin. ISBN 978-0-14-320408-4. OCLC 655641724.
- Rowse, A. L. (1989). The Controversial Colensos. Redruth, Cornwall: Dyllansow Truran. ISBN 978-1-85022-047-3. About Bishop Colenso of Natal and his cousin William Colenso
- Temple, Philip (1985). New Zealand Explorers: Great Journeys of Discovery. Christchurch, NZ: Whitcoulls Publishers. ISBN 978-0-7233-0743-3.
- Wells, Peter (2011). The Hungry Heart: Journeys with William Colenso. Vintage. ISBN 978-1-86979-474-3.

New Zealand Parliament
Preceded by Henry Powning Stark	Member of Parliament for Napier; 1861–1866	Succeeded by Donald McLean
