= Jeanie Collier =

Scottish born New Zealand runholder (1791–1861)

Jeanie Collier (c.1791 – 16 September 1861) was a New Zealand runholder. She was born in Monimail, Fife, Scotland.

In 1854, she became the first woman in the history of New Zealand to be given her own land, something normally allotted to only male colonists. She had emigrated in the company of three underage nephews and her mentally challenged brother.
