= Arthur Thompson (cricketer) =

English cricketer

Personal information
- Full name: Arthur Paul Thompson
- Born: 1 March 1914; Leicester, Leicestershire, England
- Died: May 1987 (aged 73); Leicester, Leicestershire, England
- Batting: Left-handed
- Bowling: Right-arm medium

Domestic team information
- Years: Team
- 1937: Leicestershire

Career statistics
Competition	First-class
Matches	2
Runs scored	11
Batting average	3.66
100s/50s	–/–
Top score	5
Balls bowled	–
Wickets	–
Bowling average	–
5 wickets in innings	–
10 wickets in match	–
Best bowling	–
Catches/stumpings	–/–
- Source: Cricinfo, 8 February 2013

Arthur Paul Thompson (1 March 1914 – May 1987) was an English cricketer. Thompson was a left-handed batsman who bowled right-arm medium pace. He was born at Leicester, Leicestershire.

Thompson made two first-class appearances for Leicestershire against Derbyshire and Warwickshire in the 1937 County Championship. He scored 11 runs with a high score of 5 in his two matches.

He died in May 1987 in the city of his birth.
