= James Francis Fulloon =

New Zealand interpreter and public servant

James Francis Fulloon (12 August 1840 – 22 July 1865) was a New Zealand interpreter and public servant. He was born in Whakatāne, Bay of Plenty, New Zealand on 12 August 1840.
