= Nukan, Kermanshah =

Nukan نوكان
- Neighbourhood
- Location within Iran
- Coordinates: 34°21′39″N 47°10′21″E
- Country: Iran
- Province: Kermanshah
- County: Kermanshah
- Bakhsh: Central

Population (2006)
  - Total: 10,377
- Time zone: UTC+3:30 (IRST)
  - Summer (DST): UTC+4:30 (IRDT)

Nukan (Persian: نوكان, also Romanized as Nūkān, Nookan, Nowkān; also known as Naūkān) is a Neighbourhood in Kermanshah, Iran. It was a village in Dorudfaraman Rural District, in the Central District of Kermanshah County, Kermanshah Province, Iran. In 2012, this village, along with several other villages, was annexed to the urban area of Kermanshah and became one of the neighborhoods of that city. At the 2006 census, its population was 10,377, in 2,563 families.
