= Charles Robert Norris Mackie =

New Zealand pacifist and social reformer

Charles Robert Norris Mackie (30 April 1869–15 October 1943) was a New Zealand pacifist and social reformer. He was born in Avonside, North Canterbury, New Zealand on 30 April 1869.
