= Sally Low =

New Zealand teacher, social reformer and peace campaigner

Caroline Sarah "Sally" Low (née Howard; 23 March 1876 – 10 August 1934) was a New Zealand teacher, social reformer and peace campaigner. She was born in Loburn, New Zealand, on 23 March 1876.
