= Arthur Thompson (Australian footballer) =

Australian rules footballer

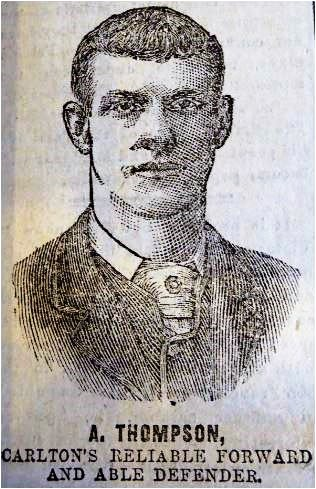
- Thompson in 1893

Personal information
- Full name: Arthur Ernest Thompson
- Born: 6 November 1871; Williamstown, Victoria
- Died: 26 June 1955 (aged 83); Williamstown, Victoria
- Original team: North Williamstown

Playing career^{1}
Years	Club	Games (Goals)
1899–1901	Carlton	22 (2)
- ^{1} Playing statistics correct to the end of 1901.

Arthur Ernest Thompson (6 November 1871 – 26 June 1955) was an Australian rules footballer who played for the Carlton Football Club in the Victorian Football League (VFL).
