= Tohi Te Ururangi =

New Zealand tribal leader and assessor

Tohi Te Ururangi (died 28 April 1864) was a notable New Zealand tribal leader and assessor. Of Māori descent, he identified with the Ngāti Whakaue iwi.
