= Benjamin Sutherland =

New Zealand railway clerk, grocer, businessman and philanthropist

Benjamin Sutherland (1873–1949) was a New Zealand railway clerk, grocer, businessman and philanthropist. He was born in Seaward Bush, Southland, New Zealand in 1873.
