= Nuka Taipari =

Nuka Taipari (?–8 November 1863) was a New Zealand tribal leader, warrior and tohunga. Of Māori descent, he identified with the Ngāi Te Rangi iwi.
