= Henry Powning Stark =

New Zealand politician

New Zealand Parliament
Years	Term	Electorate	Party
1861	3rd	Napier	Independent

Henry Powning Stark (1827–1870) was a 19th-century Member of Parliament in Hawke's Bay, New Zealand.

He represented the Napier electorate in 1861; from 19 February to 27 April, when he resigned.

He died in Thames or in the Imperial Hotel, Pollen Street on 5 or 7 July 1870 aged 43y. He had pneumonia and had been having "business difficulties"; he left his wife and family "entirely unprovided for".

New Zealand Parliament
New constituency	Member of Parliament for Napier; 1861	Succeeded by William Colenso
