= Arthur Tomson =

English painter

- Born: 5 March 1859; Chelmsford, United Kingdom
- Died: 14 June 1905 (aged 46); Robertsbridge, United Kingdom
- Occupation: Painter
- Spouse(s): Rosamund Marriott Watson (married 1887-1896); Miss Hastings (married 1898-1905)

Arthur Tomson (5 March 1859 – 14 June 1905) was an English painter.

== Biography ==
Tomson was born at Chelmsford, Essex, on 5 March 1859. He was the sixth child of Whitbread Tomson by his wife Elizabeth Maria. From a preparatory school at Ingatestone in Essex, he went to Uppingham. As a young boy, he developed an interest in art and, on leaving school, he enrolled in a course in Düsseldorf. Returning to England in 1882, he settled down to landscape painting, working chiefly in Sussex and Dorset. His landscapes were poetic, and rather similar in sentiment to the art of George Mason and Edward Stott. Although he was at his best in landscape, cats were favourite subjects of study, and he occasionally painted other animals.

At the New English Art Club, of which he was an early member and in whose affairs he took warm interest, he was a regular exhibitor, but he also showed at the Royal Academy from 1883 to 1892 and at the New Gallery. An excellent and characteristic example of his refined art is the canvas called The Chalk Pit, which was presented by his widow to the Victoria and Albert Museum. He was also an interesting writer on art, and his book on Jean-François Millet and the Barbizon School (1903; reissued in 1905) is sympathetic and discriminating. For some years, he was an art critic for the 'Morning Leader,' under the pseudonym of Verind, and he contributed to the Art Journal descriptions of places in the southern counties, illustrated by his own drawings. He illustrated Concerning Cats, poems selected by his first wife Rosamund (Ball) Marriott Watson under the pen name, 'Graham R. Tomson' (1892).

He died on 14 June 1905 at Robertsbridge and was buried in Steeple churchyard, near Wareham, in Dorset. In 1887, Tomson married his first wife Rosamund (Ball) Marriott Watson (1863–1911), a writer of poetry, youngest child of Benjamin Williams Ball, whom he divorced in 1896, and who afterwards married Mr. H. B. Marriott Watson. Tomson married secondly in 1898 Miss Hastings, a descendant of Warren Hastings, who survived him with a son.
