= Helen Ann Wilson =

New Zealand nurse and community leader

- Born: c. 1793; Gibraltar
- Died: 1871; New Plymouth, New Zealand
- Occupations: Nurse and community leader
- Spouse: Peter Wilson

Helen Ann Wilson (c. 1793–1871) was a New Zealand nurse and community leader. She was born in Gibraltar in about 1793 and her father, James Simpson, was the United States consul general at Tangier.

== Personal life ==
On 11 June 1840 in London, England, Helen married Peter Wilson, superintendent of the civil hospital at Gibraltar. He would become colonial surgeon in New Zealand in 1849. Although The couple had no children, they raised Patricio, Peter Wilson's son from a former relationship.
