= Arthur Thomson (military surgeon) =

Scottish medical scientist, writer and historian (1816–1860)

Arthur Saunders Thomson
- Born: 9 December 1816; Arbroath, Angus, Scotland
- Died: 4 November 1860 (aged 43); Pekin, China
- Cause of death: Rupture of an abscess of the liver into the abdominal cavity
- Burial place: Russian Cemetery, Pekin, China
- Education: University of Edinburgh
- Spouse: Ngāhiraka Wood
- Children: 3
- Military career
- Allegiance: United Kingdom
- Branch: (United Kingdom of Great Britain and Ireland) British Army
- Service years: 1838–1860
- Rank: Surgeon Major
- Service number: 4525
- Units: 17th (Leicestershire) Regiment of Foot, 1838– 14th (The King's) Regiment of Light Dragoons, 1842– 58th (Rutlandshire) Regiment of Foot, 1847– Staff, 1859–60
- Commands: PMO, 2nd Division, British Expeditionary Force, China, 1860
- Awards: Gold Medal prize for MD thesis, Medical Faculty, University of Edinburgh, 1837
- Memorials: Cenotaph, Saint John Episcopal Graveyard, Edinburgh, Scotland

Surgeon Major Arthur Saunders Thomson (29 December 1816 – 4 November 1860) was a notable Scottish military surgeon, medical scientist, writer and historian. He was born in Arbroath, Angus, Scotland in 1816.

He joined the British Army on 19 October 1838 as an assistant surgeon to the 17th (Leicestershire) Regiment of Foot and was stationed in India with the 14th (The King's) Regiment of Light Dragoons until 1847. There, he wrote about the epidemic of fever among his regiment during the monsoon season. Upon his return to England, he was appointed surgeon to the 58th (Rutlandshire) Regiment of Foot and sent to New Zealand. In New Zealand he wrote extensively about disease statistics among Māori and European populations and climatology.

Thomson's book, The Story of New Zealand: Past and Present, Savage and Civilized (1859), is generally considered to be the first scholarly history of the island country.

He was promoted to surgeon major in 1858 and was sent back to England. A year later, he was placed in charge of the hospital steamship Mauritius and sent to China where he was in medical charge of the 2nd Division, British Expeditionary Force. He died there on 4 November 1860 and was buried in the Russian cemetery, Pekin.

== Publications ==
- Thomson, Arthur Saunders (1837). Prize Thesis. Inaugural Dissertation on the Influence of Climate on the Health and Mortality of the Inhabitants of the Different Regions of the Globe (Medical Faculty, University of Edinburgh, MD thesis). Edinburgh: John Carfrae & Son – via Wellcome Collection.
- Thomson, Arthur Saunders (1 July 1838). "ART. VII1.-A Statistical Inquiry on Fever, being an attempt to ascertain the prevalence, susceptibility, intensity, and prognosis, with some observations on the influence of Medical Treatment". Edinburgh Medical and Surgical Journal. 50 (136): 87–118. PMC 5772278. PMID 30330241.
- Thomson, Arthur Saunders (1840). "Art. V. On the Doctrine of Acclimatization". The Madras Quarterly Medical Review. 2. Madras: Union Press: 69–76.
- Thomson, Arthur Saunders (1843). "Article IV. Could the natives of a temperate climate colonize and increase in a tropical country and vice versa?". Transactions of the Medical and Physical Society of Bombay (6). Bombay: Medical and Physical Society of Bombay: 112–138.
- Thomson, Arthur Saunders (1849). Pukapuka ki nga tangata Maori, hei tohu i a ratou i te mate koroputaputa. Akarana (Auckland): Williamson & Wilson – via NLNZ.
- Thomson, Arthur Saunders (1 July 1850). "On the Influence of the Climate of New Zealand in the Production of Disease among Emigrants from Great Britain". Edinburgh Medical and Surgical Journal. 74 (184): 82–91. PMC 5800638. PMID 30331077.
- Thomson, Arthur Saunders (September 1851). "A Statistical Account of Auckland, New Zealand, as it was Observed During the Year 1848". Journal of the Statistical Society of London. 14 (3): 227–249. doi:10.2307/2338338. JSTOR 2338338.
- Thomson, Arthur Saunders (1853). "III. Observations on the Stature, Bodily Weight, Magnitude of Chest, and Physical Strength of the New Zealand Race of Men". Journal of the Royal Geographical Society of London. 23. London: John Murray: 87–93. doi:10.2307/1797950. JSTOR 1797950.
- Thomson, Arthur Saunders (July 1853). "On the Discovery of a Frog in New Zealand". The Edinburgh New Philosophical Journal. 55 (109). Edinburgh: Adam and Charles Black: 66–69.
- Thomson, Arthur Saunders (10 December 1853). "Observations on the Climate of the North Island of New Zealand". New Zealand. Further Papers Relative to the Affairs of New Zealand. 1860. London: Her Majesty's Stationery Office. pp. 16–23.
- Thomson, Arthur Saunders (April 1854). "Description of Two Caves in the North Island of New Zealand, in which were found Bones of the large extinct wingless Bird, called the Natives, Moa, and by the Naturalists Dinornis; with some general Observations on the Genus of Birds". The Edinburgh New Philosophical Journal. 56 (112). Edinburgh: Adam and Charles Black: 268–295.
- Thomson, Arthur Saunders (April 1854). "On the Peculiarities in Figure, the Disfigurations, and the Customs of the New Zealanders; with Remarks on Their Diseases, and on Their Modes of Treatment". The British and Foreign Medico-Chirurgical Review. 13 (26): 489–502. PMC 5800638. PMID 30331077.
- Thomson, Arthur Saunders (April 1855). "On the Peculiarities in Figure, the Disfigurations, and the Customs of the New Zealanders; with Remarks on Their Diseases, and on Their Modes of Treatment". The British and Foreign Medico-Chirurgical Review. 15 (30): 520–529. PMC 5184339. PMID 30164355.
- Thomson, Arthur Saunders (1859). The Story of New Zealand: Past and Present, Savage and Civilized. Vol. 1. London: John Murray – via Internet Archive.
- Thomson, Arthur Saunders (1859). The Story of New Zealand: Past and Present, Savage and Civilized. Vol. 2. London: John Murray – via Internet Archive.
