= Philip Philips =

New Zealand politician (1831–1913)

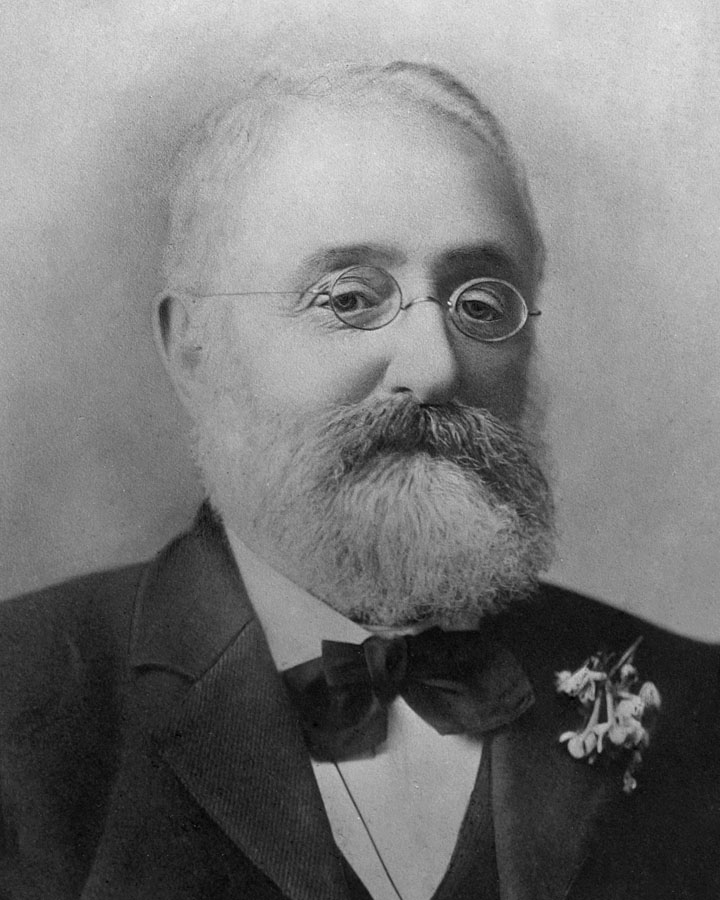

1st Mayor of Auckland City
- In office 1871–1874
- Succeeded by: Henry Isaacs

Personal details
- Born: Philip Aaron Philips; 11 June 1831 Brighton, England
- Died: 3 June 1913 (aged 81) Sydney, New South Wales, Australia
- Resting place: Rookwood Cemetery
- Spouse: Annie Myers

Philip Aaron Philips (11 June 1831 – 3 June 1913) was a New Zealand politician who served as the first mayor of Auckland City. He held the office from 1871 to 1874 and immediately prior to that, he was chairman of the City Board. He was a member of the Auckland Provincial Council and the Auckland Harbour Board.

== Early life and family ==
Philips was born in Brighton, England, on 11 June 1831, into a Jewish family. He worked in a wholesale firm in London from 1845 to 1848. He then emigrated to New Zealand and arrived in Auckland in August 1848. After a year, he built himself a store in Vulcan Lane off Queen Street. After some years, he fell ill and went to Sydney for recovery. There, he married Annie Myers, the daughter of Israel and Esther Myers. The couple returned to Auckland and Philips opened a second hardware store; this one in lower Queen Street. He was bankrupted in the post-war economic bust following the New Zealand Wars.

His wife died on 18 February 1888 at age 52. She was buried in the Jewish part of Symonds Street Cemetery. There was a large attendance at her funeral, with "nearly every member of the Jewish community" present, plus the mayor (Albert Devore) and many of the city councillors.

== Municipal career ==
Philips became politically active in 1869. He stood for election to the city board (the predecessor of the municipal council) on 23 June 1869 but withdrew on election day. At the next meeting of the City Board, he was proposed as the board's chairman (chairmen did not necessarily have to be board members) but he was not elected. On 26 November 1869, he was one of three members elected to the sixth Auckland Provincial Council in the Auckland East electorate (the other two were Henry Ellis and William John Hurst). Philips remained a member of the provincial council until 5 March 1875. Within days of getting elected to the provincial council, the City Board needed to elect another chairman and this time, Philips was elected unanimously to that position on 16 December 1869. In May 1871, Auckland was gazetted a borough council and the legislation commuted the City Board representatives to become the inaugural councillors. Philips, who was still chairman at that point, was unanimously elected by his fellow councillors as inaugural mayor and held this office until 1874. His successor, Henry Isaacs, was also a Jewish merchant. Philips was a member of the Auckland Harbour Board.

When Philips retired from the mayoralty, he became the city's town clerk and remained in that role until 1899.

== Retirement ==
By May 1901, Philips had moved to Sydney. He died at the Sydney Sanitarium in Wahroonga in June 1913.

Political offices
First	Mayor of Auckland City; 1871–1874	Succeeded by Henry Isaacs
