= George Arney =

New Zealand judge and politician (1810–1883)

The Honourable Sir George Arney

2nd Chief Justice of New Zealand
- In office 1858–1875
- Nominated by: Edward Stafford
- Appointed by: Thomas Gore Browne
- Preceded by: William Martin
- Succeeded by: James Prendergast

Personal details
- Born: 1810 Salisbury, United Kingdom
- Died: 7 April 1883 (aged 72–73) Torquay, United Kingdom
- Spouse: Harriet Parr

Sir George Alfred Arney (1810 – 7 April 1883) was the second Chief Justice of New Zealand.

== Early life ==
Arney was born in 1810 in Salisbury, England. His parents were William Arney, a barrister, and Maria Charlotte Arney. He was educated at Winchester and Brasenose College, Oxford. He graduated with a Bachelor of Arts in 1832 and a Master of Arts in 1833. He was admitted to Lincoln's Inn in 1829, and received his call to the bar in 1837.

He married Harriet Parr in 1835, but his wife died only seven years later.

== New Zealand ==
He was appointed by the Colonial Office on the advice of Justice Lord Coleridge on 2 September 1857, and arrived in Auckland, New Zealand, on the brig Gertrude on 19 February 1858. He was Chief Justice from 1858 to 1875. He was appointed Administrator of the Government under Governor Sir George Bowen on 1 October 1869 and assumed office on 21 March 1873. Arney administered the country for three months between the departure of Sir George Bowen and the arrival of Sir James Fergusson. Arney retired from that role on 14 June 1873 with the arrival of Fergusson.

He was appointed to the Legislative Council on 20 February 1858 (the day after his arrival in the country) and remained a legislative councillor until his resignation on 13 June 1866.

Arney was knighted in 1862 while Chief Justice.

Governor George Grey resigned Arney's judgeship in 1875. Arney retired to Torquay in England. His brother, Colonel Arney, who had previously served with the 58th Regiment in New Zealand, died on 6 April 1879 in Cheltenham. Arney received a significant inheritance from his brother.

== Death and commemoration ==
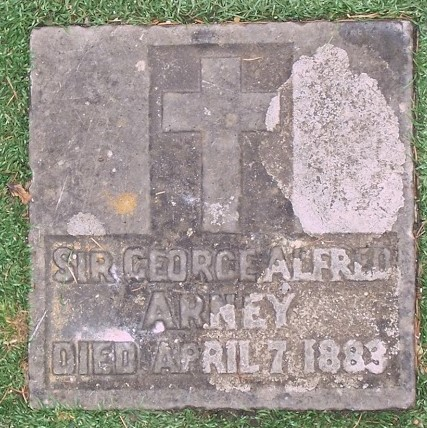
The tomb of Sir George Arney in Salisbury cathedral

He died in Torquay on 7 April 1883. Arney Street in Paeroa, which is part of State Highway 26, is named for him. He is buried in the courtyard of Salisbury Cathedral.

== Notes ==
Legal offices
| Preceded by William Martin | Chief Justice of New Zealand; 1858–1875 | Succeeded by James Prendergast |
