= Electoral history of George Grey =

List of elections featuring George Grey as a candidate

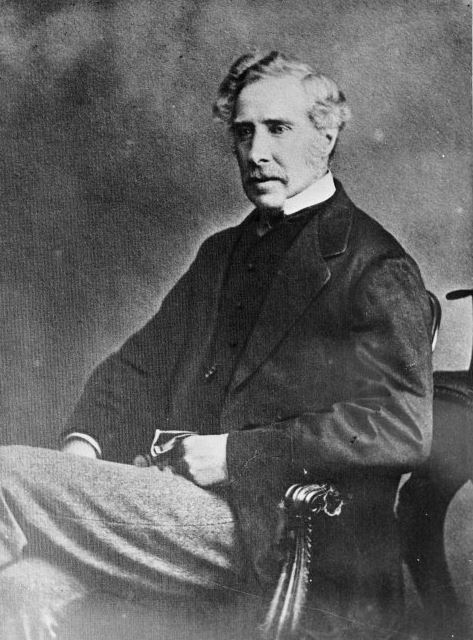
George Grey, around the time of his Premiership.

This is a summary of the electoral history of Sir George Grey, Prime Minister of New Zealand, (1877–1879). He represented six electorates during his political career.

== Parliamentary elections ==
Grey's first electoral contest in 1870 was fought in the United Kingdom parliamentary constituency of Newark. Subsequent electoral contests were all in New Zealand.

=== 1870 by-election ===
1870 Newark by-election
Party	Candidate	Votes	%	±%
Liberal	Samuel Bristowe	827	54.0	+17.8
Conservative	William Campbell Sleigh	653	42.6	
Independent Liberal	Sir George Grey	52	3.4	
Majority		174	11.4	+4.9
Turnout		1,532	85.0	+3.7
Registered electors		1,803		

=== 1875 by-election ===
1875 Auckland West by-election
Party	Candidate	Votes	%	±%
Independent	Sir George Grey	Unopposed		
Registered electors				

=== 1876 election ===
1876 general election, Auckland West
Party	Candidate	Votes	%	±%
Independent	Sir George Grey^{a}	Unopposed		
Independent	Patrick Dignan	Unopposed		
Registered electors				

^{a} Grey resigned from the Auckland West seat after he was elected in the Thames electorate. A petition against his election for Thames had been filed on the following day, on the grounds that he had already been elected in Auckland West (see 1875–1876 New Zealand general election). This was unresolved for several months, and Grey telegrammed in June that he chose to represent Auckland West. However when the committee reported on 8 July that his election for Thames was valid but that he had to choose which electorate to represent, he telegrammed that he chose to represent Thames. A by-election (1876 Auckland West by-election) was held to replace Grey in Auckland West.

1876 general election, Thames
Party	Candidate	Votes	%	±%
Independent	Sir George Grey	984	67.53	
Independent	William Rowe	862	59.16	
Independent	Sir Julius Vogel	685	47.01	
Independent	C F Mitchell	330	22.64	
Independent	C O'Neil	26	1.78	
Independent	C Cornes	20	1.37	
Independent	S Stephenson	7	0.48	
Majority		177	12.14	
Turnout		1,457		

=== 1879 election ===
1879 general election, Thames
Party	Candidate	Votes	%	±%
Independent	Sir George Grey	Unopposed		
Independent	John Sheehan	Unopposed		
Registered electors				

1879 general election, Christchurch
Party	Candidate	Votes	%	±%
Independent	Sir George Grey^{b}	1,315	70.58	
Independent	Samuel Paull Andrews	1,250	67.09	
Independent	Edward Cephas John Stevens	1,250	67.09	
Independent	Edward Richardson	1,227	65.86	
Independent	Treadwell	548	29.41	
Majority		22	1.1	
Turnout		1,863		

^{b} Grey was unseated on petition in Christchurch, as he had already been elected in the Thames electorate. The committee decision (decided on the chairman's casting vote after a split three-three committee vote; see 1879 New Zealand general election) was the opposite to the decision on the 1876 petition.

=== 1881 election ===
1881 general election, Auckland East
Party	Candidate	Votes	%	±%
Independent	Sir George Grey	349	52.57	
Independent	J M Clark	315	47.43	
Majority		34	5.12	
Turnout		664	71.78	
Registered electors		925		

=== 1884 election ===
1884 general election, Auckland East
Party	Candidate	Votes	%	±%
Independent	Sir George Grey	Unopposed		
Registered electors		1,331		

=== 1887 election ===
1887 general election, Auckland Central
Party	Candidate	Votes	%	±%
Independent	Sir George Grey	Unopposed		
Registered electors		1,782		

=== 1891 by-election ===
1891 Newton by-election
Party	Candidate	Votes	%	±%
Independent	Sir George Grey	Unopposed		
Registered electors		2,088		

=== 1893 election ===
1893 general election: City of Auckland
Party	Candidate	Votes	%	±%
Independent	Sir George Grey	6,379	62.57	
Conservative	William Crowther	4,584	44.96	
Conservative	Charles Button	4,214	41.34	
Conservative	Thomas Tudehope	4,146	40.67	
Liberal	Thomas Thompson	3,950	38.75	−20.23
Liberal	William Joseph Napier	3,531	34.64	−7.18
Independent Liberal	Edward Withy	2,393	23.47	
Liberal	John Shera	793	7.78	−55.85
Liberal	Samuel Vaile	502	4.92	
Liberal	Thomas Fernandez	92	0.90	
Majority		68	0.67	
Turnout		10,195	60.73	+14.30
Registered electors		16,788		
