= Withy (surname) =

Withy is a surname. Notable people with the surname include:

- Arthur Withy (1870–1943), New Zealand journalist and political activist, son of Edward Withy
- Edward Withy (c. 1844–1927), English shipbuilder and New Zealand politician
- George Withy (1924–1998), English journalist, great nephew of Edward Withy
- Henry Withy (1852–1922), English shipbuilding manager, brother of Edward Withy
- Katherine A. Withy, New Zealand philosopher
