= 1869 Newton by-election =

New Zealand by-election

The 1869 Newton by-election was a by-election held on 19 March 1869 during the 4th New Zealand Parliament in the Auckland electorate of Newton.

The by-election was caused by the resignation of the incumbent MP George Graham.

He was replaced by Robert James Creighton. Some electors were opposed to the centralising of government in Wellington which they suggested Wrigg favoured.

== Results ==
1869 Newton by-election
Party	Candidate	Votes	%	±%
Independent	Robert James Creighton	205	64.47	
Independent	Henry Wrigg	113	35.53	
Turnout		318		
Majority		92	28.93	
