= 1879 City of Auckland West by-election =

New Zealand by-election

The 1879 City of Auckland West by-election was a by-election held on 4 March 1879 in the City of Auckland West electorate during the 6th New Zealand Parliament. It was then a two-member electorate.

The by-election was caused by the resignation of the incumbent, Patrick Dignan, who had previously represented the electorate. He was a Catholic layman, and a supporter of denominational education.

David Goldie was elected. He supported secular education, and his victory was headlined "Another election victory for Secularists". Similarly the winner of the 1879 City of Nelson by-election was described as a "Secularist".

== Result ==
The following table gives the election result:

1879 City of Auckland West by-election
Party	Candidate	Votes	%	±%
Independent	David Goldie	776	74.83	
Independent	Patrick Dignan	261	25.17	
Turnout		1037		
Majority		515	49.66	
