= Auckland West =

The former New Zealand parliamentary electorate on the western inner city of Auckland, was known as City of Auckland West from 1861 to 1890, and then Auckland West from 1905 to 1946.

== Population centres ==
From 1861 to 1884 the electorate comprised the suburbs of Ponsonby, Grey Lynn and Herne Bay. With the creation of the Ponsonby electorate for the 1887 election, Auckland West was moved south to include Grey Lynn, Newton and Kingsland.

From 1890 to 1905, Auckland West – along with Auckland Central and Auckland East – were merged into the multi-member City of Auckland electorate. In 1903 the Parliament passed the City Single Electorates Act, abolishing multi-member electorates from the end of the 15th Parliament in 1905.

The three inner-city Auckland electorates were recreated in 1905, with Auckland West first comprising the suburbs of Ponsonby, Herne Bay, Newton and parts of Grey Lynn; and from 1908 to 1946 covering Ponsonby and Herne Bay.

== History ==
The City of Auckland West electorate was created for the election held on 11 January 1861 and it lasted to 1890. During this period, City of Auckland West was a two-member electorate.

At the first election in 1861, Josiah Firth and John Williamson were elected. Firth resigned on 30 April 1862, and was succeeded by James Williamson (no relation to John Williamson) in the 1862 by-election.

In the December 1875 election, Sir George Grey and Patrick Dignan were the only candidates in the two-member electorate and were thus declared elected. In January 1876, Grey also contested and won a seat in the Thames electorate. A protest against Grey's election was lodged with the returning officer the following day, stating that Grey had not been eligible to stand for election in Thames, as he had already been elected in Auckland West. This petition was filed to the House of Representatives at the end of January. On 8 July, the report of the committee inquiring into Sir George Grey's election for the Thames was read to the House. It was found that his election to the Thames electorate was in accordance with the law, but that he had to make a decision for which electorate he would sit. On 15 July 1876, Grey announced that he would represent Thames, and he moved that a by-election be held in Auckland West for the seat that he would vacate there.

The 25 July 1876 by-election caused by Grey's retirement was won by Benjamin Tonks, who resigned in 1877.

The electorate was then represented by James Wallis 1877–81, William John Hurst 1879–81 and David Goldie 1887–90.

The "Auckland West" electorate was created in 1905, and lasted to 1946. It was held for 1905–11 & 1914–19 by Charles Poole, 1911–14 by James Bradney, and from 1919 until he died in 1940 by revered Labour prime minister Michael Joseph Savage. The next holder Peter Carr 1940–46 also died while holding the seat.

== Members of Parliament ==
Key

Independent Liberal Reform Labour

=== multi-member electorate ===
From 1861 to 1881, City of Auckland West was a two-member electorate.

Election	Winners	
1861 election	John Williamson	Josiah Firth
1862 by-election	John Williamson	James Williamson
1866 election	John Williamson	James Williamson
1867 by-election	John Williamson	Patrick Dignan
1871 election	John Williamson	Thomas Gillies
1871 by-election	John Williamson	Thomas Gillies
1875 (1st) by-election	John Williamson	George Grey
1875 (2nd) by-election	Patrick Dignan (2nd period)	George Grey
1875 election	Patrick Dignan (2nd period)	George Grey
1876 by-election	Patrick Dignan (2nd period)	Benjamin Tonks
1877 by-election	Patrick Dignan (2nd period)	James Wallis
1879 by-election	David Goldie	James Wallis
1879 election	William John Hurst	James Wallis
(Electorate converted to single member in 1881)

=== single member electorate ===
Election	Winner
1881 election	Joseph Dargaville
1884 election	Joseph Dargaville
1887 election	David Goldie (2nd period)
(Electorate abolished 1890–1905, see City of Auckland)
1905 election	Charles Poole
1908 election	Charles Poole
1911 election	James Bradney
1914 election	Charles Poole (2nd period)
1919 election	Michael Joseph Savage
1922 election	Michael Joseph Savage
1925 election	Michael Joseph Savage
1928 election	Michael Joseph Savage
1931 election	Michael Joseph Savage
1935 election	Michael Joseph Savage
1938 election	Michael Joseph Savage
1940 by-election	Peter Carr
1943 election	Peter Carr
(electorate abolished 1946; see Mount Albert)

== Election results ==
=== 1943 election ===
1943 general election: Auckland West
Party	Candidate	Votes	%	±%
Labour	Peter Carr	9,269	61.71	−1.53
National	John W. Kealy	3,867	25.74	
Democratic Labour	Pat Curran	1,447	9.63	
People's Movement	Howard Moncrieff Bagnall	232	1.54	
Informal votes		203	1.35	+0.65
Majority		5,402	35.97	+3.14
Turnout		15,018	72.68	+12.65
Registered electors				

=== 1940 by-election ===
1940 Auckland West by-election
Party	Candidate	Votes	%	±%
Labour	Peter Carr	6,151	63.24	
Independent	Wilfred Fortune	2,958	30.41	
Communist	Gordon Watson	375	3.86	
Ind. Socialist	Lawrence Pickles	132	1.36	
Liberal	Joseph Kennedy	15	0.15	
Independent	Enoch Naden	8	0.08	
Informal votes		68	0.70	+0.05
Majority		3,193	32.83	
Turnout		8,136	60.03	−29.73
Registered electors		16,170		
Labour hold		Swing		

=== 1938 election ===
1938 general election: Auckland West
Party	Candidate	Votes	%	±%
Labour	Michael Joseph Savage	11,591	75.88	+2.95
National	John W. Kealy	3,584	23.46	
Informal votes		100	0.65	−0.46
Majority		8,007	52.41	−0.20
Turnout		15,275	89.76	+1.20
Registered electors		17,017		

=== 1935 election ===
1935 general election: Auckland West
Party	Candidate	Votes	%	±%
Labour	Michael Joseph Savage	8,567	72.93	+10.00
United	Ernest David Stallworthy	2,387	20.32	
Democrat	Joseph Alexander Govan	792	6.74	
Informal votes		131	1.11	+0.50
Majority		6,180	52.61	+8.49
Turnout		11,746	88.56	+8.78
Registered electors		13,263		

=== 1931 election ===
1931 general election: Auckland West
Party	Candidate	Votes	%	±%
Labour	Michael Joseph Savage	6,442	62.93	+15.92
United	Hugh Ross Mackenzie	1,925	18.80	
Reform	John Allum	1,870	18.27	
Informal votes		63	0.61	−0.23
Majority		4,517	44.12	+32.36
Turnout		10,300	79.78	−6.47
Registered electors		12,911		

=== 1928 election ===
1928 general election: Auckland West
Party	Candidate	Votes	%	±%
Labour	Michael Joseph Savage	5,361	47.01	−5.18
United	Richard Speirs	4,020	35.25	
Reform	Frank Adeane	2,021	17.72	
Informal votes		97	0.84	−0.27
Majority		1,341	11.76	+7.38
Turnout		11,499	86.25	−3.30
Registered electors		13,331		

=== 1925 election ===
1925 general election: Auckland West
Party	Candidate	Votes	%	±%
Labour	Michael Joseph Savage	5,677	52.19	−3.23
Reform	Samuel Oldfield	5,201	47.81	
Informal votes		122	1.11	−0.39
Majority		476	4.38	−8.66
Turnout		11,000	89.55	−2.53
Registered electors		12,283		

=== 1922 election ===
1922 general election: Auckland West
Party	Candidate	Votes	%	±%
Labour	Michael Joseph Savage	5,649	55.42	+11.18
Reform	John Farrell	4,345	42.63	
Informal votes		153	1.50	+0.59
Majority		1,304	13.04	+7.16
Turnout		10,192	92.08	+6.61
Registered electors		11,068		

=== 1919 election ===
1919 general election: Auckland West
Party	Candidate	Votes	%	±%
Labour	Michael Joseph Savage	4,008	44.24	
Reform	Charles Frederick Bennett	3,475	38.35	
Liberal	Andrew Entrican	1,493	16.48	
Informal votes		83	0.91	−0.10
Majority		533	5.88	
Turnout		9,059	85.47	+2.17
Registered electors		10,599		

=== 1914 election ===
1914 general election: Auckland West
Party	Candidate	Votes	%	±%
Liberal	Charles Poole	4,827	58.55	+16.77
Reform	James Bradney	3,416	41.44	−15.31
Informal votes		84	1.01	−0.45
Majority		1,411	17.11	
Turnout		8,243	83.30	+2.38
Registered electors		9,895		

=== 1911 election ===
1911 general election: Auckland West
Party	Candidate	Votes	%	±%
Reform	James Bradney	4,273	56.75	
Liberal	Charles Poole	3,146	41.78	−17.97
Informal votes		110	1.46	−0.10
Majority		1,127	14.96	
Turnout		7,529	85.68	+6.42
Registered electors		8,787		

=== 1908 election ===
1908 general election: Auckland West
Party	Candidate	Votes	%	±%
Liberal	Charles Poole	4,126	59.75	+20.05
Independent Liberal	Robert Thompson	2,671	38.68	
Informal votes		108	1.56	+0.56
Majority		1,455	21.07	+15.75
Turnout		6,905	79.26	−6.90
Registered electors		8,711		

=== 1905 election ===
1905 general election: Auckland West
Party	Candidate	Votes	%	±%
Liberal	Charles Poole	2,534	39.70	
Conservative	James Parr	2,194	34.37	
Liberal–Labour	Thomas Taylor Masefield	1,590	24.91	
Informal votes		64	1.00	
Majority		340	5.32	
Turnout		6,382	86.16	
Registered electors		7,407		

=== 1879 by-election ===
1879 City of Auckland West by-election
Party	Candidate	Votes	%	±%
Independent	David Goldie	776	74.83	
Independent	Patrick Dignan	261	25.17	
Turnout		1037		
Majority		515	49.66	

=== 1877 by-election ===
1877 City of Auckland West by-election
Party	Candidate	Votes	%	±%
Independent	James Wallis	470	63.69	
Independent	Robert Graham	268	36.31	
Turnout		738		
Majority		202	36.31	

=== 1876 by-election ===
1876 City of Auckland West by-election
Party	Candidate	Votes	%	±%
Independent	Benjamin Tonks	656	92.79	
Independent	Henry Warner Farnall	232	33.57	
Independent	Singleton Rochford	13	1.84	
Majority		618	87.41	
Informal votes		12		
Turnout		719		

=== April 1875 by-election ===
April 1875 City of Auckland West by-election
Party	Candidate	Votes	%	±%
Independent	Patrick Dignan	565	59.41	
Independent	Joseph Dargaville	386	40.59	
Turnout		951		
Majority		179	18.82	
