= 1877 City of Auckland West by-election =

New Zealand by-election

The 1877 City of Auckland West by-election was a by-election held on 2 May 1877 in the City of Auckland West electorate during the 6th New Zealand Parliament. It was then a two-member electorate.

The by-election was caused by the resignation of the incumbent, Benjamin Tonks.

James Wallis a clergyman was elected.

His opponent Robert Graham was a former Superintendent of Auckland Province, and there was some surprise at his defeat.

== Result ==
The following table gives the election result:

1877 City of Auckland West by-election
Party	Candidate	Votes	%	±%
Independent	James Wallis	470	63.69	
Independent	Robert Graham	268	36.31	
Turnout		738		
Majority		202	36.31	
