= Charles Poole (politician) =

New Zealand politician

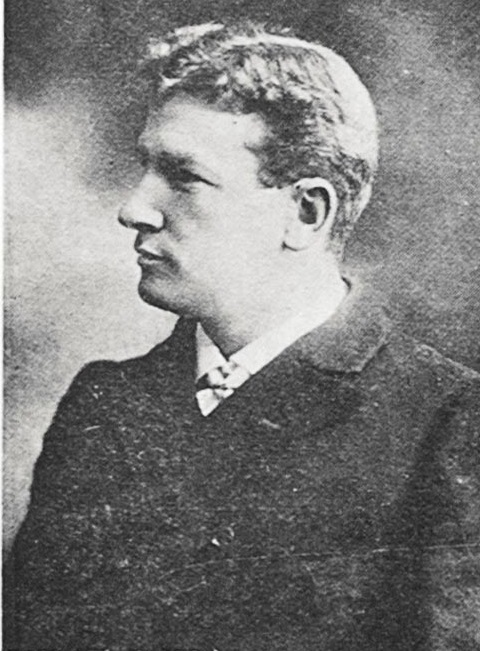

Member of the New Zealand Parliament for Auckland West
- In office 10 December 1914 – 17 December 1919
- Preceded by: James Bradney
- Succeeded by: Michael Joseph Savage
- In office 6 December 1905 – 7 December 1911
- Succeeded by: James Bradney

Personal details
- Born: 1874 Ireland
- Died: 1941 (aged 66–67) California, United States
- Party: Liberal

Charles Henry Poole (1874–1941) was a Liberal Party Member of Parliament in New Zealand.

== Early life ==
Charles Poole was born in Ireland in 1874 before moving to Australia aged 11. He was a seaman by trade and also spent time living in Canada before settling in New Zealand. Upon arriving, he became an ardent leader of the local prohibition movement.

== Political career ==
New Zealand Parliament
Years	Term	Electorate	Party
1905–1908	16th	Auckland West	Liberal
1908–1911	17th	Auckland West	Liberal
1914–1919	19th	Auckland West	Liberal

Poole won the Auckland West electorate in the 1905 general election, but was defeated in 1911 by James Bradney of the Reform Party. He won the electorate back in 1914, and retired in 1919. Poole was a dedicated Seddonite and possessed a rather aggressive oratory style, like Seddon himself.

== Death ==
Poole died in 1941 in California where he was cremated. His ashes were shipped to Auckland and interred there.

== Notes ==
New Zealand Parliament
New constituency	Member of Parliament for Auckland West; 1905–1911 1914–1919	Succeeded by James Bradney
Preceded by James Bradney	Member of Parliament for Auckland West; 1905–1911 1914–1919	Succeeded by Michael Joseph Savage
