= SS Lorrin A. Thurston =

World War II Liberty ship of the United States

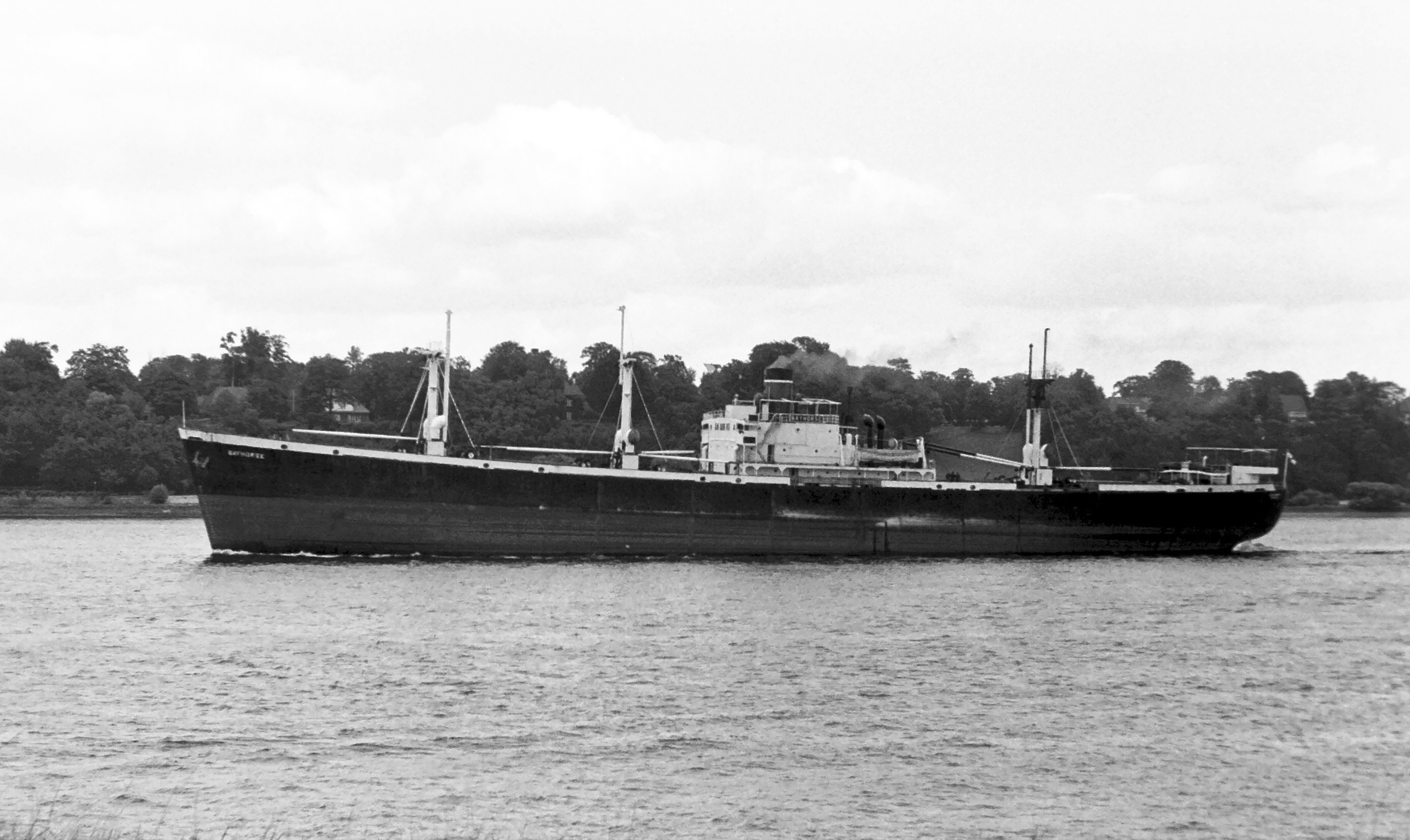
- Bayhorse in 1963

History
- Name: Lorrin A. Thurston (1943); Samcalia (1943-1947); Pacific Liberty (1947-1954); Phoebus (1954-1963); Bayhorse (1963-1970); San Gabriel (1970-1971)
- Namesake: Lorrin A. Thurston
- Operator: Furness Withy, London (1943-1954); Febo Amadeo Bertorello, Genoa (1954-1963); Seatide Shipping, Monrovia (1963-1970); Cia de Naviera Houston S.A., Panama (1970-1971)
- Builder: California Shipbuilding Corporation, Los Angeles
- Way number: 2226
- Laid down: 18 August 1943
- Launched: 10 September 1943
- Fate: Scrapped, 1971

General characteristics
- Class & type: Liberty ship
- Displacement: 14,245 long tons (14,474 t)
- Length: 441 ft 6 in (134.57 m) o/a; 417 ft 9 in (127.33 m) p/p; 427 ft (130 m) w/l
- Beam: 57 ft (17 m)
- Draft: 27 ft 9 in (8.46 m)
- Propulsion: Two oil-fired boilers; Triple-expansion steam engine; 2,500 hp (1,900 kW); Single screw
- Speed: 11 knots (20 km/h; 13 mph)
- Range: 20,000 nmi (37,000 km; 23,000 mi)
- Capacity: 10,856 t (10,685 long tons) deadweight (DWT)
- Crew: 81
- Armament: Stern-mounted 4 in (100 mm) deck gun for use against surfaced submarines, variety of anti-aircraft guns

SS Lorrin A. Thurston was a British merchant ship of World War II. A Liberty ship built in the United States in 1943, she was renamed SS Samcalia before completion, and was transferred to the British Ministry of War Transport, with Furness Withy as managers. Sold to her managers after the war, she was renamed SS Pacific Liberty in 1947. Resold in 1954, she passed through several owners, being renamed Phoebus in 1954, Bayhorse in 1963, and San Gabriel in 1970, before being scrapped in 1971. Her original namesake was Lorrin A. Thurston, a Hawaiian-American lawyer, politician, and businessman.

== Design ==
Like other Liberty ships, she was 441 feet (134 m) long and 56 feet (17 m) wide, carried 9000 tons of cargo and had a top speed of 11 knots (20 km/h). Most Liberty ships were named after prominent deceased Americans.

== Construction and career ==
The keel of the ship was laid down on 18 August 1943 at the California Shipbuilding Corporation's yard in Los Angeles. She was launched on 10 September 1943 under the name Lorrin A. Thurston. She was transferred to the British Government later that year to be completed with the name Samcalia, with Furness Withy as managers. She survived the war, and in 1947, she was sold to Furness Withy, who renamed her Pacific Liberty.

She was sold again in 1954 to Febo Amadeo Bertorello, of Genoa, who renamed her Phoebus. They operated her until 1963, when they sold her to Seatide Shipping, of Monrovia, who renamed her Bayhorse. They in turn sold her in 1970 to Cia de Naviera Houston S.A., of Panama, who renamed her San Gabriel, before scrapping her the following year. She arrived at Split on 21 January 1971 to be broken up.
