= 1867 City of Auckland West by-election =

New Zealand by-election

The 1867 City of Auckland West by-election was a by-election held on 25 April 1867 in the City of Auckland West electorate during the 4th New Zealand Parliament. It was then a two-member electorate.

The by-election was caused by the resignation of the incumbent, James Williamson.

Patrick Dignan was nominated, and as there were no other nominations he was declared elected unopposed.
