= Auckland Exhibition =

World's fair held from 1913 to 1914

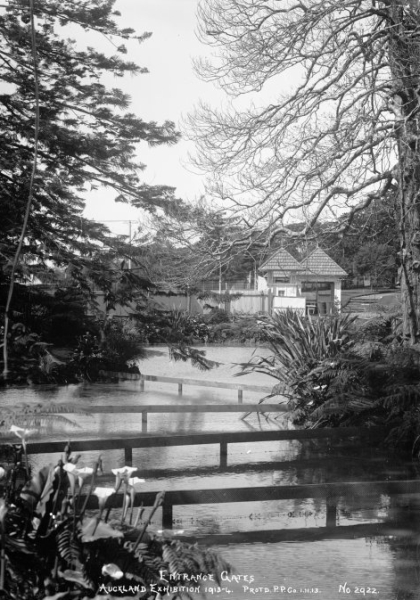
The entrance to the fair

The Auckland Exhibition, also known as the Auckland Industrial, Agricultural and Mining Exhibition, was held in Auckland Domain, Auckland, New Zealand, in 1913 and 1914.

== Opening ==
The Auckland Industrial, Agricultural and Mining Exhibition was opened on 1 December 1913 by its chairman, George Elliott, with the Prime Minister (William Massey) and mayor of Auckland (Peter Dignan) also in attendance. A message of welcome was read from King George V. There were 18,000 attendees on the opening day, and the fair ran until 18 April 1914

== Exhibits and entertainment ==
Buildings included a concert hall, art gallery, machinery court, palace of industries, and an exhibition tower. Entertainments in the fair's "Wonderland" included a water shute, toboggans, a figure-8 railway and a tea room.

== Postage stamps ==
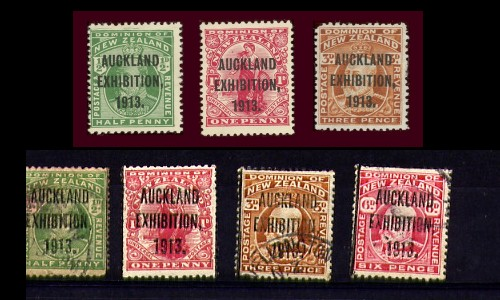
Forged overprints on 1913 New Zealand stamps.

Stamps were issued to mark the exhibition, but although the monarch was now George V, the stamps commemorating the event were overprints of Edward VII stamps. Few were sold, and forgeries are now common.
