= George Withy =

George Withy (15 May 1924 – 17 November 1998) was a journalist, member of the Press Council (UK), President of the CIOJ (1975–1976) and the great nephew of Edward Withy.

== Early life ==
Born in Birkenhead, England, George Withy attended Park High Grammar School for Boys School (Birkenhead), leaving at the age of 16 with six o-levels. He then began his career in journalism, when he joined the old Birkenhead News as a junior reporter; and at the young age of 18, spent a fortnight working as a holiday relief editor of the Bebington News. From 1942 to 1947, he served with the Royal Artillery during World War II as a wireless operator and signals expert.

== Career ==
After the war, he returned to the Birkenhead News to take charge of their Heswall and Deeside edition and to act as holiday relief editor of the Bebington News. After 18 months, he took up a post as chief reporter for the Redditch Indicator and in 1950, joined the Birmingham Post and Mail, as district reporter, working out of their Redditch offices. In the same year, he married Dorothy Betty Gray. In 1952, he was invited to return to the Redditch Indicator as editor. He stayed there for 8 years, transforming the paper from an 8-page 'old-fashioned' format, to a 16-page 'modern design'; and celebrating the newspaper's centenary through publication of a special edition. In 1960, he returned to Merseyside to work at the Liverpool Daily Post as sub-editor. Later, he became Assistant News Editor and Chief Sub-Editor for the Post and then joined the Liverpool Echo in 1970, where he was Night News Editor for many years before becoming Assistant Editor and retiring from the Echo in 1989. Following his retirement, he worked part-time at Candis Magazine for several years. In Merseyside, George Withy became synonymous with the Institute of Journalists (IOJ), now the Chartered Institute of Journalists and was for many years the Liverpool District Chairman as well as the Chairman of the National Salaries and Conditions Board, also at one point serving as a Rugby Union reporter for The Daily Telegraph.

He was a former President of the CIOJ (1975–1976) and at their 1975 conference in the Isle of Wight, he warned of "creeping Marxism" in the newspaper and magazine industry. He served twice as Chairman of the National Council for the Training of Journalists (1971 & 1972) and also served for a number of years on the Press Council (UK). On 1 March 1998 he was awarded a life Fellowship of the CIOJ.

== Personal life ==
During his time in Redditch, he entered into the life of the community, becoming chairman of the local Round Table. He was also a member of the Redditch Rotary International, becoming senior vice-president in 1959 and public relations officer for the Redditch Anglo-French Society. Apart from Rugby Union, George also spent a great deal of time training journalists and focusing his efforts towards furthering the work of the National Council for the Training of Journalists (NCTJ) and acting as the CIOJ representative on the main council for some 30 years. George Withy suffered from Alzheimer's disease during his later years, remaining at home in Irby, UK, throughout his illness and being cared for by his wife, Betty, and their two daughters, Carol and Kay. He died peacefully at home, with his family at his side. In recognition of his work supporting journalism on Merseyside, the Liverpool Journalism Centre Newsroom at the Liverpool Community College was dedicated in his memory on 11 March 1999.
