= 1891 Newton by-election =

New Zealand by-election

- 31 March 1891
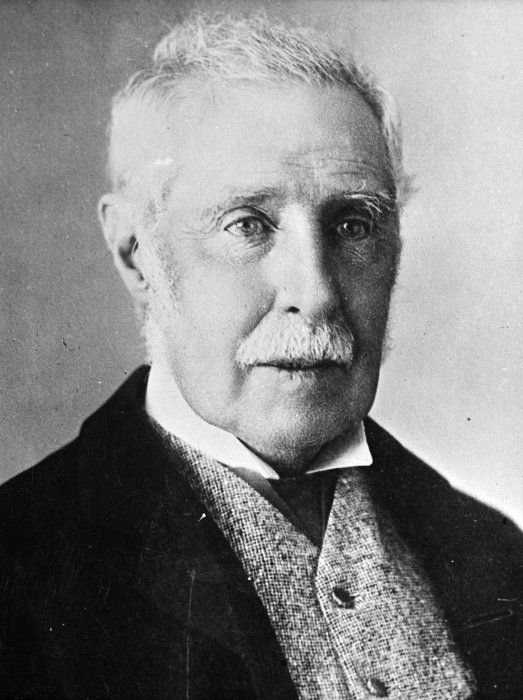
| Candidate | Sir George Grey |
| Party | Independent |
| Popular vote | elected unopposed |
MP before election
David Goldie
Elected MP
Sir George Grey

The 1891 Newton by-election was a by-election held on 31 March 1891 during the 11th New Zealand Parliament in the Auckland city electorate of Newton.

== Background ==
The by-election was caused by the resignation of the incumbent MP David Goldie because of the demands of his business.

The by-election was won by Sir George Grey. He had retired from politics, but had accepted nomination for the vacancy provided he was not opposed, so was declared elected.

He was in frail health, but had gone as a delegate to the Federation Convention in Australia. Another delegate, tired of Grey's numerous speeches inquired whether New Zealand intended to "come in". Grey replied Not at present, but we are interested in securing a Constitution which may tempt us to come in later on.
