= 1862 City of Auckland West by-election =

New Zealand by-election

The 1862 City of Auckland West by-election was a by-election held on 14 June 1862 in the City of Auckland West electorate during the 3rd New Zealand Parliament. It was then a two-member electorate, with the other member being John Williamson

The by-election was caused by the resignation of the incumbent, Josiah Firth, on 30 April 1862.

James Williamson of Remuera was declared elected unopposed, as he was the only candidate nominated.
