= Peter Carr (New Zealand politician) =

New Zealand politician

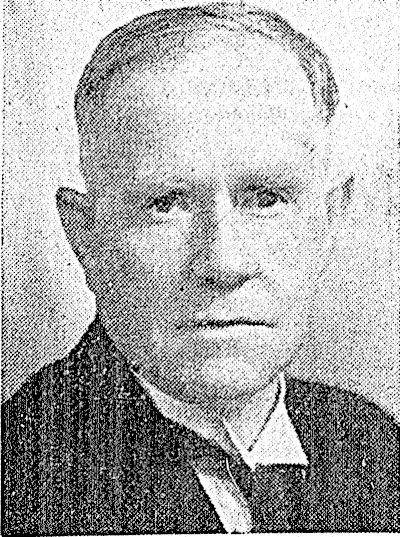

Member of the New Zealand Parliament for Auckland West
- In office 18 May 1940 – 18 October 1946
- Preceded by: Michael Joseph Savage
- Succeeded by: Seat abolished

Personal details
- Born: 1884 Papakura, New Zealand
- Died: 18 October 1946 (aged 61–62) New Zealand
- Party: Labour
- Occupation: Trade unionist

Peter Carr (1884 – 18 October 1946) was a New Zealand politician of the Labour Party.

== Private life ==
Carr was born in Papakura in 1884, the son of R. and A Carr. He was educated locally at the Papakura and Drury schools. In his youth, he played cricket and football. A quiet spoken man, he was to live in Auckland his whole life. He later entered the union movement as a career and became president of the Auckland Tramways Union, serving in the post for twelve years (1928–1940). Carr served in the New Zealand Expeditionary Force during World War I as a motorman, holding the rank of Lance Corporal.

In 1916, he married Margaret Duckworth, the daughter of A. Duckworth. In 1941, they lived in Kelmarna Avenue in Herne Bay.

== Political career ==
New Zealand Parliament
Years	Term	Electorate	Party
1940–1943	26th	Auckland West	Labour
1943–1946	27th	Auckland West	Labour

Carr was a founding member of the Labour Party, joining on its inception in 1916. He entered the political arena via local body politics and was elected as an Auckland City Councillor in 1935 and 1938. He served as the City Council's representative on the committee of the Leys Institute and was also a member of the council's works committee.

He represented the Auckland West electorate from a 1940 by-election after the previous holder, Labour prime minister Michael Joseph Savage, died in office.

Carr fell ill during the 1946 session but remained in Parliament for his vote to be counted. On 5 October, shortly before the end of that year's session, he announced his intention to retire at the upcoming general election. He died a fortnight later, on 18 October, a month before the general election.

== Notes ==
New Zealand Parliament
Preceded by Michael Joseph Savage	Member of Parliament for Auckland West; 1940–1946	Succeeded by Seat abolished
