= William Swanson (New Zealand politician) =

New Zealand politician

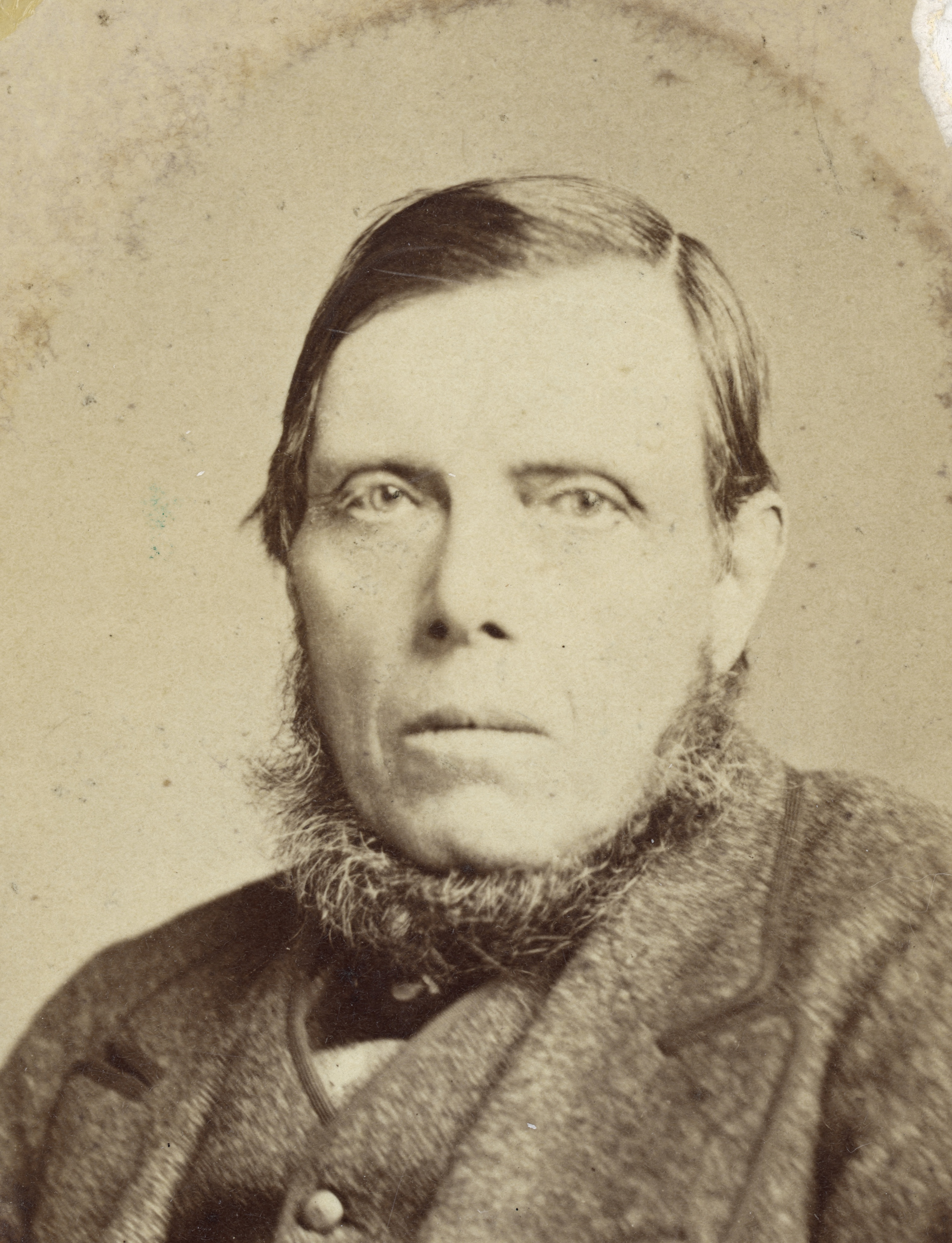
- William Swanson, ca 1878

Member of Parliament for Newton
- In office 1875–1884
- Preceded by: Robert James Creighton
- Succeeded by: Thomas Peacock

Personal details
- Born: 30 May 1819 in Leith, Scotland
- Died: 23 April 1903 (aged 83) Auckland
- Party: Independent
- Spouse(s): Mere Ngaoko Timata Titoki (m. 1853) Ani Rangitunoa (m. 1855)

William Swanson (30 May 1819 – 23 April 1903) was a 19th-century Member of Parliament in Auckland, New Zealand. An early pioneer, Swanson logged kauri on the banks of the Swanson Stream in the 1850s.

== Biography ==
New Zealand Parliament
Years	Term	Electorate	Party
1871–1875	5th	Newton	Independent
1875–1879	6th	Newton	Independent
1879–1879	7th	Newton	Independent
1881–1884	8th	Newton	Independent

Swanson was born on 30 May 1819 in Leith, Scotland. He was orphaned as a boy, and was raised by his uncle and later his paternal grandparents. He started his career in Greenock, working as a shipwright's apprentice. In 1844 he moved to Auckland, working on constructing a barque on Great Barrier Island, repairing ships in Auckland, and collected oyster shells, to be used for lime to construct the walls of the Albert Barracks. He lived on West Queen Street with his mistress Mere Ngaoko, and their two children. West Queen Street later became known as Swanson Street, due to its association with him.

In 1849, Swanson left New Zealand for the California Gold Rush. During this time, Ngaoko, believing that Swanson was dead, relocated to the Waikato with their two sons. She had a third son while living there, dying soon afterwards. Swanson returned to New Zealand in 1852, bringing his sons back to Auckland to live with him. Swanson would buy land west of Auckland from the New Zealand government, settling on the banks of the Swanson Stream, where he logged kauri until 1861. He married again twice: once to Timata Titoki in 1853, and again in 1855 to Ani Rangitunoa. Swanson's son with Titoki, George Swanson, was one of the first students to attend the Auckland Grammar School. Ani Rangitunoa was a woman of high birth from the Ngāti Te Whatuiāpiti hapū, who was from the Hawke's Bay.

Swanson began a political career in 1863, first by representing the West Ward on the Auckland City Board. He represented the Newton electorate from 1871 to 1884, when he retired. He was a minister in the Vogel Ministry, 1876 and Grey Ministry 1877–1879 as a Member of the Executive Council. He was then appointed to the Legislative Council in 1885, a position he held until his death.

In the 1870s he won a bet with John Sangster Macfarlane who had claimed that a certain politician would soon be in the Mount Eden Gaol, and used to display the cheque for £80 which he received from Macfarlane but did not cash.

In 1903, he died of heart failure. By the time of his death, Swanson had eight children, of whom seven survived and six married. A grandson was the architect William Swanson Read Bloomfield. Swanson is the namesake of the Swanson Stream, Swanson Street in the Auckland city centre, and the suburb of Swanson in West Auckland.

== Bibliography ==
- Adam, Jack; Burgess, Vivien; Ellis, Dawn (2004). Rugged Determination: Historical Window on Swanson 1854-2004. Swanson Residents and Ratepayers Association Inc. ISBN 0-476-00544-2.

New Zealand Parliament
Preceded by Robert James Creighton	Member of Parliament for Newton; 1871–1884	Succeeded by Thomas Peacock
