= 1865 Parnell by-election =

New Zealand by-election

The 1865 Parnell by-election was a by-election held on 20 April 1865 in the Parnell electorate during the 3rd New Zealand Parliament.

The by-election was caused by the resignation of the incumbent MP Reader Wood on 18 February 1865.

The by-election was won by Robert James Creighton.

As no other candidates were nominated, he was declared duly elected; Mr Creighton and Mr Coolahan had retired from the contest.
