= George Graham (ethnographer) =

George Samuel Graham (23 December 1874 – 11 April 1952) was a New Zealand accountant, lawyer, ethnographer and native agent. He was born in Auckland, New Zealand on 23 December 1874. His grandfather was George Graham, a parliamentarian, and his mother was the sister of John Sheehan, a cabinet minister.

Graham was a member of the Polynesian Society and researched Māori history, language, culture and artefacts. He also founded the Te Akarana Māori Association in 1927.
