= Swanson, New Zealand =

Swanson
- Suburb
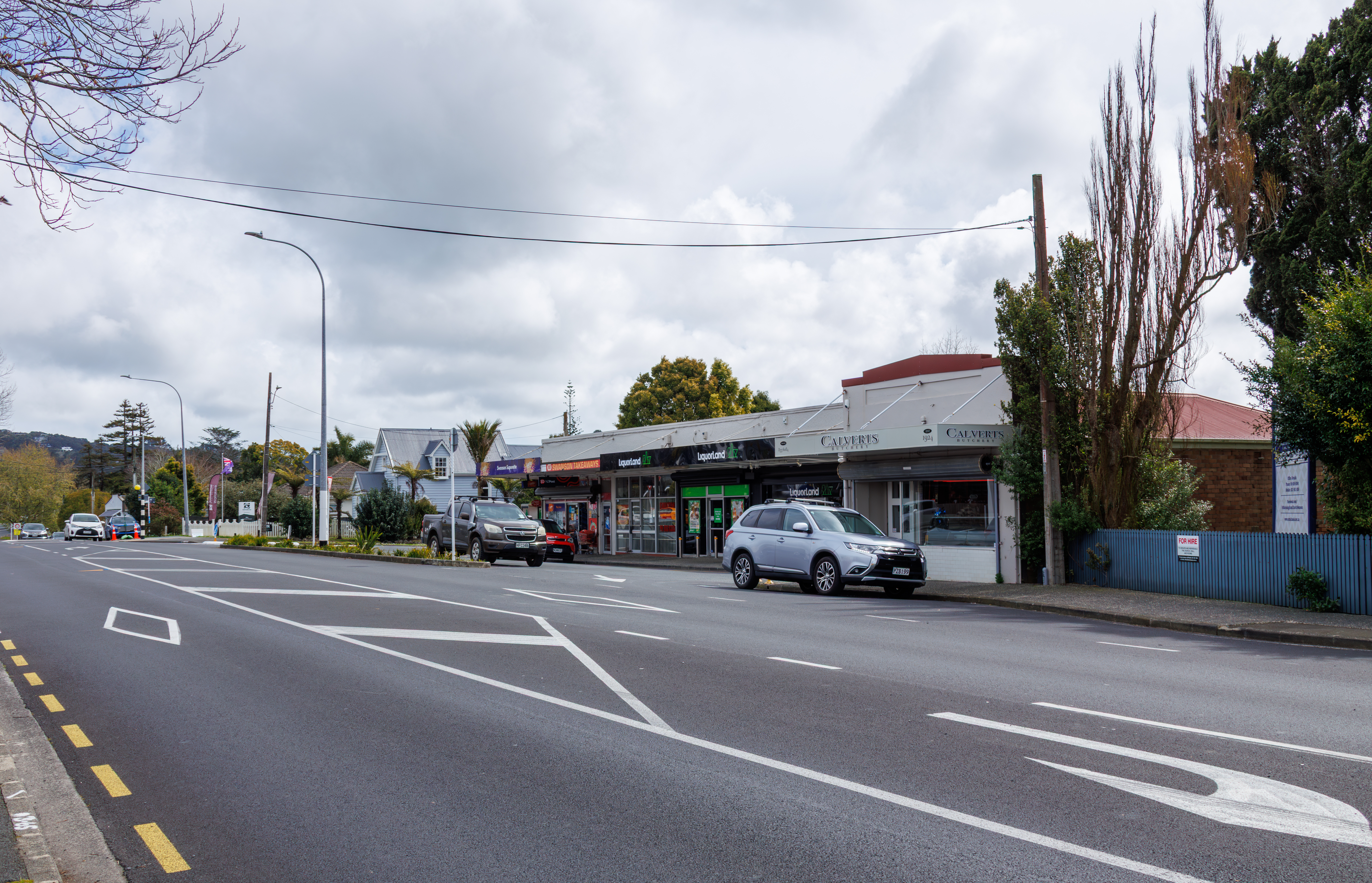
- The town centre of Swanson
- Interactive map of Swanson
- Country: New Zealand
- City: Auckland
- Local authority: Auckland Council
- Electoral ward: Waitākere ward
- Local board: Waitākere Ranges Local Board; Henderson-Massey Local Board

Area
  - Land: 209 ha (520 acres)

Population (June 2025)
  - Total: 4,190
  - Density: 2,000/km^{2} (5,190/sq mi)
- Train stations: Swanson railway station

Waitākere	Taupaki	Massey
(Waitākere Ranges)	Swanson	Rānui
(Waitākere Ranges)	Henderson Valley	Sunnyvale

Swanson (Māori: Waiwhauwhaupaku) is an outlying suburb of West Auckland, New Zealand and is located west of Henderson, surrounded by the Waitākere Ranges. Developing as a service centre for the kauri logging and gumdigging trades in the 1880s along the trainline, the town developed as a rural centre and an early tourist destination for Aucklanders, who visited the Redwood Park on the banks of the Swanson Stream. In the 1940s, the park became a training centre for soldiers in World War II, and in 1970 hosted Redwood 70, the first modern music festival in New Zealand.

== Geography ==
The Swanson area is primarily a valley north-east of the Waitākere Ranges, and a major catchment area for the Swanson Stream. Prior to human settlement, the Swanson area formed a part of the warm lowlands ecosystem common in inland West Auckland, dominated by kauri, rimu, rātā, kahikatea and rewarewa. The areas adjacent to the Swanson Stream were an alluvial flood zone, favoured by kahikatea and tōtara trees.

== History ==
=== Early history ===
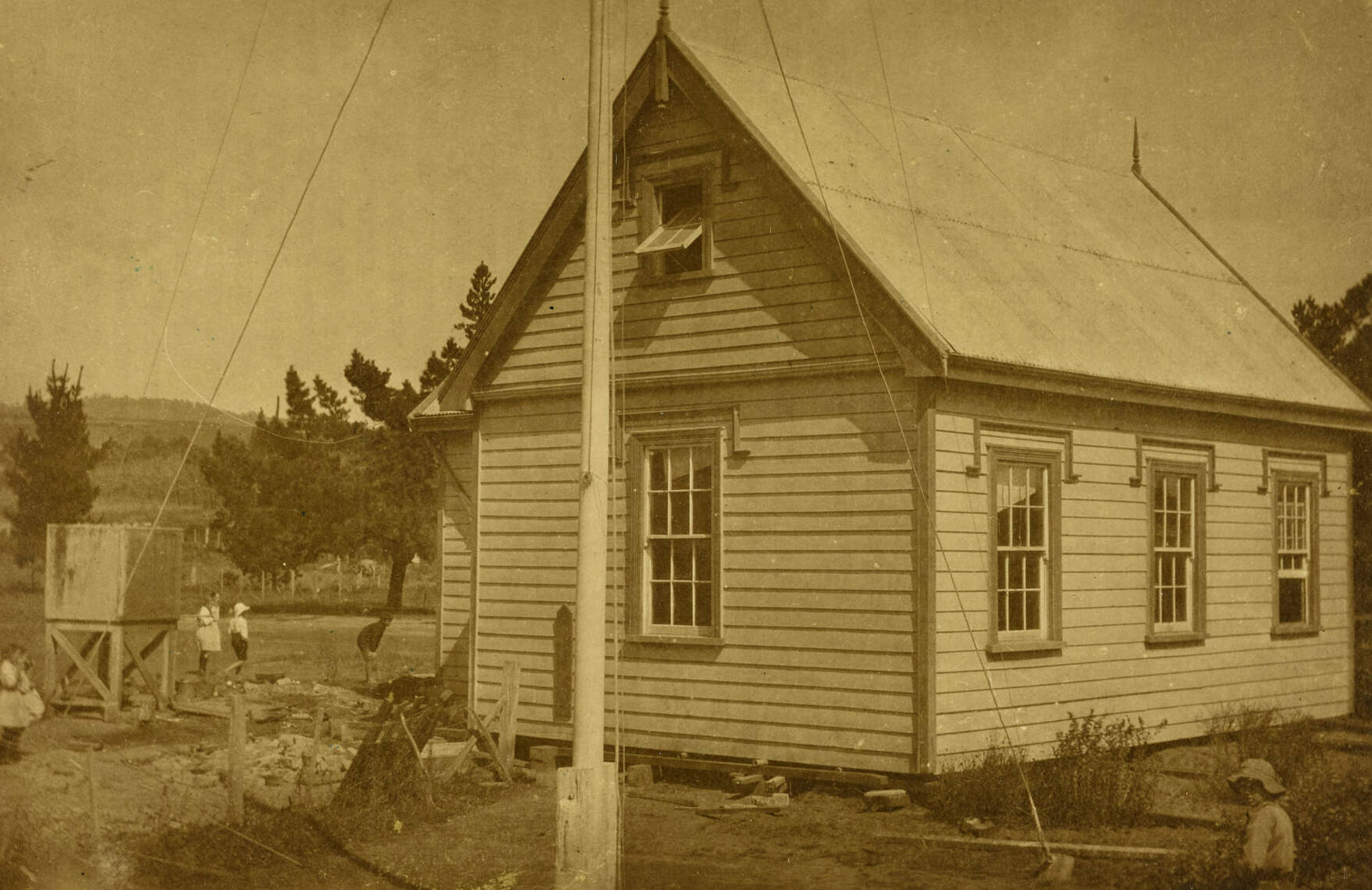
The Swanson School, which opened in 1888, was an early centre for the Swanson village community

The Swanson area is in the rohe of Te Kawerau ā Maki, a Tāmaki Māori iwi who traditionally settled in the West Auckland and Waitākere Ranges area. A defensive pā was found in the hills above Swanson called Pukearuhe ("Bracken Fern Hill"), and the Swanson area formed part of the walking track between Te Henga / Bethells Beach and Wai Huruhuru Manawa (Huruhuru Creek) tidal inlet, the south-western section of the Te Wai-o-Pareira / Henderson Creek. The Swanson Stream valley was traditionally known as Waiwhauwhaupaku, a name which refers to the Pseudopanax arboreus (five-finger tree) which grew profusely in the densely forested area, while southern Swanson was known by the name Waimoko, which refers to the skinks and geckos that were found there. Te Kawerau ā Maki suffered hardships in the late 18th and early 19th centuries, due to influenza and the Musket Wars of the 1820s. When the iwi returned to their traditional lands in the 1830s, life was focused at Te Henga / Bethells Beach. Much of West Auckland near was sold to European purchasers in the 1850s, without the knowledge or consent of the senior rangatira of Te Kawerau ā Maki.

Pioneer William Swanson settled in the area in 1852, logging kauri trees along the Swanson Stream and other waterways. By the 1870s, he was a strong critic of kauri logging practices. The township of Swanson was established in the mid-1880s, with many of the first residents receiving land cheaply through government settlement regimes intended to develop the area. In 1881, the Swanson railway station opened, connecting the area to the city of Auckland. The railway station became a busy depot for the kauri logging trade of the northern Waitākere Ranges, and the town developed as a service centre for people involved in the logging and kauri gum digging trades. Many early residents in the area established farms and orchards, supplementing their income with kauri gum digging. In the late 19th century, Croatian New Zealand immigrants (then commonly known as Dalmatian) worked land at Swanson, with kauri gum digging operations which were more intensive and systematic than previous efforts.

The Swanson School opened on 18 June 1888 to serve the community. Prior to this, schoolchildren needed to travel to Woodhill. The school was the centre of the community during the late 19th century, and was a place where religious services, concerts and meetings were held.

=== Tourist destination, the Waitākere Dam and training camp ===
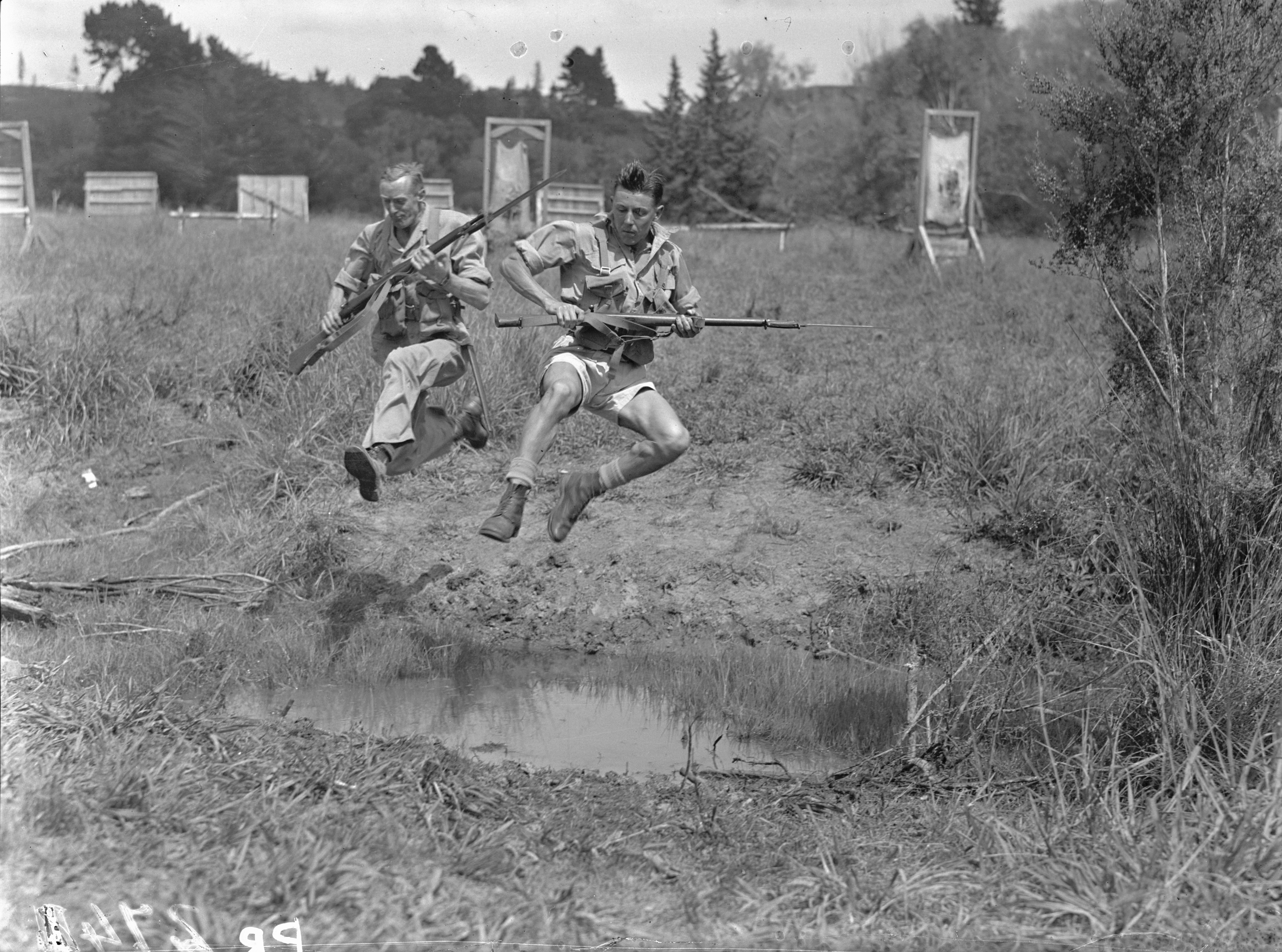
Royal New Zealand Air Force servicemen undergoing bush warfare training at the RNZAF Weapons Training School in Swanson

Swanson became a popular destination for picnickers and daytrippers from Auckland from the late 1880s, to visit the Waitākere Falls and the Redwood Park on the banks of the Swanson River. Due to track damage, later tourists preferred to visit the Waitākere Falls via Henderson, and in 1905, a decision was made to construct the Waitākere Dam at the location of the falls, to ensure better drinking water for the city of Auckland. Swanson township was a major source of labour for the project, and by 1907 a tramline had been constructed between the dam site and the Swanson railway station. Work on the dam was completed in 1910, and in the 1920s a filtration plant was constructed at Swanson.

Redwood Park became a popular destination for picnickers in the 1890s and 1900s. On New Years Day 1900, three different groups organised picnics at the park, resulting in between 1,500 and 2,000 picnickers visiting Swanson that day. The park was bought by Arney Robertson in 1921, who called it the Swanson Park and Recreation Ground. In 1934, the park gained the name Redwood Park when 3,000 redwood trees were planted here (many of which died in a cyclone in 1937). An RSA picnic in 1936 brought a crowd of 7,500 people.

The town further developed in the late 1910s and 1920s when the New Zealand Government balloted and divided kauri gum reverse land. Many of the new settlers were servicemen who had returned after World War I. By the 1920s, sheep and cattle farming had become more common in the area, and after the Swanson School moved locations, the town was no longer centred around the railway station. On 23 May 1929, the Swanson town hall was built, which held community events such as Saturday night dances and film screenings. On 10 June 1939, Scenic Drive was opened between Waiatarua and Swanson in the eastern Waitākere Ranges. This also made access to Pukematekeo much easier, a hill known as tourist attraction due to its views over Auckland.

In early 1940, Redwood Park was acquisitioned by the New Zealand Army as a training camp for soldiers during World War II. This was later taken over by the Royal New Zealand Air Force, who used the park as a bush warfare training facility. The army camp became a strong focus for the Swanson community during the war, during which the camp held regular dances and balls. The camp was vacated in August 1945, after which it became one of the largest inland motorcamps in New Zealand.

Local winemaker Milan Babić Yozin, who had established extensive orchards in Swanson in the 1930s, began growing wine in Swanson in 1942.

=== Suburban development ===
The population of Swanson grew significantly between the 1920s and 1980s, from 500 to almost 2,000 residents. In 1970, Swanson's Redwood Park became the location of Redwood 70, billed as New Zealand's first music festival, headlined by Robin Gibb of the Bee Gees. Held over two days and drawing over 9,000 attendees, the concert was mired by rowdy crowds, and was unable to make promoter Phil Warren a profit. In the following year, the Redwood Park was sold and redeveloped as a golf course and country club.

In 1984, the Waitemata City opened a balefill landfill north of Swanson, causing the town's residents to have issues with wind-blown refuse and methane. Five years later, the Waitakere City council proposed that the landfill, have its life extended by 50 years, leading to a widespread protest movement in Swanson, seeing the formation of the Swanson Balefill Action Group. The group succeeded in lobbying the council, and the Kay Road Balefill was officially closed in November 1996.

Crystal Mountain Mine Museum, a specialist museum, has operated in Swanson since 2000.

== Demographics ==
Swanson covers 2.09 km^{2} (0.81 sq mi) and had an estimated population of 4,190 as of June 2025, with a population density of 2,005 people per km^{2}.

Historical population
Year	Pop.	±% p.a.
2006	1,386	—
2013	1,653	+2.55%
2018	2,241	+6.28%
2023	3,696	+10.52%
The 2006 population is for a smaller area of 1.89 km^{2}. Source:

Swanson had a population of 3,696 in the 2023 New Zealand census, an increase of 1,455 people (64.9%) since the 2018 census, and an increase of 2,043 people (123.6%) since the 2013 census. There were 1,854 males, 1,836 females and 9 people of other genders in 1,116 dwellings. 3.5% of people identified as LGBTIQ+. The median age was 33.3 years (compared with 38.1 years nationally). There were 810 people (21.9%) aged under 15 years, 783 (21.2%) aged 15 to 29, 1,839 (49.8%) aged 30 to 64, and 264 (7.1%) aged 65 or older.

People could identify as more than one ethnicity. The results were 48.5% European (Pākehā); 15.4% Māori; 14.1% Pasifika; 34.6% Asian; 3.7% Middle Eastern, Latin American and African New Zealanders (MELAA); and 3.1% other, which includes people giving their ethnicity as "New Zealander". English was spoken by 92.6%, Māori language by 3.2%, Samoan by 3.6%, and other languages by 28.8%. No language could be spoken by 3.7% (e.g. too young to talk). New Zealand Sign Language was known by 0.2%. The percentage of people born overseas was 40.9, compared with 28.8% nationally.

Religious affiliations were 33.4% Christian, 7.5% Hindu, 4.0% Islam, 0.5% Māori religious beliefs, 2.1% Buddhist, 0.4% New Age, 0.1% Jewish, and 2.4% other religions. People who answered that they had no religion were 43.8%, and 5.9% of people did not answer the census question.

Of those at least 15 years old, 732 (25.4%) people had a bachelor's or higher degree, 1,314 (45.5%) had a post-high school certificate or diploma, and 630 (21.8%) people exclusively held high school qualifications. The median income was $54,400, compared with $41,500 nationally. 474 people (16.4%) earned over $100,000 compared to 12.1% nationally. The employment status of those at least 15 was that 1,752 (60.7%) people were employed full-time, 315 (10.9%) were part-time, and 105 (3.6%) were unemployed.

=== Rural ===
The area to the south and west of Swanson, comprising the statistical area of Swanson Rural, covers 15.15 km^{2} (5.85 sq mi) and had an estimated population of 2,350 as of June 2025, with a population density of 155 people per km^{2}.

Historical population for Swanson Rural
Year	Pop.	±% p.a.
2006	2,037	—
2013	2,130	+0.64%
2018	2,355	+2.03%
2023	2,289	−0.57%

Swanson Rural had a population of 2,289 in the 2023 New Zealand census, a decrease of 66 people (−2.8%) since the 2018 census, and an increase of 159 people (7.5%) since the 2013 census. There were 1,152 males, 1,125 females and 9 people of other genders in 741 dwellings. 4.3% of people identified as LGBTIQ+. The median age was 42.5 years (compared with 38.1 years nationally). There were 387 people (16.9%) aged under 15 years, 414 (18.1%) aged 15 to 29, 1,134 (49.5%) aged 30 to 64, and 357 (15.6%) aged 65 or older.

People could identify as more than one ethnicity. The results were 86.0% European (Pākehā); 16.3% Māori; 6.3% Pasifika; 8.8% Asian; 1.6% Middle Eastern, Latin American and African New Zealanders (MELAA); and 2.5% other, which includes people giving their ethnicity as "New Zealander". English was spoken by 96.5%, Māori language by 2.6%, Samoan by 0.8%, and other languages by 12.6%. No language could be spoken by 1.8% (e.g. too young to talk). New Zealand Sign Language was known by 0.5%. The percentage of people born overseas was 24.4, compared with 28.8% nationally.

Religious affiliations were 24.6% Christian, 1.0% Hindu, 0.8% Māori religious beliefs, 0.5% Buddhist, 0.9% New Age, 0.1% Jewish, and 1.7% other religions. People who answered that they had no religion were 63.3%, and 6.8% of people did not answer the census question.

Of those at least 15 years old, 360 (18.9%) people had a bachelor's or higher degree, 1,038 (54.6%) had a post-high school certificate or diploma, and 381 (20.0%) people exclusively held high school qualifications. The median income was $49,300, compared with $41,500 nationally. 318 people (16.7%) earned over $100,000 compared to 12.1% nationally. The employment status of those at least 15 was that 1,014 (53.3%) people were employed full-time, 306 (16.1%) were part-time, and 48 (2.5%) were unemployed.

== Transport ==
Swanson railway station is situated on the North Auckland Line. The station is the terminus for East West Line suburban passenger services. It is the westernmost and northernmost point of the electrified rail network.

== Local government ==
From 1876 until 1974, Swanson was administered by the Waitemata County, a large rural county north and west of the city of Auckland. In 1974, Swanson became a part of the Waitemata City, an area which covered most of West Auckland, excluding the boroughs of Henderson, Glen Eden and New Lynn. With the 1989 local government reforms, the Waitemata City merged with these boroughs to form Waitakere City, and in November 2010, all cities and districts of the Auckland Region were amalgamated into a single body, governed by the Auckland Council.

Swanson is primarily in the Waitākere Ranges local board area, except the eastern-most areas near Rānui, which form a part of the Henderson-Massey local board area. Each area elects a local board, and the residents of the Waitākere Ranges and Henderson-Massey elect two councillors from the Waitākere ward to sit on the Auckland Council.

== Bibliography ==
- Adam, Jack; Burgess, Vivien; Ellis, Dawn (2004). Rugged Determination: Historical Window on Swanson 1854-2004. Swanson Residents and Ratepayers Association Inc. ISBN 0-476-00544-2.
- Reidy, Jade (2009). "How the West Was Run". In Macdonald, Finlay; Kerr, Ruth (eds.). West: The History of Waitakere. Random House. pp. 237–256. ISBN 9781869790080.
- Taua, Te Warena (2009). "He Kohikohinga Kōrero mō Hikurangi". In Macdonald, Finlay; Kerr, Ruth (eds.). West: The History of Waitakere. Random House. pp. 23–48. ISBN 9781869790080.
