= Arthur Withy =

New Zealand journalist and political activist

Arthur Withy (February 1870 – 24 September 1943) was a New Zealand journalist and political activist.

== Political activity ==
Born in Seaton Carew in England in 1870, Withy arrived in New Zealand in 1884. He was a journalist and prominent single-taxer (i.e. a land tax) and follower of Henry George. He was Secretary of the New Zealand Land Values League.

Arthur Withy was a Liberal Party (UK) candidate for South Herefordshire in the United Kingdom in 1895 and a candidate for the New Zealand Liberal Party for the Parnell electorate in 1896. He was a member of the United Labour Party National Executive 1912-13 and an independent Labour candidate for Auckland East in 1911.

Arthur Withy died on 24 September 1943.

Withy's father Edward Withy had been a shipbuilder in Bristol, England until he emigrated to New Zealand in 1884. He represented Newton in the New Zealand Parliament from 1887 to 1890.
