= 1940 Auckland West by-election =

New Zealand by-election

- 18 May 1940
- Turnout: 8,136 (60.03%)
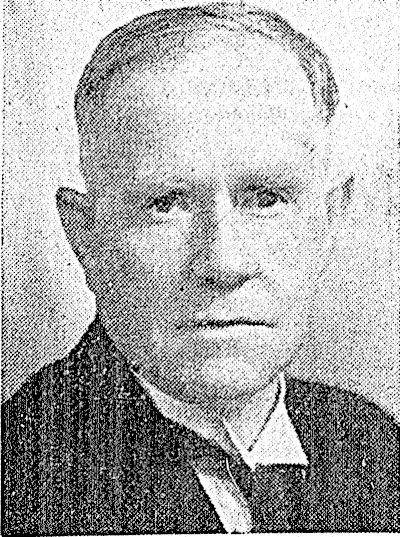

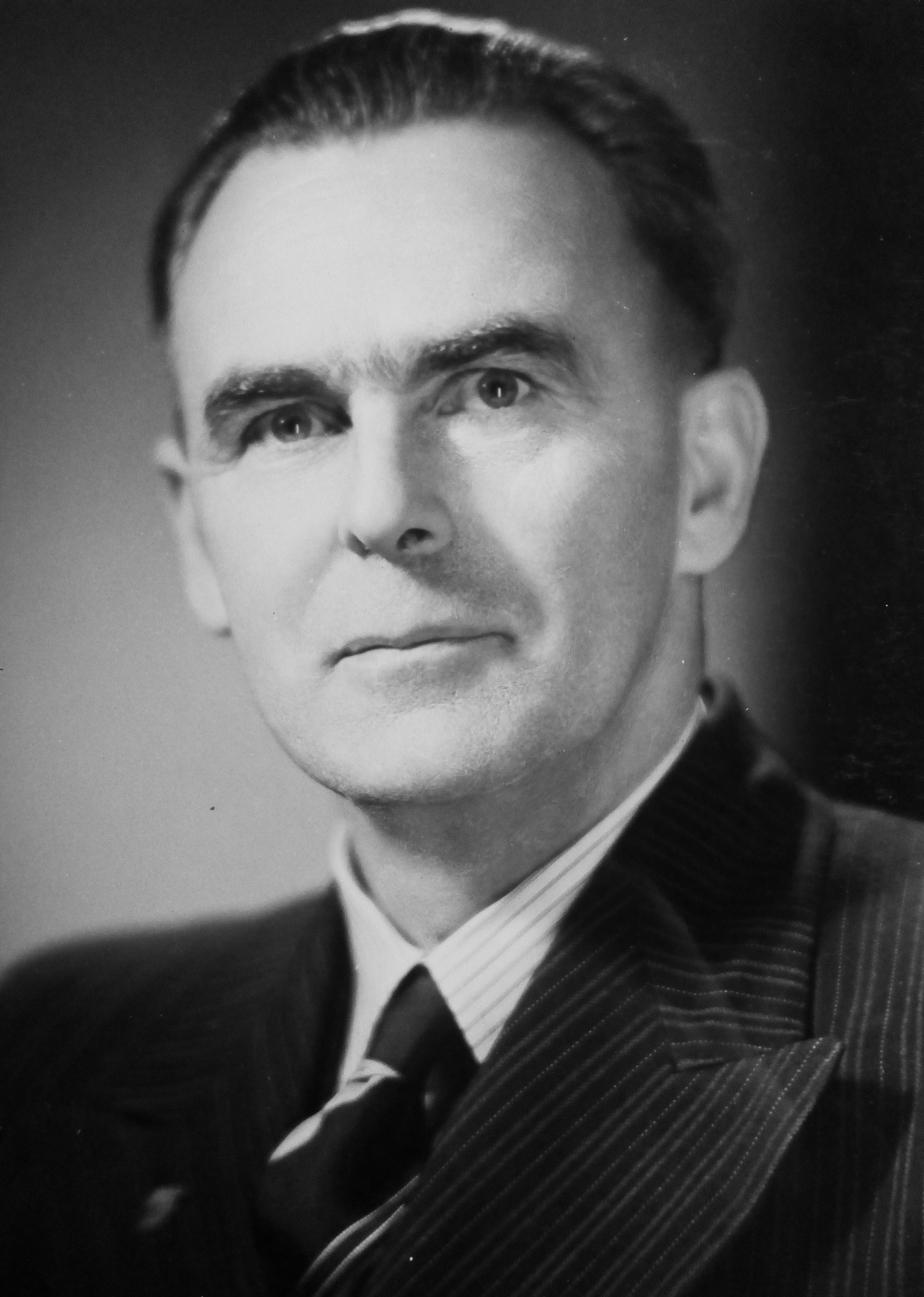
Candidate	Peter Carr	Wilfred Fortune
Party	Labour	Independent
Popular vote	6,151	2,958
Percentage	63.24	30.41
MP before election
Michael Joseph Savage
Labour
Elected MP
Peter Carr
Labour

The Auckland West by-election of 1940 was a by-election for the electorate of Auckland West held on 18 May 1940 during the 26th New Zealand Parliament. The by-election resulted from the death on 27 March 1940 of the previous member Michael Joseph Savage, the revered prime minister whose terminal illness had not been made public.

== Background ==
The by-election was won by Peter Carr; also of the Labour Party. The other aspirants for the Labour nomination were Charles Bailey, Mary Dreaver, L. W. Holt, N. E. Herring, John Thomas Jennings, Thomas Percival McCready, Winnifred Moore, Joe Sayegh, John Stewart and Jeremiah James Sullivan.

Because of the war, the National Party did not nominate a candidate, and four of the five candidates who stood against the Labour candidate lost their deposit. The freshly forged Democratic Labour Party (DLP) by expelled Labour rebel John A. Lee also abstained from contesting. Lee's chief lieutenant Norman Douglas was approached by the DLP to contest the by-election in an effort to boost the new party's publicity, but Douglas declined to stand.

== Results ==
The following table gives the election results:

1940 Auckland West by-election
Party	Candidate	Votes	%	±%
Labour	Peter Carr	6,151	63.24	
Independent	Wilfred Fortune	2,958	30.41	
Communist	Gordon Watson	375	3.86	
Ind. Socialist	Lawrence Pickles	132	1.36	
Liberal	Joseph Kennedy	15	0.15	
Independent	Enoch Naden	8	0.08	
Informal votes		68	0.70	+0.05
Majority		3,193	32.83	
Turnout		8,136	60.03	−29.73
Registered electors		16,170		
Labour hold		Swing		

Four of the six candidates lost their deposits.

In 1946, Carr also died in office. Wilfred Fortune, who stood as an independent, subsequently became a National candidate (1943) and MP (1946) for the Eden electorate.
