= Swanson Stream =

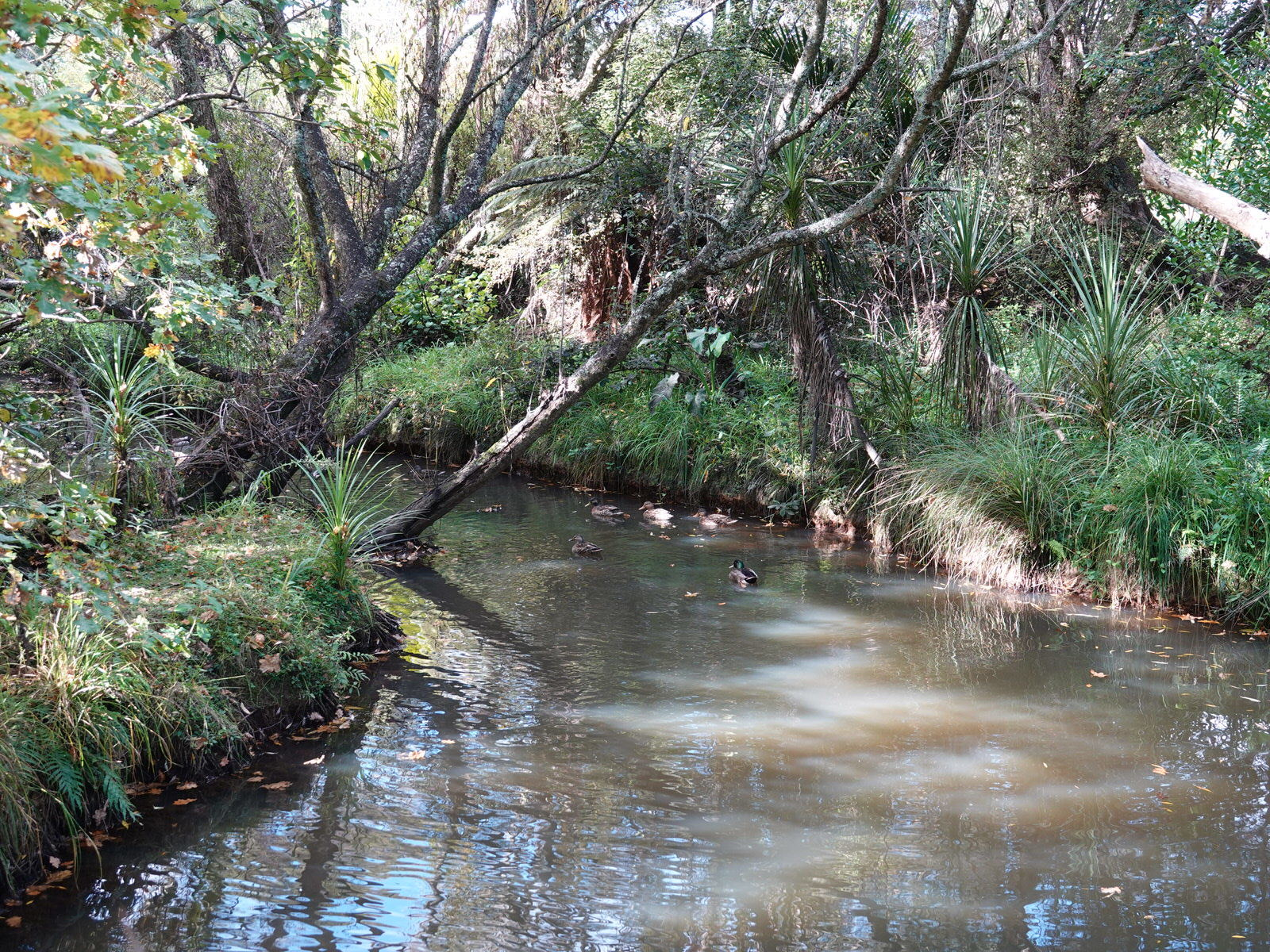
- The Swanson Stream near the Redwood Park Golf Club

- Mouth of Swanson Stream Swanson Stream (New Zealand)
- Route of the Swanson Stream

Location
- Country: New Zealand
- Region: Auckland Region

Physical characteristics
- Source: Waitākere Ranges
- Mouth: Huruhuru Creek
  - coordinates: 36.865°S 174.570°E
- Length: 8 km (5 mi)

Basin features
- Progression: Swanson Stream → Huruhuru Creek → Te Wai-o-Pareira / Henderson Creek → Waitematā Harbour
- River system: Te Wai-o-Pareira / Henderson Creek

The Swanson Stream is a stream of the Auckland Region of New Zealand's North Island. It flows north-east from its source the Waitākere Ranges through rural West Auckland towards the suburb of Swanson, into the Huruhuru Creek which exits into Te Wai-o-Pareira / Henderson Creek and the western the Waitematā Harbour. Since the mid-2000s, the stream has been forested with native flora.

== Geography ==
The stream begins in the Waitākere Ranges north-east of the catchment of the Waitākere Reservoir, at Pukematekeo. It flows north-east to the outer Auckland suburb of Swanson. The Swanson Stream enters into the Huruhuru Creek, which flows into Te Wai-o-Pareira / Henderson Creek and the western Waitematā Harbour. The river has a number of major tributaries, including the Momutu Stream at Te Rangi Hiroa Reserve, at the division between the suburbs of Rānui and Massey, the Waiomoko Stream and the Billy Joe Stream.

The stream is a habitat for the New Zealand longfin eel, the short-finned eel, cran's bully, common bully (toitoi), redfin bully, New Zealand smelt, banded kōkopu, common galaxias (īnanga) and torrentfish (panoko). The land adjacent to the stream form an alluvial flood zone, which was historically forested by tōtara, tītoki and west coast kōwhai.

== History ==
The stream is in the rohe of Te Kawerau ā Maki, and was traditionally known as Waiwhauwhaupaku, a name which refers to the Pseudopanax arboreus (five-finger tree) which profusely grew in densely forested the area. The stream was important to Te Kawerau ā Maki, who harvested the resources of the stream, including eels and harakeke flax that was harvested for use as textiles. The stream's valley was an important walking track, linking Wai Huruhuru Manawa (the south-western arm of Te Wai-o-Pareira / Henderson Creek) to Pukearuhe, the pā above Swanson, and Waitākere River vallery settlements along the northern Pukewhakataratara ridge, such as Te Henga / Bethells Beach.

The river is named after William Swanson, who immigrated to New Zealand and settled in the area in 1852 to log kauri. The Swanson Stream was one of the earliest waterways dammed for kauri logging in West Auckland. By the 1870s, William Swanson was a strong critic of kauri logging practices.

Between the mid-2000s and the 2020s, large-scale riparian planting was undertaken along the Swanson Stream as a part of Project Twin Streams.

== See also ==
- List of rivers of New Zealand
