= David Goldie (politician) =

New Zealand politician

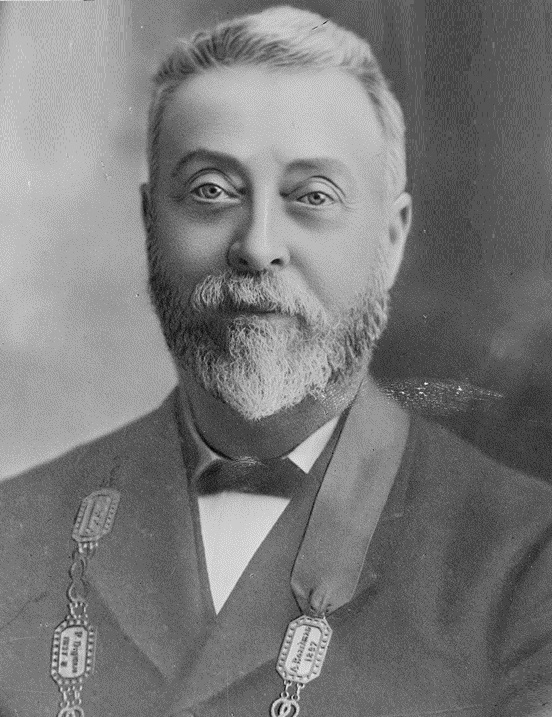

16th Mayor of Auckland City
- In office 21 December 1898 – 8 May 1901
- Preceded by: Peter Dignan
- Succeeded by: John Logan Campbell

Personal details
- Born: 1842 Hobart, Tasmania, Australia
- Died: 8 June 1926 Auckland, New Zealand
- Party: Liberal
- Relations: C. F. Goldie (son)

David Goldie (1842 – 8 June 1926) was the mayor of Auckland City from 1898 to 1901 and a member of Parliament in New Zealand. The artist C. F. Goldie was his son.

== Biography ==
=== Early life ===
Born in Hobart, Tasmania, in 1842, Goldie emigrated to New Zealand in 1863.

He was a prominent timber merchant, a strict Primitive Methodist, and one-time Grand Master of the New Zealand Grand Orange Lodge.

He was the father of artist C. F. Goldie.

=== Political career ===
New Zealand Parliament
Years	Term	Electorate	Party
1879	6th	Auckland West	Independent
1887–1890	10th	Auckland West	Independent
1890–1891	11th	Newton	Liberal

On 27 November 1873, Goldie was elected to the Auckland Provincial Council for the Auckland West electorate. He remained a councillor until the abolition of provincial government at the end of 1876.

Goldie contested the Auckland West electorate in a by-election on 4 March 1879. The by-election was caused by the resignation of Patrick Dignan, who also stood in this contest. Dignan and Goldie received 261 and 776 votes, respectively, and with a majority of 515 votes, Goldie was declared elected. He served until the dissolution of parliament on 15 August of that year.

Goldie represented the Auckland West electorate again from 1887 to 1890. He then represented the Newton electorate from 1890 to 1891 as a Liberal MP, when he resigned.

In December 1898, Goldie was elected mayor of Auckland. He was returned without opposition to this role in 1899 and 1900. He retired as mayor prior to the municipal elections in April 1901 rather than toast the visiting Duke and Duchess of Cornwall and York with alcohol later that year. He was replaced as mayor for the jubilee year by the Father of Auckland, Sir John Logan Campbell.

=== Death ===
He died at his home in Auckland on 8 June 1926 and was buried at Purewa Cemetery.

== Notes ==
New Zealand Parliament
Preceded by Edward Withy	Member of Parliament for Newton; 1890–1891	Succeeded by George Grey
Political offices
Preceded by Peter Dignan	Mayor of Auckland City; 1898–1901	Succeeded by John Logan Campbell
