= Peter Dignan (mayor) =

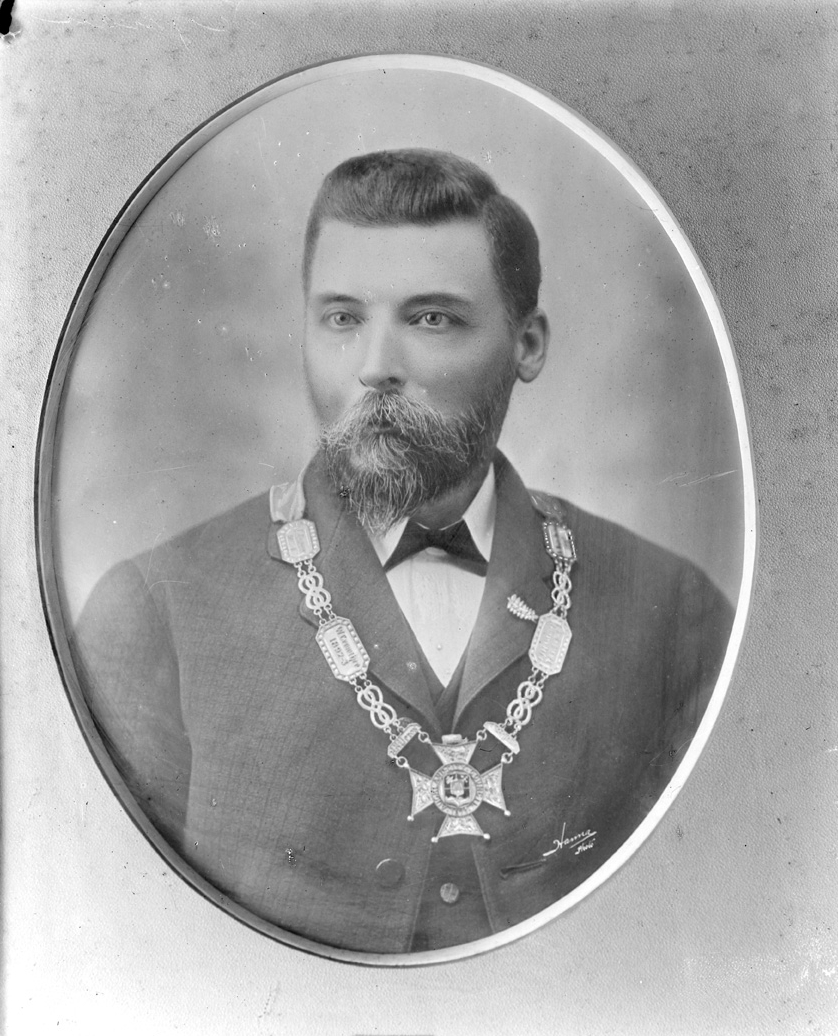
Peter Dignan with mayoral chains

Peter Dignan (24 April 1847 – 15 June 1922) was the fifteenth Mayor of Auckland who held the office in 1897 and 1898. He was the first New Zealand-born and probably the first Catholic occupant of the position.

== Early life ==
Dignan was born in Auckland. He was the eldest son of Patrick Dignan M.L.C. and was educated at St Peter's School by the noted teacher Richard O'Sullivan. Patrick Dignan was one of the Board of Governors of St Peter's School.

== Career ==
Dignan was admitted as a Barrister and Solicitor in 1868. He went into partnership with later politician John Sheehan to form the legal firm of Sheehan and Dignan which later, when Sheehan left the partnership, became Dignan and Armstrong.

== Religious and social concern ==
Dignan was involved in Sunday school and other activities connected with St Patrick's Cathedral, Auckland and other Catholic initiatives. He was a member of the Catholic Young Men's Literary and Debating Society which was the nursery of several political careers including those of John Sheehan and another young lawyer, Joseph Tole. Dignan was an officer in the volunteer armed forces and for 22 years he was a trustee and sometime President of the Auckland Working Men's Club. He also gave his services to many other community endeavours, including the Auckland Harbour Board and the Auckland University College.

== Local government ==
Dignan was a member of the Auckland City Council for 12 years. In 1897, in his first term as Mayor, the statue of Queen Victoria was erected in Albert Park to mark her 60 years as Queen. In 1898, during his second term as Mayor, the Auckland Exhibition was held. As Mayor, Dignan attempted to increase the rating revenue of the Auckland City Council by promoting a Bill which would have restored to the Council the rating powers possessed by all other boroughs. In anticipation of the measure being passed, it was decided to ascertain the opinion of the ratepayers. The ratepayers were not persuaded and at the poll they disapproved the suggested increase (9d in the £) by 1,594 votes to 1,052. The Bill was withdrawn. Dignan's successor, David Goldie, instead, had to institute rigorous economies in council administration with aged and ageing officials being pensioned off.

Dignan died on 15 June 1922.

Political offices
Preceded by Abraham Boardman	Mayor of Auckland City; 1897–1898	Succeeded by David Goldie
