= Robert James Creighton =

New Zealand politician

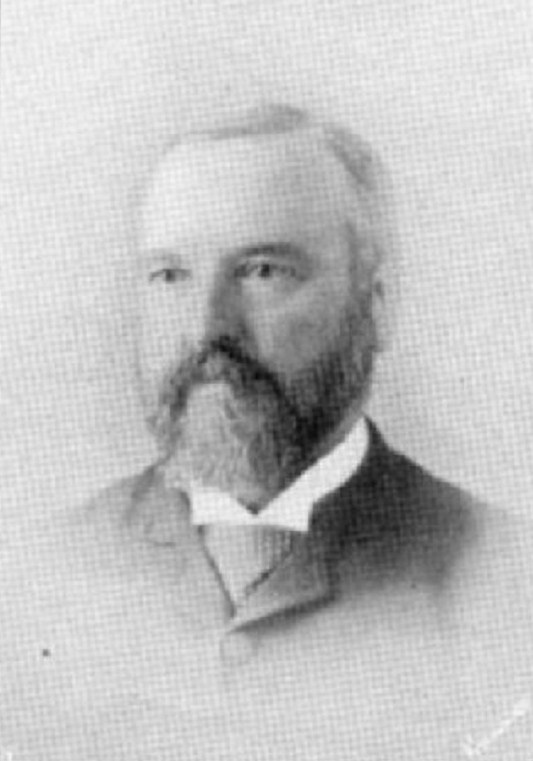

Robert James Creighton (1835 – 22 May 1893) was a 19th-century member of parliament in the Auckland Region, New Zealand.

== Early life and newspaper career ==
Creighton was born in Derry, Ireland, in 1835. He was an apprentice compositor with the Londonderry Sentinel, before becoming a reporter and then member of the editorial staff of that newspaper. In the early 1860s he emigrated to New Zealand, and in 1862 became the co-owner of The Southern Cross newspaper in Auckland. Following that newspaper's purchase by Julius Vogel in 1868, Creighton established the short-lived Free Press. He later served as editor of the New Zealand Times and the New Zealand Herald.

He was briefly a resident of Hawaii, where he was editor of the Pacific Commercial Advertiser in 1886, and also Minister of Foreign Affairs to King Kalākaua.

== Political career ==
New Zealand Parliament
Years	Term	Electorate	Party
1865–1866	3rd	Parnell	Independent
1869–1870	4th	Newton	Independent
1871–1875	5th	Eden	Independent

Creighton represented the Parnell electorate from 1865 to 1866, when he retired. He then represented the Newton electorate from 1869 to 1870, when he retired. He then represented the Eden electorate from 1871 to 1875, when he retired.

== Later life ==
Creighton moved to San Francisco, where he was agent for the Government of New Zealand. During a short residence at Honolulu, he became a member of the Government of Hawaii. He died suddenly at San Francisco, leaving a widow, a son, and a daughter.

His son Charles F. Creighton was the Attornery General for the Kingdom of Hawaii.

New Zealand Parliament
Preceded by Reader Wood	Member of Parliament for Parnell; 1865–1866	Succeeded by Frederick Whitaker
Preceded by George Graham	Member of Parliament for Newton; 1869–1870	Succeeded by William Swanson
New constituency	Member of Parliament for Eden; 1871–1876	Succeeded by Joseph Tole
Government offices
Preceded by Walter M. Gibson	Kingdom of Hawaii Minister of Foreign Affairs; 1886	Succeeded by Walter M. Gibson
