= James Wallis (New Zealand politician) =

New Zealand politician

New Zealand Parliament
| Years | Term | Electorate | Party |
|---|---|---|---|
| 1877–1879 | 6th | Auckland West | Independent |
| 1879–1881 | 7th | Auckland West | Independent |

James Wallis (1825 – 25 May 1912) was a 19th-century Member of Parliament from Auckland, New Zealand.

Wallis was born in Aberdeenshire in 1825. He received his education at the University of Aberdeen, from where he graduated with a Master of Arts in 1844. He was a minister of the Presbyterian Church, and ministered in Scotland at Dundee and Aberdeen, and in British Guiana in Essequibo and Demerara. He went back for further study to become a medical missionary, and in 1863 was admitted as a member to the Royal College of Surgeons of Edinburgh. He travelled to New Zealand in 1865 via Africa and Australia.

In 1862, Wallis married Elizabeth Poole; she was the daughter of a physician, Richard Poole, from Edinburgh.

Wallis represented the Auckland West electorate from an 1877 by-election to 1881, when he was defeated. He contested the 1890 election in the City of Auckland electorate. Of seven candidates, he came second to last. Wallis was a strong supporter of women's suffrage.

His wife died many years before him. A resident of Grey Lynn, he died on 25 May 1912. He was buried beside his wife at Waikumete Cemetery.
