= New Zealand Liberal Party (1938) =

- Chairman: William Frederick Jamieson
- Founded: c. 1938
- Dissolved: late 1940s
- Ideology: Liberalism; Anti-Socialism
- Political position: Centre to Centre-right

The New Zealand Liberal Party was a liberal party that was formed to stand candidates in the 1938 general election to oppose the then Labour Party government.

== History ==
After the coalition government between the United and Reform parties was defeated by the Labour Party at the 1935 general election many of Labour's political opponents argued for drastic reorganisation in order to defeat Labour. There were competing theories on the best way to go about this. One was to attempt a revival of the old New Zealand Liberal Party, which dominated politics in New Zealand from the 1890s to the 1910s, from the remnants of United and Reform. A new leader was also desired with the group having lost faith with the coalition government leaders George Forbes and Gordon Coates.

The Liberal Party was subsequently created and organised to stand candidates at the 1938 general election. Branches were formed in Auckland, Wellington, Christchurch and Dunedin, Its policy platform was stated to be moderate and in-between the Labour Party and the National Party platforms. One of the leading figures in the party was William Frederick Jamieson, who had stood as an Independent Liberal in 1935 in the Roskill electorate. However, in a surprise move, the party executive decided in early October 1938 to suspend its campaign so as not to split the National Party's vote, thinking it the best chance of defeating Labour. The executive stressed that the party would continue and that a party rally would be held in early 1939. It subsequently intended to stand candidates at the scheduled (but later cancelled) 1941 general election.

The party fielded a candidate for the first time at the 1940 Auckland West by-election, one of the party's nation-wide organisers Joseph Bond Kennedy. Kennedy later withdrew in the interest of national unity in wartime. However, by the time of his withdrawal it was legally impossible to remove his name from ballot papers. Despite retiring from the election 15 votes were still cast for Kennedy. The party thought that the National Party, and particularly its leader Adam Hamilton, were not effective enough in combating socialism. In the 1940s Hamilton's replacement as National leader Sidney Holland worked to extinguish many small anti-labour groups such as the Liberal Party, with many of its organisers being brought in to the National Party.

During the period of World War II the party organisation was largely moribund, but after the war attempted to re-establish itself. Kennedy attempted to build a centennial memorial to Liberal Prime Minister Richard Seddon and to use it as a catalyst to revive liberalism in New Zealand. He sought support from the liberal parties in Australia, Britain, Canada and South Africa as well as from Tom Seddon (Seddon's son and a former Liberal MP). By 1948 the party was reorganising and branches had been reestablished with the intent to contest the 1949 general election.
