= Newton (New Zealand electorate) =

Newton was a 19th-century parliamentary electorate in Auckland, New Zealand. It existed from 1861 to 1893 and was represented by seven Members of Parliament.

== History ==
Newton existed from 1861 to 1893. It was created for the 3rd New Zealand Parliament and ran to the end of the 11th Parliament, and was represented by seven MPs.

George Graham was the first representative, who was elected on 15 January 1861. He was re-elected in the 1866 election, but resigned in 1869. The resulting 1869 by-election was won by Robert James Creighton. In the subsequent 1871 election, Creighton successfully contested the Eden electorate. The Newton electorate was won by William Swanson in 1871, who was re-elected in the next general election on 24 December 1875, and in the 1879 and 1881 elections. Swanson retired in 1884.

Swanson was succeeded by Thomas Peacock in the 1884 election. In the 1887 election, Peacock successfully contested the Ponsonby electorate.

The 1887 election was contested by Joseph Tole (who had represented the Eden electorate since the 1876 election and was the Minister of Justice), Edward Withy (a political novice who, after early retirement from business, had emigrated with his large family to Auckland in 1884) and Henry Thomas Garrett. Tole and Garrett were liberal politicians, whilst Withy was a conservative. The liberal vote was split, and Tole, Withy and Garrett received 606, 701 and 170 votes, respectively, with Withy thus elected.

David Goldie won the 1890 election, but resigned from Parliament in 1891. A deputation requested Sir George Grey to contest the 1891 by-election. Goldie also asked Grey to take his seat. Grey was prepared to put his name forward only if the election was unopposed, as he did not want to suffer the excitement of a contested election. Grey declared his candidacy on 25 March 1891. On 6 April 1891, he was declared elected, as he was unopposed.

The electorate was abolished in 1893 at the end of the 11th Parliament.

== Members ==
Key

Independent Liberal

Election	Winner
1861 election	George Graham
1866 election	George Graham
1869 by-election	Robert Creighton
1871 election	William Swanson
1875 election	William Swanson
1879 election	William Swanson
1881 election	William Swanson
1884 election	Thomas Peacock
1887 election	Edward Withy
1890 election	David Goldie
1891 by-election	Sir George Grey

== Election results ==
=== 1891 by-election ===
1891 Newton by-election
Party	Candidate	Votes	%	±%
Independent	Sir George Grey	Unopposed		
Registered electors		2,088		

=== 1890 election ===
1890 general election, Newton
Party	Candidate	Votes	%	±%
Liberal	David Goldie	Unopposed		
Registered electors		2,088		
