= Ponsonby (New Zealand electorate) =

Ponsonby was a parliamentary electorate in Auckland, New Zealand, from 1887 to 1890 and from 1946 to 1963. The Ponsonby electorate was represented by two Members of Parliament.

== Population centres ==
In the 1887 electoral redistribution, although the Representation Commission was required through the Representation Act 1887 to maintain existing electorates "as far as possible", rapid population growth in the North Island required the transfer of three seats from the South Island to the north. Ten new electorates were created, including Ponsonby, and one former electorate was recreated. The electorate was based on the suburb of Ponsonby.

In December 1887, the House of Representatives voted to reduce its membership from general electorates from 91 to 70. The 1890 electoral redistribution used the same 1886 census data used for the 1887 electoral redistribution. In addition, three-member electorates were introduced in the four main centres. This resulted in a major restructuring of electorates, and the Ponsonby electorate was abolished again. The vast majority of its area went to the City of Auckland electorate, and the balance to the Newton electorate.

The 1941 New Zealand census had been postponed due to World War II, so the 1946 electoral redistribution had to take ten years of population growth and movements into account. The North Island gained a further two electorates from the South Island due to faster population growth. The abolition of the country quota through the Electoral Amendment Act, 1945 reduced the number and increased the size of rural electorates. None of the existing electorates remained unchanged, 27 electorates were abolished, 19 electorates were created for the first time, and eight former electorates were re-established, including Ponsonby.

== History ==
The electorate's first representative was Thomas Peacock, who had represented Auckland electorates since the 1881 election. At the end of the parliamentary term in 1890, Peacock retired and the Ponsonby electorate was abolished.

The electorate was re-established for the 1946 election, and it was represented by Ritchie Macdonald of the Labour Party for its existence until its abolition in 1963. Macdonald successfully contested the Grey Lynn electorate in the 1963 election. Both the Social Credit and Communist Party candidates for Ponsonby in 1960 likewise contested Grey Lynn in 1963.

=== Members of Parliament ===
The electorate was represented by two Members of Parliament.

Key

Independent Labour

Election	Winner
1887 election	Thomas Peacock
(Electorate abolished 1890–1946; see City of Auckland)
1946 election	Ritchie Macdonald
1949 election	Ritchie Macdonald
1951 election	Ritchie Macdonald
1954 election	Ritchie Macdonald
1957 election	Ritchie Macdonald
1960 election	Ritchie Macdonald
(Electorate abolished 1963; see Grey Lynn)

== Election results ==
=== 1960 election ===
1960 general election: Ponsonby
Party	Candidate	Votes	%	±%
Labour	Ritchie Macdonald	9,138	62.99	−4.10
National	Neil Fergusson McLaughlan	4,394	30.29	
Social Credit	Bill Ross	612	4.21	+0.04
Communist	George Jackson	361	2.48	+0.75
Majority		4,744	32.70	−7.40
Turnout		14,505	86.90	−5.03
Registered electors		16,690		

=== 1957 election ===
1957 general election: Ponsonby
Party	Candidate	Votes	%	±%
Labour	Ritchie Macdonald	11,029	67.09	+6.45
National	Gordon Smith	4,437	26.99	
Social Credit	Bill Ross	686	4.17	
Communist	George Jackson	286	1.73	
Majority		6,592	40.10	+12.54
Turnout		16,438	91.93	+3.11
Registered electors		17,880		

=== 1954 election ===
1954 general election: Ponsonby
Party	Candidate	Votes	%	±%
Labour	Ritchie Macdonald	8,684	60.64	+4.48
National	Harold Barry	4,734	33.05	
Social Credit	John Stackpole	716	5.00	
Communist	Hugh McLeod	186	1.29	
Majority		3,948	27.56	+15.24
Turnout		14,320	88.82	+1.66
Registered electors		16,122		

=== 1951 election ===
1951 general election: Ponsonby
Party	Candidate	Votes	%	±%
Labour	Ritchie Macdonald	6,855	56.16	−1.46
National	Peter Dempsey	5,351	43.83	
Majority		1,504	12.32	−5.32
Turnout		12,206	87.16	−6.56
Registered electors		14,004		

=== 1949 election ===
1949 general election: Ponsonby
Party	Candidate	Votes	%	±%
Labour	Ritchie Macdonald	7,439	57.62	−5.37
National	Brian Kingston	5,161	39.97	
Independent Liberal	William Frederick Jamieson	169	1.30	
Communist	Henry Mornington Smith	140	1.08	
Majority		2,278	17.64	−8.35
Turnout		12,909	93.72	−0.97
Registered electors		13,774		

=== 1946 election ===
1946 general election: Ponsonby
Party	Candidate	Votes	%	±%
Labour	Ritchie Macdonald	8,314	62.99	
National	Peter Dempsey	4,883	37.01	
Majority		3,431	25.99	
Turnout		13,197	94.69	
Registered electors		13,937		

== Bibliography ==
- McRobie, Alan (1989). Electoral Atlas of New Zealand. Wellington: GP Books. ISBN 0-477-01384-8.
- Wilson, Jim (1985) [First published in 1913]. New Zealand Parliamentary Record, 1840–1984 (4th ed.). Wellington: V.R. Ward, Govt. Printer. OCLC 154283103.
- Norton, Clifford (1988). New Zealand Parliamentary Election Results 1946–1987: Occasional Publications No 1, Department of Political Science. Wellington: Victoria University of Wellington. ISBN 0-475-11200-8.
