= James Bradney =

New Zealand politician

James Henry Bradney
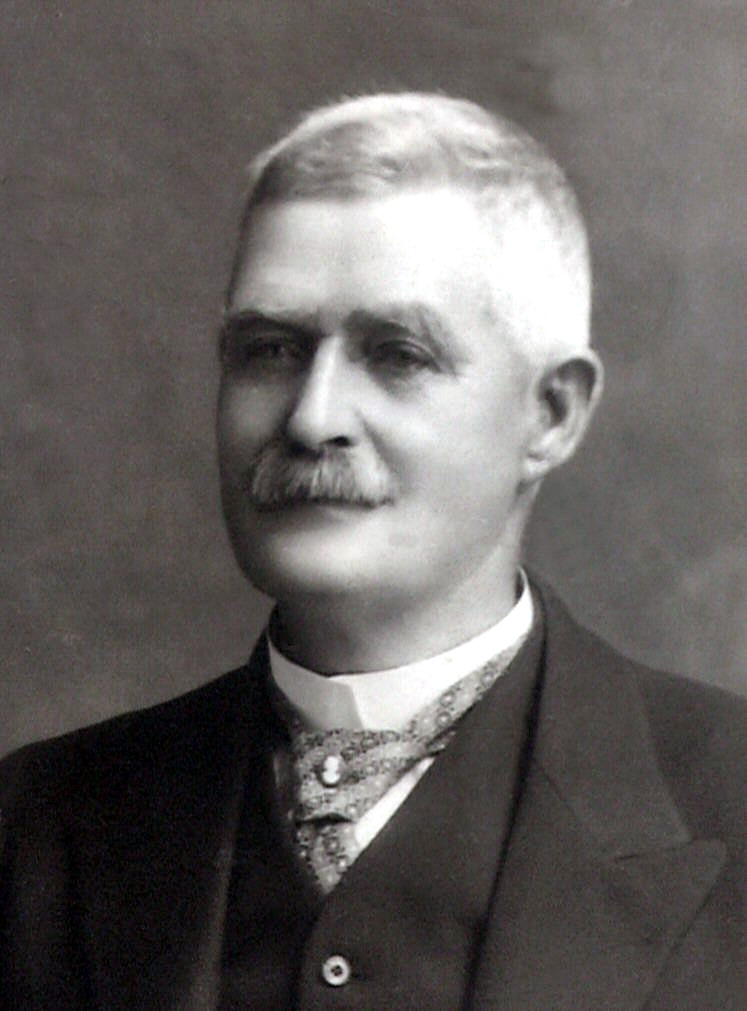

Personal details
- Born: 2 April 1853 Wolverhampton, Staffordshire, England
- Died: 26 May 1936 (aged 83) Epsom, Auckland, New Zealand
- Party: Reform Party
- Occupation: Politician; Shipping proprietor

James Henry Bradney (2 April 1853 – 26 May 1936) was a Reform Party member of parliament and shipping proprietor in New Zealand.

== Early life ==
James Henry Bradney was born on 2 April 1853 at Wolverhampton, Staffordshire, the son of Joseph Bradney, coachsmith & ironmonger, and Emily née Morris. Joseph and Emily, with James Henry and three other children, emigrated on the Mermaid from Liverpool on 11 July 1859, arriving at Auckland, New Zealand on 19 October.

Bradney's early schooling was at Takapuna. At age 11 he went to work on a farm, and remained there three years. He later worked in a bakery, and as a butcher and grocer.

== Maritime activities ==
Bradney ran away to sea and joined the small steamer Go Ahead as a deck hand. He later sailed round the coast for some time in the three-masted schooner Policeman, then went bushfelling at Coromandel, and gold mining at Thames.

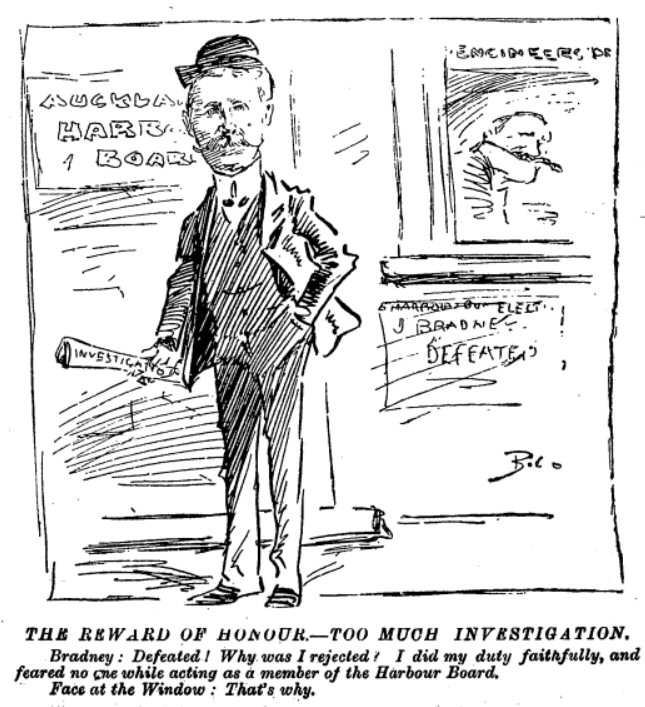
Observer newspaper cartoon of Captain Bradney while on the Auckland Harbour Board in 1909.

Still later he rowed ferry boats plying between Auckland and Northcote, on Auckland's North Shore. He served on the Lily, the first steamer to enter the Kaipara service, and then went abroad on deep-sea vessels.

While in Geelong, near Melbourne, Australia, Bradney met his future wife, Mary Jane Haxton, whom he married in Auckland in 1878 when he was a pilot on the Kaipara bar. He then worked for the Auckland Harbour Board, and finally became a waterman, one of the hardy band of men whose boats formed the means of communication between shore and ship.

In 1884 Captain Bradney joined forces with his brother-in-law Ernest Charles Binns (who had emigrated to New Zealand on the same ship, the Mermaid) forming the firm of Bradney & Binns with the launch Despatch. The Vivid was purchased in 1892, and on 26 March 1904 Captain Bradney's daughter Blanche launched the Pitoitoi I. The replacement Pitoitoi II was brought into service in 1908.

The firm was succeeded by J H Bradney & Sons in 1934, and at the time of Captain Bradney's death in 1936 was operating the Onewa, Kaipatiki, Matareka, and Presto, the latter being used by the port health officer.

== Political life ==
New Zealand Parliament
Years	Term	Electorate	Party
1911–1914	18th	Auckland West	Reform

Bradney was elected to the Auckland West electorate in the 1911 general election, but was defeated in 1914.

He was a member of the Auckland Harbour Board from 1907 to 1915, and 1922 to 1923.

== Later life ==
Captain Bradney was at one time on the Mt Albert Borough Council. He was a life member of the Auckland Choral Society, with which he was associated for 50 years, and a member of the Amateur Opera Club & Auckland Liedertafel.

He died at Epsom, Auckland on 26 May 1936, survived by his wife and six children, Henry Cooper, Horace Launcelot, Blanche Ada, Elizabeth Beatrice, Frederick Charles, and Douglas Eric, two other children having died as infants. He is buried at Hillsborough Cemetery, Auckland.
