= George Graham (New Zealand politician) =

New Zealand politician

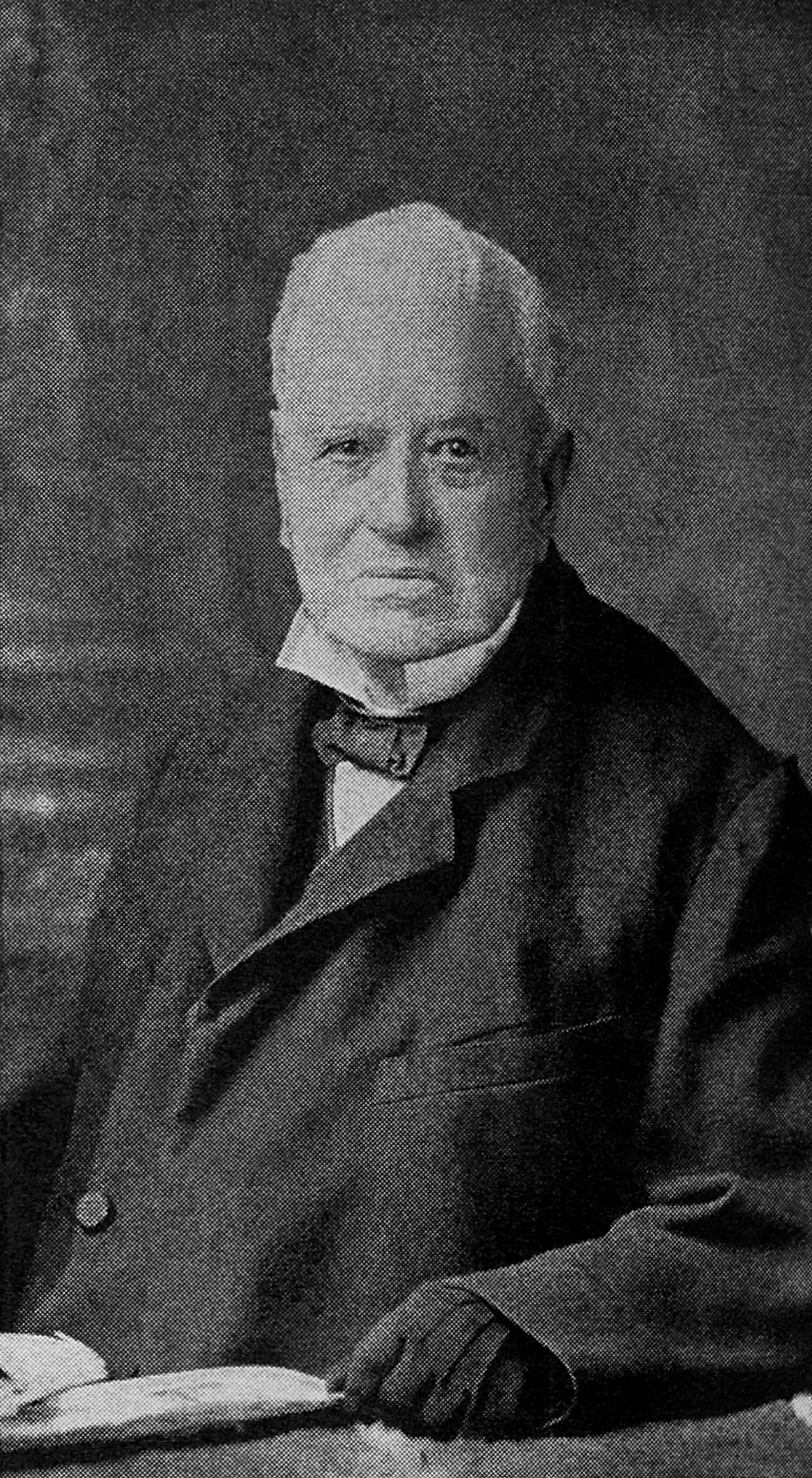
- George Graham, c. 1900
- Born: 10 December 1812; Frogmore, Berkshire, England
- Died: 14 February 1901 (aged 88); 42 Tisbury Road, Hove, Brighton, England
- Spouse: Jane Sargeant
- Children: William Australia Graham
- Relatives: George Samuel Graham (grandson)
- Military career
- Allegiance: United Kingdom
- Branch: Board of Ordnance
- Rank: Clerk of Works
- Unit: Corps of Royal Engineers
- Campaigns: Flagstaff War (military works); Second Opium War
- Other work: Farmer; Member of the New Zealand House of Representatives for Newton, 1861–69; Justice of the Peace for the Colony of New Zealand, 1861

George Graham (10 December 1812 – 14 February 1901) was a Scottish military engineer in the Corps of Royal Engineers and a Member of the New Zealand House of Representatives.

Graham was born in 1812 at Frogmore in Berkshire, England, and christened at St George's Chapel, Windsor Castle, that year. He belonged to Clan Graham, and his grandfather was an interpreter between the Scottish and English. He became clerk of works with the Board of Ordnance aged 19, and was assigned to the Royal Engineers for the next 25 years. He was posted to Ireland in 1835, to New South Wales in 1836, and to New Zealand in 1840. Graham accompanied the staff of Lieutenant Governor William Hobson to New Zealand and was present at the signing of the Treaty of Waitangi in February 1840.

Back in Sydney, in May he received an order to return to New Zealand "to superintend the erection and take charge of the military and convict buildings there". Departing on the Victoria of Bristol on 9 August, Lieutenant Henry Williamson Lugard, RE, with Graham, wife and children, Captain William Foster and 23 soldiers of the 80th Regiment as military artificers, arrived at Kororareka on 18 August. Regardless of the unsuitability of Russell/Okiato as a capital of New Zealand, its detachment—1 officer, 1 non commissioned officer and 25 men—required shelter, and Lots 1, 2 and waterfront, Block 2, Hobson Street, were assigned for barracks. With no definite guidance from Lieutenant Colonel George Barney, CRE, in Sydney, and left to improvise, Lugard, Graham and the artificers constructed a temporary rustic loop-holed barrack with attached rear cookhouse of saplings; two roomed officer’s quarter; separate officer’s kitchen; privies; and partially erected a wooden barrack house from Sydney, at Russell/Okiato within four months. As soon as that was done, Hobson moved the capital to the Waitematā Harbour.

Graham's work for the Royal Engineers involved public works, roads and military installations. The Flagstaff War in the Bay of Islands in 1845–1846 put a scare to the population of Auckland, and Graham supervised the enlargement of the Albert Barracks overlooking the town. He later claimed that the fortification of the barracks was not necessary, but by doing so, it would prevent the subdivision of the hill and that the area could thus later become a park. Indeed, Albert Park was formed in the 1880s.

Graham was then sent to China, where he suffered a nervous breakdown after witnessing a fellow soldier being buried alive. He resigned from the military and returned to New Zealand, where he took up farming in Māngere.

He represented the Newton electorate from 1861 to 1869, when he resigned. He was described by one newspaper as "a well-known Maori sympathiser".

New Zealand Parliament
Years	Term	Electorate	Party
1861–1866	3rd	Newton	Independent
1866–1869	4th	Newton	Independent

Graham retired to Hove, Brighton, in England for the last years of his life. He died at home on 14 February 1901. His son James Bannatyne Graham married Elizabeth Mary Josephine Sheehan, the sister of cabinet minister John Sheehan. Their son was George Samuel Graham.

New Zealand Parliament
New constituency	Member of Parliament for Newton; 1861–1869	Succeeded by Robert James Creighton
