= Katherine Withy =

New Zealand philosopher

- Born: Katherine Amy Withy; 1981 (age 44–45); Whangaparāoa, New Zealand
- Other name: Kate Withy
- Awards: Mellon Fellowship

Education
- Education: University of Chicago
- Thesis: Heidegger on Being Uncanny (2009)
- Doctoral advisor: Jonathan Lear
- Other advisors: John Haugeland; Eric Santner

Philosophical work
- Era: Contemporary philosophy
- Region: Western philosophy
- School: Continental philosophy
- Institutions: Georgetown University
- Main interests: Martin Heidegger; phenomenology; existential philosophy
- Website: www.katherinewithy.net

Katherine Amy Withy (born 1981) is a New Zealand philosopher and professor of philosophy at Georgetown University. She specializes in the work of Martin Heidegger and has written on topics such as self-concealment, affectivity, uncanniness, and the ontology of meaning.

== Early life and education ==
Born 1981, Withy grew up in Whangaparāoa and was educated at Orewa College. She studied at the University of Auckland, graduating with a Bachelor of Arts degree in 2001, and a Bachelor of Arts (Honours) in philosophy in 2002. She went on to undertake doctoral studies in philosophy at the University of Chicago and was awarded a fellowship by the Andrew W. Mellon Foundation. Her doctoral thesis, supervised by Jonathan Lear and completed in 2009, was titled Heidegger on being uncanny.

== Academic career ==
In 2009, Withy was appointed to the faculty of Georgetown University. Her research focuses on the work of 20th-century German philosopher Martin Heidegger, and in particular his conception of the human being as open to meaning and subject to breakdowns of meaning.

== Books ==
- Heidegger on Being Uncanny (Harvard University Press, 2015)
- Heidegger on Being Self-Concealing (Oxford University Press, 2022)
- Heidegger on Being Affected (Cambridge University Press, 2024)
