= 1875 City of Auckland West by-elections =

Two New Zealand by-elections

The 1875 City of Auckland West by-elections were two by-elections held in the City of Auckland West electorate in Auckland, following two resignations during the 4th New Zealand Parliament

- Thomas Gillies resigned when he was appointed a judge of the Supreme Court and was replaced unopposed on 27 March by George Grey.
- John Williamson died on 16 February and was replaced on 14 April by Patrick Dignan. He was opposed by Joseph Dargaville, a member of the Orange Order, Dignan was a Catholic.

== Results ==
April 1875 City of Auckland West by-election
Party	Candidate	Votes	%	±%
Independent	Patrick Dignan	565	59.41	
Independent	Joseph Dargaville	386	40.59	
Turnout		951		
Majority		179	18.82	
