= James Williamson (New Zealand politician) =

New Zealand politician

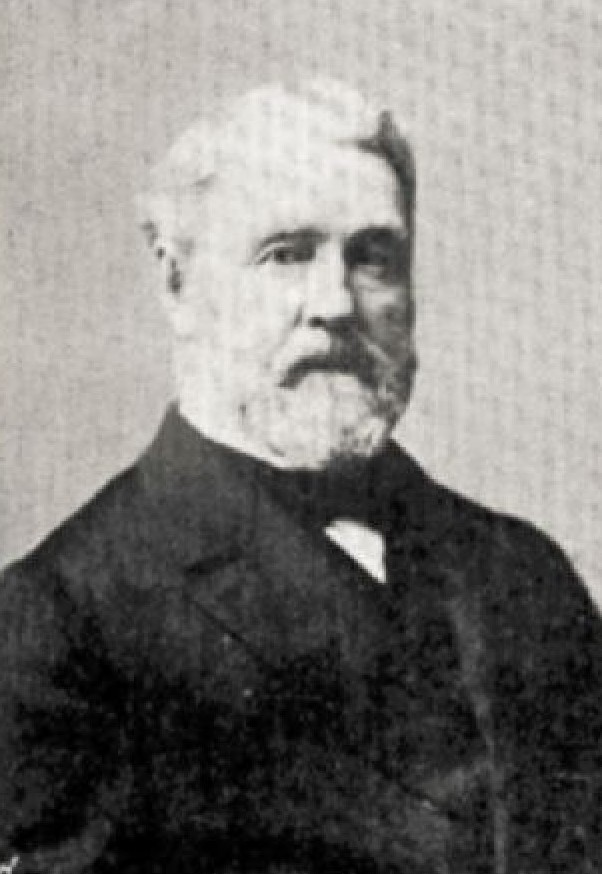

James Williamson (1814 – 22 March 1888) was a 19th-century Member of Parliament, merchant and land speculator in the Auckland Region, New Zealand.

== Biography ==
New Zealand Parliament
Years	Term	Electorate	Party
1862–1866	3rd	Auckland West	Independent
1866–1867	4th	Auckland West	Independent

Williamson was born in Belfast, Ireland, probably in 1814. His parents were Ann Gardiner and Thomas Williamson, who owned ships and was a linen merchant. James Williamson started going to sea at a young age on his father's ships. He went to the Bay of Islands in 1840 and settled in Russell, New Zealand.

He represented the Auckland West electorate from 1862 to 1867, when he resigned.

He was then appointed to the Legislative Council in 1870 and remained a member until his death in 1888.

He was a successful businessman and was a co-founder of the New Zealand Insurance Company (1859), the Bank of New Zealand (1861), and the New Zealand Loan and Mercantile Agency Company (1865). In 1877 he built the Pah Homestead (or The Pah) a historic stately home on Pah Farm a 313-acre estate located in the Auckland suburb of Hillsborough. He became insolvent during the fall of value of rural land in the 1880s, and his was the most spectacular failure of the successful Auckland businessmen.
