= Benjamin Tonks =

New Zealand politician

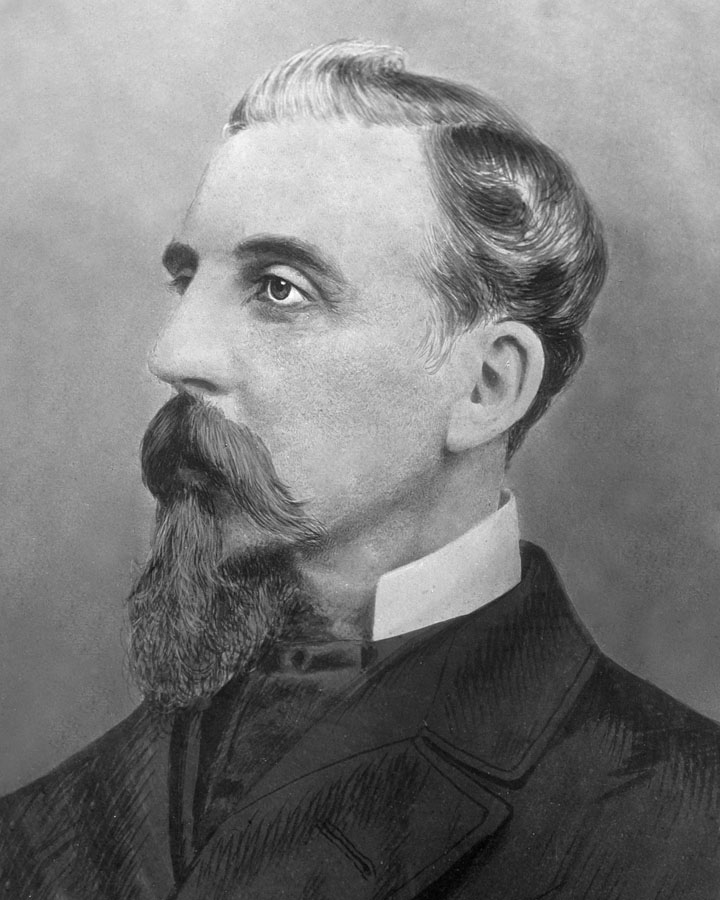

4th Mayor of Auckland
- In office 1875–1876
- Succeeded by: William John Hurst

Personal details
- Born: 1832
- Died: 27 June 1884 (aged 51–52)

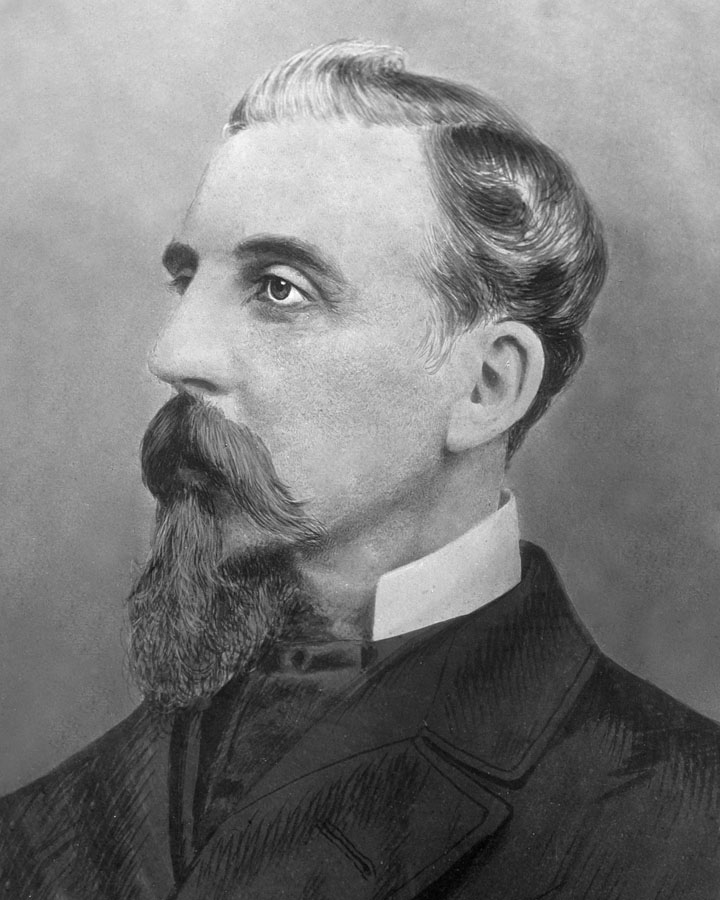
Benjamin Tonks was Mayor of Auckland City from 1875 to 1876

New Zealand Parliament
Years	Term	Electorate	Party
1876–1877	6th	City of Auckland West	Independent

Benjamin Tonks (1832 – 27 June 1884) was a 19th-century mayor and Member of Parliament in Auckland, New Zealand.

Tonks was elected to the Parnell electorate of the Auckland Provincial Council in 1871. He represented Parnell in the 6th and 7th council until the abolition of provincial government in 1876.

He was the Mayor of Auckland City from 1875 to 1876. He defeated the incumbent mayor Frederick Prime 1,062 votes to 402 in the first direct election for the position by the public.

At the 1876 by-election which followed the resignation of Sir George Grey, he was elected to represent the City of Auckland West electorate. He resigned in 1877.

He died at his home in Remuera on 27 June 1884.

Political offices
Preceded by Frederick Prime	Mayor of Auckland City; 1875–1876	Succeeded by William John Hurst
