= 1876 City of Auckland West by-election =

New Zealand by-election

The 1876 City of Auckland West by-election was a by-election held on 25 July 1876 in the City of Auckland West electorate during the 6th New Zealand Parliament. It was then a two-member electorate.

The by-election was caused by the resignation of the incumbent, George Grey.

Benjamin Tonks, the Mayor of Auckland City, was elected by a large majority.

== Result ==
The following table gives the election result:

1876 City of Auckland West by-election
Party	Candidate	Votes	%	±%
Independent	Benjamin Tonks	656	92.79	
Independent	Henry Warner Farnall	232	33.57	
Independent	Singleton Rochford	13	1.84	
Majority		618	87.41	
Informal votes		12		
Turnout		719		
