= Furness Withy =

British shipping company, 1891–1980

- House flag
- Industry: Transport
- Founded: 1891
- Defunct: 1980
- Fate: Acquired
- Successor: Orient Overseas Container Line
- Headquarters: Hartlepool, UK
- Key people: Christopher Furness Henry Withy Sir James Steel (Chairman)

Furness Withy was a major British transport business. It was listed on the London Stock Exchange.

== History ==
The company was founded by Christopher Furness and Henry Withy (1852–1922) in 1891 in Hartlepool. This was achieved by the amalgamation of the Furness Line of steamers with the business of Edward Withy and Co., iron and steel shipbuilders and repairers, of West Hartlepool, which was founded by Edward Withy (1844-1927), Henry Withy's brother. An early acquisition in 1900 was a controlling interest in Richardsons Westgarth & Company, a marine engineering business.

Furness, Withy started with 18 vessels and over the subsequent years it owned in excess of a thousand ships. It bought the Prince line in 1916. In 1917 the Furness Shipbuilding Co Ltd was established, at Haverton Hill, River Tees, initially for war production. The Furness family sold its interests in the Company to a consortium led by Frederick Lewis, a Director in the business, in 1919.

Also in 1919, Furness, Withy bought from Canada Steamship Lines the Quebec Steam Ship Company, which ran scheduled services between New York and Bermuda. Furness, Withy renamed its acquisition the Furness Bermuda Line. In 1928 Furness, Withy acquired the Red Cross Line.

In 1965 Furness, Withy acquired Royal Mail Lines (formerly Royal Mail Steam Packet Company) in 1965.

In 1965, British and Commonwealth Shipping, Furness Withy, P&O and The Ocean Steamship Company established Overseas Containers Limited to exploit containerisation.

In 1966 Furness, Withy terminated its Furness Bermuda Line operation.

In 1968 Furness, Withy bought the Houlder Group, a company with offshore oil interests. Furness Withy bought Manchester Liners in 1970.

The company was acquired by the Orient Overseas Container Line of Hong Kong in 1980. In 1990 it was resold to the Oetker Group, who at the time of purchase were the owners of Hamburg Süd.

== Ships and services ==
Furness Withy operated both tramp and liner services. The latter included transatlantic Royal Mail and passenger routes, initially from West Hartlepool to Boston and New York, and later from Liverpool to St John's, Newfoundland, Halifax, Nova Scotia and Boston. The Liverpool — Boston route was worked by a pair of sister ships, RMS Newfoundland and RMS Nova Scotia. The first Newfoundland and Nova Scotia were built in 1925 and 1926 but were requisitioned in 1940 and 1941. Both were lost to enemy action: Nova Scotia as a troop ship in 1942; Newfoundland as a hospital ship in 1943. S.S. Fort Amherst and her sister ship S.S. Fort Townshend were built by Blythswood Shipbuilding in 1936. They sailed between Newfoundland, Nova Scotia, New York and the British West Indies. In 1952 S.S. Fort Amherst she was taken over by the Royal Fleet Auxiliary after the explosion of the RFA Bedenham and renamed RFA Amherst. A second Newfoundland and Nova Scotia were built as replacements in 1947 and served until 1962, when Furness, Withy sold them to Dominion Navigation Co. A third Newfoundland and Nova Scotia were built in 1964 and 1965, and were chartered to Shaw, Savill & Albion Line in 1973.

== See also ==
- Edward Withy

== Sources and further reading ==
- Burrell, David (1992). Furness Withy, 1891–1991. Kendal: World Ship Society. ISBN 0905617703.
- Haws, Duncan (2000). Furness Withy. Merchant Fleets. Vol. 37. Crowborough: Travel Creatours Ltd. ISBN 094637838X.
- Haws, Duncan (2000). Furness Withy's Manchester Liners Houlders Alexander Prince & Rio Cape Lines. Merchant Fleets. Vol. 38. Crowborough: Travel Creatours Ltd. ISBN 0946378398.
- Stoker, Robert B (1985). The Saga of Manchester Liners. Douglas: Kinglish Ltd. ISBN 0-9507480-2-1.
