= Henry Withy =

British engineer (1852–1922)

Henry Withy (11 November 1852 – 31 May 1922) was a shipbuilder and ship owner involved in local government of Hartlepool as a magistrate and councillor, and member of various boards and committees.

== Early life ==
Withy was born in Bristol, son of woollen draper and tailor Edward Withy and Sarah (née Atree). In his early childhood, he attended Brean Villa (Quaker) Preparatory School, Camden Terrace, Weston Super Mare, in Somerset. At the age of 10, he went to Friends' School, Sidcot, from 1862 to 1867. He served as an apprentice at Withy, Alexander & Co. in West Hartlepool for 5 years, between 1869 and 1874.

== Ship-building ==
Withy was first employed by large hardware establishment in the City of Bristol but he did not remain there long. He started business at the beginning of 1868, and twelve months later moved to Hartlepool, where he went into the yard of Withy, Alexander and Co. where his elder brother, Edward Withy was a partner. Here, he worked as an apprentice for five years, whilst picking up the rudiments of the knowledge of shipbuilding. In the 19th century, the Clyde was in the hey-day of its fame as a shipbuilding centre and he went there to improve his knowledge of the profession of shipbuilding. In 1873, Withy went to the historic shipyard of Robert Napier and Sons at Govan, and subsequently to the Fairfield Shipbuilding and Engineering Company. Having spent three years on Clyde side, he returned to his brother's yard at Hartlepool. Before settling down to a business career, he decided to travel, and took an extended trip to South America.

Upon his return home in 1876, Withy assisted his brother Edward in the management of the business of Edward Withy and Co. for about two years, after which Edward Withy retired and moved to New Zealand. Henry Withy thereby assumed sole responsibility for managing the works. In 1891, the Furness Line Company of Christopher Furness and Edward Withy and Co. were merged in Hartlepool. to form the Company of Furness Withy.

Withy's knowledge of electricity enabled him to put it to use both as motive power and for motor purposes, as well as for lighting the works. All of Furness, Withy and Co., Limited's machines ran on electricity; it was at the time the only shipyard in the United Kingdom to be driven throughout by electric power. Furness, Withy and Co. were also pioneers in the building of the first triple steamship in the port, and with the first use of telephone communication.

In 1869, the average tonnage of the vessels they built was 436 tons; in 1879, it was 1,145 tons; in 1899 it had increased to 5,442 tons. In 1900, the shipyard was equipped for dealing with vessels of up to 600 ft (180 m) in length, and has turned out numerous fine passenger and cargo boats. The yard also possessed a graving dock, capable of taking in steamers up to 7,000 tons deadweight, where many extensive jobs were undertaken.

== Private life ==
Withy was a Justice of the Peace (JP) and Town Councillor for the Borough of Hartlepool, member of the Board of Guardians, member of the Port Sanitary Authority, member of Lloyd's Technical Sub-Committee, member of the Institute of Naval Architects, of the Steel and Iron Institute, of the Institution of Mechanical Engineers (5 August 1884, proposed by his brother Edward Withy), of the Institute of Civil Engineers (6 December 1904) and of the North-East Coast Institution of Engineers and Shipbuilders (past President, 1900–1901). He was also Mayor of Hartlepool in 1889–90.

In 1902, he presented an ornamental drinking fountain that originally stood in the Burn Valley Gardens but was moved to Clarence Road, Hartlepool in 1979.
