= Edward Withy =

Edward Withy (c. 1844 – 26 March 1927) was born in Bristol, England and in 1869 co-founded a shipbuilding partnership at Hartlepool that eventually became part of Furness Withy. He sold the firm in 1884 and emigrated from England to New Zealand, where he was elected to Member of Parliament in 1887, representing the Auckland electorate of Newton. He was the father of Arthur Withy, journalist and political activist. Like his son, he was a single-taxer (i.e. land tax) and follower of Henry George.

== Early life ==
Edward Withy was born at Bristol on 22 December 1844, of Quaker stock. He was educated at the Friends' School, Sidcot for 5½ years which he attended between 1854 and 1859. In 1858, whilst at Sidcot, he was one of three boys sent in successfully for the first Cambridge junior local examination ever held. The university records show that his pass at the age of 14 included pure mathematics, mechanics and hydrostatics – an evidence of his ability and bent, and of the remarkable standard of education reached over 150 years ago, when Henry Dymond was headmaster.

== Ship-building ==
Edward Withy left Sidcot at the end of 1859 and in the summer of 1860 went to Stockton-On-Tees to learn iron shipbuilding at the works of Messrs. Richardson, Duck and Company, where he became a "Ship Draftsman Apprentice". Whilst away from his family in Bristol, he boarded with William Marwood, at York Street in Thornaby, Durham.

On completing his apprenticeship, in December 1865, he entered the iron shipbuilding industry, being employed by the Stockton shipbuilder Richardson, Duck & Co., in which he was very successful. During his first two years, his employers were engaged upon contracts for the P. & O. Steamship Co., and he was placed in charge of this special work, travelling extensively in eastern waters. This work resulted in his becoming acquainted with the managing directors, who upon the completion of the contracts made him an offer to enter their service and he soon rose to be manager of the yard. In this capacity he made a trip round the Cape to Bombay in 1867 and he spent some time in sketching and increasing his acquaintance with the work required of the steamers. In returning to England he spent a week on the isthmus of Suez inspecting the great canal works then nearing completion.

In February 1868, he married Miss Anne Treadgold of Stockton-On-Tees and during the remainder of that year he was engaged as draughtsman and over-looker at the building of the S.S. Deccan for the P. & O. Co., by Messrs. William Denny & Bros., of Dumbarton. In February, 1869, he resigned his appointment in order to become a partner in a new shipbuilding firm at Hartlepool, which eventually became known as Edward Withy & Co. In 1869, Edward Withy formed a shipbuilding partnership in Hartlepool, with Edward Alexander, who had been head cashier at Denton, Gray (WITHY, ALEXANDER & Company – HARTLEPOOL – 1869–1874). They took over Denton Gray's former Middleton shipyard and their first ship was the Maria Ysabel, launched in May 1869. About this time, he also took a trip to Australia for the benefit of his health with his wife and son (Alfred James Withy, born 4 December 1869), and there developed a liking for the Colonies.

On 6 Jun 1871, he was proposed for membership of the Institute of Mechanical Engineers, by Daniel Adamson, William Richardson and R Longridge and was accepted in July 1871.

He had a most successful career as a shipbuilder and became an authority on naval architecture. His firm launched from the Middleton Yard 130 cargo and passenger steamers and, recognizing the advantage of seeking the intelligent co-operation of their employees, adopted a system by which they offered pecuniary " awards " to any who devised plans which would effect improvements either in the construction of steamers, or in methods of manufacture. This worked very satisfactorily to all concerned under the wise "adjudications" of the committee appointed. The firm was always early in the field with improvements that came to the front, and early in 1884 completed the first exclusively cargo steamer which had been fitted with "triple expansion" engines.

On 2 November 1872, a patent (No. 3252) for improvements in mixing, charging, and smelting iron ores was taken out by Edward Withy and William Gibson, of West Hartlepool, Durham. The object of this invention was to save fuel as much as possible. In effecting this, in the first place, the ores are crushed and ground, and the smaller they are ground the less fuel they take to smelt them. Second. The pulverised ores are mixed with the required quantity of lime and water to a stiff paste, which paste is forced into moulds or through dies, in a similar manner to drain tiles, the dies being made to give such shape or form to charging sections as will afford the greatest amount of heating surface, according to the weight and strength of the materials. With these sections are charged blast furnaces, puddling-furnaces, cupolas, and vibratory-furnaces, in manner described in Letters Patent No. 2672, A.d. 1872, and more especially they are used in the improved puddling-furnaces described in said Letters Patent.

The company prospered in the good times that followed the Franco-German War and in 1873, they enlarged the shipyard, allowing the firm to undertake the construction of up to five vessels at one time. At the end of this year, Edward Alexander retired. Following Alexander's retirement, Edward Withy carried on with the business alone and he founded Edward Withy and Company shipbuilders in 1874, being joined by his brother Henry Withy. In 1880, the yard launched the Cyanus, which was the first steel ship to be built in Hartlepool. Before this, all ships were made of wood or iron. In the 1881 census of England, he was listed as a "Ship Builder Employing 770 Men and 4 Boys". Edward Withy was a hard student of the principles applicable in the work to which his powers were devoted, not neglecting the opportunities he enjoyed of bringing everything he learned to the test of practice. In papers read before the naval engineers, in articles to magazines and newspapers and in evidence before bodies of official engineers, he at various times expounded his opinions, always with singular clearness, gaining the applause of experts and the universal esteem of the ship owning, building and sailing communities.

He was a member of the Institute of Mechanical Engineers, the Institute of Naval Architects, the Iron and Steel Institute and the Cleveland Institute of Engineers. Through the annual summer meetings of these bodies, he had extensive opportunities to visit and become acquainted with the operations of many of the largest industrial establishments of England and several on the Continent.

== Furness Withy ==
One of the firm's chief customers was local businessmen Thomas and Christopher Furness who had commenced ship owning in 1878 and in 1883, with an established and profitable shipping line behind him, Christopher Furness was able to buy a controlling interest in shipbuilders Edward Withy and Company, of West Hartlepool.

In May, 1884, at the early age of 40, he surprised his friends by retiring from the firm and deciding to move to New Zealand. Christopher Furness bought his shares in the shipyard and made Edward Withy's brother, Henry Withy, managing director. In 1885, Christopher Furness collaborated with Thomas Wilson to form the Wilson-Furness Line to operate services between Newcastle and New York and by 1891 the fleet contained 18 ships. The company continued under its own name until 1891, when Edward Withy and Company was merged with some of Christopher Furness' other businesses and became part of Furness, Withy and Co. with Christopher Furness as chairman, R. B. Stoker as ship director, Henry Withy and R. W. Vick as shipyard representatives, plus Thomas King and G. L. Wooley. From 1891 to 1908, the yard operated as Furness, Withy & Company Ltd.

Furness Withy was incorporated as a company in 1891 upon the amalgamation of Christopher Furness' business in West Hartlepool and London with Edward Withy's shipbuilding yard in Hartlepool. By 1914 the company had acquired interests all over the world in liner and tramp shipping and in shipbuilding, but from 1920 they concentrated on liner services. In addition to the North Atlantic service, they developed other American routes based principally on New York and including Bermuda and the West Indies. The Furness family sold its interests in the company to a consortium led by Frederick Lewis, a Director in the business, in 1919.

== Move to New Zealand ==
After his retirement in 1884, Edward Withy and his wife, Anne and nine children (Alfred, Arthur, Bertha, Charles, Florence, Harold, Herbert, Marion and Walter) to New Zealand, and settled in Auckland. Of his going to New Zealand, Edward Withy said, in a speech before the Hartlepool Ship Owners Society on the occasion of a farewell presentation in 1884:

I might sum up my reasons for leaving the country into one. I believe that in the country to which we are going there is a larger and more hopeful sphere for a young family than in this. A man with a family ought to make it his principal duty to bring them up in the best way possible. As to slaving away at business to amass a considerable fortune for the purpose of leaving a large portion to each child, I think it one of the most harmful engagements in which a man can enter. One of the most important things he should do is to devote his time and personal influence to the education and the forming of the minds of his children. Sending them to school and spending so much per year does not end the parents' responsibility; they should get a thorough hold on their children's affections. New Zealand is in many ways a more hopeful country than this.

He was a keen traveller and up to 1918 had covered 450,000 sea miles, which included 31 times across the equator.

== Parliamentarian ==
New Zealand Parliament
Years	Term	Electorate	Party
1887–1890	9th	Newton	Independent

After retiring from shipbuilding and emigrating to New Zealand, while still in his prime, in 1887, he contested the Newton electorate against Joseph Tole, who at that time was Minister of Justice and who had represented the Eden electorate since the 1876 election, and Henry Thomas Garrett. Tole and Garrett were liberal politicians, whilst Withy was a conservative. The liberal vote was split, with Tole and Garrett receiving 606 and 170 votes, respectively, and Withy was elected with 701 votes. To the astonishment of many people, the newcomer won the electorate.

For years Withy had been a Land Nationalist, a follower of Professor Alfred Russel Wallace, but on reading Progress and Poverty in the early 1880s he became a disciple of the 'Prophet of San Francisco'. However, he quickly tired of Parliamentary life, as he retained his electorate for only three years, between 1887 and 1890. He did not contest the 1890 election.

He was also a life member of the Auckland Institute and read several papers during his time in New Zealand – including:

- The Stability of Ships: its Principles made clear by Models and Diagrams By Edward Withy, Read before the Auckland Institute 10 August 1891 (see:http://rsnz.natlib.govt.nz/volume/rsnz_24/rsnz_24_00_004770.pdf)
- Sanitation and Ventilation as required in a Modern House, By Edward Withy, Read before the Auckland Institute, 3 October 1892 (see:http://rsnz.natlib.govt.nz/volume/rsnz_25/rsnz_25_00_004880.pdf).
- The Economic Effects of Various Land-tenures By Edward Withy, Read before the Auckland Institute 18 June 1894 (see:http://rsnz.natlib.govt.nz/volume/rsnz_27/rsnz_27_00_005160.pdf).

He then went to live in the Taranaki district, and in 1893, he again stood for Parliament, but this time in the Auckland electorate. His main objective was to do propaganda work for the Single Tax, and, owing to the prominence that he gave to this plank of his platform, he came seventh of ten candidates in the three-member electorate. For years he was acting president of the Auckland Anti-Poverty Society, Sir George Grey being honorary president. He was also for some time president of the National Single Tax League, and a vice-president and member of the Executive of the New Zealand Land Values League, and a generous subscriber to its funds.

== Single Tax ==
Edward Withy reproduced several of his lectures on the Single Tax in pamphlet form, and wrote numerous letters to the press. He also wrote an article, "Daylight on the Land Question," in the Westminster Review and has written more ambitious pamphlets on the question, the best known of which is "Ground Rent, The True Source of Public Revenue: How to Secure It for this Purpose by Means of the Single Tax."

Many years later, in 1923, he returned from New Zealand and spent the last four years of his life in Jersey in the Channel Islands with his youngest daughter, Helby. His wife, Anne Withy, died on 21 April 1925 and Edward Withy died on 26 March 1927 in St. Luke's, Jersey, Channel Islands, at the age of 83. He left a family of five sons and five daughters, twenty-five grandchildren and five great-grandchildren; one son had been killed in the war.

== Eulogies ==
Sir George B. Hunter, head of the firm of Swan, Hunter & Wigham Richardson, of Wallsend-on-Tyne, wrote of Withy "I think there was no man I admired and esteemed so much. I knew him many years ago." One of Withy's old employees writes: It was in 1873 that I left school and went into the office at the Middleton Yard and at Mr. Withy's suggestion I learned shorthand and did his correspondence and was thrown a good deal into his company. To have known him in those early days was a privilege I have never failed to value. I have respected and admired him and that absolutely without qualification. In no single respect did I ever need to qualify my admiration. In character, in manners (even to me as an office boy), in qualities of mind, in loftiness of aims as a good citizen and as a conscientious Churchman, in every way he was an ideal among men. All my life it has been my practice to cite him to my own boys and to others as a ' perfect gentleman'. When he gave up a prosperous business and the promise of a great commercial career and went to New Zealand most of his contemporaries thought it quixotic and foolish, but the sacrifice showed a noble spirit and proved that at any rate he knew how to pursue worthier ends than mere money-making He leaves a fragrant memory."

One of his sons, Arthur Withy of Wellington, was a member of the Hansard newspaper reporting staff, who died in 1943.

== Notes ==
New Zealand Parliament
Preceded by Thomas Peacock	Member of Parliament for Newton; 1887–1890	Succeeded by David Goldie
