= Patrick Dignan (politician) =

New Zealand politician

New Zealand Parliament
Years	Term	Electorate	Party
1867–1870	4th	City of Auckland West	Independent
1875	5th	City of Auckland West	Independent
1875–1879	6th	City of Auckland West	Independent

Patrick Dignan (1814 – 20 October 1894) was a 19th-century Member of Parliament in Auckland, New Zealand.

He was born in Loughrea, County Galway, Ireland. He emigrated to New South Wales in 1839 and came to Auckland on the Sophia Pate in 1841. He was a leading Catholic layman in Auckland and was a member of the board of governors of St Peter's School.

== Politics ==
Dignan was a member of the Auckland Provincial Council for most of the years of its existence. At the inaugural 1853 New Zealand provincial elections, he was elected for the Northern Division and he represented it until 1857. From 1857 to 1861, he represented the City of Auckland electorate on the provincial council. From 1865 until the end of provincial government in October 1876, he was a member of the Auckland West electorate.

Dignan represented the Auckland West electorate in the House of Representatives from 1867 to 1870 when he was defeated, and from 1875 to 1879 when he resigned. He was appointed a member of the Legislative Council in 1879, until he died in 1894.

His eldest son, Peter Dignan, was Mayor of Auckland in 1897 and 1898.
