= List of public art in Kensington Gardens =

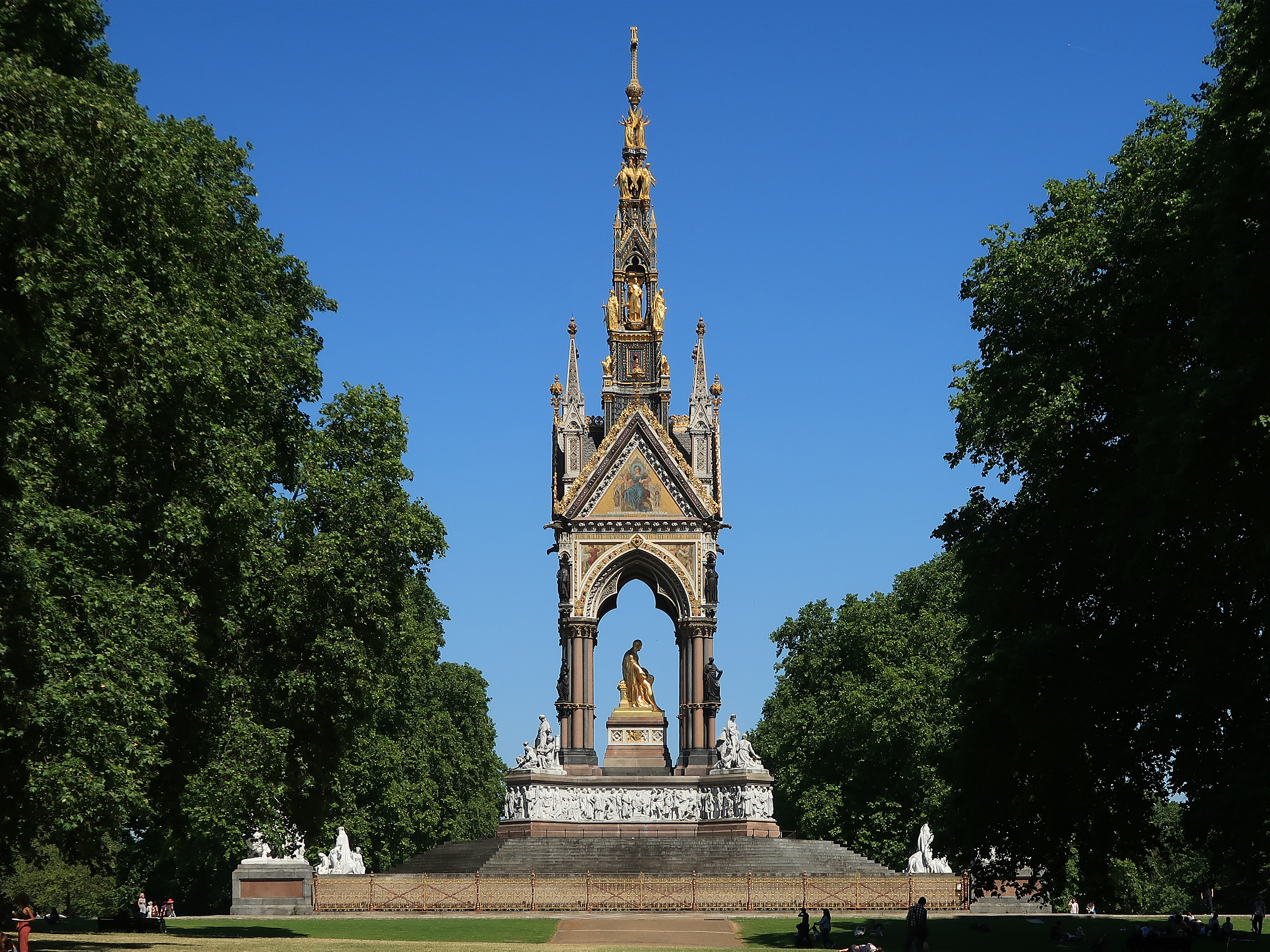
The Albert Memorial viewed from Kensington Gardens

This is a list of public art in Kensington Gardens, one of the Royal Parks of London.

When the contemporary sculptor Anish Kapoor held an exhibition of his work in the gardens in 2010 he remarked that they are "the best site in London for a piece of art, probably [the best] in the world".

== City of Westminster ==
Image	Title / subject	Location and coordinates	Date	Artist / designer	Architect / other	Type	Designation	Notes
More images	Coalbrookdale Gate	South Carriage Drive 51°30′08″N 0°10′29″W	1851	John Bell	Charles Crookes	Gates, cast iron	Grade II	Made in Coalbrookdale for the Great Exhibition of 1851. Installed at the entrance to Lancaster Walk in 1852 and moved to their present location in 1871, during construction of the Albert Memorial.
More images	Queen's Gate	Queen's Gate 51°30′06″N 0°10′49″W	1858	?	Charles James Richardson	Gates and piers, cast iron	Grade II*	The gatepiers may have borne sculptures of Hercules with the Lion and Hercules Carrying the Wild Boar before these were replaced by groups of does and fawns in 1919.
More images	Statue of Edward Jenner	Italian Gardens 51°30′38″N 0°10′31″W	1858	William Calder Marshall	John Thomas	Statue	Grade II	Unveiled by Prince Albert in Trafalgar Square in 1858. After pressure from anti-vaccinationists the statue was moved in 1862 to this site.
	Tazza fountain and flanking naiads	Italian Gardens	1861	John Thomas		Sculptures	Grade II	The four large marble basins of the fountain, in the form of scallop shells, are supported by bi-tailed mermen, and the two naiads are each accompanied by a swan.
	Reliefs of Queen Victoria, Prince Albert and the four seasons	Italian Gardens	1861	John Thomas		Reliefs	Grade II	Prince Albert was rumoured to have been the guiding mind behind the Italian Gardens, and similarities have been noted to the gardens he designed at Osborne.
More images	Speke Monument John Hanning Speke	Junction of Lancaster Walk and Budges Walk 51°30′32″N 0°10′45″W	1864	—N/a	Philip Hardwick	Obelisk	Grade II	A red granite obelisk, an appropriate form of commemoration for an explorer so associated with the River Nile. The pedestal inscribed IN MEMORY OF/ SPEKE/ VICTORIA NYANZA/ AND THE NILE/ 1864. The phrasing avoids crediting Speke with the discovery of the Nile's source, as this was a contentious point.
More images	Physical Energy	Junction of Lancaster Walk and several other walkways 51°30′24″N 0°10′42″W	1907 (installed)	George Frederic Watts	—N/a	Equestrian statue	Grade II	Installed 24 September 1907. Developed by Watts from his equestrian bronze Hugh Lupus (1870–1884) for the Duke of Westminster. Gifted to the nation on Watts's death in 1904, though the cast had not yet been made from the gesso model (now in the Watts Gallery). An earlier bronze cast was incorporated into the Rhodes Memorial (1906–1912) in Cape Town, South Africa.
More images	Statue of Peter Pan	West of the Long Water 51°30′31″N 0°10′34″W	1912	George Frampton	—N/a	Statue	Grade II*	Unveiled in secret on May Day 1912. The character's creator, J. M. Barrie, commissioned the sculpture and chose the site, which is Peter's landing point in the book Peter Pan in Kensington Gardens. Questions were raised in Parliament about the propriety of an author promoting his work in this way.
	Two groups of a doe and a faun	Gatepiers of Queen's Gate	1919	Pierre Louis Rouillard	Charles James Richardson	Sculptural groups	Grade II*	Gifts from Jean Louis Paul Lebègue, a French-born wine merchant who lived nearby on Collingham Road.
More images	Memorial to Esme Percy	Palace Gate 51°30′07″N 0°11′02″W	1961	Silvia Gilley	—N/a	Drinking fountain with sculpture	—N/a	A small bronze figure of a terrier on a platform rising from the centre of a shallow circular pool.
More images	Two Bears	Junction of North Flower Walk and Budges Walk, near the Italian Gardens 51°30′39″N 0°10′35″W	1970	?	—N/a	Drinking fountain with sculpture	—N/a	Statue of two embracing bears originally placed in 1939 to commemorate 80 years of the Metropolitan Drinking Fountain and Cattle Trough Association. The original was stolen but was replaced with a copy in 1970.
More images	St Govor's Well	Off the Broad Walk 51°30′12″N 0°11′04″W	1976	?	—N/a	Drinking fountain	—N/a	Inscribed: "This drinking fountain marks the site of an ancient spring, which in 1856 was named St Govor's Well by the First Commissioner of Works, later to become Lord Llanover. Saint Govor, a sixth-century hermit, was the patron saint of a church in Llanover which had eight wells in its churchyard." The spring's name also appears as "St Gover's Well". It was thought to have medicinal properties.
More images	The Arch 1979–1980	North bank of the Long Water 51°30′27″N 0°10′24″W	1979–1980	Henry Moore	—N/a	Sculpture	—N/a	Presented by Moore to the nation for installation in Kensington Gardens in 1980, two years after his 80th birthday exhibition in the nearby Serpentine Gallery. Dismantled in 1996 due to structural instability; re-erected in 2012.
	Memorial to Diana, Princess of Wales	Forecourt of the Serpentine Gallery 51°30′16″N 0°10′31″W	1997	Ian Hamilton Finlay	Peter Coates and Andrew Whittle (lettering)	Floor plaque, tree plaque and eight stone benches	—N/a	Pastoral poetry is inscribed on each element of the work. The plaque at the entrance of the gallery is inscribed with the names of trees found at Kensington Gardens and a quotation from the 18th-century philosopher Francis Hutcheson. Diana was a patron of the Serpentine Gallery.
	Trumpet (or the Tiffany Drinking Fountain)	Junction of the Broad Walk and Mount Walk 51°30′17″N 0°11′07″W	2012	—N/a	Ben Addy (of Moxon Architects)	Drinking fountain	—N/a	The winner, alongside Watering Holes in Green Park, of a RIBA-judged design competition; it was commended for its "formal clarity and elegance". Of the two designs this was thought to be the more "design-led" and Watering Holes the more "art-led".

=== Albert Memorial ===
Image	Title / subject	Location and coordinates	Date	Artist / designer	Architect / other	Type	Designation	Notes
More images	Frieze of Parnassus	Podium	1864–1872	Henry Hugh Armstead and John Birnie Philip	George Gilbert Scott	Relief sculpture	Grade I	Portrays 169 individual architects, composers, painters, poets, and sculptors from history.
More images	Europe	Front left (south-west) corner 51°30′08″N 0°10′41″W	1865–1871	Patrick MacDowell	George Gilbert Scott	Sculptural group	Grade I	Europa, seated on a bull, carries an orb and sceptre signifying her continent's imperial dominance in the nineteenth century. Around her sit Britannia with a trident, France with a sword and laurel wreath, Germany with an open book and Italy with a lyre and palette.
More images	Asia	Front right (south-east) corner 51°30′08″N 0°10′39″W	1865–1871	John Henry Foley	George Gilbert Scott	Sculptural group	Grade I	A personification of the continent, seated on an Indian elephant, removes a veil to reveal herself. Flanking her are an Indian soldier, a Persian poet, a Chinese potter and a Turkish merchant.
More images	Africa	Rear right (north-east) corner 51°30′09″N 0°10′39″W	1865–1871	William Theed	George Gilbert Scott	Sculptural group	Grade I	A figure in Egyptian costume, representing the continent, rests on a camel. Beside her are an Arabian merchant, a figure sometimes identified as a Nubian, a female European and a tribesman.
More images	America	Rear left (north-west) corner 51°30′09″N 0°10′41″W	1865–1871	John Bell	George Gilbert Scott	Sculptural group	Grade I	The personification of America rides a bison charging forward, guided by the sceptre of the United States, identified by her starry sash. The other figures represent Canada, Mexico and South America.
More images	Agriculture	Atop the front left (south-west) extension of the podium	1865–1871	William Calder Marshall	George Gilbert Scott	Sculptural group	Grade I	A husbandman, flanked on either side by figures representing livestock farming (a shepherd boy with a lamb and an ewe) and cereal production, looks up to a female personification of Agriculture.
More images	Manufactures	Atop the front right (south-east) extension of the podium	1865–1871	Henry Weekes	George Gilbert Scott	Sculptural group	Grade I	A female personification of manufactures, accompanied by a blacksmith, looks down on two child labourers, one a factory girl and the other a young potter, representing art manufactures.
More images	Commerce	Atop the rear right (north-east) extension of the podium	1865–1871	Thomas Thornycroft	George Gilbert Scott	Sculptural group	Grade I	The group consists of Commerce, bearing a cornucopia, a young merchant in "Anglo-Saxon" dress (said to be modelled on the sculptor's son Hamo), an Eastern merchant and a rustic with a sack of corn.
More images	Engineering	Atop the rear left (north-west) extension of the podium	1865–1871	John Lawlor	George Gilbert Scott	Sculptural group	Grade I	The presiding genius of engineering directs three workers: an engineer with plan in hand, a mechanical engineer with a cogwheel, and a navvy. The two bridges over the Menai Strait are represented at the back of the group.
More images	Mosaics	Tympana, spandrels and vault of the canopy	1866–1868	John Richard Clayton with Salviati and Co.	George Gilbert Scott	Mosaics	Grade I	The enthroned female figures in the tympana are identified by their inscriptions as Pictura, Poesis, Sculptura and Architectura; the last displays the design of the Albert Memorial itself.
	Virtues	Flèche	1867–1870	James Redfern	George Gilbert Scott	Statues	Grade I	Personifications of the seven virtues along with an eighth, Humanity. Redfern's plaster models were electroformed in copper by Francis Skidmore's ironworking firm in Coventry. The resulting figures were gilded after being mounted on the memorial.
	Practical Arts and Sciences	Corners of the canopy	c. 1868	Henry Hugh Armstead and John Birnie Philip	George Gilbert Scott	Statues	Grade I	In niches on a level with the spandrels are Armstead's Rhetoric and Medicine and Philip's Philosophy and Physiology. Below them, standing on column shafts, are Philip's Geometry and Geology and Armstead's Astronomy and Chemistry.
	Angels	Flèche		John Birnie Philip	George Gilbert Scott	Statues	Grade I	One of the eight angels is a replica of 1955, replacing a figure badly damaged in an air raid on the night of 1–2 October 1940, when the memorial's bronze cross and orb were shot off.
More images	Statue of Albert, Prince Consort	Beneath the canopy 51°30′09″N 0°10′39″W	1871–1876	John Henry Foley and Thomas Brock	George Gilbert Scott	Statue	Grade I	Foley was given the commission in 1868 after the death of Carlo Marochetti. Working in the open on the model gave Foley the sickness which ultimately killed him in 1874, and the work was completed by his pupil Brock.

== Royal Borough of Kensington and Chelsea ==
Image	Title / subject	Location and coordinates	Date	Artist / designer	Architect / other	Type	Designation	Notes
More images	Elfin Oak	Near the entrance of the Diana, Princess of Wales Memorial Playground 51.5087°N 0.1880°W	1930	Ivor Innes	—N/a	Sculptures	Grade II	A gnarled oak tree stump adorned with 74 painted fairy figures and animal forms; restored in 1950, 1964–1966 (by Spike Milligan), 1985 and 1997.

=== Kensington Palace ===
Image	Title / subject	Location and coordinates	Date	Artist / designer	Architect / other	Type	Designation	Notes
	Lion and Unicorn	Entrance to Kensington Palace, off Kensington Road 51.5026°N 0.1876°W	Probably 18th century	?	—N/a	Statues	Grade II	
More images	Statue of Queen Victoria	Broad Walk 51.5054°N 0.1861°W	1893	Princess Louise, Duchess of Argyll	James Houghton (sculptor of the pedestal)	Statue	Grade II	Sculpted by the Queen's daughter, the statue portrays Victoria aged 19 and wearing her coronation robes. The statue was a gift from the Kensington Golden Jubilee Memorial Executive Committee.
More images	Statue of William III	Flower Walk 51.5046°N 0.1874°W	1907	Heinrich Baucke	Aston Webb; William Silver Frith (carving on the pedestal)	Statue	Grade II	A gift from Kaiser Wilhelm II to his uncle Edward VII, cast from a statue the Kaiser had erected on the terrace of the Berlin Palace.
More images	Statue of Diana, Princess of Wales	Sunken Garden	2017	Ian Rank-Broadley	—N/a	Sculptural group	—N/a	Unveiled 1 July 2021, which would have been Diana's 60th birthday, by her sons Princes William and Harry, who commissioned the work.

== See also ==
- List of public art in Hyde Park, London
- List of public art in Kensington

== Bibliography ==
- Brooks, Chris, ed. (2000). The Albert Memorial: The Prince Consort National Memorial: Its History, Contexts and Conservation. London and New Haven: Yale University Press.
- Cavanagh, Terry (2023). Public Sculpture of Kensington and Chelsea with Westminster South-West. Public Sculpture of Britain. Vol. 22. Watford: Public Statues and Sculpture Association. ISBN 978-1-8383976-2-3.
- Forder, Helen (2012). High Hats and Harps: The Life and Times of Lord and Lady Llanover. Tonypandy: TallyBerry.
