= Halse =

Halse may refer to:

== Placenames ==
- Halse, Northamptonshire, a hamlet near Brackley, Northamptonshire, England
- Halse, Norway, a neighborhood in the town of Mandal in Lindesnes Municipality, Agder county, Norway
- Halse, Somerset, is a village near Taunton in Somerset, England

== Other uses ==
- Halse (name)
- Halse Hall, Plantation great house in Clarendon, Jamaica - the oldest English building in Jamaica which is still used as a residence

== See also ==
- Woodford Halse, a large village in Northamptonshire, England
