= Halse (name) =

Halse is both a surname and a given name. Notable people with the name include:

Surname:

- Arne Halse (1887–1975), Norwegian athlete who specialized in the different forms of javelin throw
- Clive Halse (1935–2002), South African cricketer
- Emmeline Halse (1853–1930), English sculptor
- George Halse (1826–1895), English sculptor and poet
- Harold Halse (1886–1949), English soccer player who played most of his career for Manchester United
- Kristian Halse (born 1926), Norwegian politician for the Liberal Party
- Laurie Halse Anderson (born Laurie Beth Halse, 1961), American author
- Sir Nicholas Halse (died 1636), Governor of Pendennis Castle in Cornwall, England
- Sir Reginald Halse (1881–1962), Archbishop of Brisbane

Given name:

- Halse Rogers Arnott (1879–1961), Australian medical practitioner, company director and chairman of Arnott's
- Percival Halse Rogers (1883–1945), Australian jurist and university chancellor
