= Statue of Edward Jenner, London =

Statue in Kensington Gardens, London

Coordinates: 51.510576°N 0.175121°W

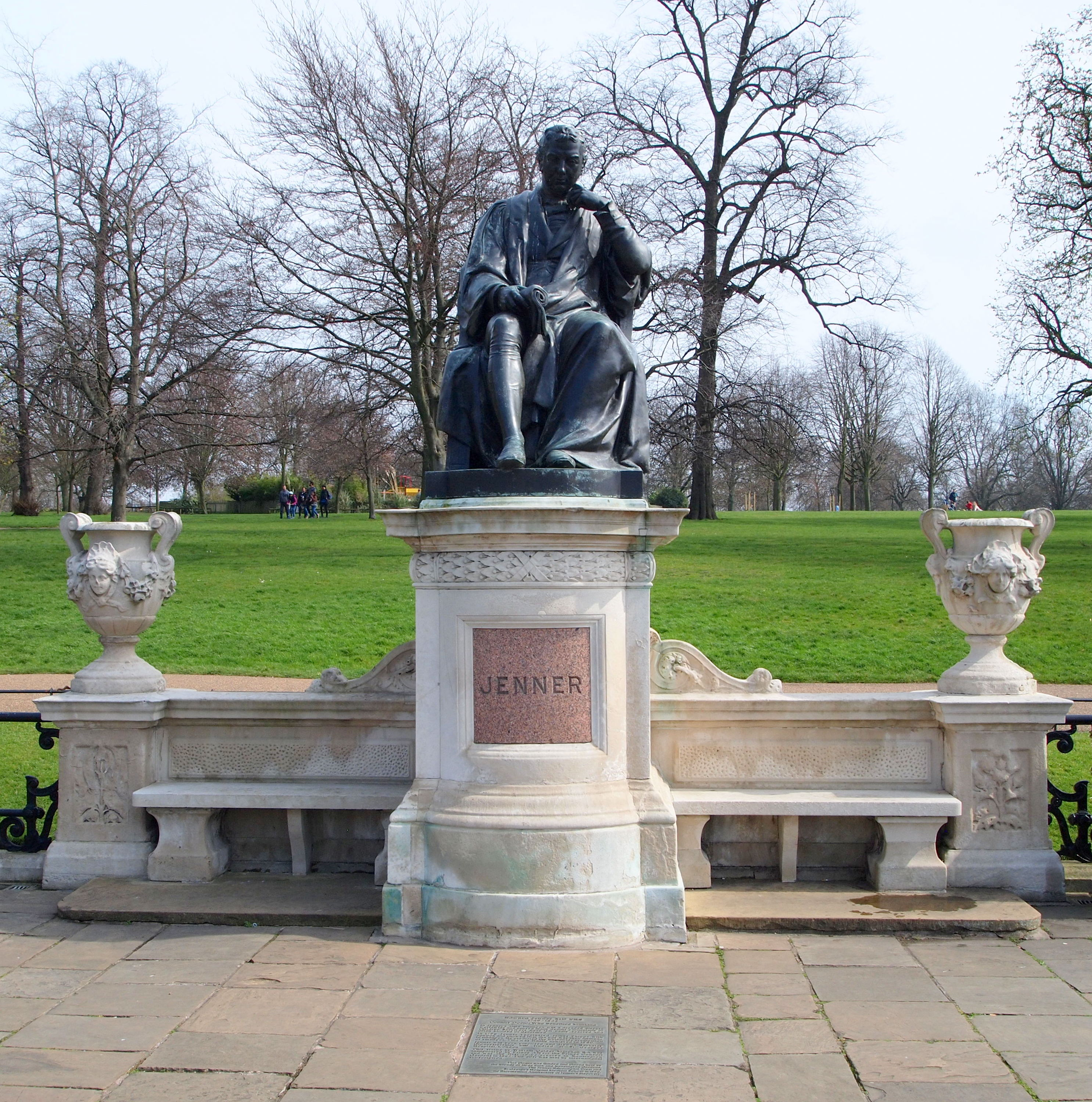
The statue in 2016

A statue of Edward Jenner, the physician, scientist and pioneer of the world's first vaccine, is located in Kensington Gardens in London. A work of the sculptor William Calder Marshall, the bronze was originally unveiled by Prince Albert in Trafalgar Square on 17 May 1858, before being moved to its present location in 1862. It is a Grade II listed building.

The statue shows Jenner in a seated position with one hand holding papers, and is set upon a plinth of Portland stone with Jenner's surname inscribed on a panel of Aberdeen granite at the front. At the base of the plinth is the inscription 'W. Calder Marshall, R. A. Sculpt. 1858'. A descriptive bronze plaque is set into the ground in front of the statue and it reads:

Edward Jenner, MD, FRS, 1749–1823, country doctor who benefited mankind.

In Jenner's time smallpox was a dreaded disease worldwide and caused many deaths particularly of children. Survivors were left badly scarred and often blinded or deformed. In 1796 Jenner vaccinated James Phipps with cowpox and showed that the boy was then immune to smallpox. He predicted the worldwide eradication of smallpox. This was finally achieved in 1980. Jenner was born, practised and died in Berkeley, Gloucestershire and studied at St. George's Hospital, London.

This statue by William Calder Marshall RA was inaugurated by Prince Albert, the Prince Consort, and was the first to be erected in Kensington Gardens in 1862. The cost was met by international subscription.

In 1853, the year that United Kingdom legislated for compulsory vaccination, the sculptor Calder Marshall gained attention from the medical community for his bust of Jenner which was shown at the Great Exhibition in 1851, and a public fund to establish a London memorial was launched. International donations were generous, but the British public were less supportive, and Caldwell Marshall was left "seriously out of pocket". Despite this, the finished statue, unveiled by Queen Victoria's consort, Prince Albert, was a "triumph for the vaccinationist cause".

The prominent memorial was opposed by anti-vaccinationists, but even more strongly by the military, as Trafalgar Square, in 1858, only included statues of notable military figures. As a newspaper at the time noted, "the veterans of the Horse Guards and Admiralty were scandalised at the idea of a mere civilian, a doctor, having a place in such distinguished company, and moreover daring to be seated while his betters were standing".

Despite calls by The Times, and in Parliament, for Jenner's statue to be moved, with royal support it remained in place until two months after the death of the Prince Consort in December 1861. In 1862, the physician Frederick William Headland compared the military statues to Jenner's, and noted that they remained in Trafalgar Square "because they killed their fellow-creatures, whereas he only saved them". A proposal to return the statue to a more prominent location was made in a letter to The Times in 1923, and again in 1937. In 2010, the 30th anniversary of the eradication of smallpox that began with Jenner's vaccine, a new campaign to return the statue to Trafalgar Square began.

== See also ==
- List of public art in Kensington Gardens
