= Aloysius O'Kelly =

Irish artist

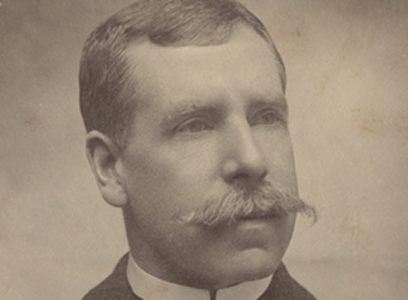
- Aloysius O'Kelly
- Born: 3 July 1853; Dublin, Ireland
- Died: 12 January 1936 (aged 82); Poughkeepsie, New York
- Education: École des Beaux-Arts, Paris
- Known for: Painter, sculptor
- Movement: Orientalist

Aloysius O'Kelly (3 July 1853 – 12 January 1936) was an Irish painter.

== Early life ==
Aloysius was born to John and Bridget O'Kelly in Peterson's Lane (now Lombard Street East), Dublin, 3 July 1853. He was the youngest of four boys and one girl. The O'Kelly family along with Aloysius' cousins, the Lawlors, made up a network of artists and political activists in 19th-century Irish cultural history. His grandparents on his father's side were natives of County Roscommon and his father ran a blacksmith's shop and dray making business in Peterson's Lane. His uncle on his mother's side was John Lawlor, a successful sculptor, and his cousin, Michael Lawlor, was also a sculptor employed in London. Aloysius' brothers, Charles and Stephen, also became artists, whereas the eldest brother, James J. O'Kelly, set forth on a successful political career. O'Kelly's mother directed him towards a career in the arts.

In 1861, John's father died and Bridget, whose brother, John Lawlor (1820-1901) was already an established sculptor in London. moved her family there. Lawlor became a father figure to her children, especially her sons. Lawlor took on the boys, including Aloysius, as apprentices in his studio.

== Career ==
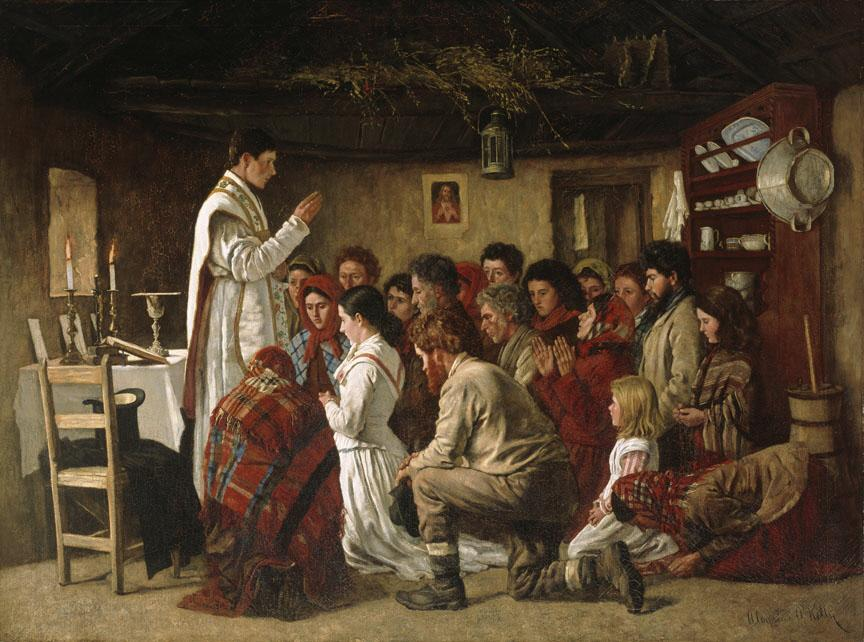
Mass in a Connemara Cabin by Aloysius O'Kelly, 1883

O'Kelly traveled to Paris in order to enroll at the École des Beaux-Arts in 1874, where he studied under Bonnat and Gérôme. To enter the Gérôme's atelier was a great honour, however, the master was exceedingly strict and merciless in his criticism; such that a number of students could not last the distance. It is uncertain whether O'Kelly ever matriculated.

From Gérôme, O'Kelly developed an interest in Oriental scenes. He traveled to Brittany in 1876, painting its aesthetic coastlines, fishing ports and villages.

In October 1881, Charles Stewart Parnell, a member of Parliament and leader of the Irish Party, was arrested and imprisoned in Kilmainham. Two days following his arrest, Aloysius' brother, James J. O'Kelly, along with some other Party members, including John Dillon, were imprisoned where they remained until May 1882. A number of Aloysius' drawings during this period portrayed the political situation dealing with his brother's incarceration.

Aloysius inevitably became embroiled in the murky and often secretive life of his brother. He began to paint and sketch political activists including members of the Land League.

O'Kelly lived in Concarneau, Connemara and eventually the United States, painting rural scenes in the prior and city life in New York City. In 1889, O'Kelly painted a depiction of Huckleberry Finn for Mark Twain.

He died on 12 January 1936 in Poughkeepsie, New York.

== Work ==
Selected works

- Kitchen, West of Ireland, 1870s
- A Load of Turf, Connemarre, 1870s
- Opening of the New Irish Land Court in Connaught, 1881
- The State of Ireland- Tilling the Farm of an Imprisoned Land Leaguer, 1881
- An Eviction in the West of Ireland, 1881
- The Irish Land League: Recreation time in the Kilmainham Prison, 1881
- Distress in Ireland: Waiting for Relief Outside the Priest's House in Kilronan, 1886
- Edmund O'Donovan as an Oriental, date unknown

== See also ==
- List of Orientalist artists
- Orientalism
