= George Halse =

Sculptor, novelist and poet (1826–1895)

George Halse (1 May 1826 – December 1895) was an English sculptor, novelist, and poet.

== Early life ==
Halse was the son of John Halse, a state page at St. James's Palace, and Clarissa Fenwick. He gained the patronage of William IV for his son George, with the result that the latter was admitted to St Paul's School in 1833 at the request of the monarch. Plans for studying for the church were frustrated by William IV's death and George's schooling ended in 1841. He joined Drummond's Bank at Charing Cross in December 1846 and worked there until his death in 1895. In 1849 George Halse married Matilda Davis, and they had four children. Emmeline, their third child, also became a sculptor. The family moved to a new house on the Ladbrooke Estate in Notting Hill Gate in 1865 at 15, Clarendon Road where a purpose built studio was constructed.

== Artistic interests ==
Despite Halse's career at the bank, where he eventually became Chief Clerk (or manager) in 1891, he was a prolific sculptor, producing about ninety works. He also published novels, verse romances, occasional poems and a manual of sculpture, A Guide to Modelling, which went into many editions and was still in print c.1920. His verse romance Sir Guy de Guy was a collaboration with his friend, Hablot Knight Browne (1815–1882) better known as Phiz and for his work illustrating Charles Dickens' novels. From 1857 until the early 1890s George exhibited regularly at the Royal Academy, the British Institution, and also at the Royal Hibernian Academy, Manchester City Art Gallery, the Royal Scottish Academy and the Royal Glasgow Institute of the Fine Arts.

== Style ==
His style was idealised, his subject matter was drawn from the classics, scripture and poetry. He made portrait busts of the famous and some heroic statues, but most of his work was more domestic in nature being studies of women and children, often suggesting a story to be told and occasionally veering towards the sentimental. Some of his work shown at the Royal Academy was reproduced in Parian Ware, and others were designed specifically for William Taylor Copeland's Parian or 'Statuary Porcelain'.

One of Halse's few works of public sculpture was a marble group Advance Australia. This was shown at the Royal Academy Summer Exhibition in 1865 and merited a full-page engraving and review in The Art Journal of 1866. It shows Britannia and Australia as mother and daughter flanked by a kangaroo. The reviewer commented: 'Britannia [is] in the act of unveiling the virgin beauties of Australia, who, surprised and pleased, boldly steps out from her native wilds, into the clear open space of civilisation.' Halse's group was made at about the same time as the Albert Memorial (1863–72), and makes an interesting comparison because his work emphasises the familial caring relationship of Empire. By contrast the Albert Memorial suggests Britain's power over the four continents, or the four corners of the earth, which are literally at the four corners of the monument. At this date there was vigorous debate about whether Australia qualified as a fifth continent. Halse's composition seems to contribute to this discussion.

== Child studies ==
Halse's many child studies take the form of busts of children laughing or crying, or statues of young girls playing with babies. Often the children are wreathed in flowers suggesting the ephemeral nature of childhood, both through the high infant mortality of the time but also the natural process of maturation. These figure groups were frequently reproduced as engravings in The Illustrated London News indicating their popularity. Older children were also subjects. For example, Young England, exhibited at the RA in 1870 is of a boy holding a cricket bat and reading a book. A review in The Illustrated London News comments on its 'muscularly inclined Christianity' linking it to Thomas Arnold's ideas on combining physical and moral education. Halse seemed to go along with these theories, as he set out his vision for youth in his poem The Legend of Sir Juvenis dedicated to the boys of St. Paul's school. The hero of the poem overcomes many trials with the help of knowledge, his aim being to gain the moral quality of true manliness. In the following year Halse made a companion sculpture of a girl holding a sketch pad, the title Young England's Sister makes clear its relationship to Young England but at the same time the title reverses Halse's laudable attempt at equality. Both statues were reproduced by W.T Copeland in Parian ware.

1866 was an important year for Halse because he was commissioned to design part of Copeland's dessert service for the Prince and Princess of Wales. He modelled four female figures supporting fruit dishes (or compotes) and representing the four elements 'Earth, Air, Fire and Water'. The service is in the Royal Collection at Sandringham House but at present Halse's contributions are not on public display because they are damaged. The figures are amongst his most successful showing a gentle lyricism and a light touch. His Trysting Tree Boy and the companion girl also made for Copeland share the charm and lightness of the elemental figures.

== Death ==
Halse died in 1895 having achieved thirty-nine years at the Bank instead of the forty which had been his intention. On 23 December 1895 George J. Drummond wrote to all his colleagues that they had lost 'a loyal, amiable and invaluable colleague' and that he might have lived longer had he not driven himself so hard, but that 'the path of duty to a man of his active mind and temperament was probably preferable to a well earned life of ease and retirement.'

== List of published works ==
- Halse, George. Queen Loeta and the Mistletoe: A Fairy Rhyme for the Fireside. London: Addey, 1857
- Halse, George. Pastoral and Other Poems. London: Harrison, 1859
- Halse, George. Agatha: A Fanciful Flight for a Gusty Night. London: Harrison, 1861.
- Eassie, William, George Halse, and Hablot Knight Browne. Sir Guy De Guy: A Stirring Romaunt : Showing How a Briton Drilled for His Fatherland, Won a Heiress, Got a Pedigree, and Caught the Rheumatism. London: Routledge, Warne, and Routledge, 1864
- Halse, George. The Modeller: A Guide to the Principles and Practice of Sculpture for the Use of Students and Amateurs. London: Rowney, 1880.
- Halse, George. A Salad of Stray Leaves. London: Longmans, Green, 1882
- Halse, George. Weeping Ferry: A Novel. London, Hurst and Blackett, 1887
- Halse, George. Graham Aspen, Painter: A Novel. London: Hurst and Blackett, 1889
