= Albert Memorial =

Memorial to Prince Albert in Kensington Gardens, London

- Consort Prince Memorial
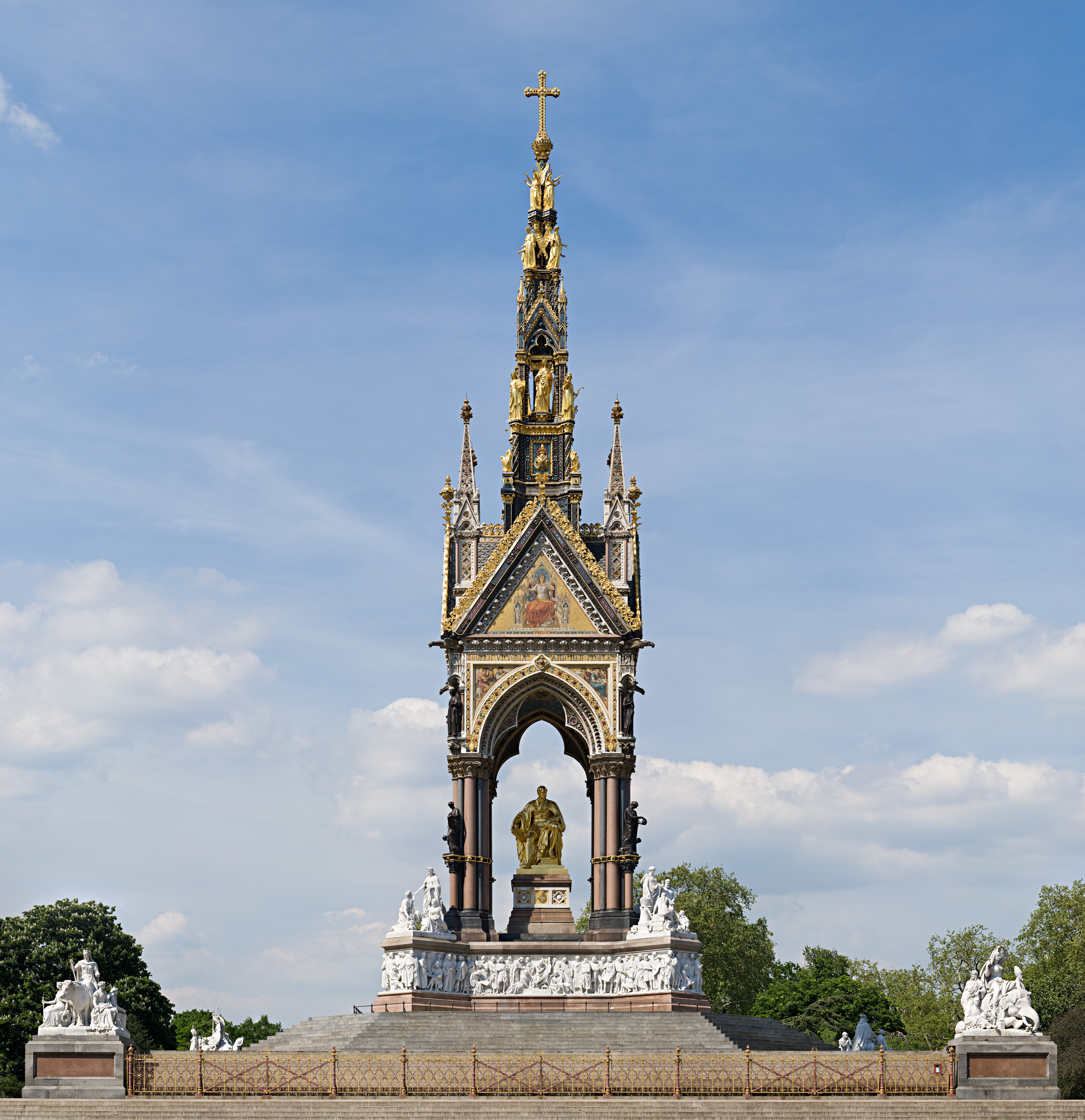
- The Albert Memorial from the south side
- Interactive map of Albert Memorial
- Location: London, W2
- Coordinates: 51°30′09″N 0°10′40″W

The Albert Memorial is a Gothic Revival ciborium in Kensington Gardens, London, designed and dedicated to the memory of Prince Albert of Great Britain. Located directly north of the Royal Albert Hall, it was commissioned by Queen Victoria in memory of her husband, who died in 1861. Designed by Sir George Gilbert Scott, it takes the form of an ornate canopy or pavilion 176 feet (54 m) tall over the high altar of a church, sheltering a statue of the prince facing south. It took over ten years to complete, the £120,000 cost (the equivalent of about £15,000,000 in 2025) met by public subscription.

The memorial was opened in July 1872 by Queen Victoria, with the statue of Albert ceremonially "seated" in 1876. It has been Grade I listed since 1970.

== Commission and design ==
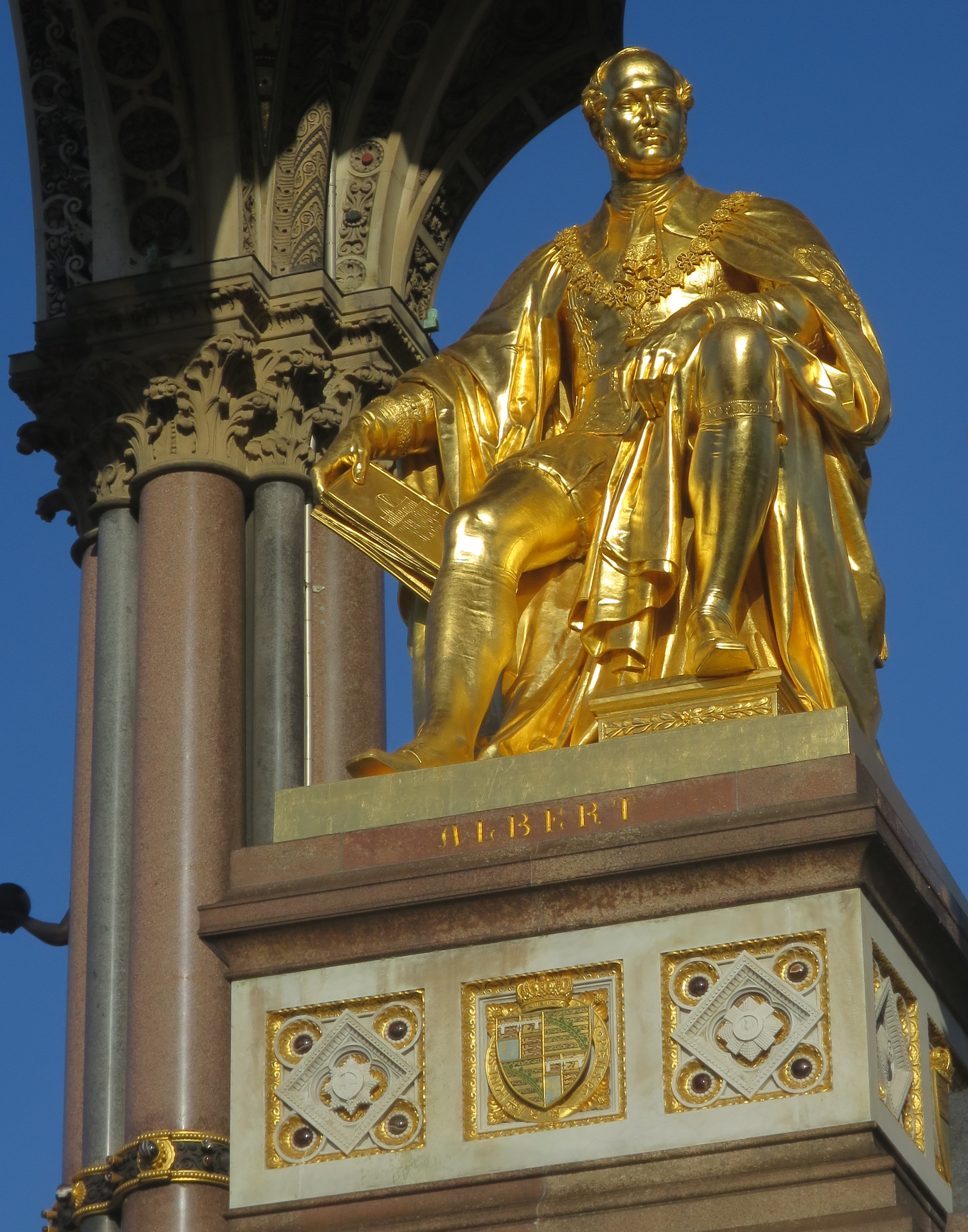
The memorial statue of Albert, by John Henry Foley and Thomas Brock

Audio description of the memorial by Joely Richardson

When Prince Albert died on 14 December 1861, at the age of 42, the thoughts of those in government and public life turned to the form and shape of a suitable memorial, with several possibilities, such as establishing a university or international scholarships, being mentioned. Queen Victoria, however, soon made it clear that she desired a memorial "in the common sense of the word". The initiative was taken by the Lord Mayor of London, William Cubitt, who, at a meeting on 14 January 1862, appointed a committee to raise funds for a design to be approved by the Queen. The control and future course of the project, though, moved away from Mansion House, and ended up being controlled by people close to the Queen, rather than the Lord Mayor. Those who determined the overall direction from that point on were the Queen's secretary, General Charles Grey, and the keeper of the privy purse, Sir Charles Phipps. His assistant Doyne Bell was secretary of the committee and later published The National Memorial to His Royal Highness the Prince Consort (1873).

Following the deaths of Grey and Phipps, their roles were taken on by Sir Henry Ponsonby and Sir Thomas Biddulph. Eventually, a four-man Prince Consort Memorial Committee was established, led by Sir Charles Lock Eastlake and consisting of him, Cubitt, the 14th Earl of Derby, and the 4th Earl of Clarendon. Eastlake had overall control for the project until his death in 1865. An initial proposal for an obelisk failed, and this was followed in May 1862 by the appointment of a seven-strong committee of architects. A range of designs were submitted and examined. Two of these (by Philip Charles Hardwick and George Gilbert Scott) were passed to the Queen in February 1863 for a final decision to be made. Two months later, after lengthy deliberations and negotiations with the government over the costs of the memorial, Scott's design was formally approved in April 1863.

== Architectural influences ==
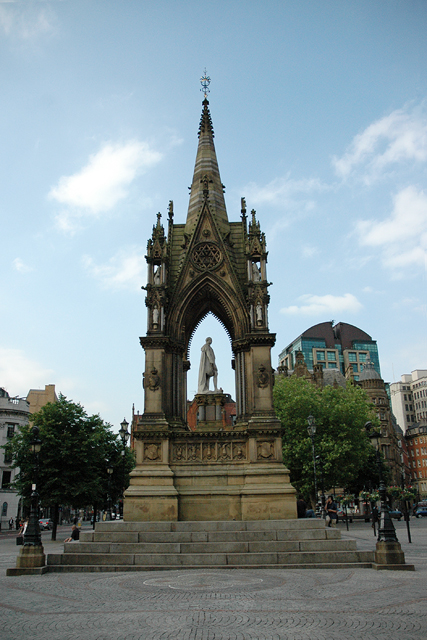
The Albert Memorial, Manchester (Thomas Worthington and Matthew Noble, 1865)

The popularity of the Prince Consort led to the creation of several "Albert Memorials" around the United Kingdom. The Kensington memorial was not the earliest; the first memorial depicting the Prince to be erected was Thomas Worthington's Albert Memorial in Albert Square, Manchester, unveiled in 1865. Both memorials present the figure of Prince Albert enclosed within a Gothic ciborium, and the similarities of design have been remarked on. (The earliest memorial to be erected was the Prince Albert Memorial in Swanage, in 1862, in the form of an obelisk.)

There is some controversy as to whether the memorial in Manchester was influenced by the publication of Scott's design, or whether Scott was himself inspired by Worthington's design, or whether both architects decided on their canopy designs independently.

Worthington's design was published in The Builder on 27 September 1862, before Scott's final design was unveiled. However, writing in his Recollections, Gilbert Scott suggested his own design was original:

My idea in designing the Memorial was to erect a kind of ciborium to protect a statue of the Prince; and its special characteristic was that the ciborium was designed in some degree on the principles of the ancient shrines. These shrines were models of imaginary buildings, such as had never in reality been erected; and my idea was to realise one of these imaginary structures with its precious materials, its inlaying, its enamels, etc. etc. ... this was an idea so new as to provoke much opposition.

The Albert Memorial was not the first revivalist design for a canopied statue in a Gothic style – the Scott Monument in Edinburgh had been designed by George Meikle Kemp over twenty years earlier, and may itself have influenced Worthington's designs for Manchester.

== Statue of Albert ==
The commission to make the seated figure of Prince Albert for the memorial was initially given to Baron Carlo Marochetti, a favourite sculptor of Queen Victoria. However, his first version was rejected by the architect of the monument, Sir George Gilbert Scott, and Marochetti died in late 1867, before a satisfactory second version could be completed. In May 1868, John Henry Foley, sculptor of the monument's Asia group, was commissioned to make the portrait, and his sketch model approved in December of that year. A full-sized model was placed on the monument in 1870, and the design approved by the Queen. The final statue was cast in bronze by Henry Prince and Company, of Southwark; Foley died in August 1874 before casting was complete.

The gilt bronze statue was ceremonially "seated" in 1875, three years after the memorial opened. Albert is shown looking south, towards the Royal Albert Hall. He is robed as a Knight of the Garter, and holds a catalogue of the Great Exhibition, which was located nearby in Hyde Park.

== Frieze of Parnassus ==
The central part of the memorial is surrounded by the elaborate sculptural Frieze of Parnassus (named after Mount Parnassus, the favorite resting place for the Greek muses), which depicts 169 individual composers, architects, poets, painters, and sculptors. Musicians and poets were placed on the south side, painters on the east side, sculptors on the west side, and architects on the north side. Henry Hugh Armstead carved the figures on the south and east side, the painters, musicians and poets (80 in total), and grouped them by national schools. John Birnie Philip carved the figures on the west and north side, the sculptors and architects, and arranged them in chronological order.

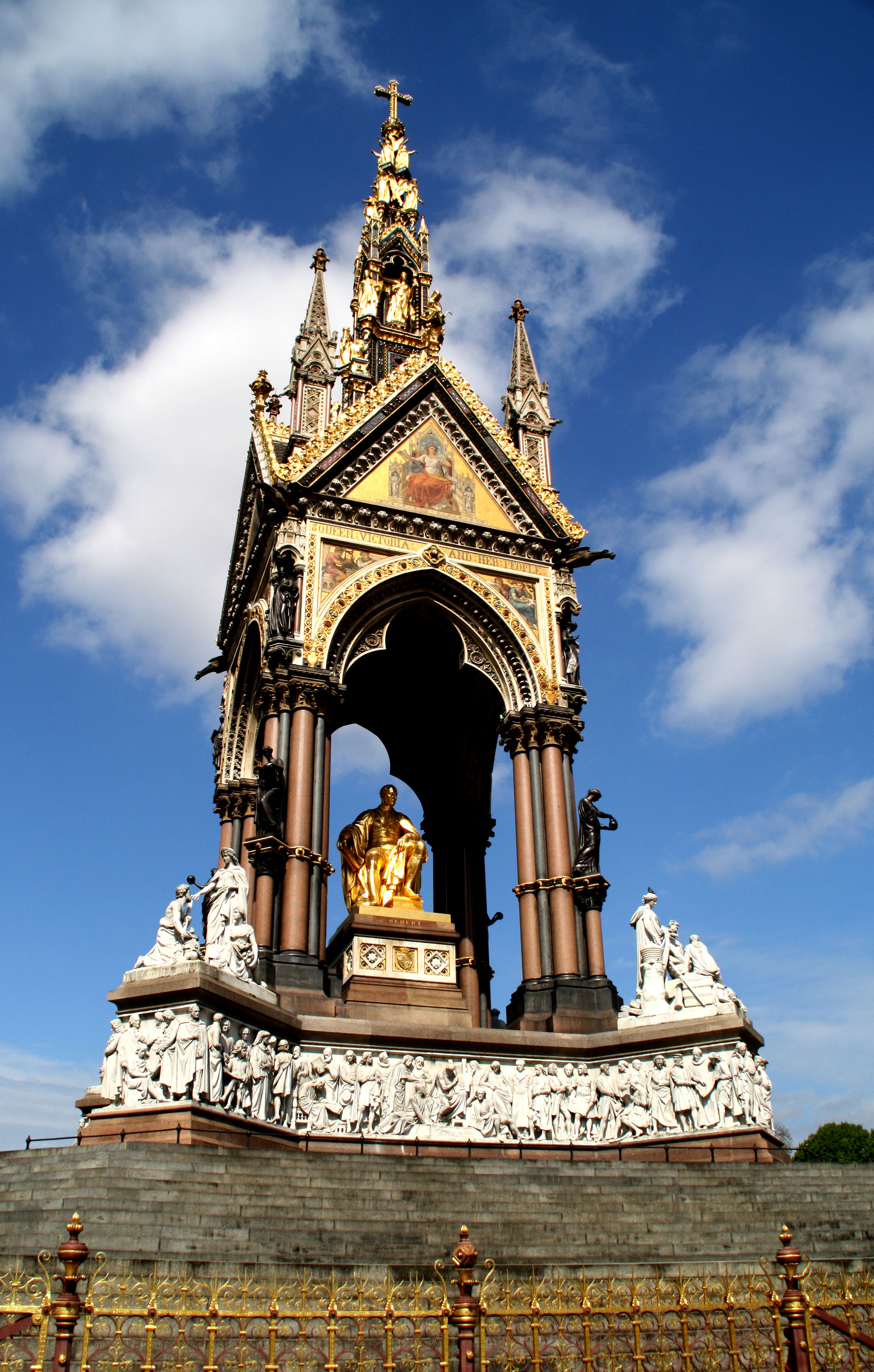
The Frieze of Parnassus — sculpted tribute to poets, painters, and philosophers adorning the base of the memorial statue of Albert.

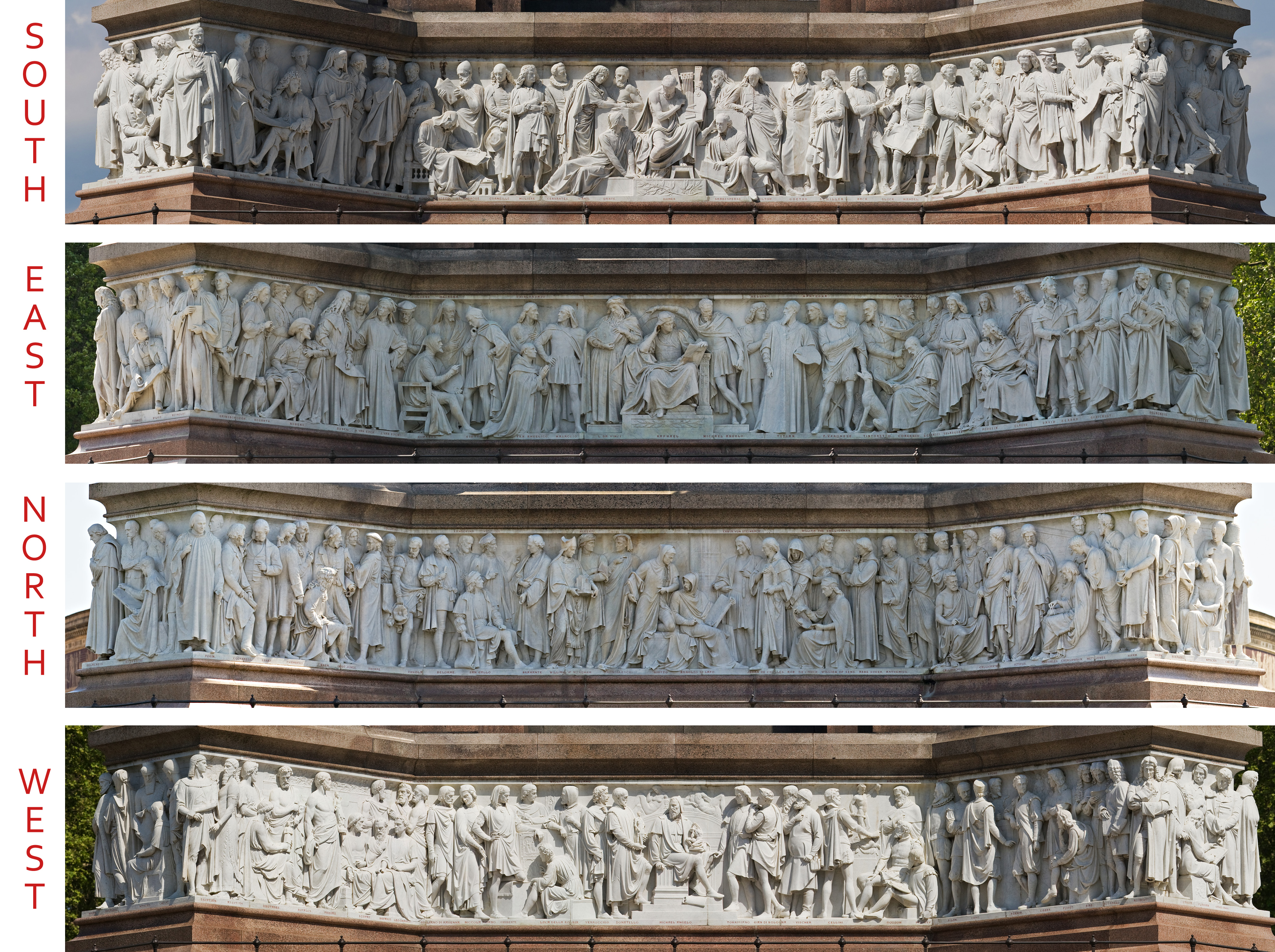
Composite view of the four sides.

== Allegorical sculptures ==
At the corners of the central area, and at the corners of the outer area, there are two programmes of allegorical sculpture, or at least sculptures of personifications: four groups depicting Victorian industrial arts and sciences (agriculture, commerce, engineering and manufacturing), and four more groups representing the traditional four continents: Africa, the Americas, Asia and Europe at the four corners, each continent-group including several ethnographic figures and a large animal: A camel for Africa, a bison for the Americas, an elephant for Asia and a bull for Europe. These groups represent something of a blend of traditional iconography for the continents personified, and an attempt to update them.

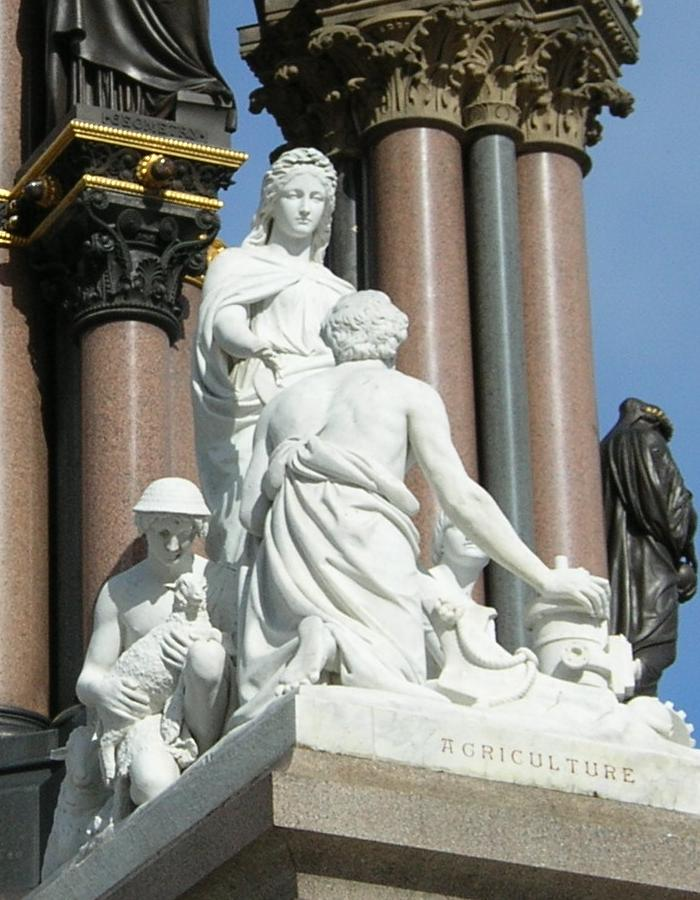
"Agriculture" group
by William Calder Marshall

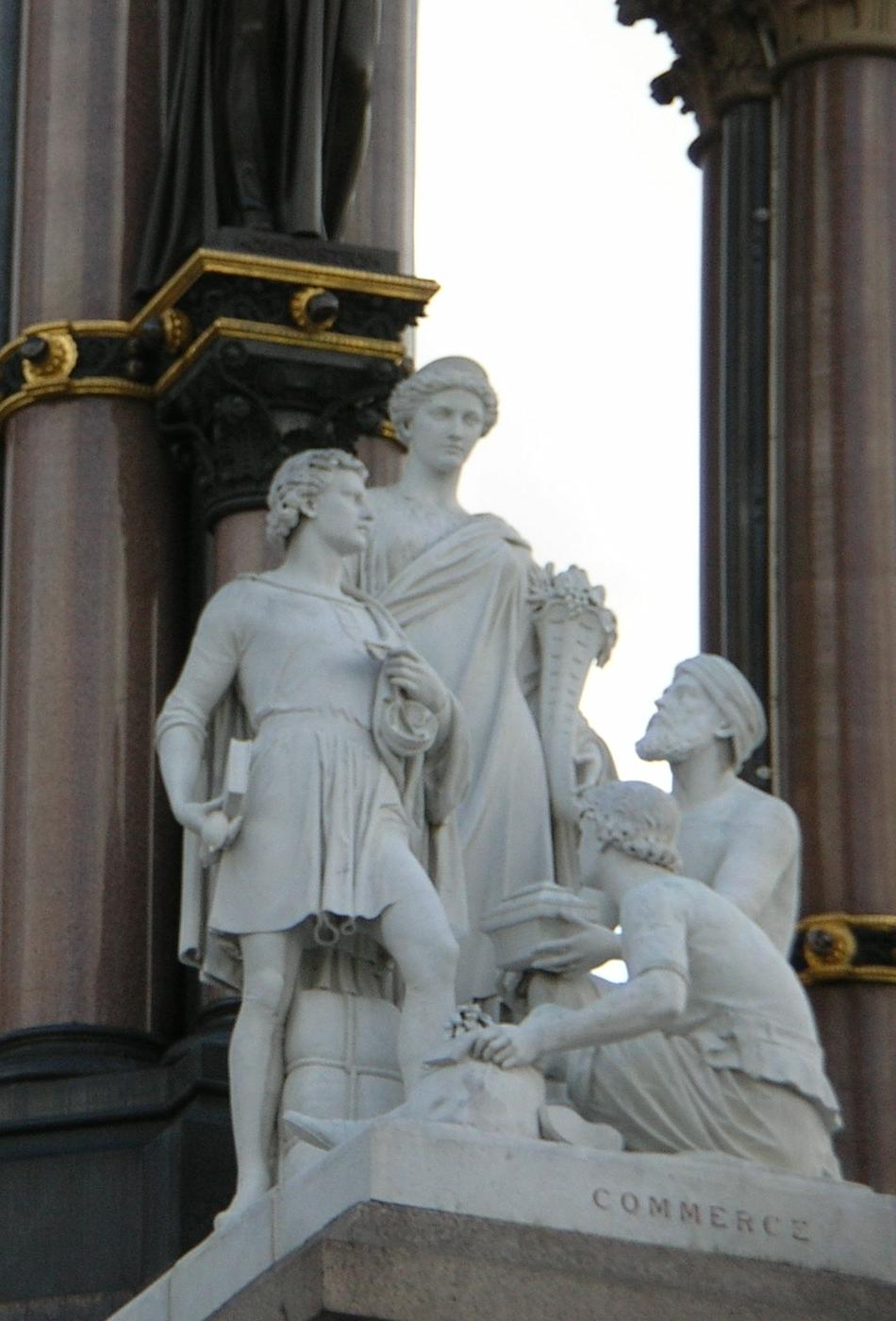
"Commerce" group
by Thomas Thornycroft

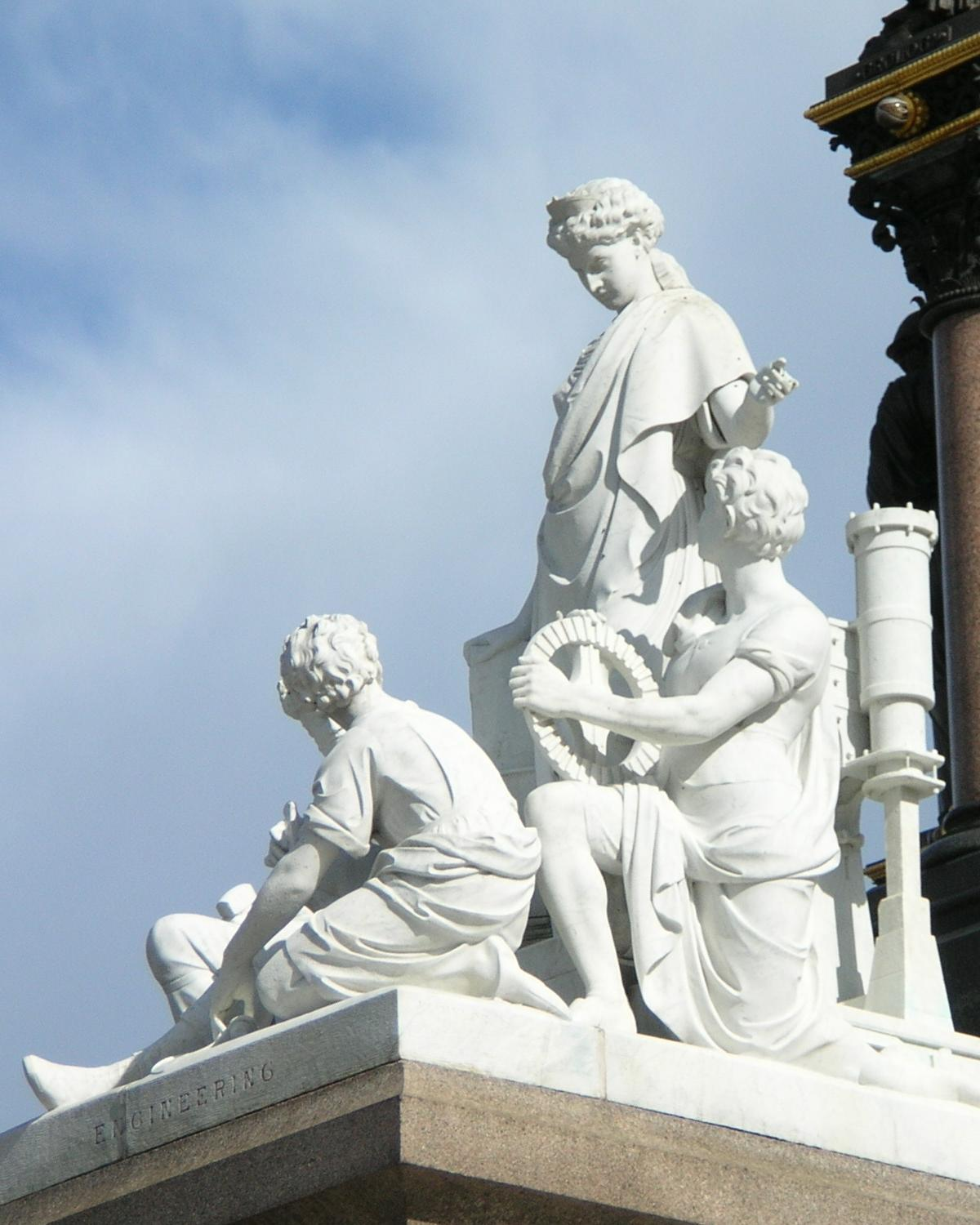
"Engineering" group
by John Lawlor

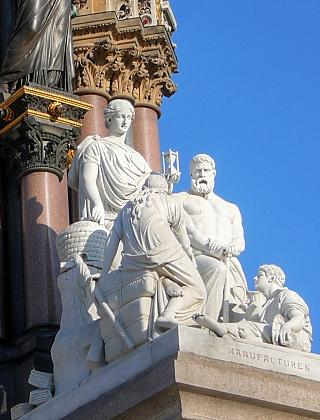
"Manufactures" group
by Henry Weekes

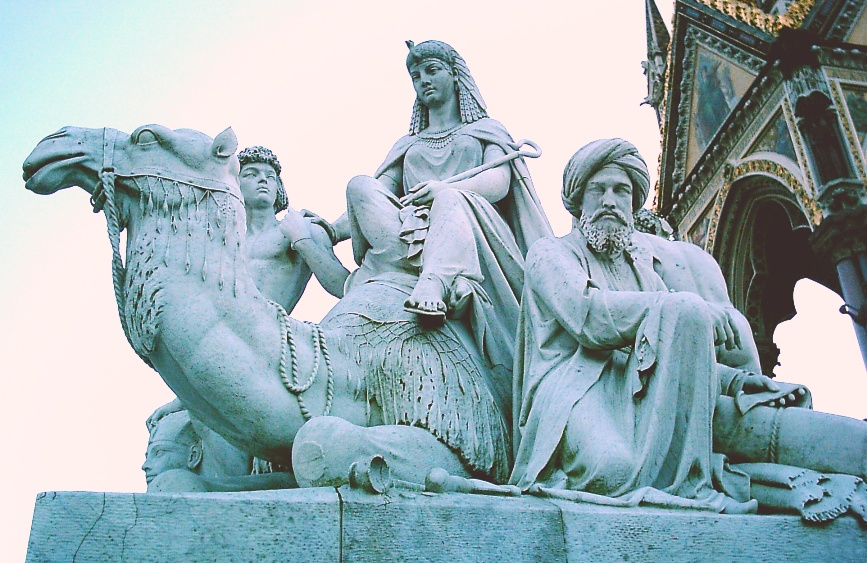
"Africa" group
by William Theed

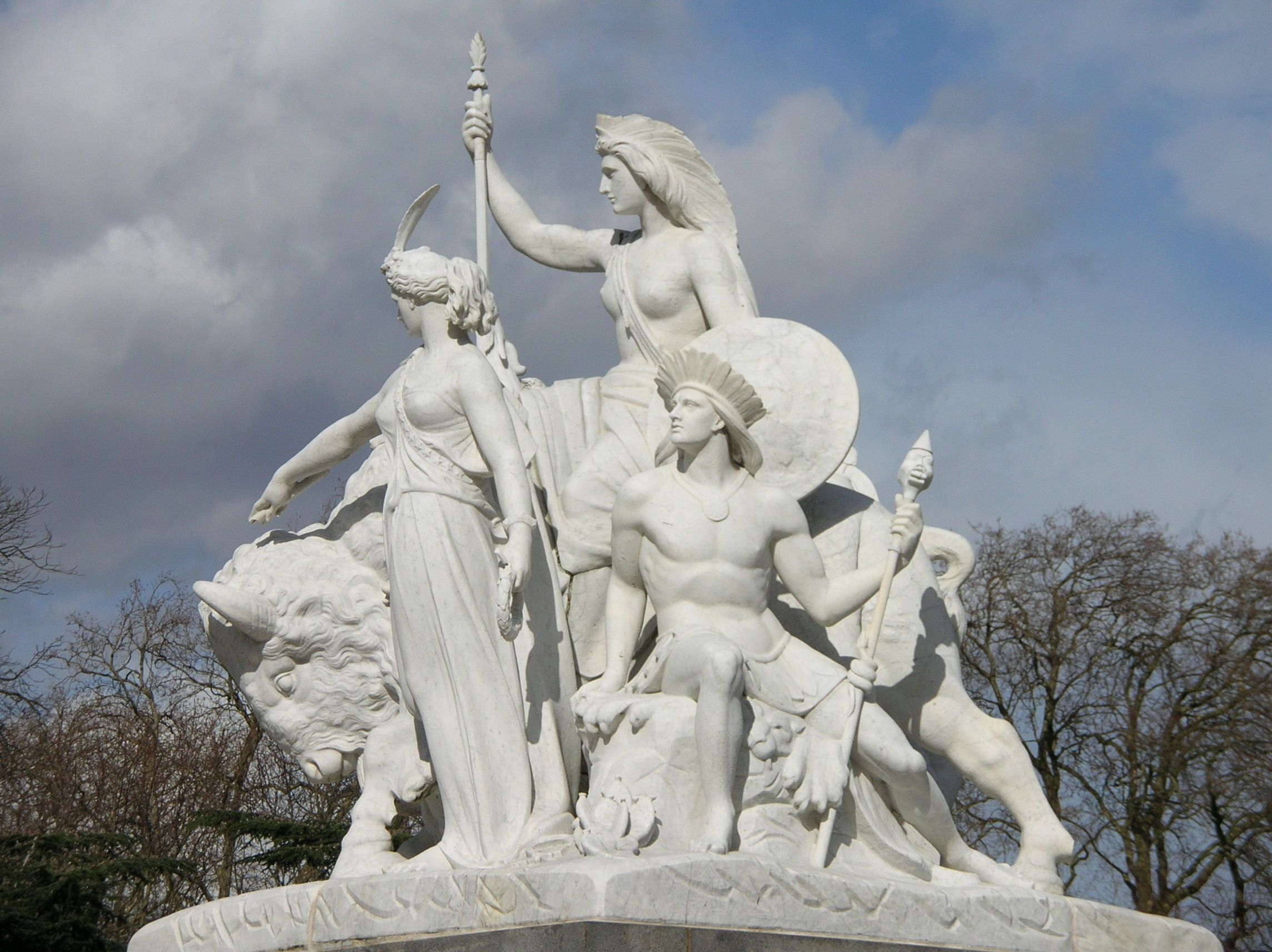
"America" group
by John Bell

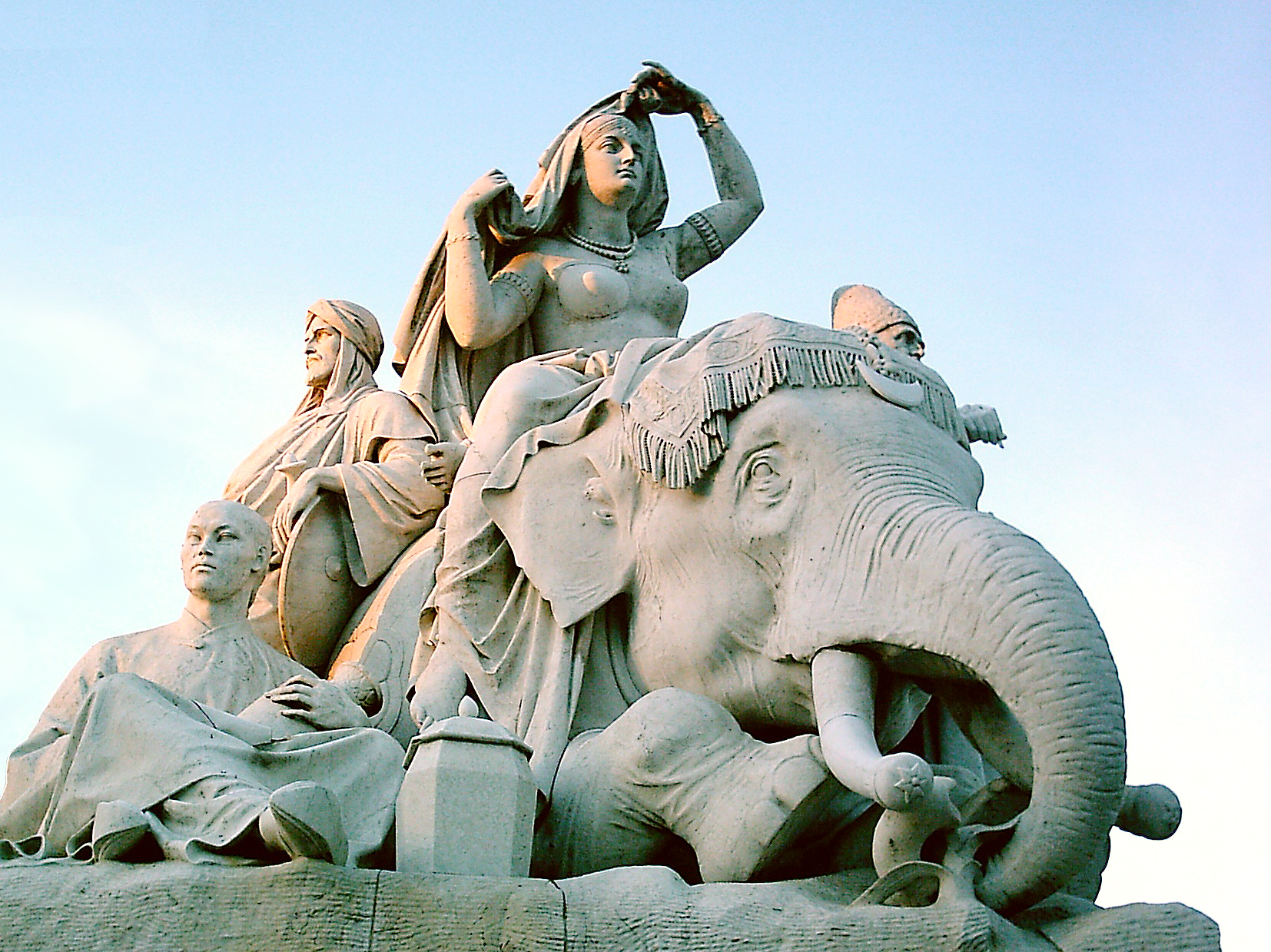
"Asia" group
by John Henry Foley featuring Set Khan Astvatsatourian

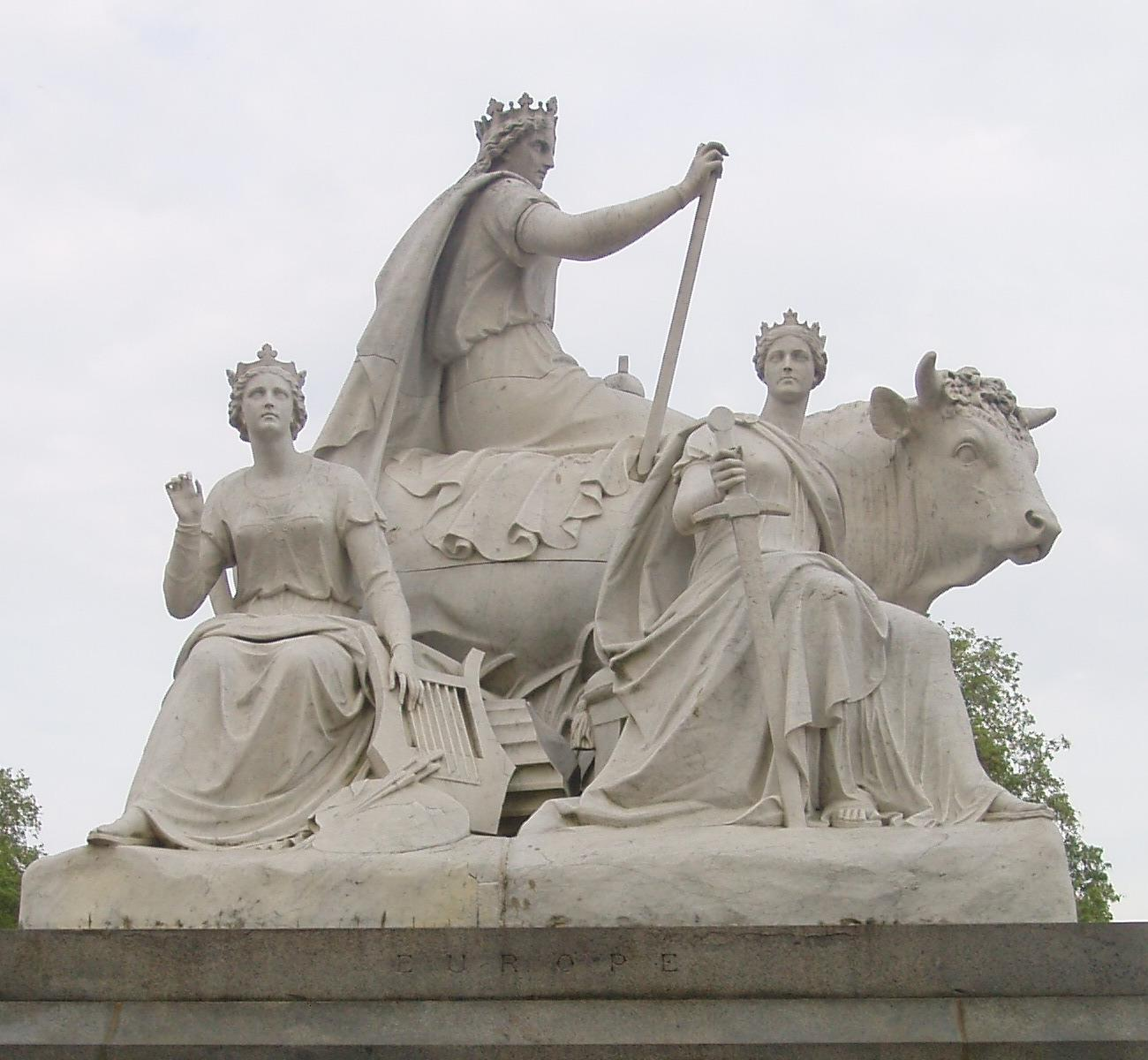
"Europe" group
by Patrick MacDowell

== Canopy ==
The form of the monument is derived from the Gothic Scaliger Tombs outside a church in Verona. The mosaics for each side and beneath the canopy of the Memorial were designed by Clayton and Bell and manufactured by the firm of Salviati of Murano, Venice.

The memorial's canopy features several mosaics as external and internal decorative artworks. Each of the four external mosaics shows a central allegorical figure of the four arts (poetry, painting, architecture and sculpture), supported by two historical figures either side. The historical figures are: King David and Homer (POESIS – poetry), Apelles and Raphael (painting), Solomon and Ictinus (architecture), and Phidias and Michelangelo (sculpture). Materials used in the mosaics include enamel, polished stone, agate, onyx, jasper, cornelian, crystal, marble, and granite.

Around the canopy, below its cornice, is a dedicatory legend split into four parts, one for each side. The legend reads: Queen Victoria And Her People • To The Memory Of Albert Prince Consort • As A Tribute Of Their Gratitude • For A Life Devoted to the Public Good.

The pillars and niches of the canopy feature eight statues representing the practical arts and sciences: Astronomy, Geology, Chemistry, Geometry (on the four pillars) and Rhetoric, Medicine, Philosophy and Physiology (in the four niches).

Near the top of the canopy's tower are eight statues of the moral and Christian virtues, including the four cardinal virtues and the three theological virtues. The virtues are: Faith, Hope, Charity and Humility, and Fortitude, Prudence, Justice and Temperance. Humility is considered to be annexed to the virtue of temperance. Above these, towards the top of the tower, are gilded angels raising their arms heavenwards. At the very top of the tower is a gold cross.

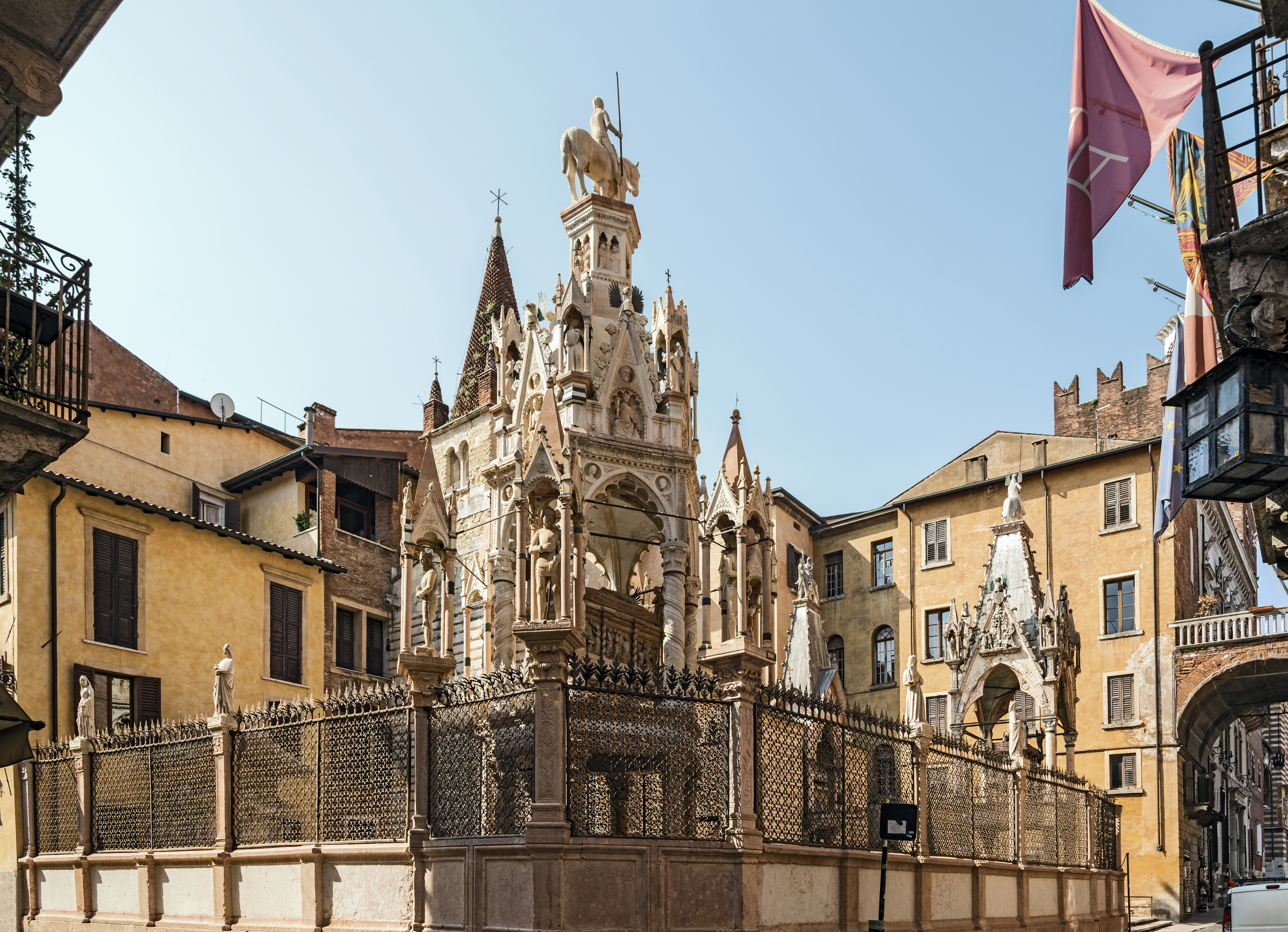
The Scaliger Tombs in Verona: in the foreground the tomb of Cansignorio della Scala, behind it that of Mastino II

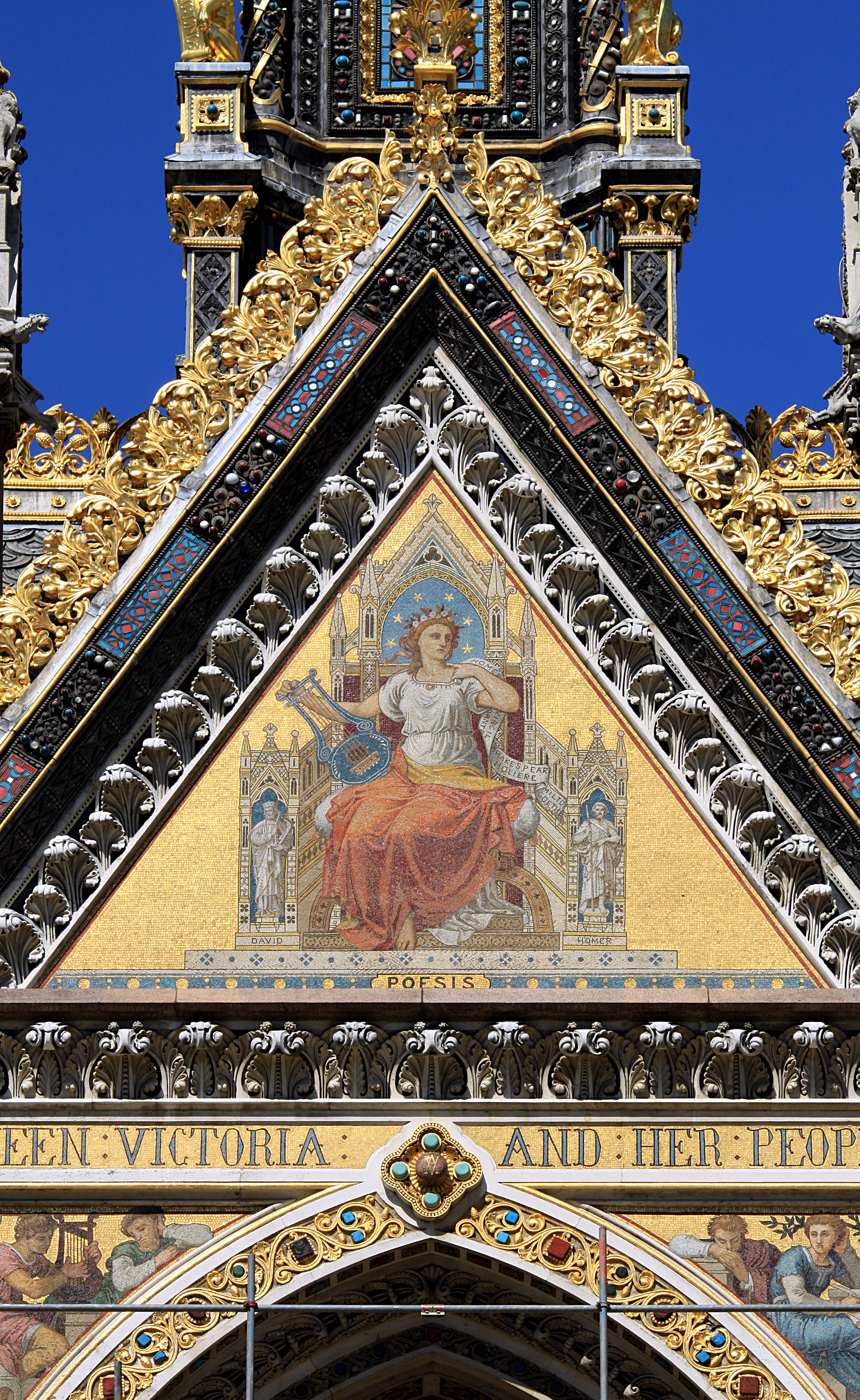
Exterior mosaic of Poesis flanked by Homer and King David

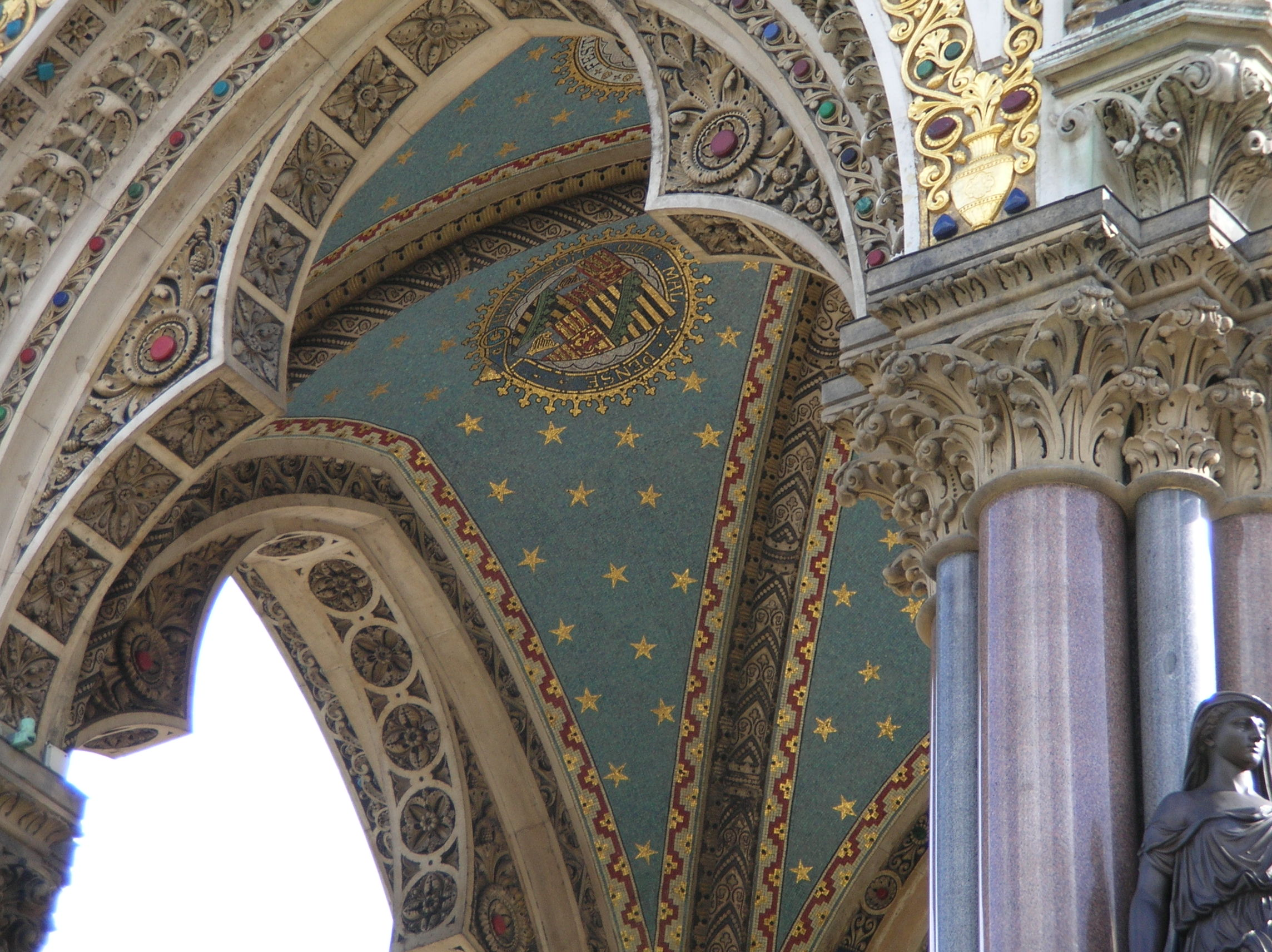
Internal mosaics and cornicing

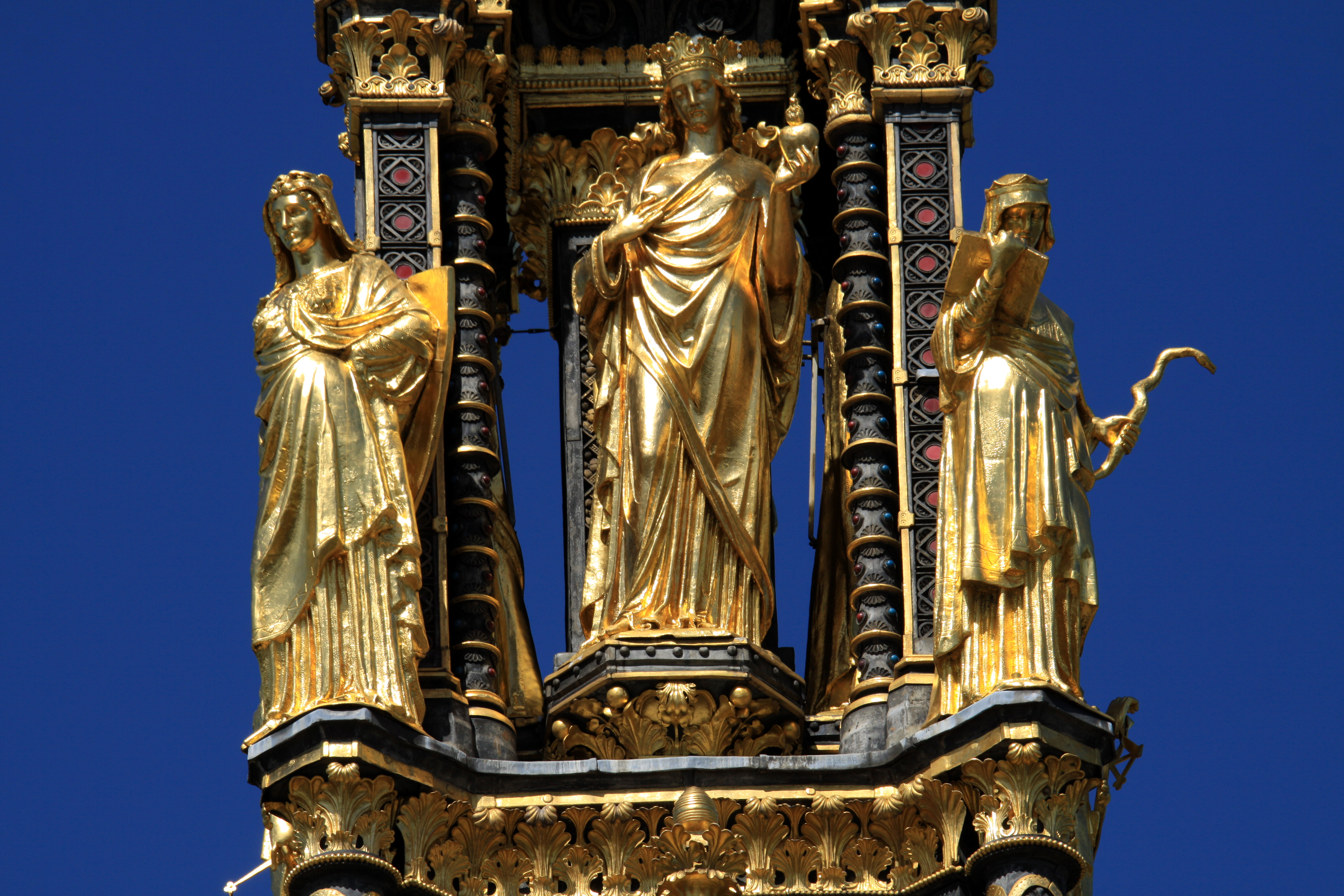
Statues of the Virtues on the canopy tower

== Foundation ==
Below the Memorial is a large undercroft, consisting of numerous brick arches, which serves as the foundation that supports the large weight of the stone and metal used to build the monument.

== Architects ==
The memorial was planned by a committee of architects led by Sir George Gilbert Scott. The other architects, some of whom died during the course of the project, or were replaced, included Carlo Marochetti, Thomas Leverton Donaldson, William Tite, Sydney Smirke, James Pennethorne, Matthew Digby Wyatt, Philip C. Hardwick, William Burn and Edward Middleton Barry.

== Sculptors ==
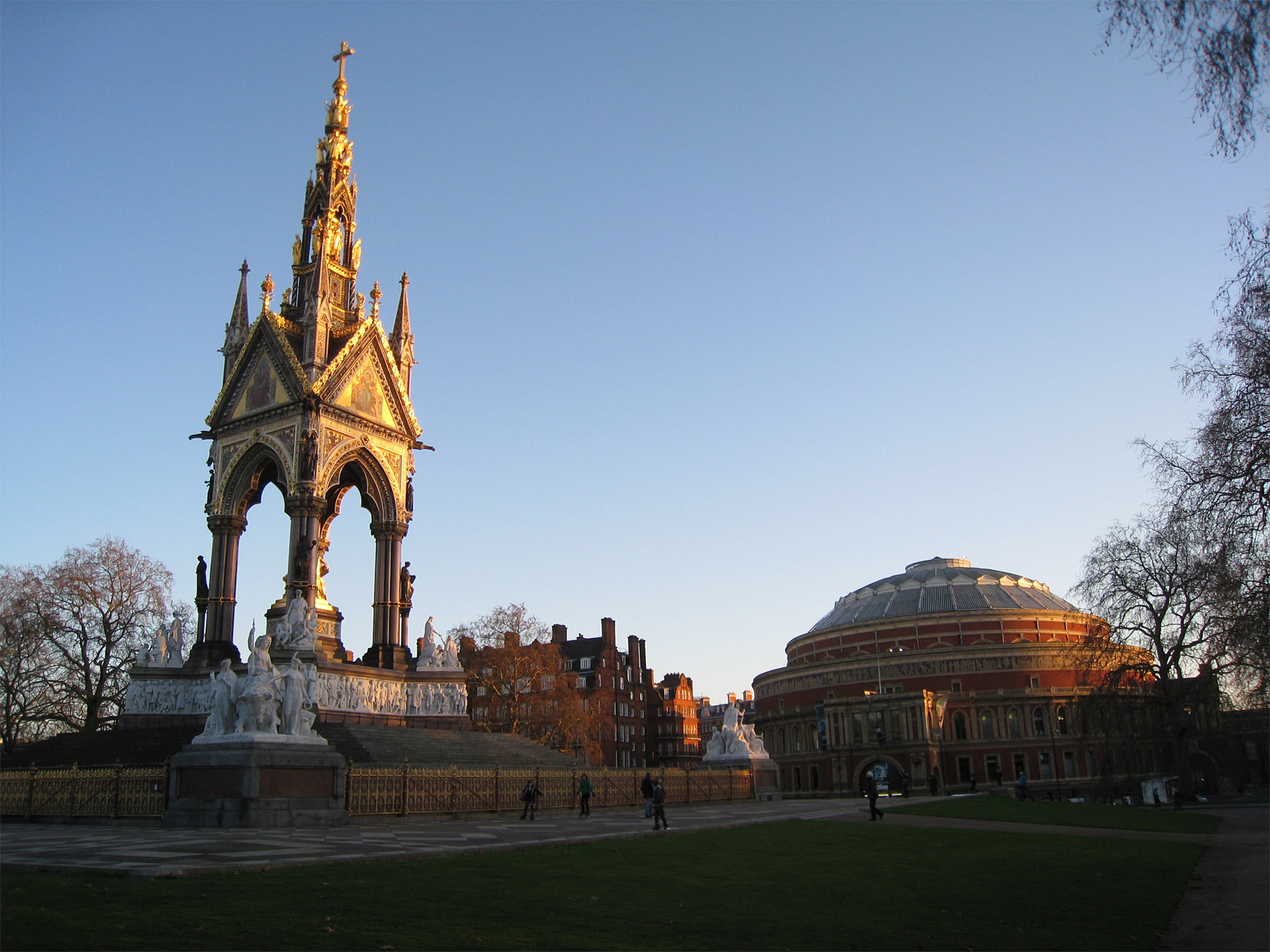
The Albert Memorial faces the Royal Albert Hall, built several years after construction began on the Memorial.

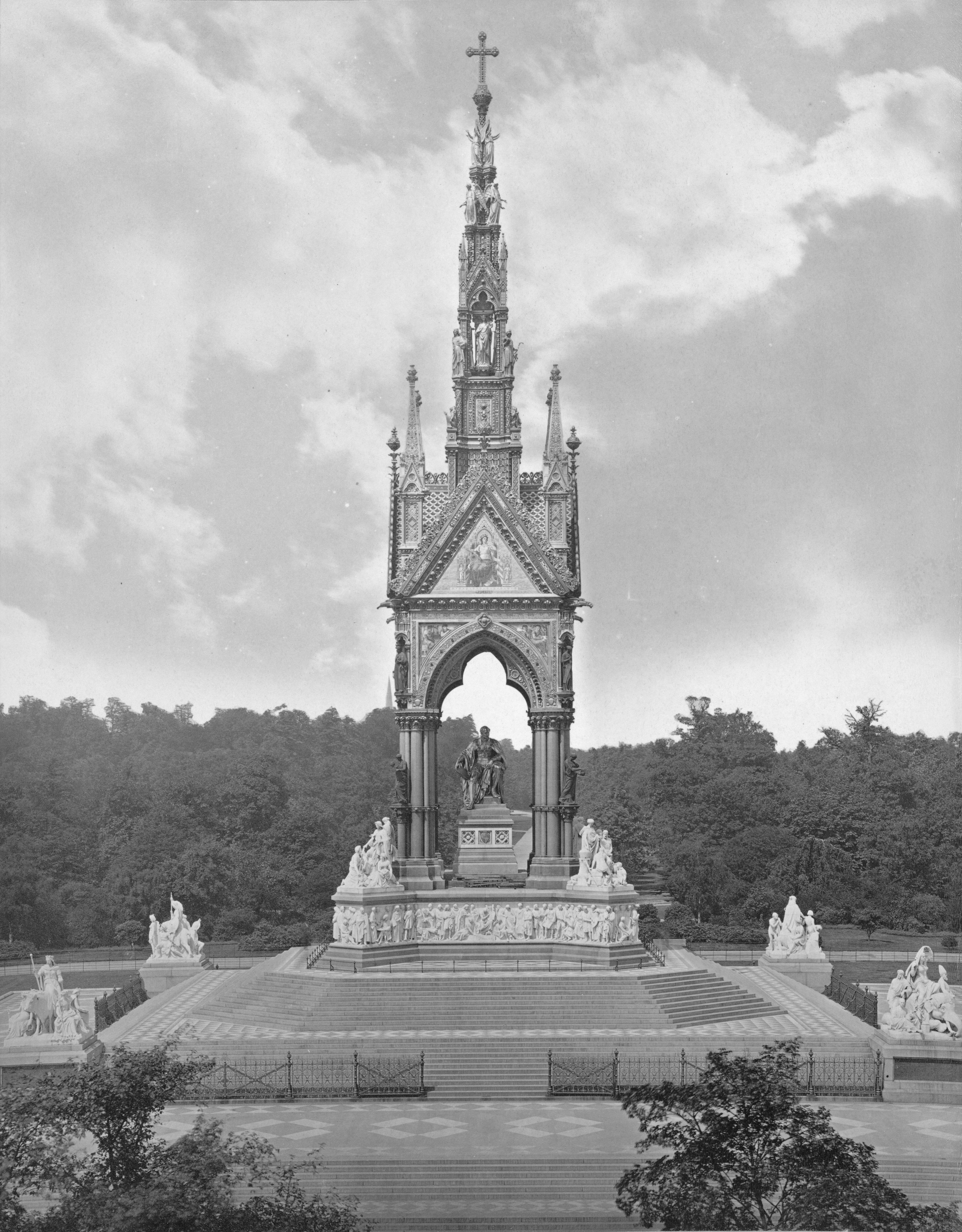
Albert Memorial shortly after its construction, albumen print, c. 1876

The sculptor Henry Hugh Armstead coordinated this massive effort among many artists of the Royal Academy, including Thomas Thornycroft (carved the "Commerce" group), Patrick MacDowell (carved the "Europe" group, his last major work), John Bell (carved the "America" group), John Henry Foley (carved the "Asia" group and started the statue of Albert), William Theed (carved the "Africa" group), William Calder Marshall, James Redfern (carved the four Christian and four moral virtues including Fortitude), John Lawlor (carved the "Engineering" group) and Henry Weekes (carved the "Manufactures" group). The Scottish sculptor William Calder Marshall carved the "Agriculture" group. The figure of Albert himself, although begun by Foley, was completed by Thomas Brock, in what was Brock's first major work.

Armstead created some 80 of the figure sculptures on the southern and eastern sides of the memorial's podium. The north and west sides were carved by the sculptor John Birnie Philip. Armstead also sculpted the bronze statues representing Astronomy, Chemistry, Rhetoric, and Medicine.

Henry Weekes carved the allegorical work Manufactures (1864–70). Although Weekes was not on Queen Victoria's original list of sculptors, being selected to work on the project only after John Gibson declined to participate, his group occupies the preferable south side of the finished monument. A central female figure holds an hourglass, symbolising the critical nature of time to industry, while an ironworker stands at his anvil and a potter and weaver offer their wares.

== Later history ==
By the late 1990s the Memorial had fallen into a state of some decay. A thorough restoration was led by Peter Inskip + Peter Jenkins Architects and the works were carried were out by Mowlem. These included cleaning, repainting, re-gilding the monument and structural repairs. In the process the cross on top of the monument, which had been put on sideways during an earlier restoration attempt, was returned to its correct position. Some of the restoration, including repairs to damaged friezes, were of limited success.

The centrepiece of the Memorial is a seated figure of Prince Albert, which is now covered in gold leaf. For eighty years the statue had been covered in black paint. Various theories had existed that it was deliberately blackened during World War I to prevent it becoming a target for Zeppelin bombing raids or domestic anti-German sentiment. English Heritage's research prior to the restoration suggests that the black coating pre-dates 1914 and may have been a response to atmospheric pollution that had destroyed the original gold leaf surface. Further restoration work, including re-pointing the steps surrounding the memorial, commenced in the summer of 2006.

Public afternoon tours are held on the first Sunday each month allowing visitors a closer look at the Frieze of Parnassus.

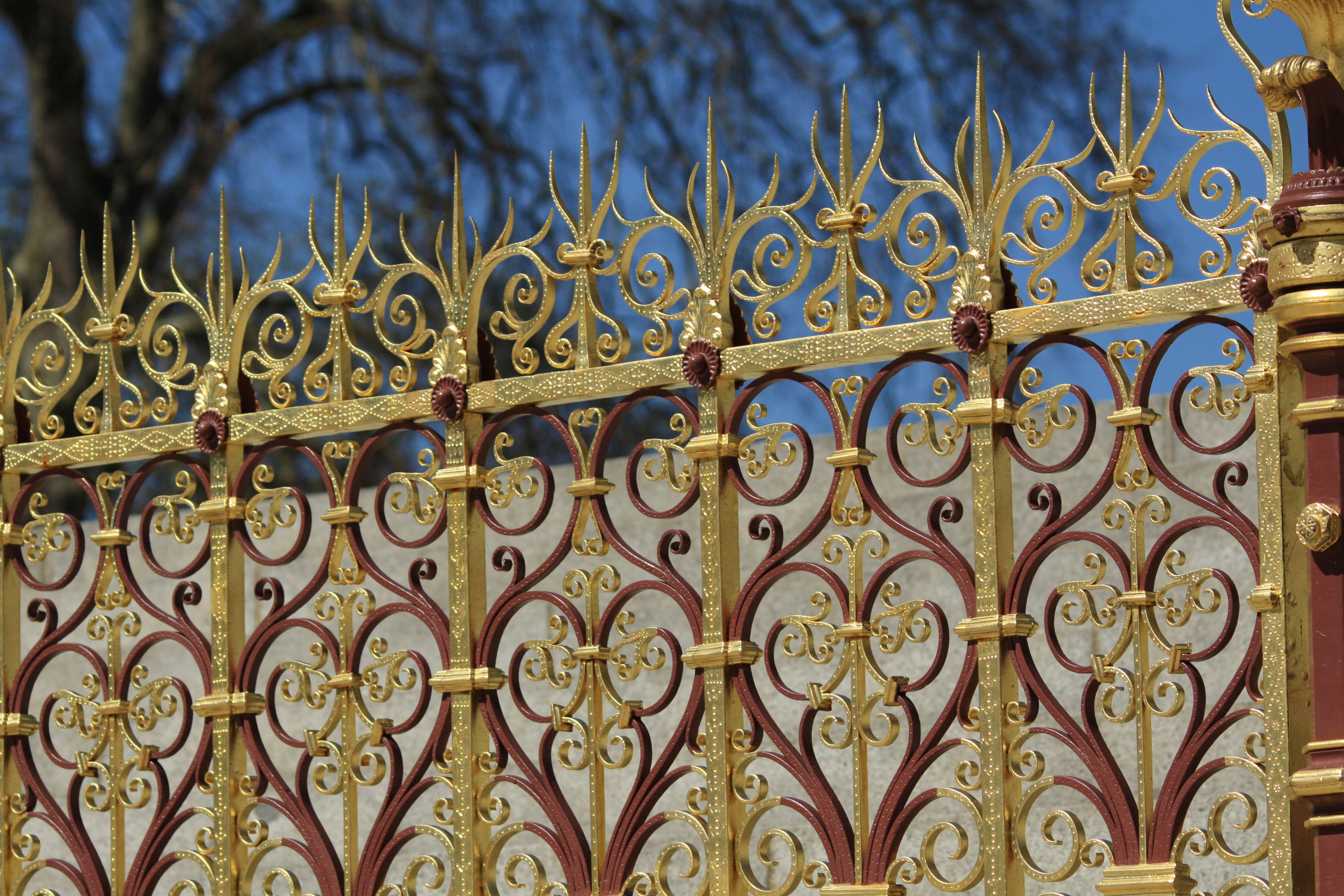
The railings after the restoration

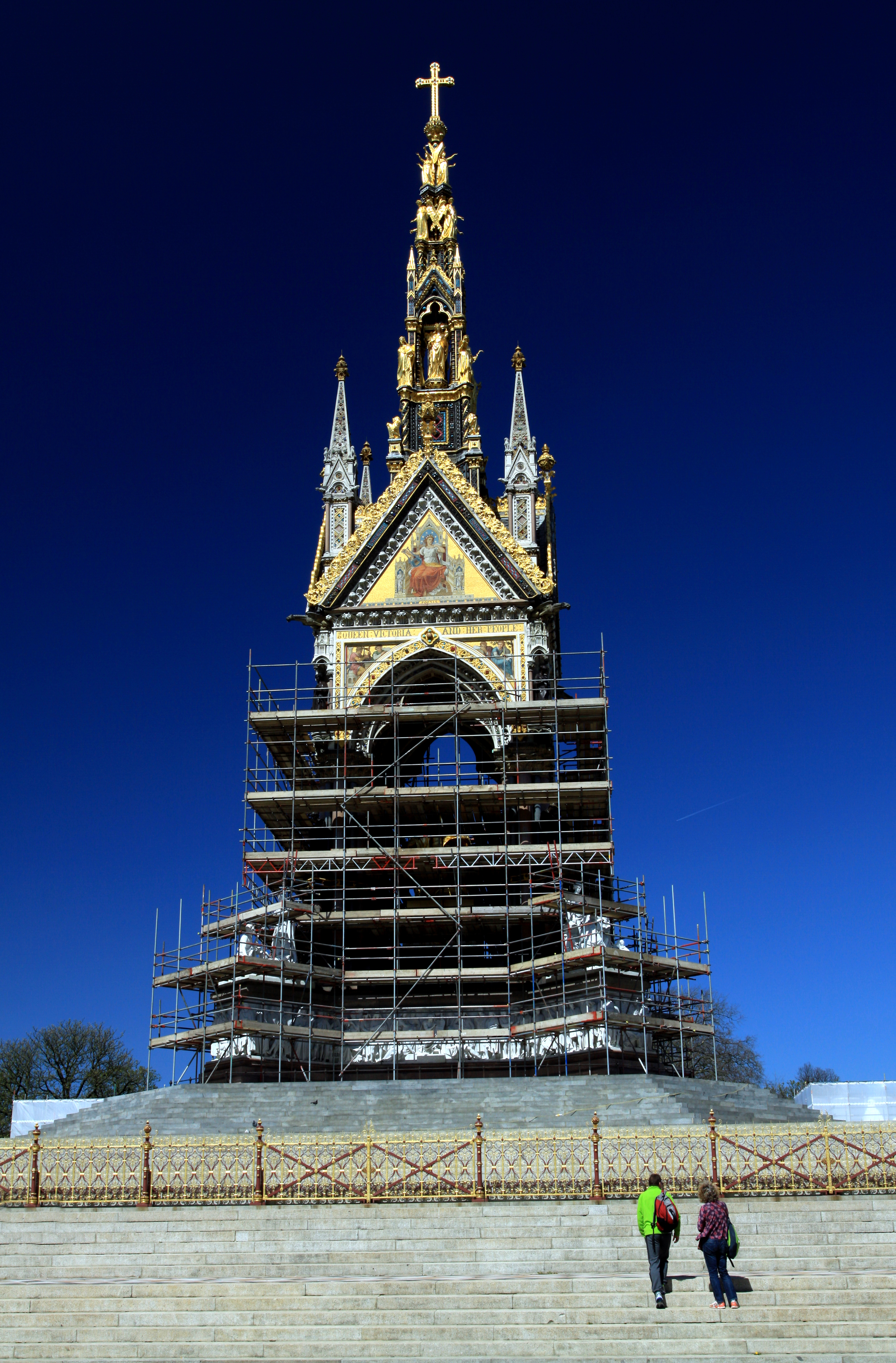
Reconstruction of the memorial in 2013

== See also ==
- List of public art in Kensington Gardens
- Statue of Albert, Prince Consort, North Inch
- Albert Memorial Clock, Belfast
