= William Calder Marshall =

Scottish sculptor (1813–1894)

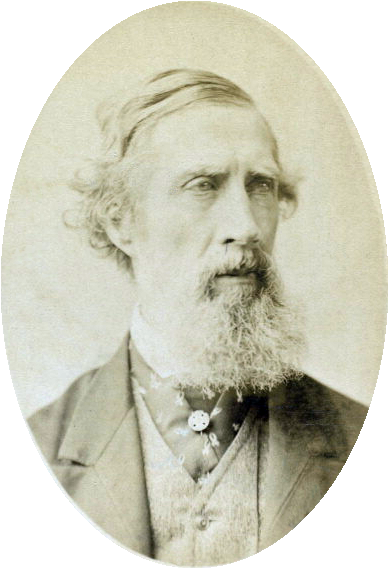
- Born: 13 March 1813; Edinburgh
- Died: 16 June 1894 (aged 81); London
- Education: Royal Academy school; Francis Chantrey; Edward Hodges Baily,
- Known for: Sculpture

William Calder Marshall RA ARSA (18 March 1813 – 16 June 1894) was a Scottish sculptor.

== Life ==
He was born at Gilmour Place in Edinburgh, the eldest son of William Marshall, a goldsmith with a shop at 1 South Bridge, and his wife Annie Calder.

William was the eldest of six younger brothers and sisters: Agnes (b. c. 1815), John (b. c. 1817), Thomas (c. 1819–1901), William (b. c. 1821), Marion (b. c. 1822) and David (1830–1897).

He attended the Edinburgh Royal High School and Edinburgh University before enrolling at the Edinburgh Trustees Academy in 1830. In 1834 he enrolled at the Royal Academy school in London, where he won the silver medal. He studied under Francis Chantrey and Edward Hodges Baily, and in 1836 he went to Rome to pursue his study of classical sculpture, staying for two years.

In 1844, he participated in an exhibition held at Westminster Hall to select artists to decorate the rebuilt Palace of Westminster. It proved to be the turning point of his career, leading to many commissions for public monuments not only for the new Houses of Parliament – for which he made statues of the Lord Chancellors Clarendon and Somers, and of Chaucer but also for Westminster Abbey and St. Paul's Cathedral. He made the colossal bronze of Robert Peel for Manchester, with figures representing the city, illustrative of manufactures and commerce, and another, symbolising the arts and sciences, at the base of the pedestal.

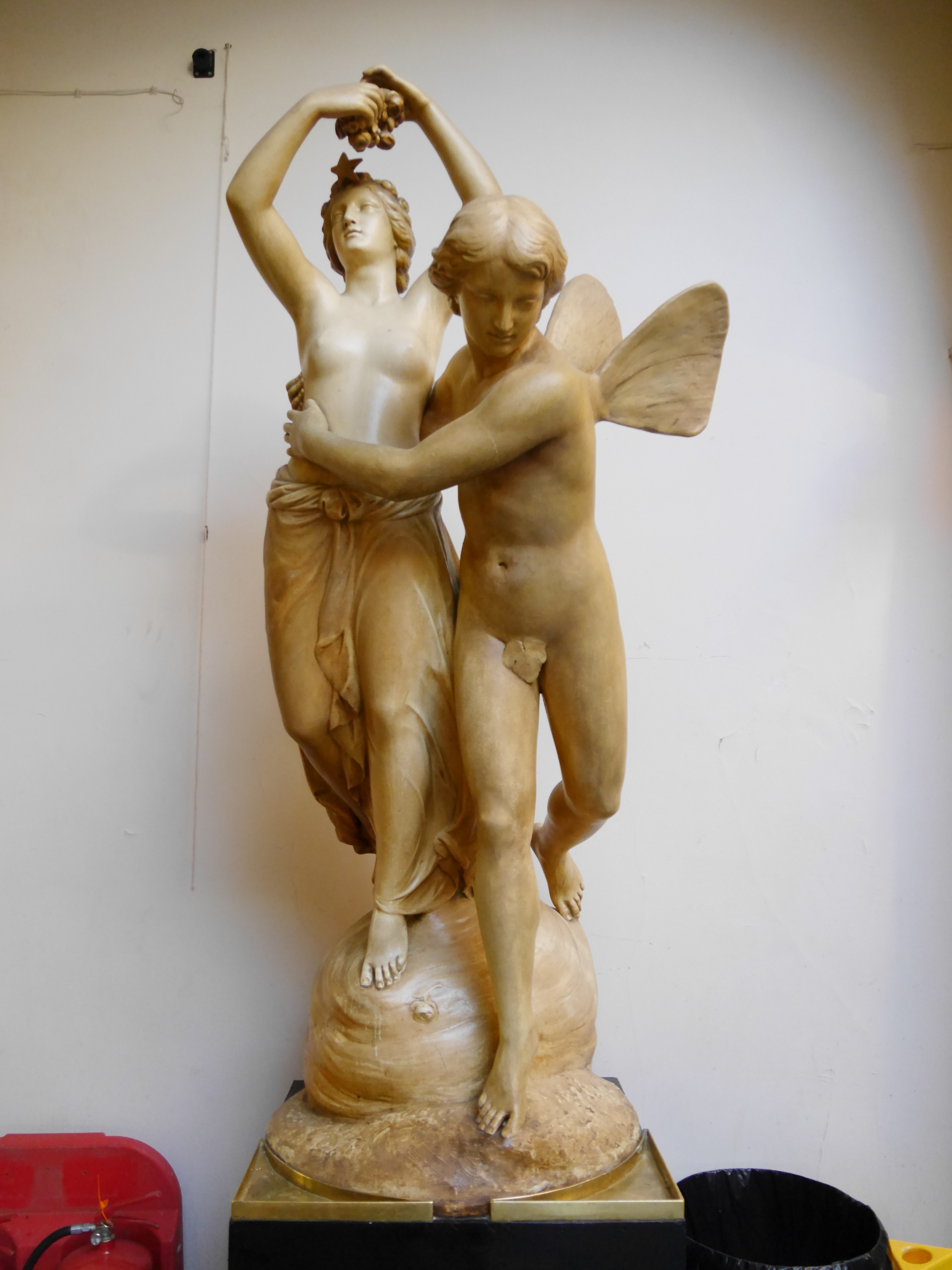
Zephyr and Aurora, Battersea Arts Centre

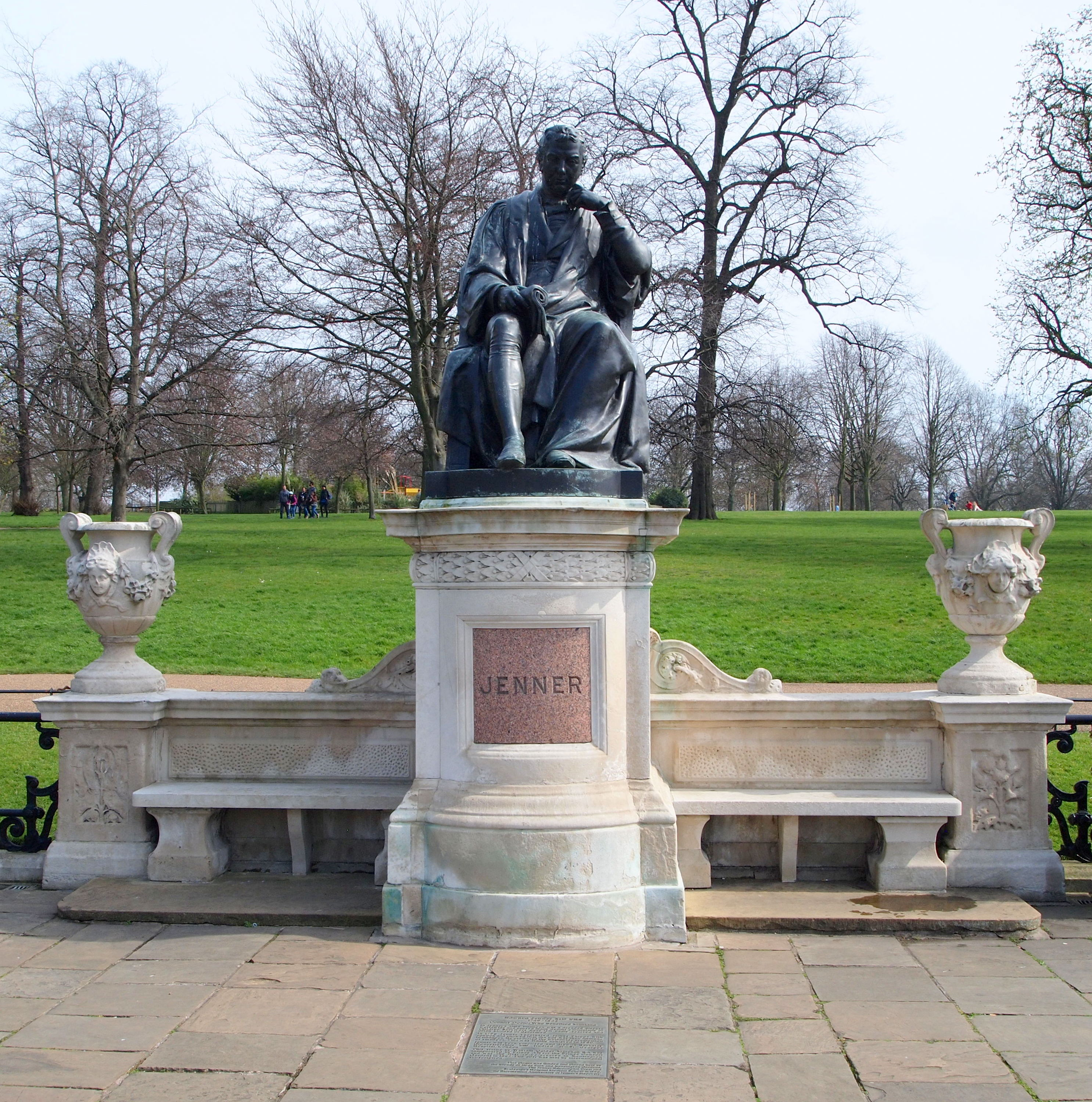
Calder Marshall's statue of Edward Jenner in Kensington Gardens, London

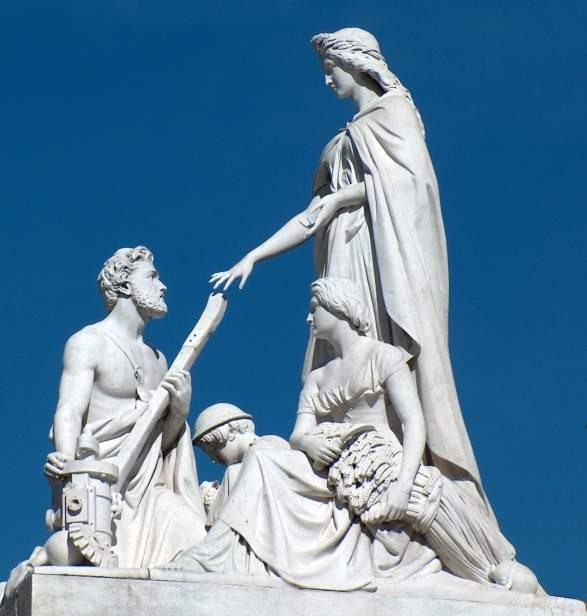
Agriculture on the Albert Memorial

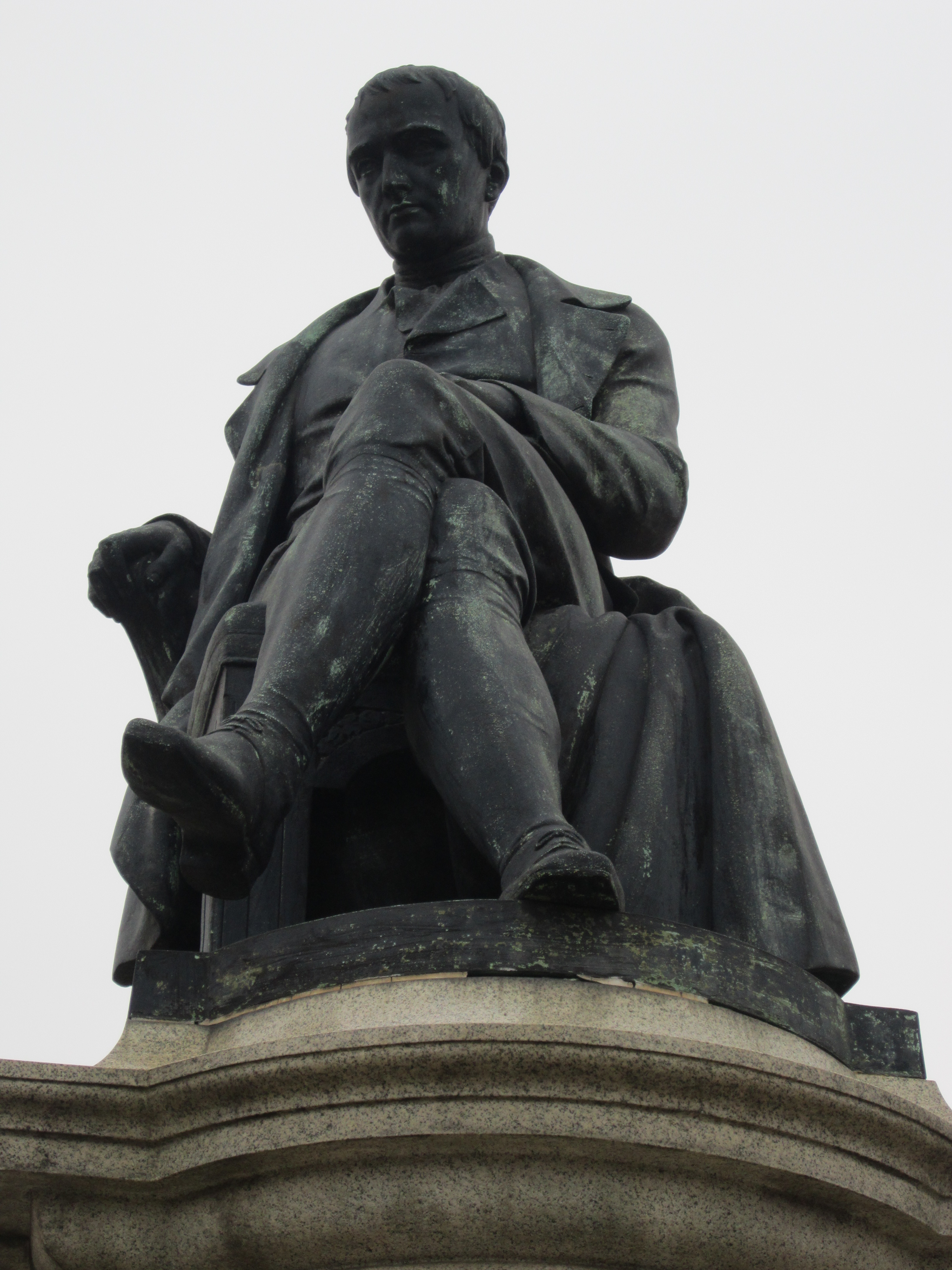
Samuel Crompton statue in Nelson Square, Bolton

His monument to Edward Jenner, the discoverer of vaccination, was set up in the south-west corner of Trafalgar Square in 1858 and inaugurated at a ceremony presided over by Prince Albert. The statue, which showed Jenner sitting in a chair in a relaxed pose, was moved to Kensington Gardens in 1862.

In June 1864, Calder Marshall was commissioned to make an allegorical group representing Agriculture, one of the four representing various "skills" to be installed on the Albert Memorial. A model was completed within two months. His ideas – unlike those of the other sculptors working on the groups – received a generally positive reception from the Executive Committee overseeing the monument, and the sculpture was completed by April 1868. It shows a female personification of Agriculture, directing the attention of farmers to the benefits of modern technology, symbolised by a steam cylinder and cog, and a retort.

Calder Marshall was the most prolific exhibitor of statuary at the Royal Academy in the Victorian age.

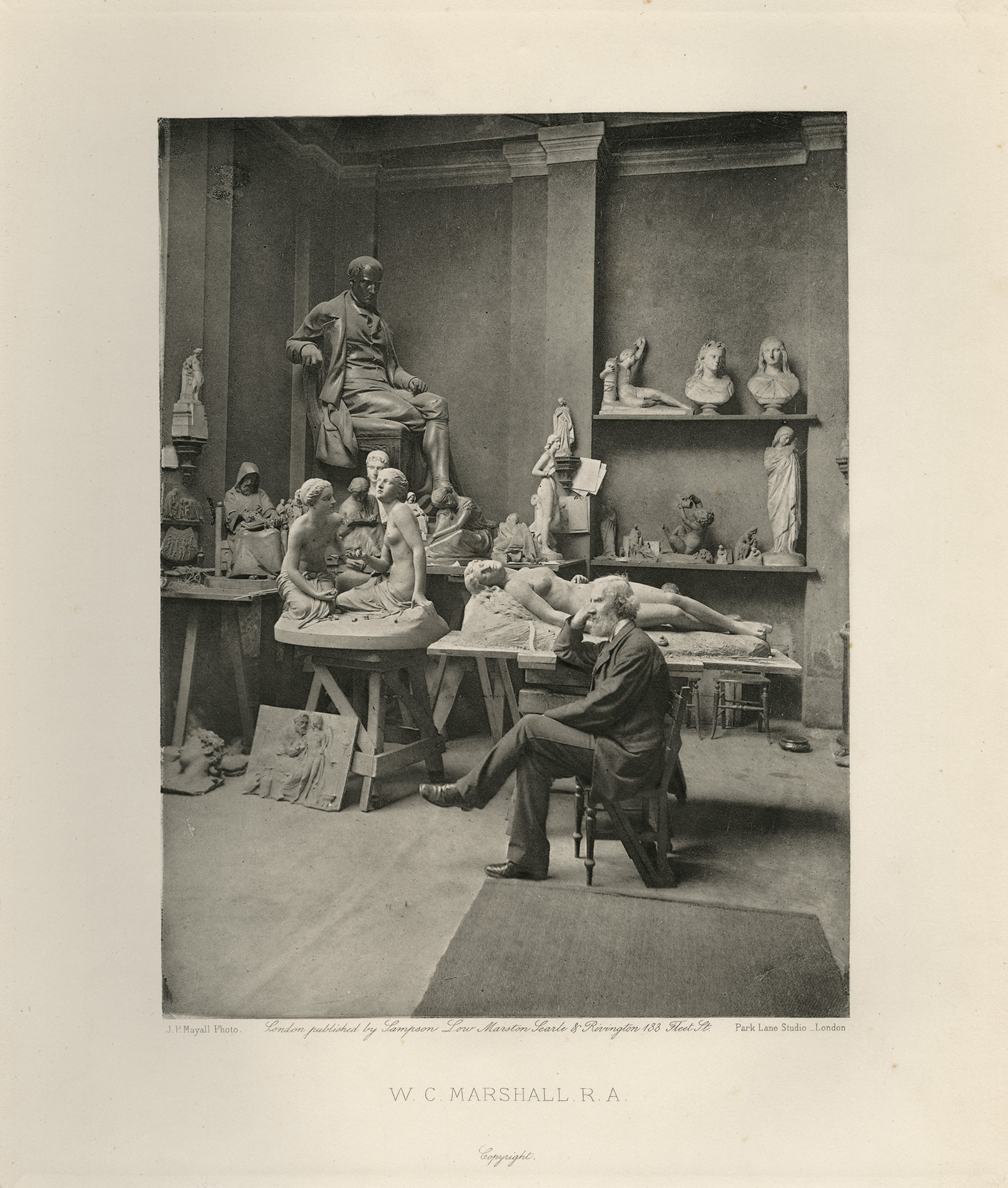
William Calder Marshall by J. P. Mayall from Artists at Home, photogravure, published 1884, Department of Image Collections, National Gallery of Art Library, Washington, DC

He died in London and was buried with his wife Margaret Calder Marshall in Kensal Green Cemetery. Two sons and a daughter lie with them.

== Works ==
- Statue of Hebe in the National Gallery of Scotland (1837)
- Statue of Lord Clarendon in the Palace of Westminster (1847)
- Statue of Lord Somers in the Palace of Westminster (1849)
- Statue of Captain Thomas Coram at the Foundling Hospital in Berkhampstead (1852)
- Memorial to Mary Blacklock exported to St Michael's Church in Charleston USA (1852)
- Statue of Sir Robert Peel at Picadilly Gardens in Manchester (1853) unveiled by William Gladstone
- Statue of Thomas Campbell in Westminster Abbey (1855)
- Statue of Sabrina at Amherst College (1857)
- Monument to Mrs Adams at Newport, Shropshire (1857)
- Statue of Edward Jenner in Kensington Gardens (1858)
- Bust of Admiral Sir Hugh Pigot (1858)
- Statue of David Hume in Montrose (1859)
- Monument to Lady Manners at Tickhill (1861)
- Statue of Samuel Crompton in Bolton (1862)
- Statue of Sir George Grey in Cape Town, South Africa (1863)
- Bust of Dr Thomas Alexander at Netley Hospital (1863)
- Statue of 7th Earl of Derby in Bolton (1865)
- Statue of Lady Godiva in Coventry (1868)
- Monument to Louisa Foljambe at Tickhill (1871)
- Bust of James Hopgood (1872)
- Bust of Sir Isaac Newton in Leicester Square (1874)

== Legacy ==
A number of his works were reproduced – often in reduced sizes – in Parian Ware porcelain by William Taylor Copeland, one representing Sabrina proving especially popular.

== Sources ==
- Caw, James Lewis (1901). "Marshall, William Calder" . In Lee, Sidney (ed.). Dictionary of National Biography (1st supplement). London: Smith, Elder & Co.
- Martin Greenwood, 'Marshall, William Calder (1813–1894)', Oxford Dictionary of National Biography. Oxford, Oxford University Press, 2004. Retrieved 6 September 2007.
