= John Lawlor (sculptor) =

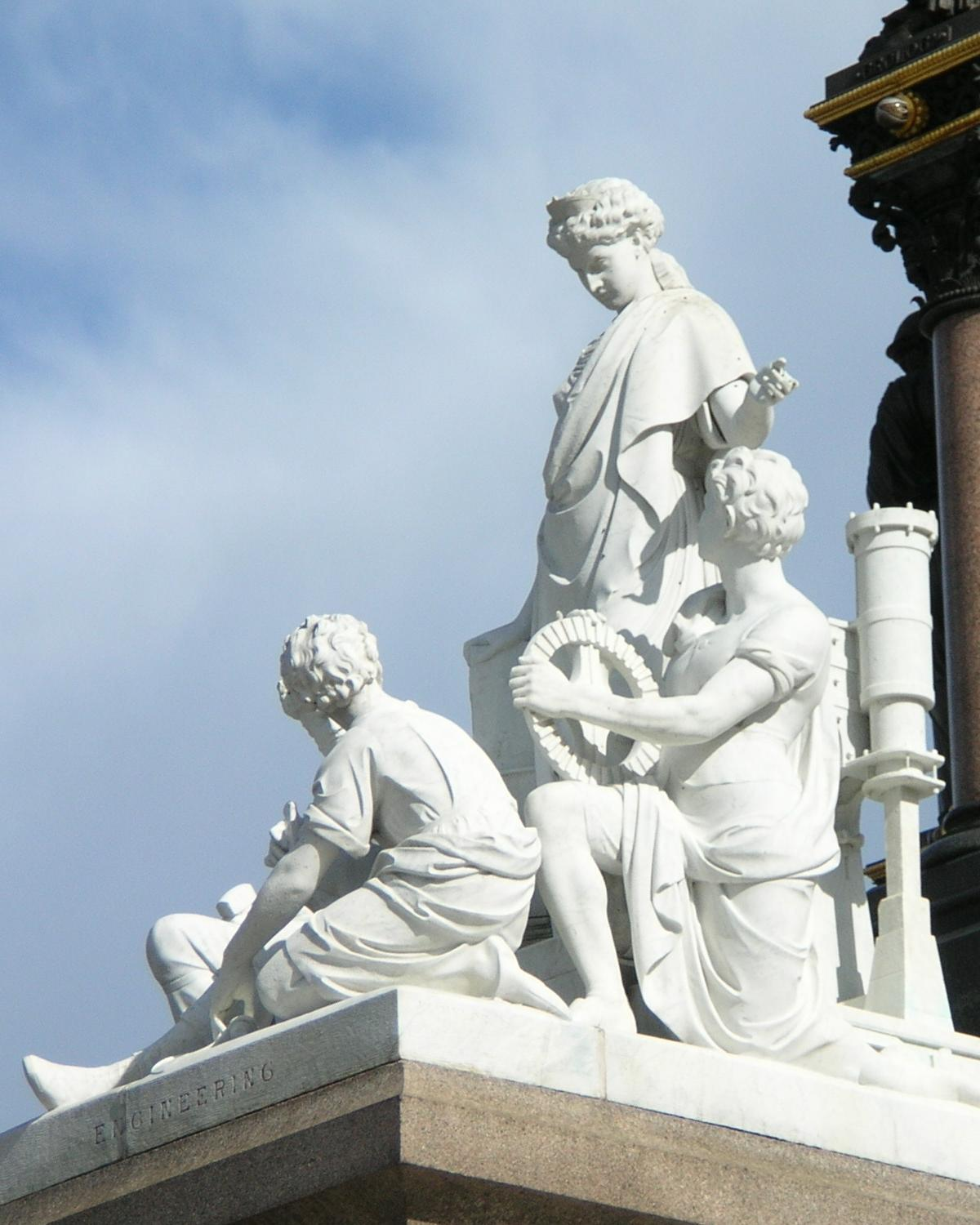
Engineering group, Albert Memorial (completed 1876, restored 2000)

John Lawlor (c. 1820 Dublin – 1901 London) was an Irish sculptor and medallist, elected to the Royal Hibernian Academy in 1861. He spent most of his career working in London, specialising in poetic subjects and portrait busts. He is noted for various statues in London, his 1881 bronze statues of Patrick Sarsfield in the grounds of St John's Cathedral in Limerick, and the 1889 statue of Bishop Delany at St Mary's Cathedral in Cork.

Lawlor received his art training at the Royal Dublin Society's Schools, studying sculpture under John Smyth (c1773-1840). In 1843 the Royal Irish Art Union purchased his "Cupid pressing Grapes into the Glass of Time," and was won as a prize by the Countess of Ranfurly. He exhibited a "Boy and Dog" at the Royal Hibernian Academy in 1844, and was one of eight artists commissioned to produce the plaques on the corners of the Albert Memorial in Kensington Gardens, also executing the large group "Engineering."

In 1845 he moved to London, soon being recognised as an accomplished sculptor, first living in Wyndham Street, then moving to Stanhope Street, Hampstead Road, where he was still staying in the 1880s. After his arrival in London he worked for a period with John Thomas, helping to create some of the figures adorning the exterior of the Houses of Parliament, though it is difficult to attribute individual figures to one or the other. In 1847 he joined the Royal Academy schools on Thomas’s recommendation. His first exhibition at the Royal Academy was in 1848.

From his first contribution in 1844 he continued to exhibit at intervals with the Royal Hibernian Academy. His "Bather" was exhibited there in 1851, and at the Dublin International Exhibition in 1853, and was later rendered in marble for the Prince Consort and placed at Osborne in 1856. His statuette, "Solitude," and the group "Suffer little Children to come unto Me", were purchased by the Art Union, and appeared in the London Exhibition of 1851.

Other works by Lawlor which received acclaim were "Titania," a marble statue in the Royal Academy in 1868, the "Emigrant" of 1853 and "Clio". He visited America in 1886, and received a number of commissions, remaining there until the autumn of 1888. On his return he stayed in Cork for some time, finishing the statue of Bishop Delany which was placed outside the Cathedral, and some statues for the Queenstown church in Cork. He did quite a number of busts including that of "Daniel O'Connell," "Smith O'Brien," John O'Connor Power and "James O'Kelly, M.P." He was a popular figure in London's artistic and literary circles, his tall, striking appearance, ready wit, genial manner and fine baritone making him a sought-after guest. He did not produce a steady output, but rather worked only when the inclination took him or when obliged by financial necessity, and thus did not provide for his old age. He remained a bachelor his entire life.

His sister Bridget had married John Kelly, a blacksmith and draymaker, and remained in Dublin. When her husband died in 1861, she herself in poor health, moved to London with her five children. Aloysius, the youngest boy, became an accomplished painter under the name Aloysius O'Kelly. In London, John Lawlor had become a loyal supporter of the secret Irish Republican Brotherhood or Fenians, and was careful to keep his political affiliations out of his public life as an artist. His home was regarded as a safe house by the movement.

== See also ==
- John Cassidy (1860–1939), fellow Irish sculptor in England, who worked primarily in Manchester
