= Charles James Richardson =

English architect, artist and writer

Charles James Richardson (1806–1871) was an English architect, artist and writer.

== Life ==
Richardson was a pupil of Sir John Soane, from 1824 to 1830; he then became Soane's assistant, holding the position until 1837 and Soane's death. Soane's will envisaged that Richardson would be the assistant curator and librarian of the Soane Museum. In the event, for financial reasons, he was not offered a post. For a period Richardson tried, without success, to set up an architectural academy. He became a Fellow of the Royal Institute of British Architects in 1838, remaining a member to 1868.

From 1845 to 1852 Richardson was master of the architectural class in the school of design at Somerset House. In 1852 he designed Leicester Stanhope, 5th Earl of Harrington's mansion 13 Kensington Palace Gardens; in 1853 he carried out works at Belsize Park, Hampstead, and in 1856 a block of mansions in Queen's Gate, Hyde Park, for W. Jackson. He died in 1871.

== Works ==
Richardson published:

- Holbein's Ceiling of the Chapel Royal, St. James's, 1837.
- Observations on the Architecture of England during the Reigns of Queen Elizabeth and James I, 1837.

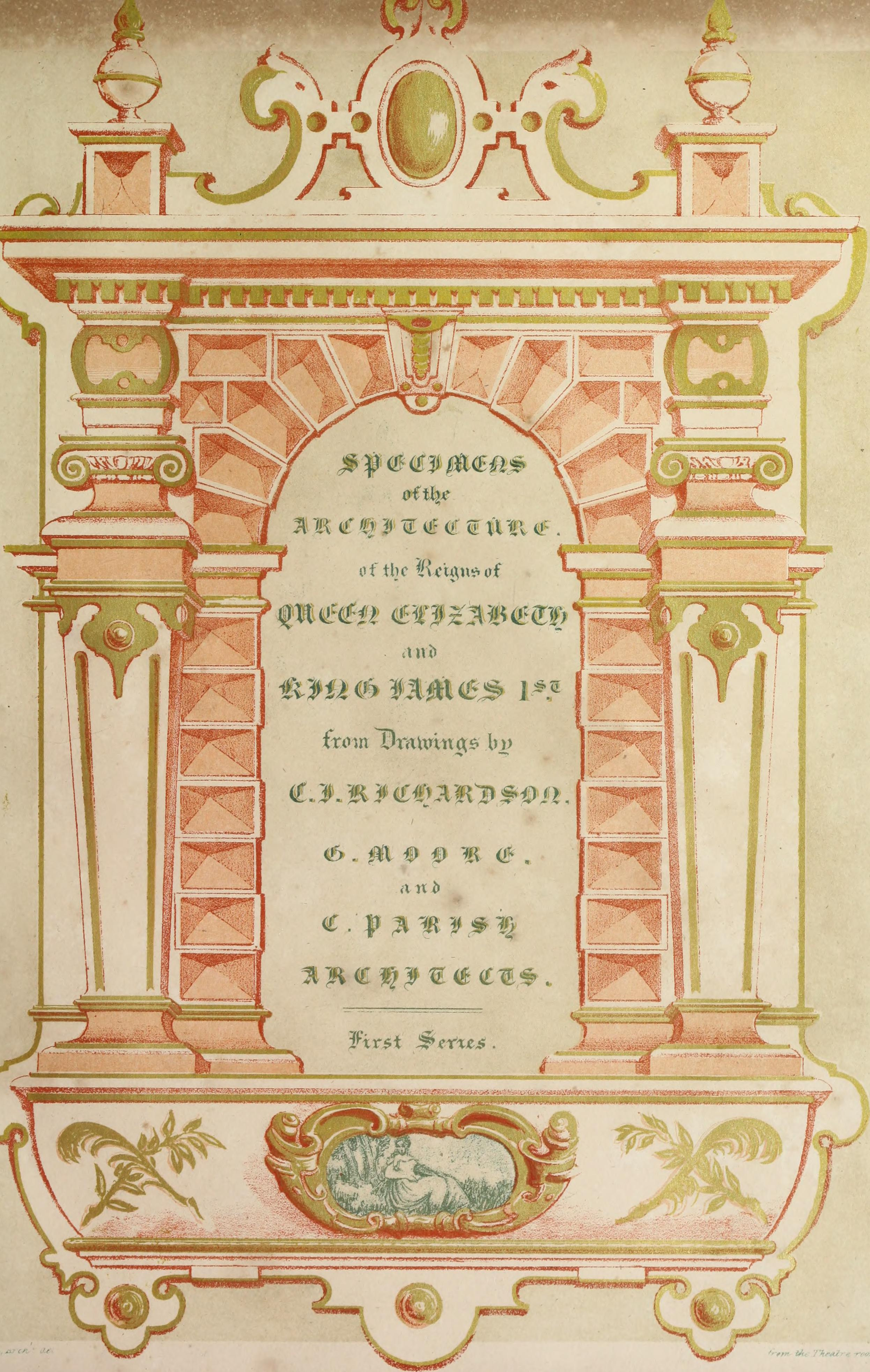
Observations on the Architecture of England during the Reigns of Queen Elizabeth and James I, title page

- A Design for raising Holborn Valley, 1837; reissued in 1863.
- A Popular Treatise on the Warming and Ventilation of Buildings, 1837.
- Description of Warming Apparatus, 1839.
- Architectural Remains of the Reigns of Elizabeth and James I, 1840.
- Studies from Old English Mansions, 4 vols. 1841–8.
- The Workman's Guide to the Study of Old English Architecture, 1845.
- A Letter to the Council of the Head Government School of Design, 1846.
- Studies of Ornamental Design, 1851.
- The Smoke Nuisance and its Remedy, 1869.
- Picturesque Designs for Mansions, Villas, Lodges, etc. 1870 was a popular and influential work favouring a Tudor style, with a second edition as The Englishman's House, from a Cottage to a Mansion, 1871, and three further editions under that name; and a New York edition in 1873 as Housebuilding, from a Cottage to a Mansion. It deprecated stoves as a substitute for open fires. A new edition with the title The Englishman's house. : A practical guide for selecting and building a house appeared in 1898.

Richardson compiled:

- A collection of 549 original drawings by English architects, with several volumes of studies, including tracings from designs by John Vanbrugh, Robert Adam, John Thorpe, and Charles Heathcote Tatham, and drawings of buildings, furniture, and ornaments, mainly of the Elizabethan period. The provenance of some of these drawings was John Soane's collection. Richardson made two sales from this collection to the South Kensington Museum library in 1863–4. He had borrowed drawings by Soane, Adam and William Chambers from Soane, saying he was intending to copy them, that he did not return. Now in the Victoria & Albert Museum, these holdings represent the only substantial collection of Soane's work, besides the Soane Museum's.
- Two volumes of proofs of his own designs, from The Builder. It went to the British Museum library.
- A volume with extra-illustration of Soane material that came to light in 2003, in the British Library, accession to the British Museum library being in 1869 via the bookseller James Rimell.

A sketchbook of views and details of Richardson's house at Ealing, and a collection of the drawings which he used at his architectural lectures, were left to the Soane Museum.
