= Emmeline Halse =

British sculptor (1853–1930)

- Born: 25 May 1853; Bayswater, London
- Died: 6 February 1930 (aged 76); Chalfont St. Giles, Buckinghamshire
- Education: Royal Academy Schools; Ecole des Beaux-Arts
- Known for: Sculpture

Emmeline Halse (25 May 1853 – 6 February 1930) was a British sculptor known for her depiction of mythological subjects. She was a frequent exhibitor of such works at both the Royal Academy and in Paris during the late nineteenth century.

== Biography ==
Halse was born in London into an artistic family, one of the four children of George Halse, a bank manager, author and sculptor, and Mitilda Lydia Davis, whose own father was a member of the royal bodyguard. After some training from her father, Emmeline Halse attended the Royal Academy Schools from 1877 to 1883. At the Academy she was taught by Lord Leighton and won three medals. Halse continued her education in Paris at the École des Beaux-Arts and was taught by Frédéric-Louis-Désiré Bogino.

During her career Halse created portrait busts, reliefs and life-size marble statues as well as smaller pieces such as wax figures, medallions and terracotta tiles. She regularly showed works in Paris, at the Walker Art Gallery in Liverpool, in Manchester, Glasgow and also in London, including at least 33 pieces at the Royal Academy between 1878 and 1920. Her 1887 relief sculpture, The Pleiades, is held by Glasgow Museums. Other institutions and several churches acquired, or commissioned, works by Halse, most notably the large reredos of the Crucifixion in the Church of St John the Evangelist in Ladbroke Grove. Both of her parents died with a few months of each other in the winter of 1895 to 1896 and Halse sculpted their headstone for a cemetery in Kensington. For most of her adult life Halse lived at Chalfont St Giles in Buckinghamshire.
