= Ranfurly Shield 1910–1919 =

New Zealand rugby union trophy

The Ranfurly Shield, colloquially known as the Log o' Wood, is perhaps the most prestigious trophy in New Zealand's domestic rugby union competition. First played for in 1904, the Ranfurly Shield is based on a challenge system, rather than a league or knockout competition as with most football trophies. The holding union must defend the Shield in challenge matches, and if a challenger defeats them, they become the new holder of the Shield.

== Holders ==
Three unions held the Ranfurly Shield between 1910 and 1919. Due to the outbreak of World War I, however, no matches were played between 1915 and 1918.

Union	Won	Successful defences
Auckland	Held at beginning of decade	11
Taranaki	16 August 1913	6
Wellington	10 September 1914	5

== Fixtures ==
=== 1910 ===
13 August 1910

Auckland	11–3	Hawke's Bay
Try: R.B. Magee, J.T. Wylie, Frank Morse; Con: William Cunningham		Try: R. McEwan

Alexandra Park, Auckland
Attendance: 5,000
Referee: J. Williams (Auckland)

20 August 1910

Auckland	3–3	Wellington
Drop: Joe O'Leary		Try: Frederick Roberts

Alexandra Park, Auckland
Attendance: 15,000
Referee: J. Williams (Auckland)

3 September 1910

Auckland	16–9	Taranaki
Try: H. Harrison, George Tyler; Con: R.B. Magee, Joe O'Leary; Pen: Joe O'Leary (2)		Try: L.J. Hill; Pen: Leonard Stohr; Drop: Leonard Stohr

Alexandra Park, Auckland
Attendance: 12,000
Referee: Edward McKenzie (Wairarapa)

10 September 1910

Auckland	6–4	Canterbury
Try: H. Harrison, J.T. Wylie		Drop: A.E. Doell

Alexandra Park, Auckland
Attendance: 10,000
Referee: Angus Campbell (Auckland)

=== 1911 ===
23 August 1911

Auckland	21–5	South Auckland
Try: Dougie McGregor (2), R.B. Magee, Harold Hayward, James Stewart, T.M. Wilkes; Pen: Joe O'Leary		Try: S.Darby; Con: A. Hyde

Alexandra Park, Auckland
Attendance: 2,000
Referee: C.W. Oram (Auckland)

16 September 1911

Auckland	29–10	Poverty Bay
Try: Victor Macky (2), A.C. Wilson (2), J.A. Bruce, Joe O'Leary, Dougie McGregor; Con: Joe O'Leary (2), R.B. Magee, Victor Macky		Try: Aorere Mahaki, Robert Douglas; Drop: Erekana Pewhairangi

Alexandra Park, Auckland
Attendance: 6,000
Referee: F. Spurdle (Taranaki)

=== 1912 ===
17 August 1912

Auckland	6–5	Taranaki
Try: Victor Macky; Pen: Karl Ifwersen		Try: Jack McLeod; Con: John Franklin

Alexandra Park, Auckland
Attendance: 12,000
Referee: Edward McKenzie (Wairarapa)

24 August 1912

Auckland	12–0	Wellington
Try: Victor Macky (4)

Alexandra Park, Auckland
Attendance: 15,000
Referee: Edward McKenzie (Wairarapa)

7 September 1912

Auckland	5–5	Otago
Try: Victor Macky; Con: T.P. Walshe		Try: W. Alexander; Con: E. Watson

Alexandra Park, Auckland
Attendance: 3,000
Referee: J. Williams (Auckland)

=== 1913 ===
19 July 1913

Auckland	6–5	Wellington
Try: C.L. Nisbet; Pen: Joe O'Leary		Try: Frank Mitchinson; Con: A.C. Evensen

Alexandra Park, Auckland
Attendance: 7,000
Referee: George Nicholson (Auckland)

9 August 1913

Auckland	27–3	Poverty Bay
Try: Dougie McGregor (2), Victor Macky, J.T. Wylie; Con: Joe O'Leary (3); Pen: Joe O'Leary (3)		Drop: William Tate

Alexandra Park, Auckland
Attendance: 5,000
Referee: R.L. Simpson (Wellington)

16 August 1913

Auckland	11–14	Taranaki
Try: W. McK. Geddes, Lyn Weston, Dougie McGregor; Con: Joe O'Leary		Try: R.W. Roberts (2), George Loveridge, Henry Dewar; Con: G.J. Hawkins

Alexandra Park, Auckland
Attendance: 10,000
Referee: Edward McKenzie (Wairarapa)

=== 1914 ===
27 June 1914

Taranaki	17–3	Wanganui
Try: Reginald Taylor, C.C. Whittington, John Colman; Con: Leonard Stohr; Pen: Leonard Stohr; Drop: Leonard Stohr		Try: S.J. Smith

Showgrounds Oval, Hāwera
Referee: W.J. Meredith (Wellington)

23 July 1914

Taranaki	11–3	Manawatu
Try: John Kissick, G.F. Bertrand, James Robertson; Con: Leonard Stohr		Try: William Carroll

Pukekura Park, New Plymouth
Attendance: 1,500
Referee: F. Spurdle (Taranaki)

5 August 1914

Taranaki	14–3	Horowhenua
Try: O.M. Young, C.R. Birchall, R. Paterson; Con: Leonard Stohr; Pen: Leonard Stohr		Drop: Nepia Winiata

Showgrounds Oval, Hāwera
Attendance: 500
Referee: W.B. Scott (Wanganui)

13 August 1914

Taranaki	22–3	Wairarapa
Try: C.F. Young (4), C.C. Whittington, R. Paterson; Con: Leonard Stohr (2)		Try: W. Redmond

Victoria Park, Stratford
Attendance: 1,000
Referee: W.J. Meredith (Wellington)

20 August 1914

Taranaki	6–5	Canterbury
Try: C.C. Whittington; Pen: Leonard Stohr		Try: Edward Hasell; Con: E.E. Crawshaw

Pukekura Park, New Plymouth
Attendance: 2,500
Referee: W.J. Meredith (Wellington)

27 August 1914

Taranaki	6–0	Southland
Try: R.W. Roberts, Donald Cameron

Pukekura Park, New Plymouth
Attendance: 1,500
Referee: George Nicholson (Auckland)

10 September 1914

Taranaki	6–12	Wellington
Try: Reginald Taylor; Pen: Leonard Stohr		Try: E. Fisher, Beethoven Algar; Con: Edward Roberts; Drop: Beethoven Algar

Victoria Park, Stratford
Attendance: 2,500
Referee: George Nicholson (Auckland)

=== 1919 ===
30 August 1919

Wellington	21–8	Canterbury
Try: J.M. McArthur (2), M.C. Corner, H. Elliot, W.T. Ryan; Con: R. Green (2), Edward Roberts		Try: L. Buchanan, E. Cummings; Con: H. Davis

Athletic Park, Wellington
Attendance: 9,500
Referee: T.H. Jones (Wellington)

6 September 1919

Wellington	18–10	Taranaki
Try: M.C. Corner, Beethoven Algar, Albert de Clifton; Con: Edward Roberts; Pen: Edward Roberts; Drop: Edward Roberts		Try: F.H. Masters, A.E. Spratt; Con: S.D. George (2)

Athletic Park, Wellington
Attendance: 5,500
Referee: E.N. Tregear (Wanganui)

13 September 1919

Wellington	23–9	Canterbury
Try: Sydney Shearer, Jack Shearer, N.A.J. Barker, Beethoven Algar; Con: R. Green (3), J.T. Tilyard; Drop: R. Green		Pen: H. Davis (2); Drop: H. Davis

Addington Showgrounds, Christchurch
Attendance: 5,000
Referee: J.F. Peake (Canterbury)

17 September 1919

Wellington	24–3	Auckland
Try: Beethoven Algar, Albert de Clifton, M.C. Corner, R.J. Paton, N.A.J. Barker, J.T. Tilyard; Con: Edward Roberts; Drop: F.A. Malin		Try: M.R. Grierson

Athletic Park, Wellington
Attendance: 10,000
Referee: A.F.R. Crawford (Wellington)

4 October 1919

Wellington	30–3	Wanganui
Try: N.A.J. Barker (2), Umberto Calcinai (2), Sydney Shearer (2), Jack Shearer, J.T. Tilyard; Con: F.A. Malin, Sydney Shearer, Jack Shearer		Try: A. Campion

Athletic Park, Wellington
Attendance: 6,000
Referee: Alfred Neilson (Wellington)
