= Kiosk, New Plymouth =

Heritage buliding in Pukekura Park, New Plymouth, New Zealand

Kiosk at Pukekura Park
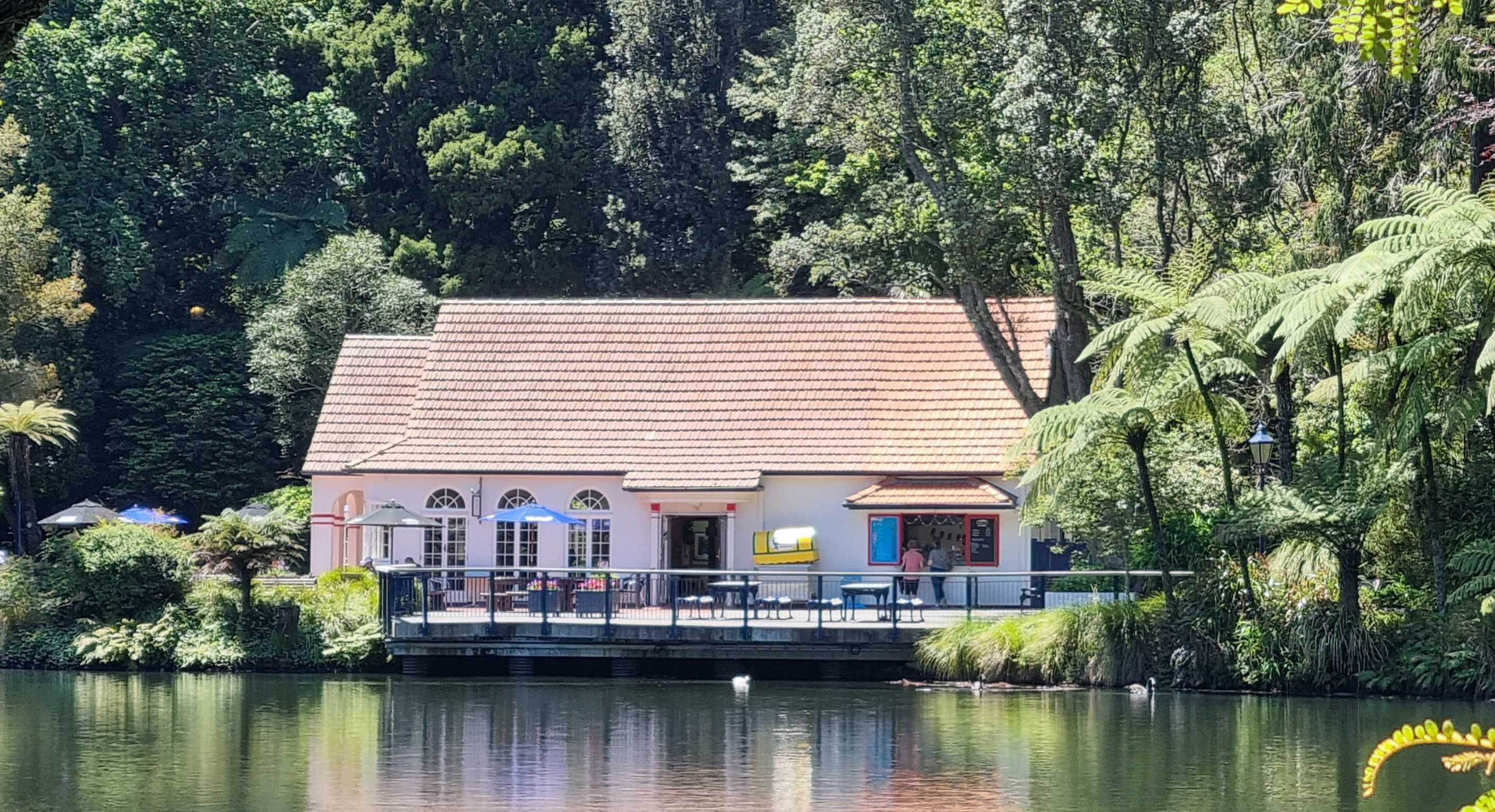
- View of the Kiosk in Pukekura Park, New Plymouth
- Alternative names: Tea House, Teahouse

General information
- Location: Pukekura Park, New Plymouth, New Zealand, 10 Fillis Street
- Coordinates: 39.064320°S 174.078654°E
- Completed: 1905
- Inaugurated: November 1905
- Renovated: 1931

Design and construction
- Architects: J. A. Maisey; Surrey S. Alleman

Heritage New Zealand – Category 2
- Designated: 1 September 1983
- Reference no.: 897

The Kiosk, now widely known as The Tea House, is a historic café situated alongside the main lake in New Plymouth's Pukekura Park. Originally built in 1905, re-built and gifted to the city in 1931, it is recognized by Heritage New Zealand as a Category 2 Historic Place.

== History ==
The history of the Tea House began in 1905, when the Park Board recognised that the women of New Plymouth lacked a comfortable, respectable place to gather within the Recreation Ground. Their need was clear enough that the Board resolved to act, and soon an article appeared in the Taranaki Herald announcing plans for a “neatly designed and convenient” ladies’ room and tea kiosk. Money, however, was scarce. The committee could spare only £15 and some leftover building materials. Salvation came from the town’s master builders, who offered to supply all labour free of charge. Even so, another £25 was needed, and the committee publicly urged the women of the town to rally together and raise the balance. Architect J. A. Maisey prepared the plans for an elegant little structure with retiring rooms, spacious verandas, and a 10 × 15 ft tea room fitted with sliding doors for larger gatherings. A large copper was included for boiling water during public events. By September 1905, the Board was already using the new building for meetings, and in November, the Tea Rooms opened under the supervision of Mrs Connop. J. A. Maisey left New Plymouth that same year, making the Tea House one of his final local works.

By 1919, the little Tea House was showing its age. Mayor Mr Burgess pledged two years of his mayoral honorarium, plus an additional £100, to help fund a replacement—an impressive £400 in total. Yet even this was not enough; the Board could only afford minor improvements in 1921. The dream of a new Tea House lingered for another decade. At last, in 1931, the Park received the Tea House it had long hoped for. This time, the project was driven not by the Board but by Mr and Mrs Burgess themselves. Mrs Burgess personally oversaw the tendering process and selected the design of Surrey S. Alleman, an Inglewood born architect. Builder Frank Hartnell was engaged to bring the design to life. The invested mayoral honorarium – now worth £430 – was put toward construction costs. The new Tea House opened on 14 November 1931 with a grand ceremony. The Burgesses gifted the building to the city in honour of their Golden Wedding Anniversary. The structure cost around £1000, and the couple went further still, donating £150 for furnishings and later £60 for silverware. Before construction began, the old bathing shed and the original Tea House were moved along the path toward the Fernery. The old Tea House was repurposed as a ladies’ rest room and the curator’s office.

The Tea House has moved through many custodians since Mrs Connop first took charge in 1905, each leaving their own imprint on its long life as a gathering place in Pukekura Park. Together with the Band Rotunda, the Queen Victoria Monument, the boat steps and the waterfall, it forms the central social hub of the park.

== Image gallery ==
The Kiosk with view of Mount Taranaki in the background

The Kiosk (Tea House) in Pukekura Park

Queen Victoria Monument and Kiosk

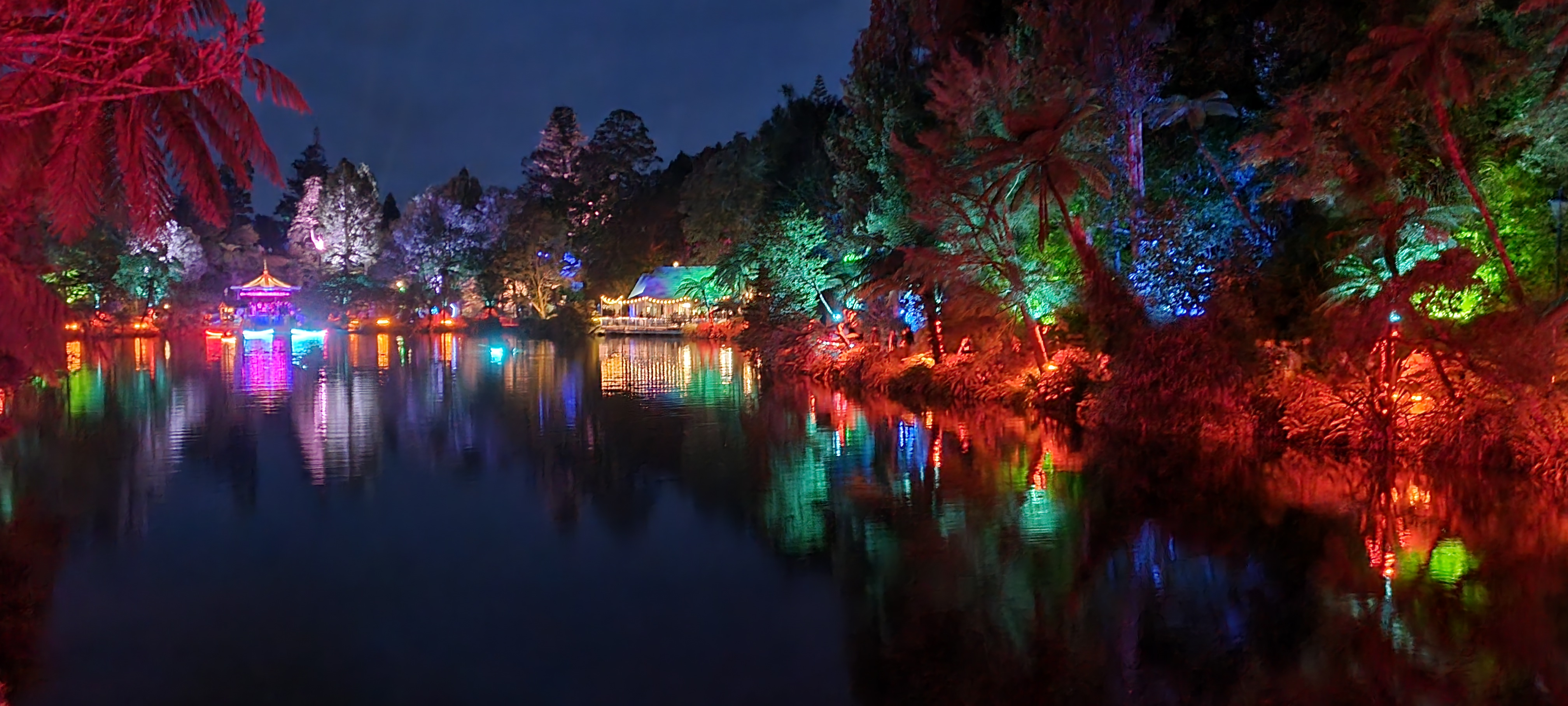
The lake, Band Rotunda and The Kiosk during the Festival of Lights

The Kiosk (Tea House) interior

Kiosk (Tea House) information panel
