= Jack Shearer =

Jack Shearer may refer to:

- Jack Shearer (priest) (1926–2001), Church of Ireland clergyman
- Jack Shearer (rugby union) (1896–1963), New Zealand rugby union player
- Jack Shearer (born 1944), American actor, known for Star Trek: First Contact
