= 1938 Auckland City mayoral election =

Local elections in New Zealand

- 11 May 1938
- Turnout: 40,718 (61.50%)
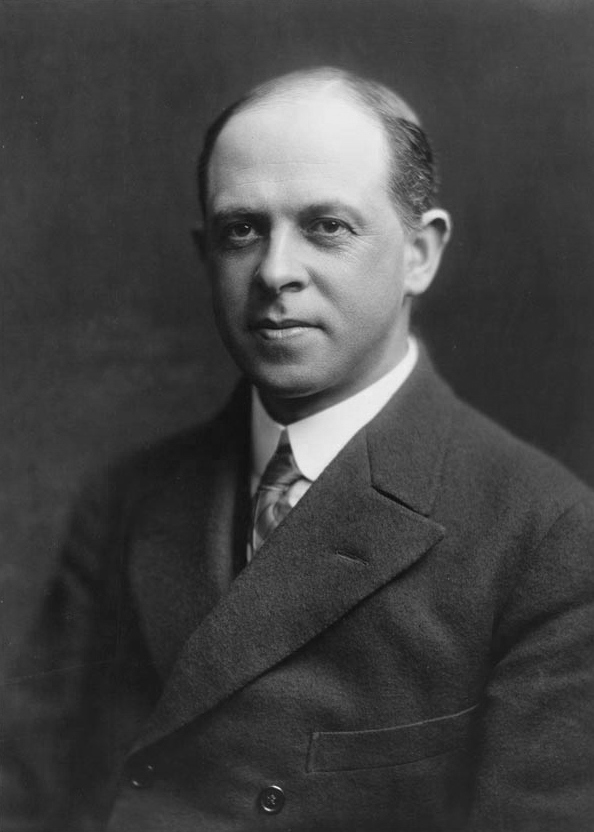

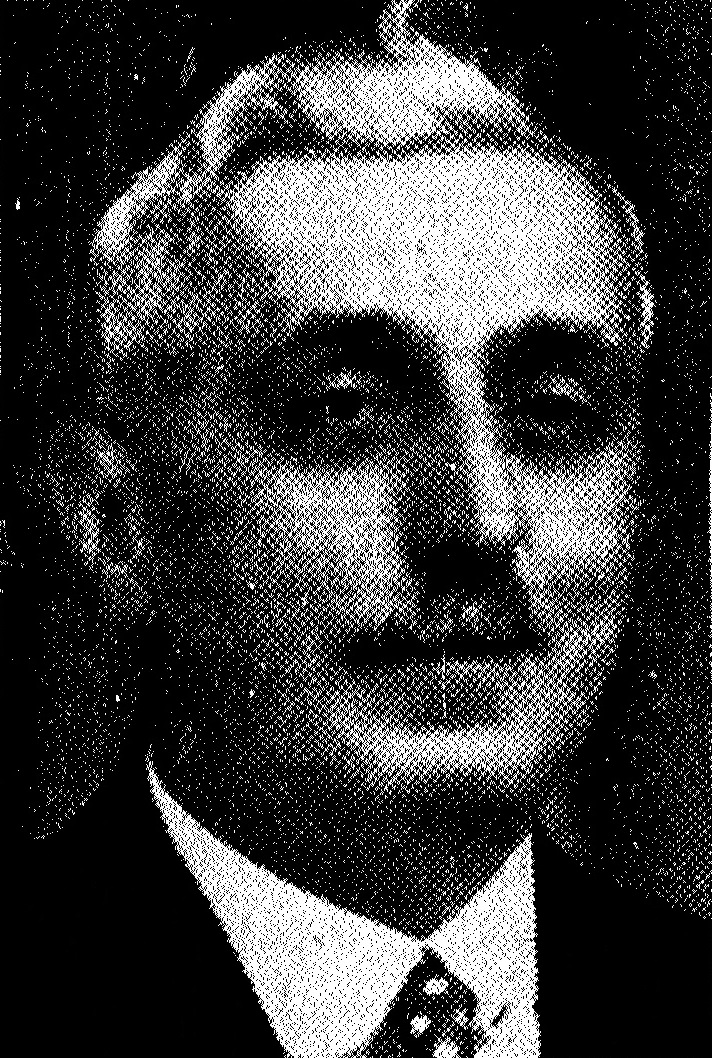
Candidate	Sir Ernest Davis	Joe Sayegh
Party	Citizens & Ratepayers	Labour
Popular vote	26,176	13,689
Percentage	64.28	33.61
Mayor before election
Sir Ernest Davis
Elected mayor
Sir Ernest Davis

The 1938 Auckland City mayoral election was part of the New Zealand local elections held that same year. In 1938, elections were held for the Mayor of Auckland plus other local government positions including twenty-one city councillors. The polling was conducted using the standard first-past-the-post electoral method.

The election saw incumbent mayor Sir Ernest Davis re-elected, increasing his majority in the process. The Labour Party again stood councillor Joe Sayegh (who was only narrowly defeated by Davis in 1935) as their candidate.

== Candidates ==
Citizens & Ratepayers
The incumbent mayor Sir Ernest Davis accepted the wishes of a deputation of citizens led by William R. Fee, the president of the Auckland Chamber of Commerce.

Labour
Two people were nominated for the Labour Party nomination to contest the mayoralty; the deputy mayor Bernard Martin and councillor Joe Sayegh (who stood for mayor in 1935). At a delegates meeting of the Auckland Labour Representation Committee Sayegh was selected as Labour's mayoral candidate.

== Campaign ==
Prior to the election several long serving Labour members of the city council were unexpectedly denied re-nomination. Ted Phelan, Arthur Rosser and George Gordon Grant were de-selected in the party selection process. Rosser ran for re-election regardless as an independent, but was defeated. The following year he was expelled from the Labour Party for standing against official party candidates. The Citizens & Ratepayers regained their majority on the city council and Sir George Richardson was appointed deputy mayor. However, Richardson died a month later and was succeeded as deputy mayor by John Allum. Richardson's death triggered a by-election which saw his seat gained by Labour Party candidate Charles Bailey, a former councillor who had lost his seat.

== Mayoralty results ==
1938 Auckland mayoral election
Party	Candidate	Votes	%	±%
Citizens & Ratepayers	Sir Ernest Davis	26,176	64.28	+25.97
Labour	Joe Sayegh	13,689	33.61	−3.75
Independent	James William Payne	369	0.90	
Informal votes		484	1.18	−0.15
Majority		12,487	30.66	+29.69
Turnout		40,718	61.50	+1.14

== Councillor results ==
1938 Auckland local election
Party	Candidate	Votes	%	±%
Citizens & Ratepayers	Arthur Bailey	22,996	56.47	
Labour	Joe Sayegh	21,310	52.33	−7.49
Citizens & Ratepayers	Leonard Coakley	21,018	51.61	+3.83
Citizens & Ratepayers	John Allum	20,356	49.99	
Citizens & Ratepayers	Ellen Melville	19,982	49.07	+6.71
Citizens & Ratepayers	Reginald Judson	19,756	48.51	
Citizens & Ratepayers	James Donald	19,642	48.23	
Citizens & Ratepayers	Sir George Richardson	19,540	47.98	+2.43
Citizens & Ratepayers	Harold Burton	19,310	47.42	+5.33
Labour	Mary Dreaver	19,225	47.21	
Citizens & Ratepayers	William J. Campbell	18,793	46.15	
Labour	Bill Anderton	18,694	45.91	−7.68
Citizens & Ratepayers	Howey Walker	18,237	44.78	
Labour	Jeremiah James Sullivan	18,187	44.66	
Citizens & Ratepayers	William R. Fee	17,900	43.96	
Labour	Richard Armstrong	17,849	43.83	
Labour	Ernest Frank Andrews	17,839	43.81	−5.47
Citizens & Ratepayers	Roy McElroy	17,642	43.32	
Labour	Peter Carr	17,621	43.27	−2.63
Citizens & Ratepayers	Alan Brown	17,513	43.01	
Citizens & Ratepayers	John W. Kealy	17,407	42.75	+12.12
Labour	John Albert Mason	17,268	42.40	−12.04
Citizens & Ratepayers	Arthur Watkins	17,261	42.39	
Labour	Fred Young	17,230	42.31	
Citizens & Ratepayers	Harry Butcher (Note: Butcher was appointed in September 1940 to fill a vacancy on the council)	17,211	42.26	
Labour	Bernard Martin	17,032	41.82	−2.31
Labour	Norman Douglas	16,934	41.58	−0.55
Citizens & Ratepayers	Harry Merritt	16,672	40.94	
Labour	John Stewart	16,364	40.18	−3.47
Labour	Elizabeth Wynn	16,352	40.15	
Citizens & Ratepayers	Ada McNair	15,999	39.29	
Labour	Jim Purtell	15,973	39.22	−2.04
Labour	Thomas Long	15,782	38.75	
Labour	Charles James Matthew	15,602	38.31	
Labour	Joseph Glen Kennerley	15,536	38.15	
Labour	James Jude	15,344	37.68	
Labour	Harry Gordon Staley	14,955	36.72	−1.96
Labour	Charles Bailey	14,239	34.96	−15.41
Independent	Tom Bloodworth	10,788	26.49	−17.84
Independent	Amy Kasper	8,625	21.18	
Independent	Alice Basten	8,193	20.12	−21.49
Independent	Arthur Rosser	6,920	16.99	−36.71
Independent	John Barr Patterson	5,647	13.86	−23.51
Independent	Jessie Darlow	5,007	12.29	
Independent	Ernest Cross	3,663	8.99	
Independent	James Haslam	3,162	7.76	
Independent	Gerald Bell	3,042	7.47	
Independent	Walter Davis	2,737	6.72	
Independent	Sydney James Ryan	2,441	5.99	
Independent	Maungatai Babbington	2,408	5.91	−1.71
Independent	Charles Edward Phillips	2,231	5.47	

Table footnotes:
