= Surrey S. Alleman =

Architect

Surrey Sebastian Alleman (31 August 1901 – 17 April 1978) was a New Zealand architect based in Auckland, noted for designing the Hampton Court Flats in central Auckland and the Garden Court Flats on Tamaki Drive in Mission Bay.

== Early life ==
Surrey S. Alleman was born in Kaponga, Taranaki, on 31 August 1901 and attended New Plymouth Boys' High School. He studied architecture at Auckland University College in the mid-1920s, passing exams for membership of the New Zealand Institute of Architects in December 1926 and associateship the following year. He set up in sole practice in 1928, then later worked in various partnerships.

== Ye Old Pirate Shippe ==
One of Alleman's early projects was 'Ye Olde Pirate Shippe', an entertainment venue in Milford, Auckland which opened in December 1928. Alleman designed the building in the shape of a pirate ship, and with some partners set up a company called 'Milford Amusements Ltd' to fund the project. The building had two dance floors suspended on rubber for resilience, a dining area and an outdoor supper area on the poop deck. It opened with a private party on 21 December 1928. Some residents were opposed to the ship, saying it would "lower the moral tone of Milford", so the Takapuna Borough Council ordered that dancing in bathing costumes and dancing on Sundays would be prohibited. The venue was demolished in 1957. In 2017 a new playground was developed at the beach. In response to the wishes of residents who wanted to remember Ye Olde Pirate Shippe, the playground features a ship coming out of the sand.

== Hampton Court Flats ==
Alleman was awarded the NZIA Gold Medal for 1930 for his design for the Hampton Court Flats in Auckland - he was 29 years old at the time.

== Garden Court Flats ==
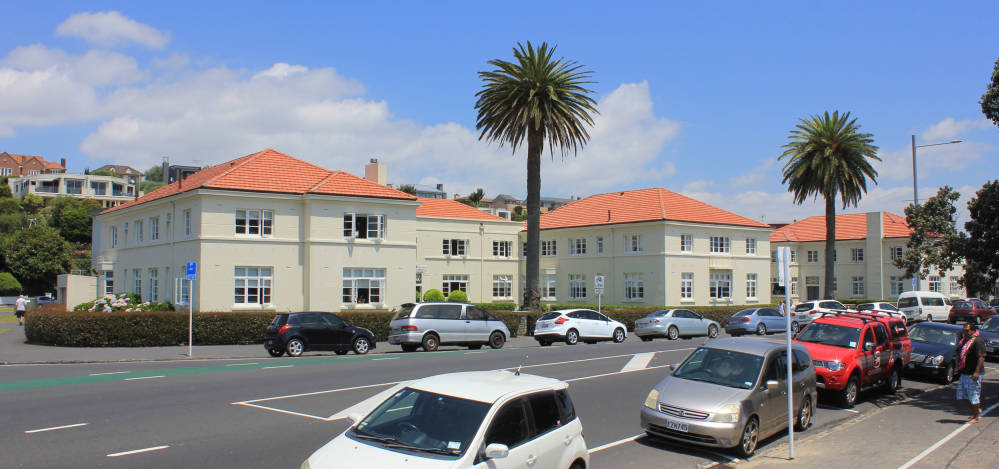
Garden Court flats on Tamaki Drive, Mission Bay

Another housing block designed by Alleman was the Garden Court Flats on Tamaki Drive in Mission Bay, completed in 1936. There were 20 self-contained one- and two-bedroom flats and eight garages in the block. The flats featured numerous modern conveniences including disappearing cutting and ironing boards, refrigerators, and bathrooms with large built-in baths, pedestal basins and medicine cabinets. The lounge and dining room could be combined into one large area for entertaining. Each flat had sea views towards Rangitoto and good sun.

== Other work ==
Other buildings designed by Alleman include the Kiosk (Tea House) in Pukekura Park, New Plymouth (1931), the Otahuhu Civic Centre (1946), Tappenden Motors on Stanley St in Parnell (1955), Kawerau Bus and Taxi Station (1957), Helena Rubenstein factory in Onehunga (1959), Taupo Police Station (1962) and Northcote and West Tamaki Post Offices (1965). He also designed private residences, including a large Spanish Mission-style homestead on Puketutu Island (1930), and his own Arts and Crafts-style home at 20 Ridings Road, Remuera, in the late 1920s. This two-storey house has a brick base, cedar weatherboards and tiled roof. Its features include panelled wood walls and three different patterns of lead lights.

== Personal life ==
Alleman married Nancy Biss in 1929. He retired in 1967 and died on 17 April 1978.
