= Band Rotunda, New Plymouth =

Heritage bandstand in Pukekura Park, New Plymouth, New Zealand

Band Rotunda
- Bandstand
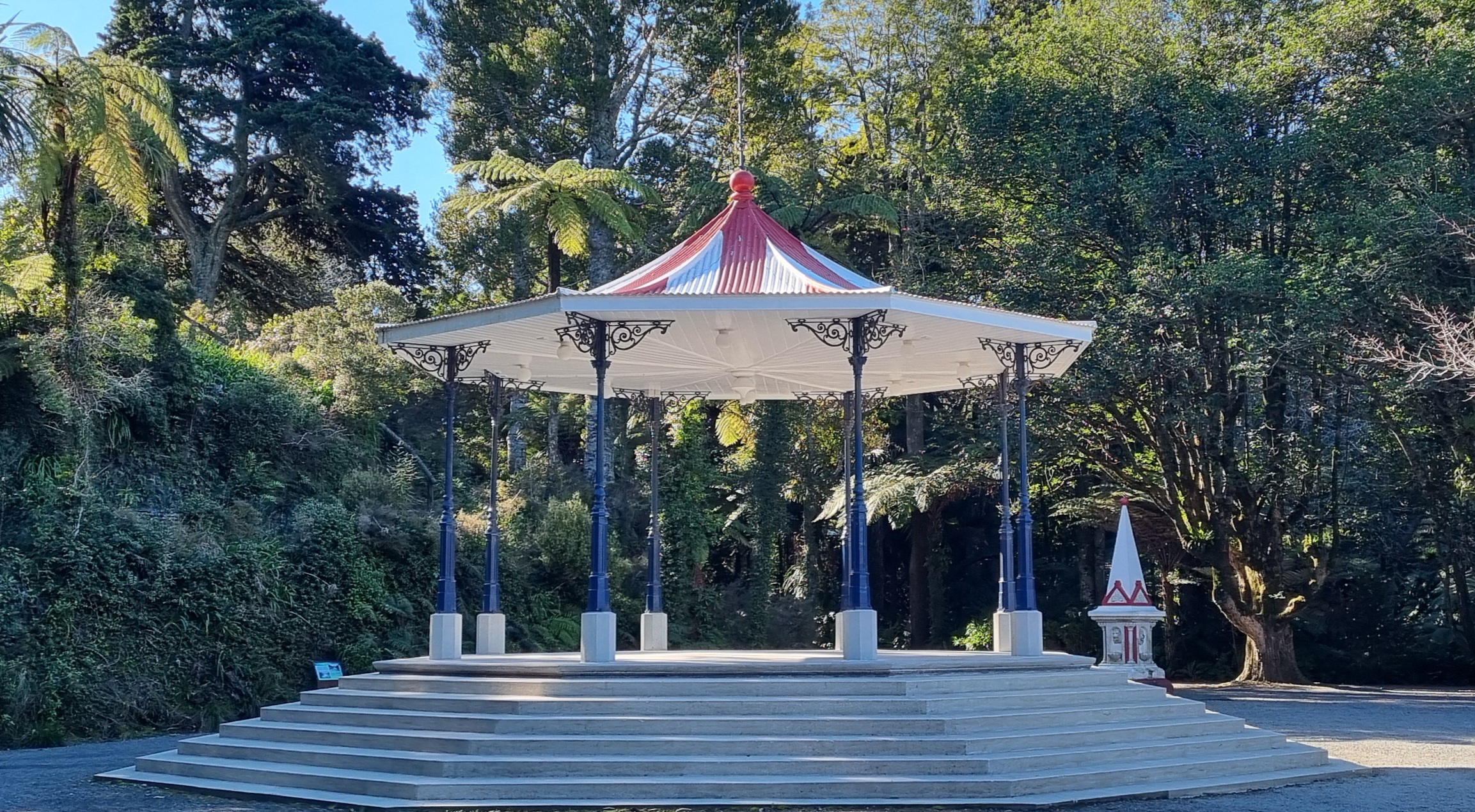
- Band Rotunda & Queen Victoria Monument in Pukekura Park, New Plymouth
- Design: James Sanderson
- Constructed: 1885-1891
- Opened: 31 March 1891
- Location: New Plymouth, New Zealand; Pukekura Park, 10 Fillis Street
- Interactive map of Band Rotunda
- Coordinates: 39.064300°S 174.078664°E

Heritage New Zealand – Category 2
- Designated: 1 September 1983
- Reference no.: 882

Band Rotunda in Pukekura Park, New Plymouth, is one of New Zealand's oldest surviving lakeside bandstands. Completed in 1891, it is a Category 2 Historic Place that remains a central fixture for concerts, community events and seasonal festivals.

== History ==
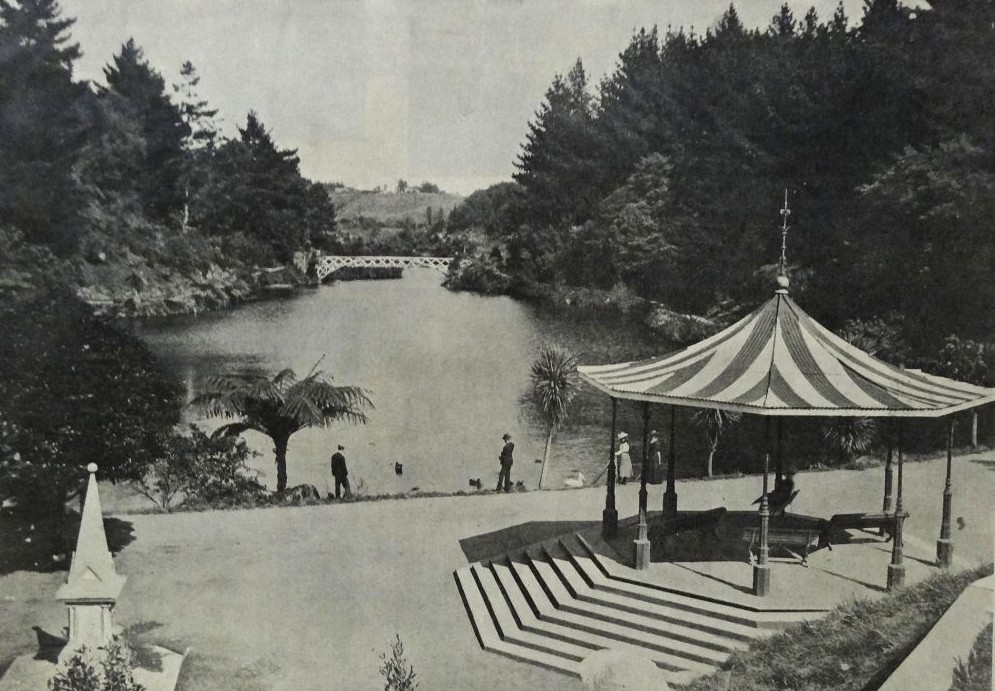
Pukekura Park with Band Rotunda, Queen Victoria Monument and Poet’s Bridge in 1905

Plans for a band rotunda in Pukekura Park began in 1882, when architect Henry J. T. Edmonds proposed an "ornamental" pavilion for the park. Though the "Recreation Ground Board" loved the idea, the local town band refused to help fund it, so the project stalled for several years. By 1885, the board revived the plan, deciding to build it in stages as money allowed. They chose a prominent spot on the south face of Cannon Hill, which required a massive engineering effort: a large portion of the hill had to be cut back, a giant pine tree felled, and 151 yards of earth moved to level the site. This excavated soil was not wasted, it was used to raise the nearby pathway by the Lily Pond.

Local architect James Sanderson provided plans, a design that balanced elegance and economy. The board ordered decorative ironwork and pillars from Scott Brothers’ Atlas Foundry in Christchurch. The foundry's quote was initially too costly for the board, which asked if the ironwork could be supplied in instalments; Scott Brothers agreed, and the order was placed. The project finally gained momentum through a series of community fund-raisers, including fancy-dress balls and fireworks displays. Even so, progress was slow. The concrete base was completed by contractor H. Hooker in 1887, just in time to be used by a band for the Golden Jubilee of Queen Victoria.

After surviving two separate acts of vandalism, the project reached its final stretch in 1890 under a new architect, Arthur Mofflin. The cast iron components were shipped from Scott Brother's in Christchurch, and despite arriving "not as ordered," the board negotiated a price and rushed to finish construction for the Taranaki Jubilee. On 31 March 1891, the rotunda finally made its debut, hosting brass bands under a shower of celebratory fireworks for a crowd of over 5,000 people.

In 2013, the rotunda underwent a major restoration where the concrete base was re-plastered and the roof repainted in its historically accurate red and white stripes. Today, the rotunda remains a park centrepiece, serving as a focal point for community events, concerts, and the Festival of Lights.

== Description ==
The Band Rotunda, positioned beside the lake to amplify sound naturally, features an octagonal concrete base and eight cast iron pillars filled with charcoal powder to prevent rust. The entrance was by four steps which were continued all around the bandstand. The structure has a conical roof supported by pillars, with decorative iron railings. The domed roof is painted with red and white stripes.

The rotunda, a relic of Victorian leisure architecture, completed in 1891, is considered one of the oldest remaining bandstands in New Zealand, and holds a Heritage New Zealand Category II classification.

== Image gallery ==
Band Rotunda

Brass Band concert

Brass Band concert

Brass Band concert

Brass Band concert
