= 1944 Auckland City mayoral election =

New Zealand mayoral election

← 1941	27 May 1944	1947 →
- Turnout: 37,011 (51.50%)
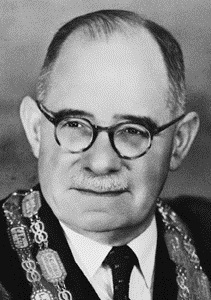

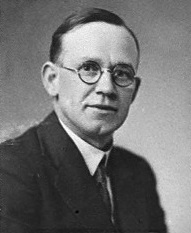
Candidate	John Allum	Bill Anderton
Party	Citizens & Ratepayers	Labour
Popular vote	17,712	11,319
Percentage	47.85	30.58
Mayor before election
John Allum
Elected mayor
John Allum

The 1944 Auckland City mayoral election was part of the New Zealand local elections held that same year. In 1944, elections were held for the Mayor of Auckland plus other local government positions including twenty-one city councillors. The polling was conducted using the standard first-past-the-post electoral method.

== Background ==
Citizens & Ratepayers
The Citizens & Ratepayers Association selected incumbent mayor John Allum to contest the mayoralty for a second term.

Labour
The Labour Party had three people nominated for the mayoralty:

- Bill Anderton, MP for Eden since 1935 and former city councillor (1935–41)
- Mary Dreaver, A city councillor since 1938 and former MP for Waitemata (1941–43)
- Joe Sayegh, Labour's mayoral candidate at the previous three elections and former city councillor (1933–41)

Despite a recent announcement that Sayegh had declined to be a candidate for any public office at the elections his name was put forward by the Auckland East branch of the Labour Party. At the candidate selection meeting Anderton was selected as Labour's mayoral candidate.

Others
Victor Macky, a member of the Auckland Hospital Board, announced his intention to stand as an independent mayoral candidate. His wife Edna had stood unsuccessfully for the city council in 1929.

== Mayoralty results ==
1944 Auckland mayoral election
Party	Candidate	Votes	%	±%
Citizens & Ratepayers	John Allum	17,712	47.85	−1.75
Labour	Bill Anderton	11,319	30.58	
Independent	Victor Macky	7,662	20.70	
Informal votes		318	0.85	+0.07
Majority		6,393	17.27	+13.20
Turnout		37,011	51.50	+0.31

== Councillor results ==
1944 Auckland local election
Party	Candidate	Votes	%	±%
Citizens & Ratepayers	Leonard Coakley	20,471	55.31	+3.10
Citizens & Ratepayers	Reginald Judson	19,735	53.32	+3.27
Citizens & Ratepayers	Wilfred Fortune	19,716	53.27	+6.62
Citizens & Ratepayers	Fred Ambler	19,391	52.39	+2.94
Citizens & Ratepayers	Harold Percy Burton	18,577	50.19	+2.33
Citizens & Ratepayers	Arthur Bailey	18,518	50.03	−0.94
Citizens & Ratepayers	Ellen Melville	18,394	49.69	+0.40
Citizens & Ratepayers	Claude James Lovegrove	18,293	49.42	+5.23
Citizens & Ratepayers	John W. Kealy	17,958	48.52	
Citizens & Ratepayers	Sidney Takle	17,955	48.51	+2.38
Citizens & Ratepayers	William Fowlds	17,895	48.35	+0.82
Citizens & Ratepayers	Alan St. Clair Brown	17,788	48.06	+3.57
Citizens & Ratepayers	Keith Buttle	17,643	47.66	+2.22
Citizens & Ratepayers	Frederick George Farrell	17,552	47.42	+3.06
Citizens & Ratepayers	Reginald Harrop	17,392	46.99	+3.11
Citizens & Ratepayers	Roy McElroy	17,348	46.87	+1.71
Citizens & Ratepayers	Joan Rattray	17,132	46.28	
Citizens & Ratepayers	Joyce William Hyland	16,359	44.20	
Citizens & Ratepayers	Howard Edward Gray Matthews	16,356	44.19	
Citizens & Ratepayers	Archibald Ewing Brownlie	15,965	43.13	
Citizens & Ratepayers	Michael Joseph Moodabe	15,696	42.40	−1.28
Labour	Mary Dreaver	15,558	42.03	−3.88
Labour	Bill Anderton	14,306	38.65	−3.32
Labour	Alfred Ernest Brownhill	13,462	36.37	
Labour	Jeremiah James Sullivan	13,341	36.04	−5.99
Labour	Donald Campbell	13,263	35.83	−3.63
Labour	Beatrice Joan Beer	13,063	35.29	
Labour	Paul Richardson	12,732	34.40	−4.54
Labour	Fred Young	12,629	34.12	−5.37
Labour	Elizabeth Wynn	12,563	33.94	−4.03
Labour	Alfred Gilbert	11,825	31.94	
Labour	Tom Skinner	11,700	31.61	
Labour	William Reginald Taylor	11,659	31.50	
Labour	Joseph Glen Kennerley	11,627	31.41	−4.62
Labour	Inez Freeman	11,542	31.18	
Labour	Raymond Hector Hieatt	11,534	31.16	
Labour	William Bekker	10,994	29.70	
Labour	Frank Williams	10,988	29.68	
Labour	Albert Harwood Berry	10,971	29.64	
Independent	Tom Bloodworth	8,779	23.71	
Communist	George Jackson	7,045	19.03	+13.35
Communist	Johnny Mitchell	6,550	17.69	
Independent	Charles Bailey	4,600	12.42	
Independent	Donald Wallace MacClure	3,756	10.14	
Independent	Dermott Hall Skelton	3,596	9.71	
Independent	Charles Patrick Belton	2,871	7.75	
Independent	Joseph Alexander Govan	2,315	6.25	
Independent	Albert John Mason	2,260	6.10	
Independent	James Alexander Ritchie	2,084	5.63	
Independent	Edward James Clark	2,050	5.53	
