= John W. Kealy =

New Zealand politician and lawyer (1902–1970)

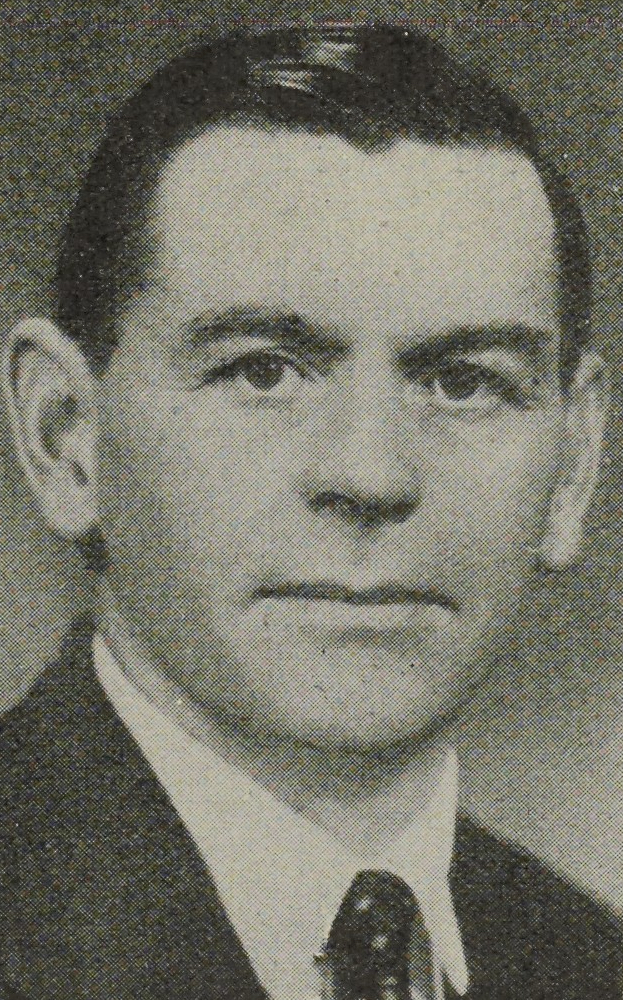
John W. Kealy

John William Kealy (1902–4 July 1970) was a New Zealand politician and lawyer.

== Biography ==
=== Early life and career ===
Kealy was born in Sydney in 1902. He was educated Auckland Grammar School and later the University of Auckland where he qualified as a lawyer. He worked in Saint Heliers, Auckland as a solicitor before becoming a magistrate. He also served at the secretary of Saint Heliers Presbyterian Church.

In 1940 he enlisted in the army and saw action in Greece and Egypt. From May 1948 to 1950 year, Kealy was the president of the New Zealand Library Association.

=== Political career ===
Kealy was elected to the Auckland City Council in 1927 although he lost his seat in 1929. Upon his election in 1927 at 25 years of age he was the youngest ever candidate elected to the council at that stage. He served two more separate spells on the Council from 1938 to 1941 and again from 1944 until 1950. He had previously been a member of the Avondale Borough Council and also a member of the Auckland and Suburban Drainage Board, Auckland Institute and Museum council and Auckland council of the New Zealand Institute of Horticulture.

Kealy was active in the Reform Party in the 1930s, a leader in its junior wing, and after the formation of the National Party he helped establish the Junior National Party in 1936. He was also a chairman at branch and electorate level in the National Party.

Kealy stood as the National Party's candidate for the seat of Auckland West in the 1938 general election against Labour Party Prime Minister Michael Joseph Savage, losing by over 8,000 votes. Upon Savage's death two years later neither he nor National contested the by-election for the seat. He did stand again at the 1943 general election, coming runner-up to Savage's successor Peter Carr by a lower majority of 5,402.
