= Queen Victoria Monument, New Plymouth =

Heritage drinking fountain in Pukekura Park, New Plymouth, New Zealand

Queen Victoria Monument
- Drinking Fountain
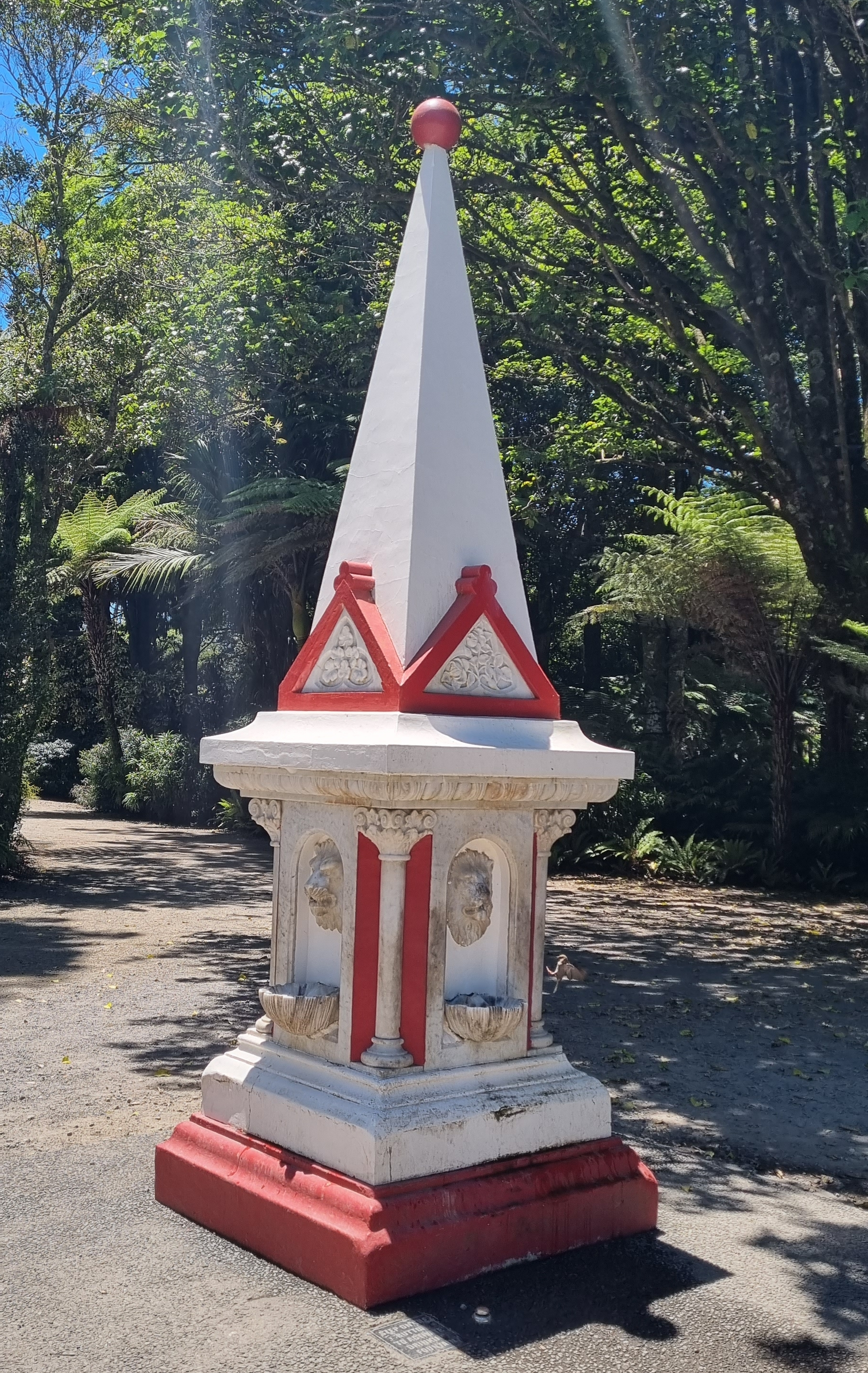
- Queen Victoria Monument in Pukekura Park
- Constructed: 1897
- Opened: 22 June 1897
- Location: New Plymouth, New Zealand; Pukekura Park, 10 Fillis Street
- Interactive map of Queen Victoria Monument
- Coordinates: 39.064176°S 174.078943°E

Heritage New Zealand – Category 2
- Designated: 1 September 1983
- Reference no.: 908

The Queen Victoria Monument in Pukekura Park, New Plymouth, is a historic marble drinking fountain, recognised by Heritage New Zealand as a Category 2 Historic Place. Built under G. W. Browne's supervision and crafted by stonemason J. Russell, the fountain was unveiled on 22 June 1897 to commemorate Queen Victoria's Diamond Jubilee.

== History ==
Towards the end of 1889, a Sports Ground Committee was established in New Plymouth with a clear mandate to develop the town's recreational grounds into a venue capable of hosting the full range of popular sports, including rugby and cricket. Over the course of seven years, the committee pursued this mission with steady determination. By the time its members judged their work complete, they resolved to dissolve the committee and return management of the grounds to the Recreation Ground Board.

Yet, upon dissolution, a small surplus remained in the committee's accounts. Rather than dispersing it quietly, the executors – N. K. McDiarmid and G. W. Browne – proposed that the funds be used for a new drinking fountain connected to the town water supply. They met with the Recreation Grounds Board and offered the £13 in hand as the foundation of a public subscription fund, estimating that approximately £50 would be required to realise the project. Agreement was reached swiftly. The fountain would be erected near the Band Rotunda, at the base of Cannon Hill, overlooking the Main Lake, and Mr Browne prepared the plans for the structure. Construction advanced under his supervision, even as public contributions arrived slowly.

As the Diamond Jubilee of Queen Victoria approached, celebrating her sixty years on the throne, the committee determined that the new fountain should serve as a commemorative gesture. On 22 June 1897, during the Jubilee festivities held in the grounds, the drinking fountain, crafted by stonemason J. Russell, was formally unveiled by Mr H. Brown, on behalf of the Sports Ground Committee.

Today, the area with the drinking fountain, the Band Rotunda, the Kiosk (Teahouse), the waterfall and the boat steps, is the main hub of the park.

== Description ==
According to the original plans prepared by Mr Browne, the drinking fountain is twelve feet in height, supported by marble columns and finished with marble facings. The structure features three lion's head spouts and remains a functional drinking station for park visitors today.

The monument reflects the Victorian era's influence on the park's early development and is one of four Heritage New Zealand listed historic places within the grounds.

== Image gallery ==
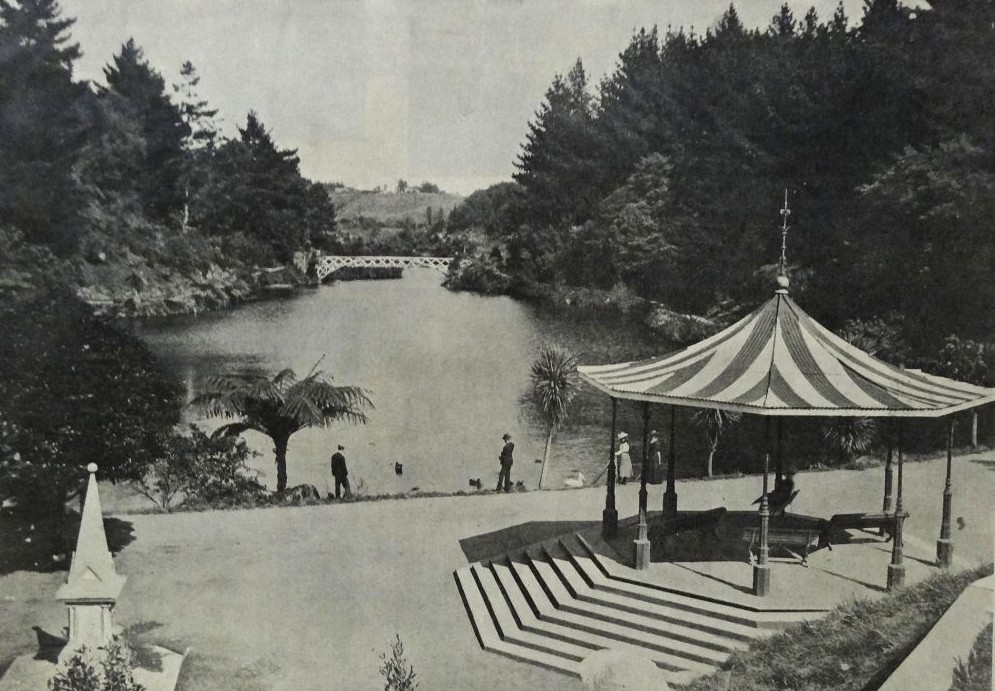
Pukekura Park with Queen Victoria Monument, Band Rotunda and Poet's Bridge in 1905

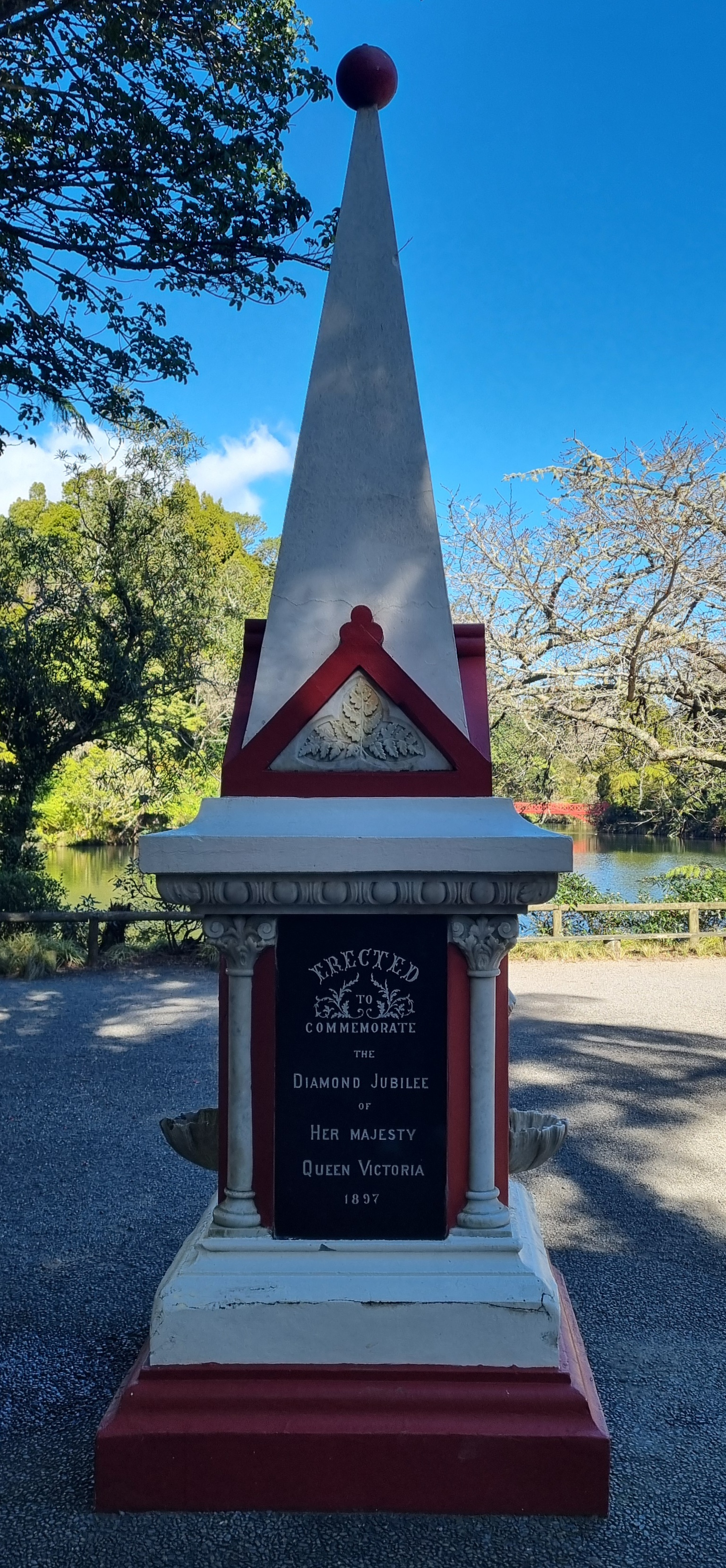
Queen Victoria Monument in Pukekura Park

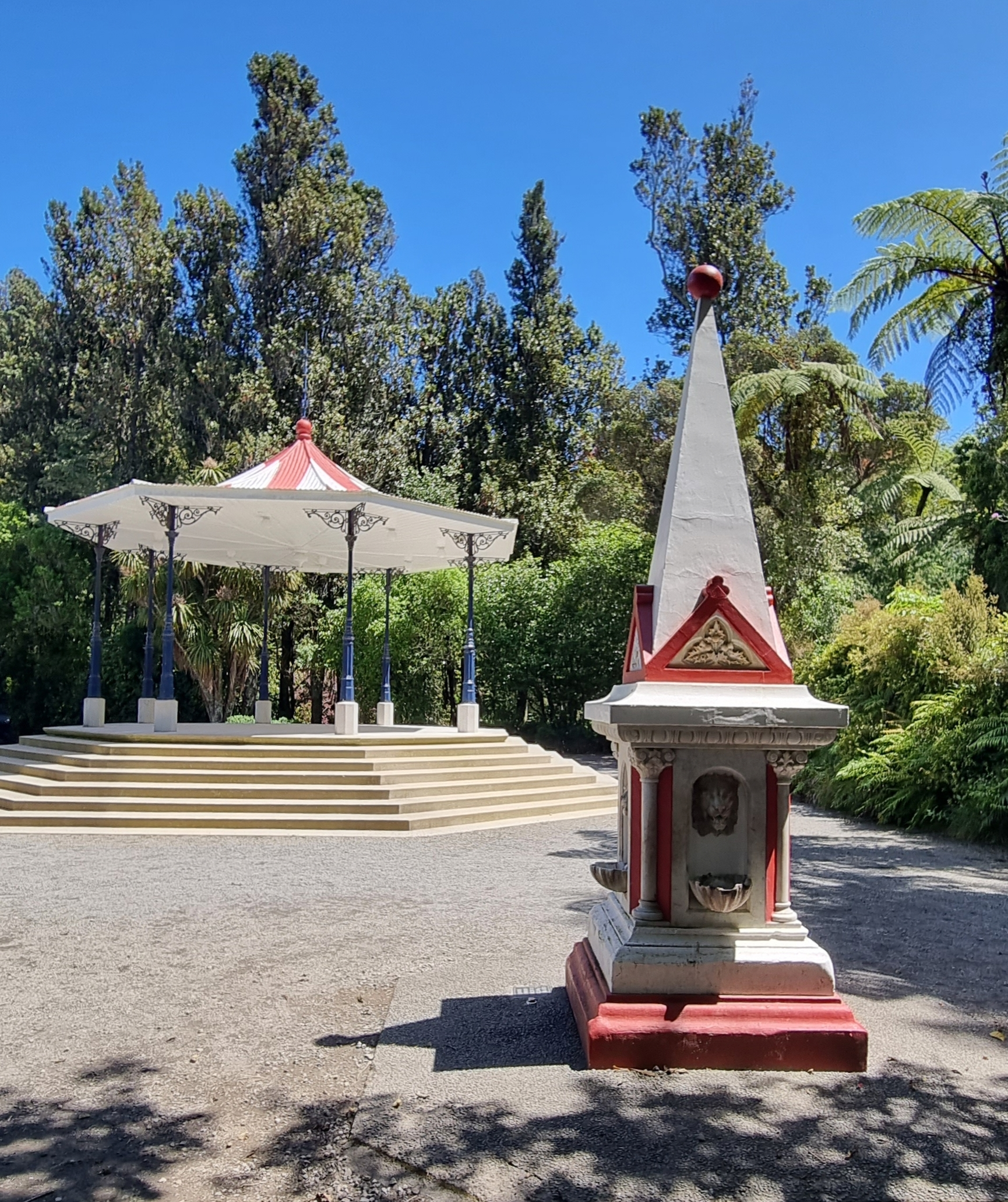
Queen Victoria Monument and Band Rotunda

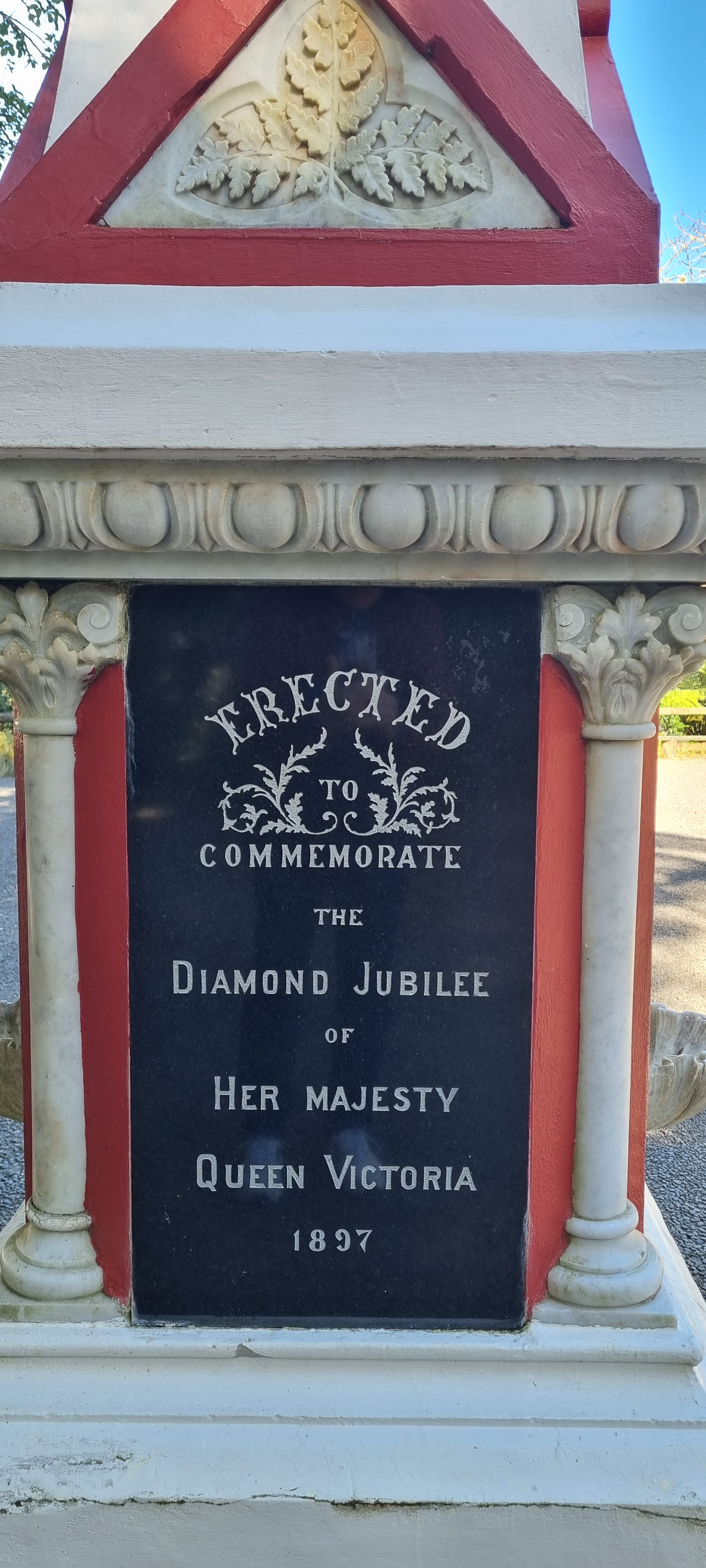
Queen Victoria Monument memorial plaque

Detail with the lion's head spouts
