= Victor Macky =

- Born: John Victor Macky; 3 September 1887 Auckland, New Zealand
- Died: 15 September 1951 (aged 64) Auckland, New Zealand
- School: Auckland Grammar School
- University: Auckland University College
- Occupation: Public accountant

Rugby union career
- Position: Wing
Provincial / State sides
Years	Team	Apps	(Points)
1911–14	Auckland	17	(73)
International career
Years	Team	Apps	(Points)
1913	New Zealand	1	(0)

John Victor Macky (3 September 1887 – 15 September 1951) was a New Zealand rugby union player.

== Biography ==
A wing three-quarter, Macky represented Auckland at a provincial level. He played one match for the New Zealand national side, the All Blacks: a test in 1913 against the touring Australian side at Carisbrook in Dunedin.

Macky served in France with the 1st New Zealand Expeditionary Force (NZEF) during World War I, having enlisted December 1916. In January 1919 he was commissioned second lieutenant, temporary captain, as an instructor in the NZEF education scheme. He returned to New Zealand and was discharged in late 1919.

His grandfather, Reverend John Macky, was the first moderator of the Presbyterian General Assembly of New Zealand. In 1920 Macky married Edna Graham Allan in Dunedin.

Macky was active in civic affairs in Auckland. He served as a member of the Auckland Hospital Board, and chaired that body's finance committee. He also served as vice-chairman of the Auckland Grammar Schools Board, vice-president of the Auckland YMCA, and chairman of the Auckland Vocational Guidance Advisory Council. In 1944, Macky stood as an independent candidate for the mayoralty of Auckland City. He polled well but finished third, behind the incumbent, John Allum, and Labour MP Bill Anderton. His wife Edna had stood unsuccessfully for the city council in 1929.

Macky died in Auckland on 15 September 1951, and was buried near his grandfather in the churchyard of St Johns Presbyterian Church in Papatoetoe.
