= Jack Stohr =

New Zealand rugby union player

- Born: Leonard Stohr; 13 November 1889 New Plymouth, New Zealand
- Died: 25 July 1973 (aged 83) Johannesburg, South Africa
- School: New Plymouth Boys' High School

Rugby union career
- Position: Three-quarter
Provincial / State sides
Years	Team	Apps	(Points)
1908–1914	Taranaki		
International career
Years	Team	Apps	(Points)
1910–1913	New Zealand	3	(6)

Leonard "Jack" Stohr (13 November 1889 – 25 July 1973) was a New Zealand rugby union player. A three-quarter, Stohr represented Taranaki at a provincial level, and was a member of the New Zealand national side, the All Blacks, in 1910 and 1913. He played 15 matches for the All Blacks including three internationals. Stohr served in the New Zealand Medical Corps during World War I, during which he was also involved with Services rugby in Britain. Following the war, he was a member of the New Zealand Army team that won the King's Cup in 1919 against other British Empire teams, and then toured South Africa. He returned to New Zealand in 1919, but moved to South Africa the following year, and lived there for the rest of his life.
