= Festival of Lights (New Plymouth) =

New Zealand event

Coordinates: 39°3′52″S 174°4′46″E

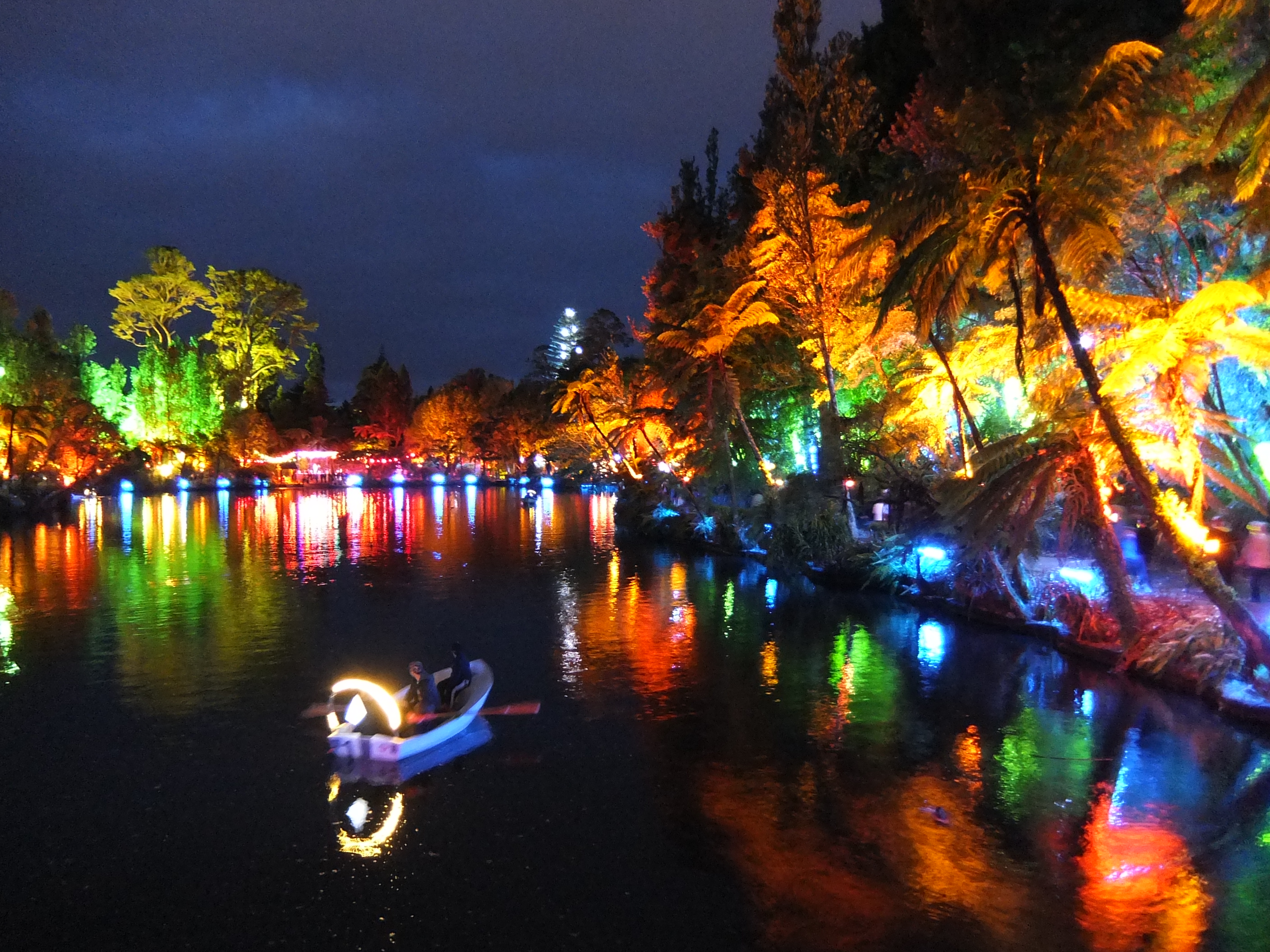
Pukekura Park, New Plymouth, New Zealand, illuminated during the annual Festival of Lights.

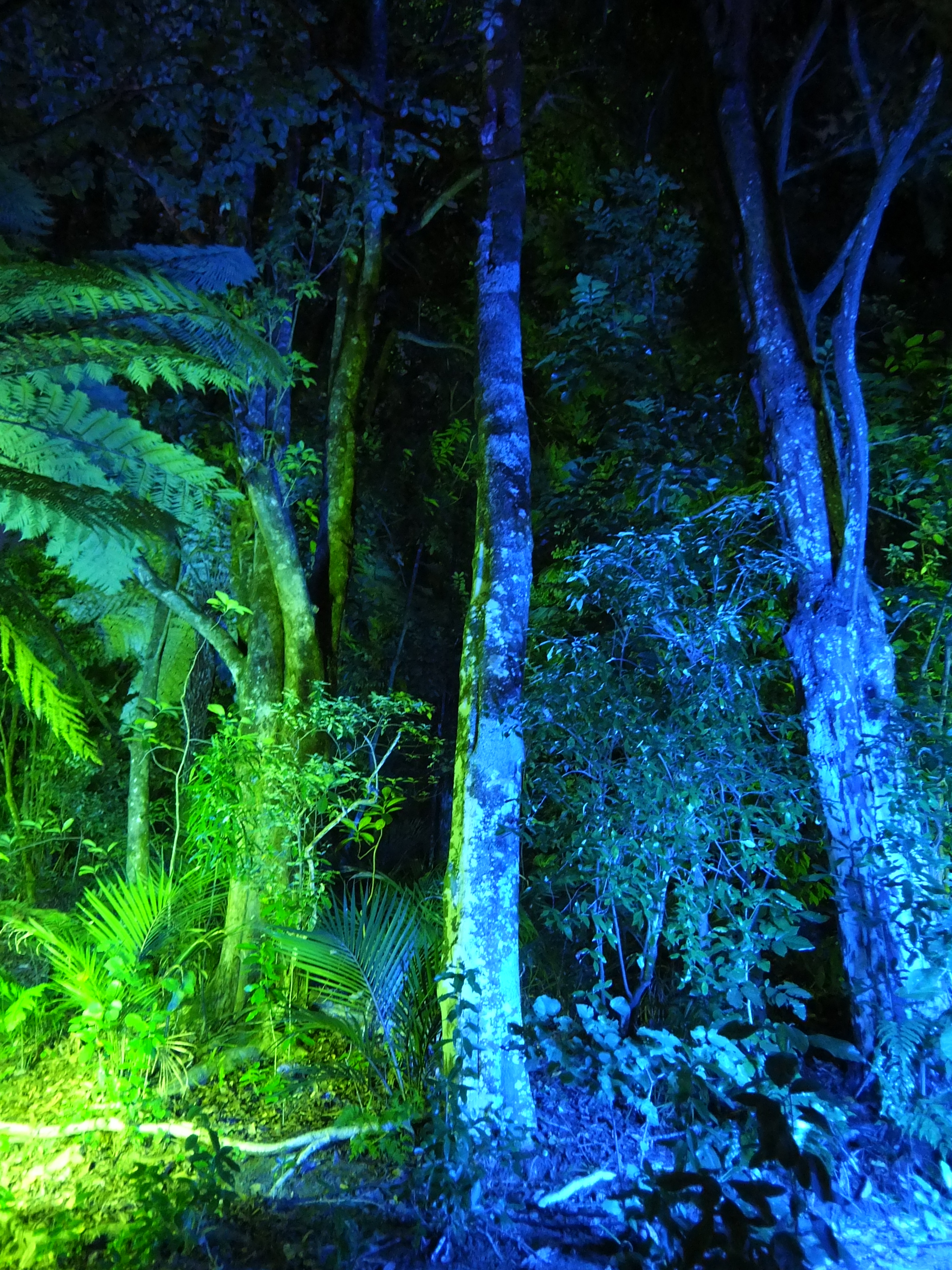
Pukekura Park, New Plymouth, New Zealand, illuminated during the annual Festival of Lights.

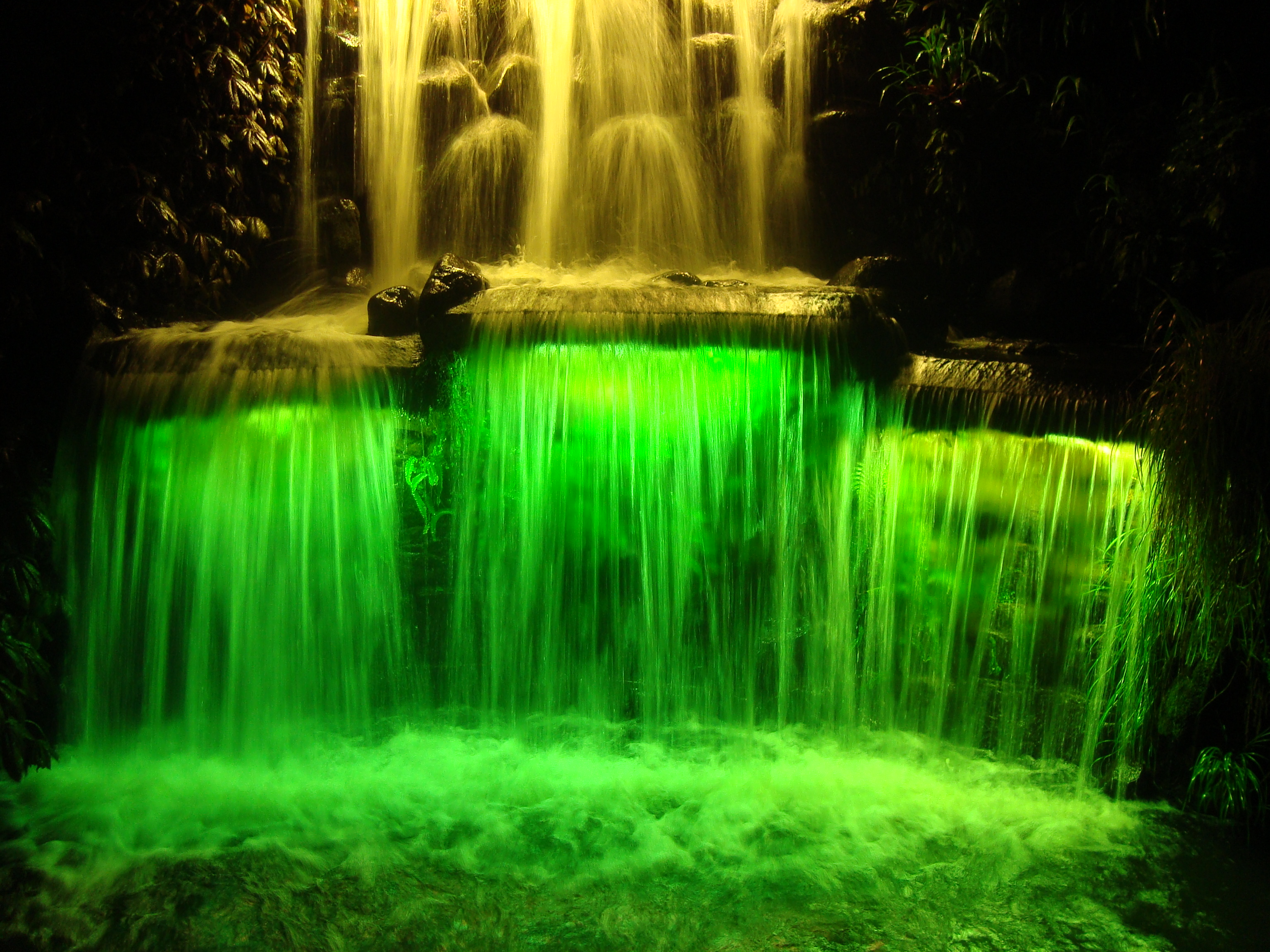
Waterfall lights

The TSB Festival of Lights is an annual event held in Pukekura Park, New Plymouth, New Zealand. Running for free every year from mid-December to late January, it has a daytime and night time programme of events for people of all ages, with light installations illuminating the park. In 2021 the festival won the Best Local Government and NZ's Favourite Event Awards at the 2021 NZ Events Association Awards.

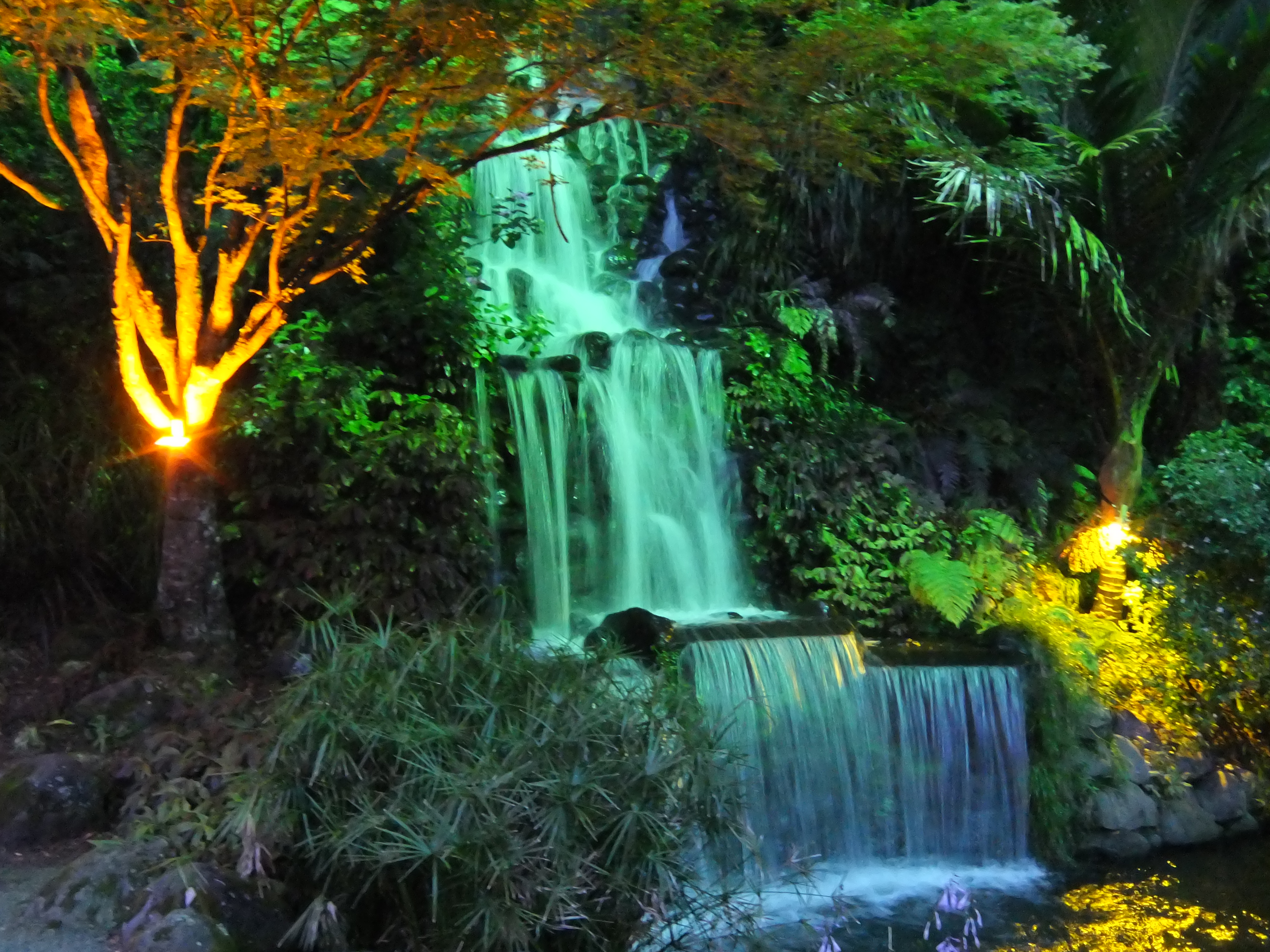
Pukekura Park, New Plymouth, New Zealand, illuminated during the annual Festival of Lights.

It was the 1970s when music and entertainment became a feature of the annual lights event. It was 1993 when the festival was officially named the 'Festival of Lights'. The festival is a summer attraction and cultural event for the city, and is attended by over 125,000 people each year.

== Sponsorship ==
The festival is sponsored by TSB Bank.
