= Joe O'Leary =

- Born: Michael Joseph O'Leary; 29 September 1883 Masterton, New Zealand
- Died: 12 December 1963 (aged 80) Masterton, New Zealand
- Notable relative: Humphrey O'Leary (brother)

Rugby union career
- Position(s): Fullback, second five-eighth
Provincial / State sides
| Years | Team | Apps | (Points) |
| 1900, 1904–08 | Wairarapa | | |
| 1905 | Wellington | | |
| 1909–13 | Auckland | | |
International career
| Years | Team | Apps | (Points) |
| 1910, 1913 | New Zealand | 4 | (16) |

Michael Joseph O'Leary (29 September 1883 – 12 December 1963) was a New Zealand rugby union player. Primarily a fullback, O'Leary represented Wairarapa, Wellington, and Auckland at a provincial level. He was a member of the New Zealand national side, the All Blacks, in 1910 and 1913. He played eight matches for the All Blacks, including four internationals, of which two were as captain against the touring Australian team in 1913.
