= Fred Young (New Zealand politician) =

The Honourable Fred Young
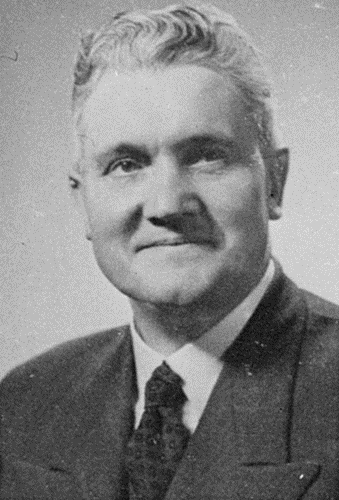

Member of the Legislative Council
- In office 8 September 1941 – 31 December 1950

Personal details
- Born: 9 June 1888 London, England
- Died: 14 February 1962 (aged 73) Wellington, New Zealand
- Party: Labour Party

Frederick George Young (9 June 1888 – 14 February 1962) was a New Zealand hotel employee and manager, trade unionist, soldier, and politician.

He was born in the East End of London, England in 1888, and came to New Zealand about 1905.

He was appointed a member of the New Zealand Legislative Council by the First Labour Government from 8 September 1941 to 7 September 1948, and then from 8 September 1948 to 31 December 1950 when it was abolished. A hotel worker and unionist, he had been associated with John A. Lee, and had opposed Michael Joseph Savage on some issues.

In 1944 he stood unsuccessfully for the Auckland City Council on a Labour Party ticket.
