= Sydney Shearer =

- Born: Sydney David Shearer; 23 October 1890 Wellington, New Zealand
- Died: 18 September 1973 (aged 82) Wellington, New Zealand
- Height: 1.71 m (5 ft 7 1/2 in)
- Weight: 84 kg (185 lb)
- Notable relative: Jack Shearer
- Occupation: Plumber

Rugby union career
- Position: Hooker
Amateur team(s)
Years	Team	Apps	(Points)
1913–14	Oriental		
1920–21	Selwyn		
1921–22, 24–30	Poneke		
Provincial / State sides
Years	Team	Apps	(Points)
1913–14, 1919–25	Wellington	49	
International career
Years	Team	Apps	(Points)
1921–22	New Zealand	0	(0)

Sydney David Shearer (23 October 1890 – 26 February 1973) was a New Zealand rugby union player who represented the All Blacks between 1921 and 1922. His position of choice was hooker.

== Early life and family ==
Shearer was born in Wellington on 23 October 1890, the son of Alexander Shearer and Mercy Lomas. He had four brothers, including Jack Shearer who was an All Black in 1920, and five sisters He married Irish-born Mary Kelly at Wellington in 1917, and they had four daughters.

== Rugby union ==
Shearer started his club career in 1913 at the Oriental club, playing with them for two seasons. After serving during World War I, he moved to the Selwyn club (where his brother Jack was playing) and played between 1919 and 1920. His last and more notable years came from representing the Poneke club between 1921 and 1930. Initially a wing-forward, Shearer eventually switched to the middle of the front row as a hooker.

Shearer made his debut for New Zealand against the 1921 New South Wales tourists. He toured New South Wales the next season playing all in five games. He played a further two more matches at home after the tour. Although he played eight matches for the All Blacks, he did not appear in a test match. He scored one try (3 points) in his All Black career.

== Military service ==
Shearer enlisted in March 1917, serving with the 29th Reinforcements, New Zealand Engineers in France as part of the New Zealand Expeditionary Force. He was discharged in August 1919.

== Death ==
Shearer died in Wellington on 26 February 1973, and was buried at Karori Cemetery.
