= Jack Shearer (rugby union) =

- Born: Jack Douglas Shearer; 19 August 1896 Wellington, New Zealand
- Died: 18 September 1963 (aged 67) Christchurch, New Zealand
- Notable relative: Sydney Shearer

Rugby union career
- Position: Loose forward
Amateur team(s)
Years	Team	Apps	(Points)
1919—20	Selwyn		
1921—25, 27—29, 32	Poneke		
Provincial / State sides
Years	Team	Apps	(Points)
1919—32	Wellington	62	
International career
Years	Team	Apps	(Points)
1920	New Zealand	5	(3)

Jack Douglas Shearer (19 August 1896 – 18 September 1963) was a New Zealand rugby union player who represented the All Blacks in 1920. His position of choice was Loose forward.

He was born on 19 August 1896 in Wellington, New Zealand. He died on 18 September 1963 in Christchurch, New Zealand.

== Career ==
Representing Wellington out of the Selwyn club, Shearer was selected for the All Blacks 1920 tour of New South Wales. He totalled 5 matches for the All Blacks with 3 of them being test matches. One of his five matches was played against Wellington back home after the tour.

Shearer joined the Poneke club in 1921 and became the club team captain between 1927 and 1932.

He played a total of 62 matches for Wellington.

== Family ==
His brother Sydney "Sid" Shearer was an All Black between 1921 and 1922. His parents' names were Alexander Shearer and Mary Loma, and, along with one brother, he also had five sisters.
