= Pukekura Park =

Botanic garden and park near New Plymouth, New Zealand

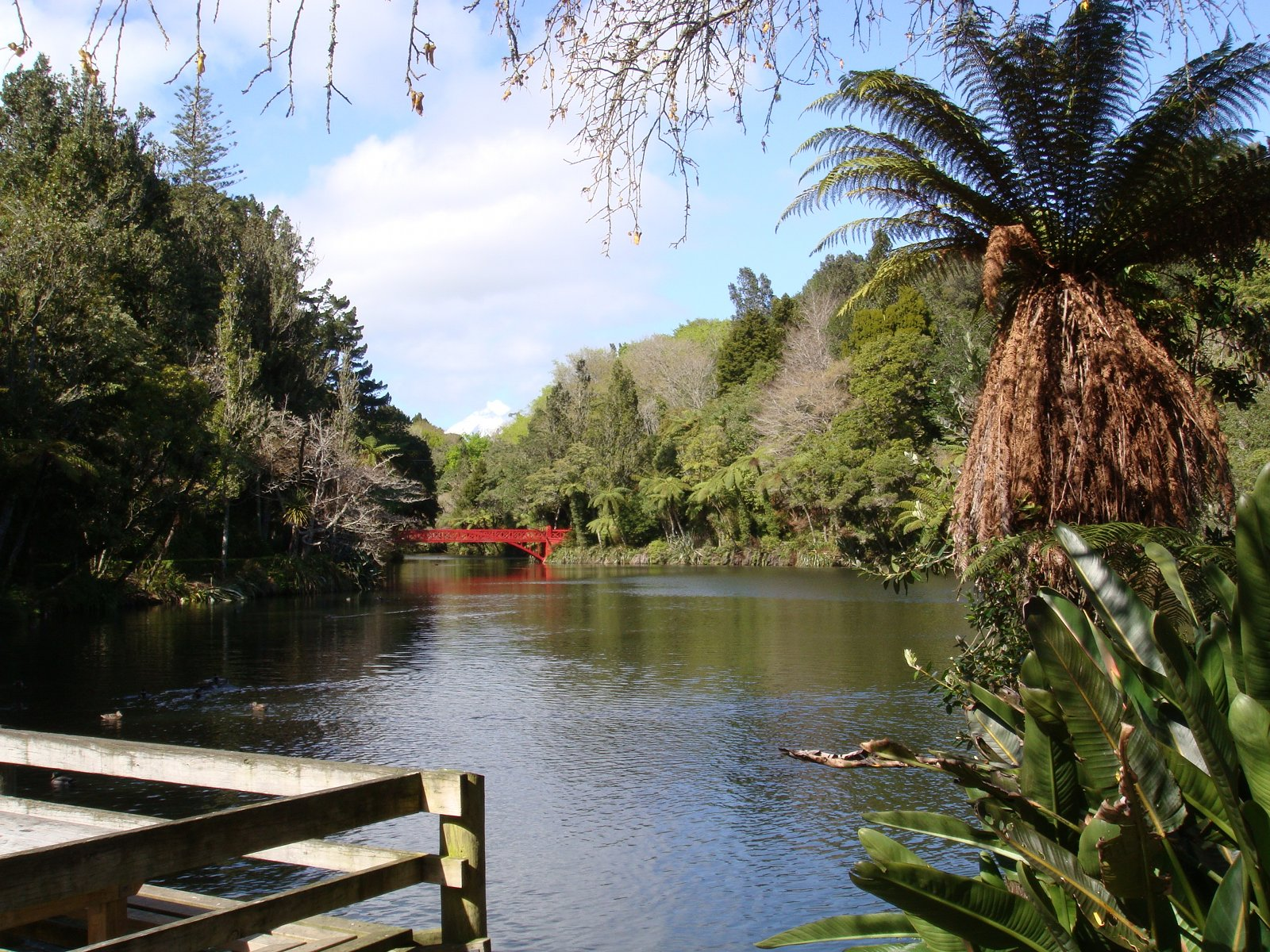
- The main lake at Pukekura, with Poet's Bridge and Mount Taranaki in the background
- Interactive map of Pukekura Park

Ground information
- Location: 10 Fillis Street, New Plymouth, Taranaki
- Country: New Zealand
- Coordinates: 39.0624104°S 174.0785908°E
- End names
- South Terrace End; North City End

International information
- Only men's ODI: 23 February 1992: Sri Lanka v Zimbabwe
- Only women's Test: 12–16 February 1992: New Zealand v England
- First women's ODI: 16 January 1982: New Zealand v Australia
- Last women's ODI: 18 January 1982: New Zealand v England
- First women's T20I: 4 March 2016: New Zealand v Australia
- Last women's T20I: 22 March 2018: New Zealand v West Indies
- As of 1 September 2020; Source: ESPNcricinfo

Pukekura Park is a Garden of National Significance, covering 52 hectares in the heart of New Plymouth, Taranaki, in New Zealand.

== History ==
The gala opening of New Plymouth's 15 hectare Recreation Ground was held on 29 May 1876. During the day the first trees were ceremonially planted by Miss Jane Carrington, the daughter of surveyor Frederic Alonzo Carrington: an oak for Great Britain, a pūriri for New Zealand, a Norfolk Island pine for the South Pacific Islands and a Pinus radiata for America. The ceremonial spade used to plant the trees is held in the Puke Ariki collection in New Plymouth. The Recreation Grounds were renamed "Pukekura Park" in 1907.

The park contains a diverse range of native and exotic plants. Various easy walking trails cross the park and meander along the lake sides, taking in the features of the park. Among these are the picturesque Poet's Bridge, which was opened on 11 March 1884. There is also a man-made cascading waterfall and a fountain in the Fountain Lake. Row boats can be hired on the main lake.

=== Historic buildings ===
Four Heritage New Zealand historic places are found in the park: Queen Victoria Monument, Band Rotunda, Kiosk and the Poet's Bridge.

==== Queen Victoria Monument ====
The Queen Victoria Monument is a Historic Place Category 2 Drinking Fountain erected to commemorate Queen Victoria's Diamond Jubilee in 1897. Located near the Band Rotunda at the base of Cannon Hill, this marble structure features three lion's head spouts and remains a functional drinking station for park visitors today. The monument reflects the Victorian era's influence on the park's early development.

==== Band Rotunda ====
The Band Rotunda in Pukekura Park reflects a decade of civic determination, progressing from Henry Edmonds’ 1882 proposal through continued fundraising, substantial earthworks on Cannon Hill, and phased construction. Completed in 1891 with cast iron elements manufactured by Scott Bros. in Christchurch, it was inaugurated during the Taranaki Jubilee before an audience of more than 5,000. Restored in 2013, it remains a central fixture for concerts, community events and seasonal festivals.

==== Kiosk (Teahouse) ====
The Kiosk, now widely known as The Teahouse, is an iconic historic café situated alongside the main lake in the park. The Teahouse began in 1905 as a small ladies’ meeting and tearoom designed by J. A. Maisey, and supported by community fundraising and donated labour. By the late 1910s, the building was considered inadequate, but full replacement was delayed due to limited funds. A new Tea House was finally constructed in 1931, funded largely by Mr and Mrs Burgess as part of their Golden Wedding celebrations. Earlier structures on the site were relocated to accommodate the new building.

==== Poet's Bridge ====
Built in 1884 after James T. Davis won £500 on a sweepstake horse named "The Poet", the bridge opened with lanterns, bunting, and celebration beside the old Bathing Shed. The original structure stood until 1936, when it was deemed unsafe. It was replaced in 1938 with a similar design funded by the Sanders bequest. The new bridge’s now iconic red colour came from a suggestion inspired by Japan’s Shinkyo Bridge.

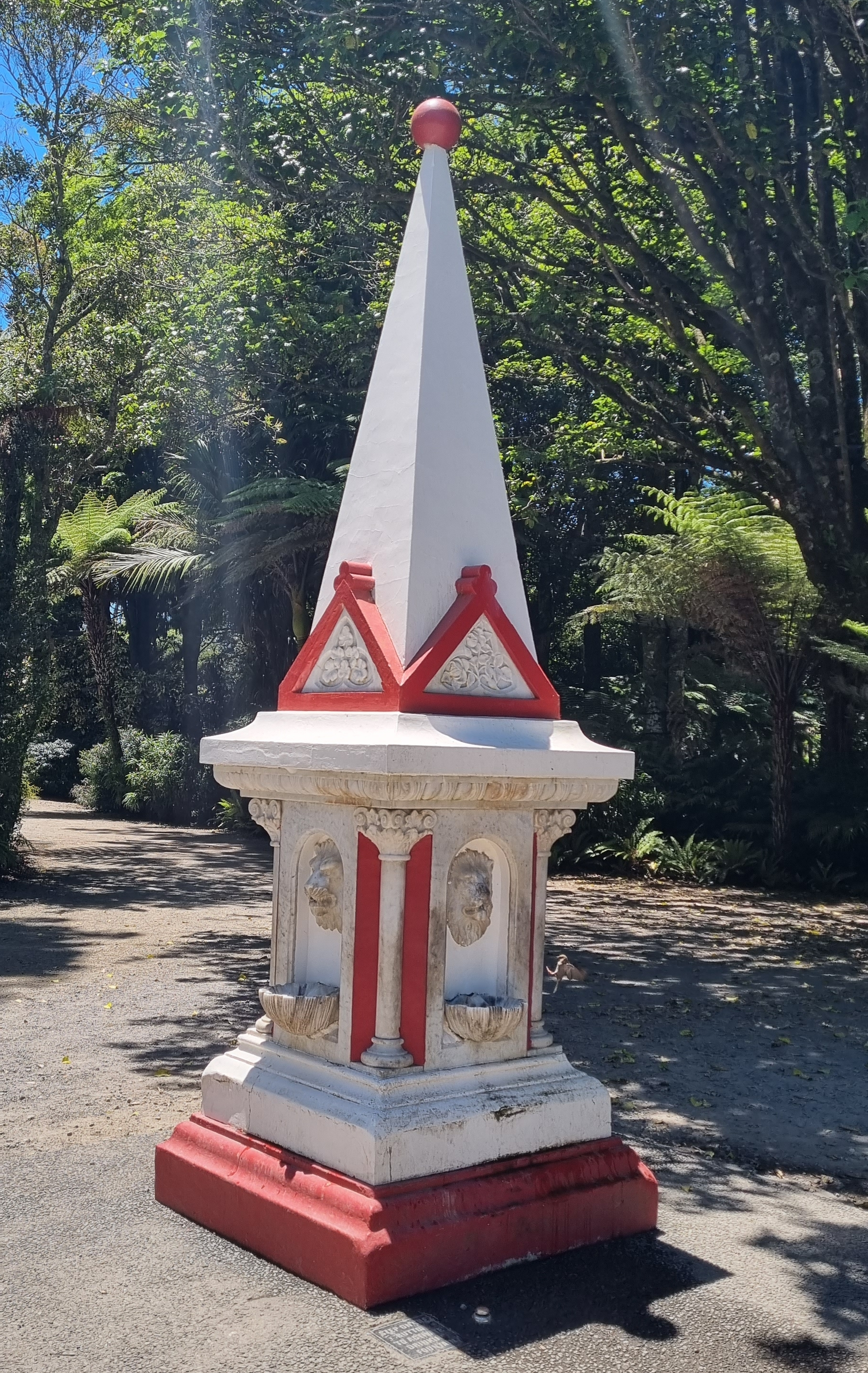
Queen Victoria Monument

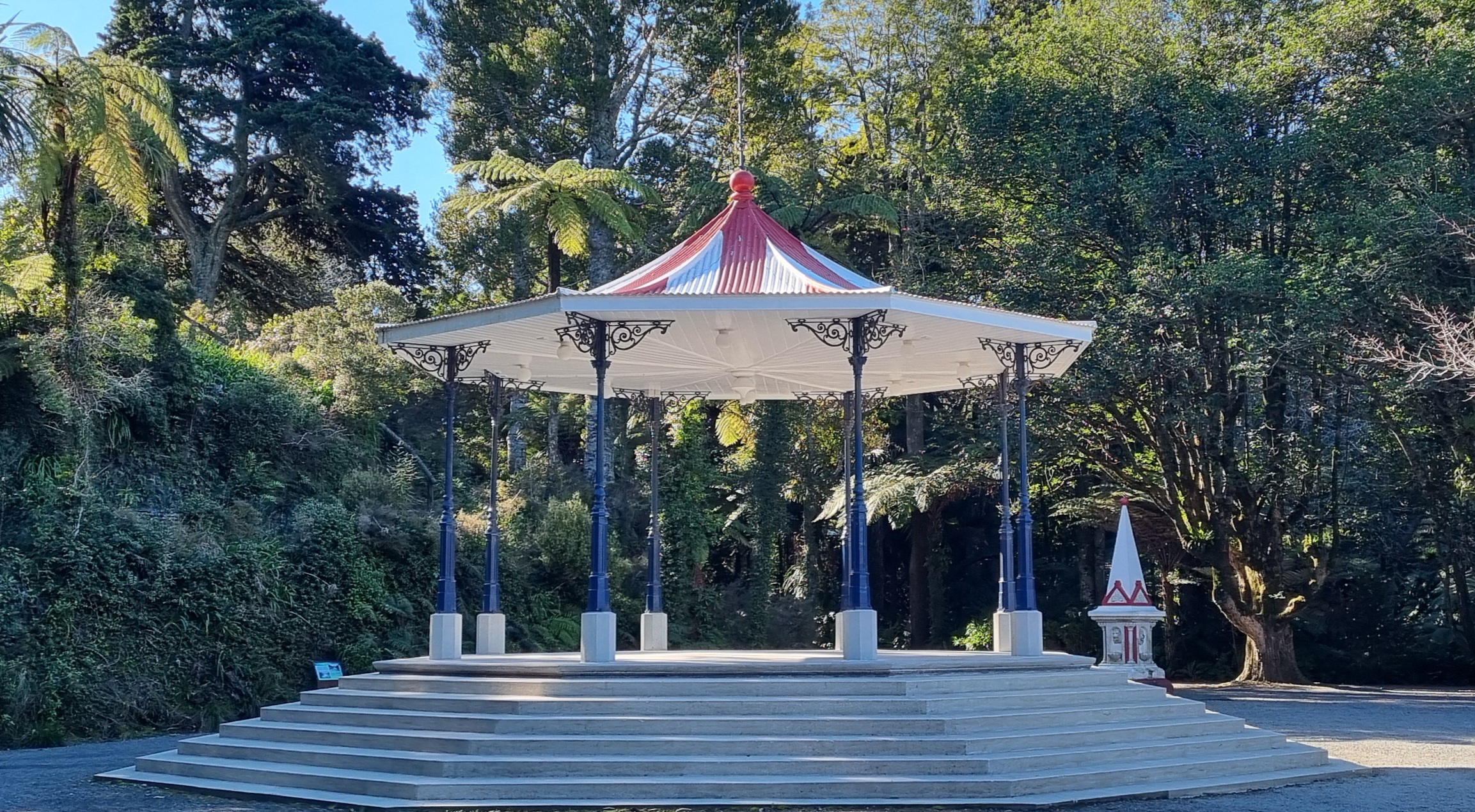
Band Rotunda

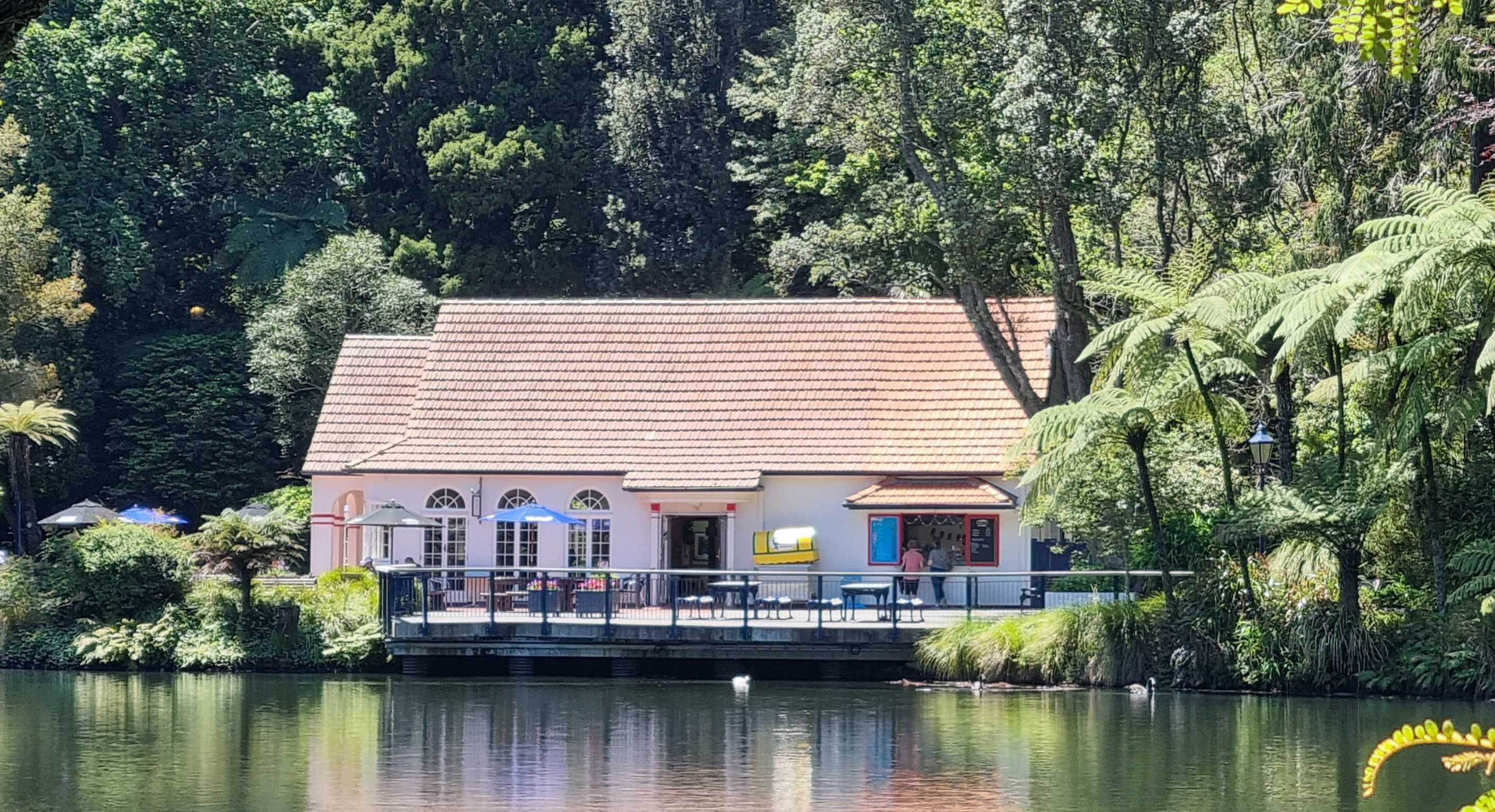
Kiosk (Teahouse)

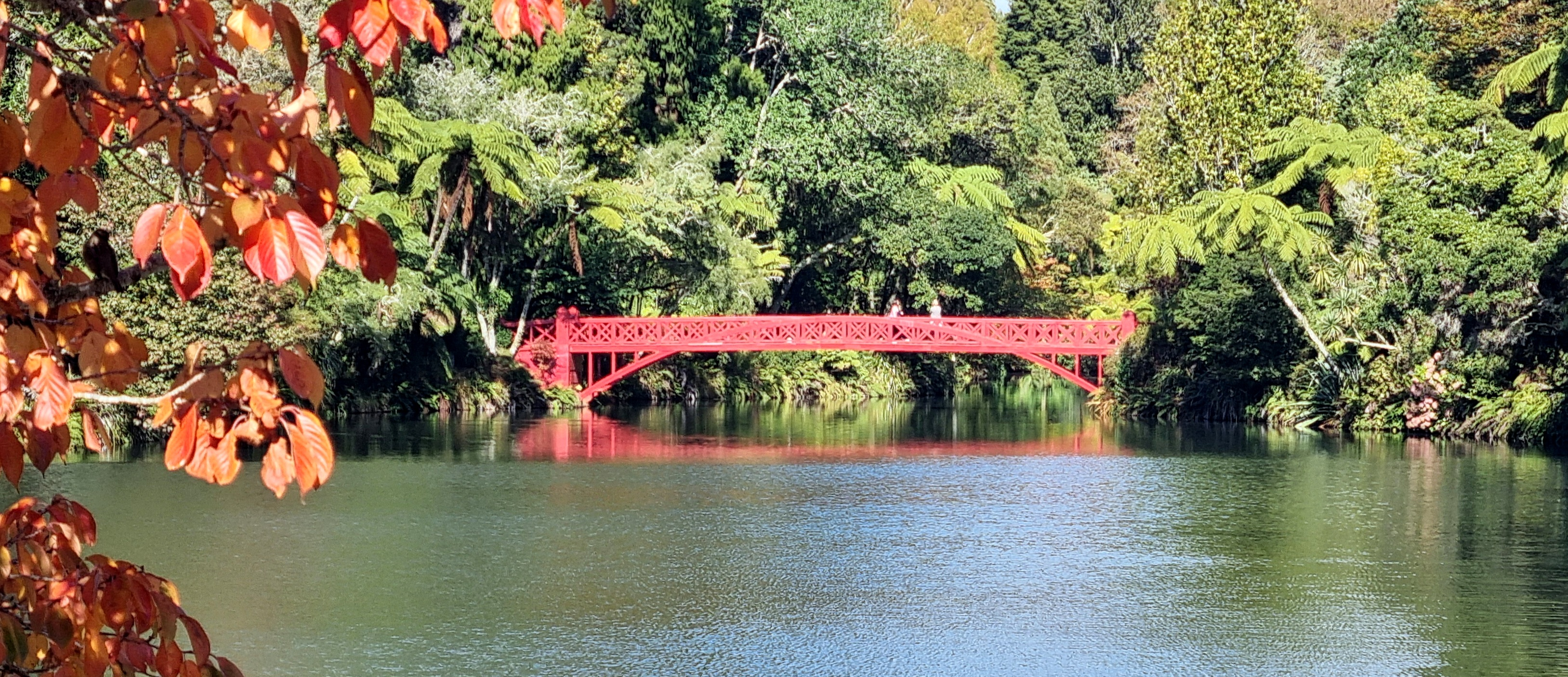
Poet's Bridge

== Festival of Lights ==
The "TSB Festival of Lights" is an annual, free summer event held in Pukekura Park. With light installations illuminating the park, the festival typically runs for five to six weeks from mid-December through late January. The multi-award-winning festival has a daytime and nighttime programme of events for people of all ages.

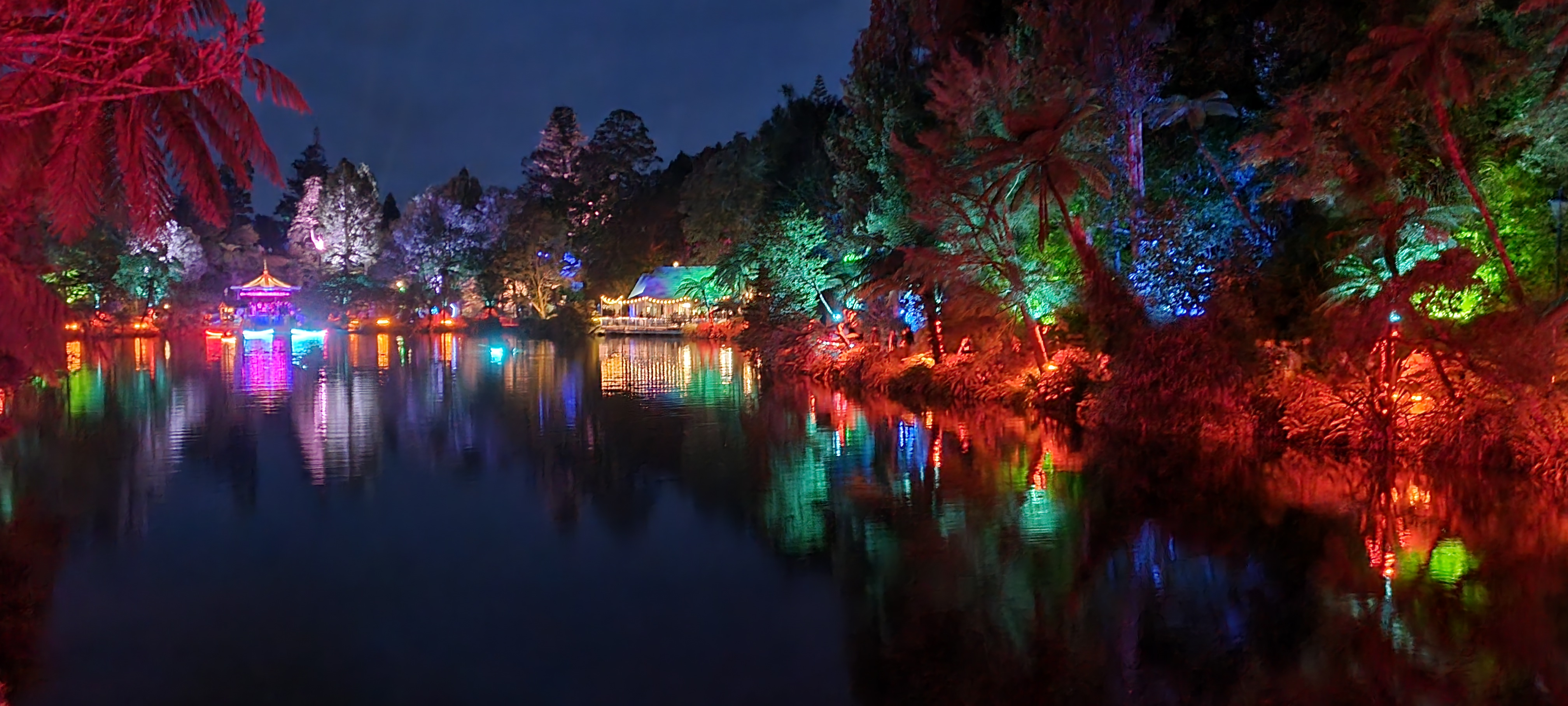

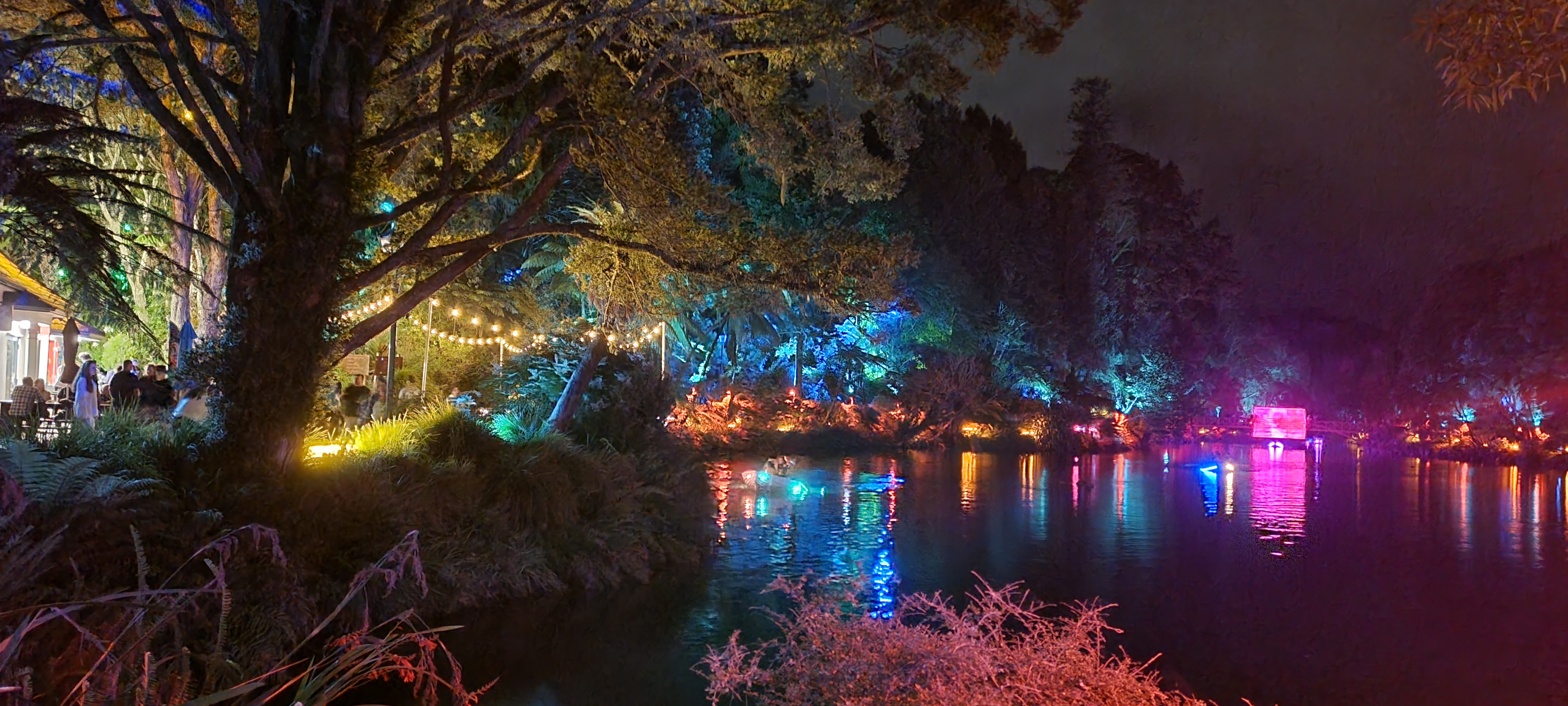

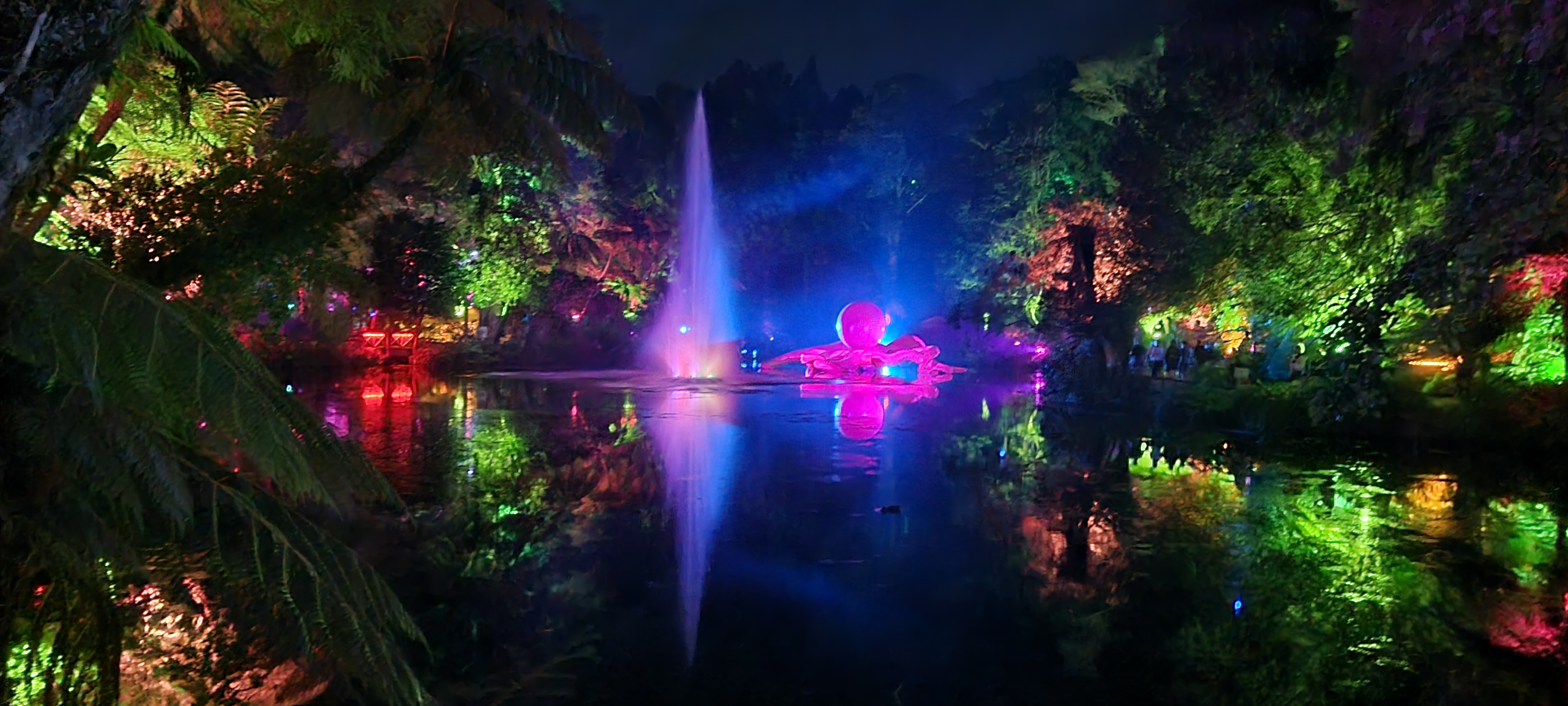

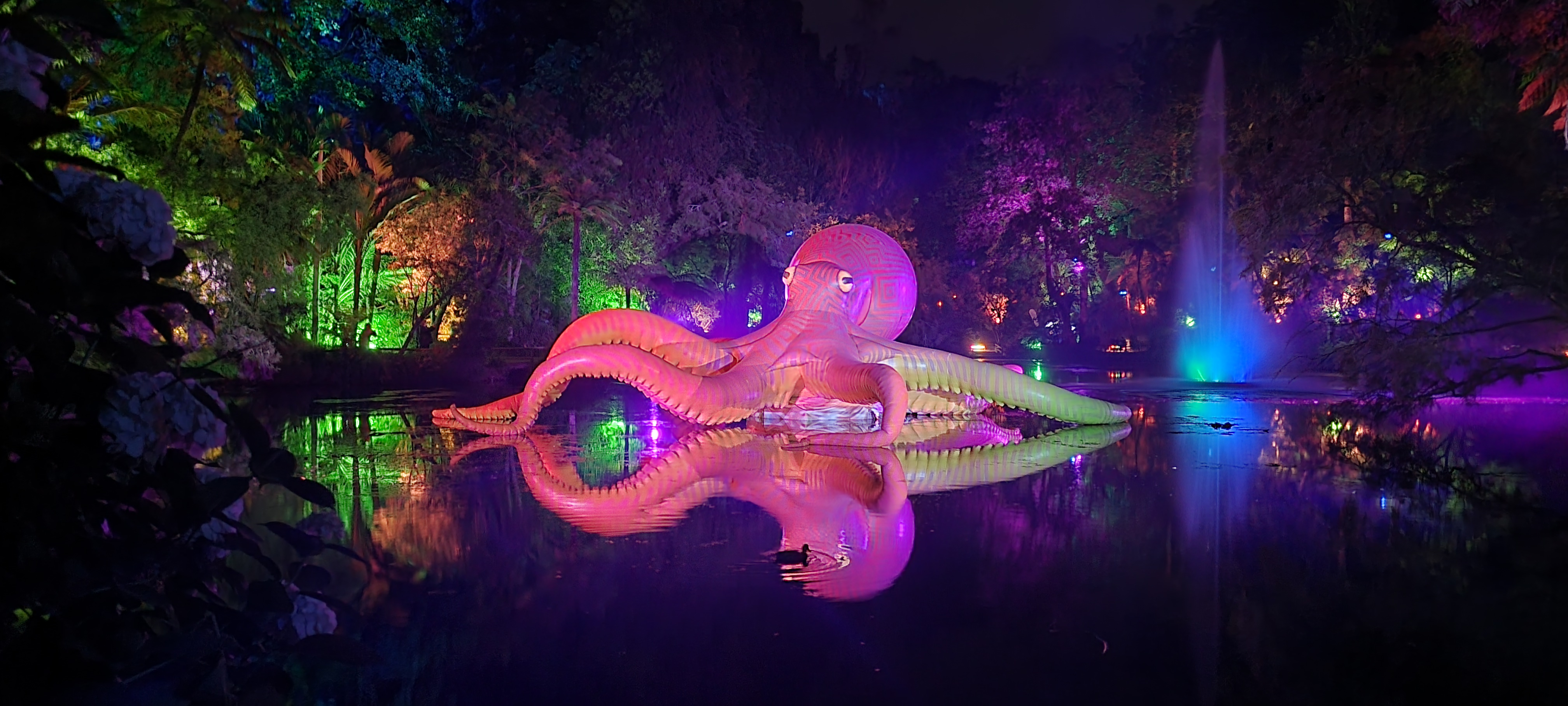

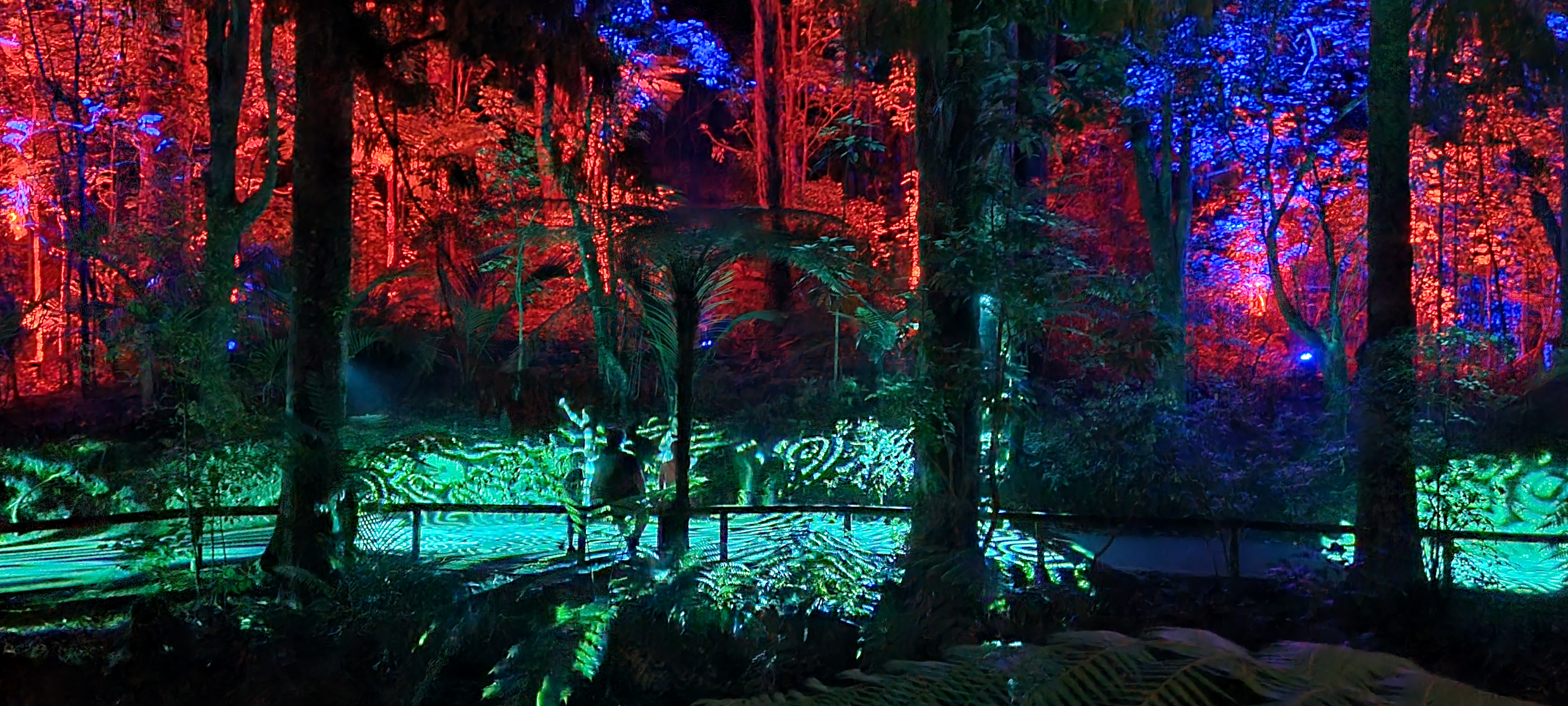

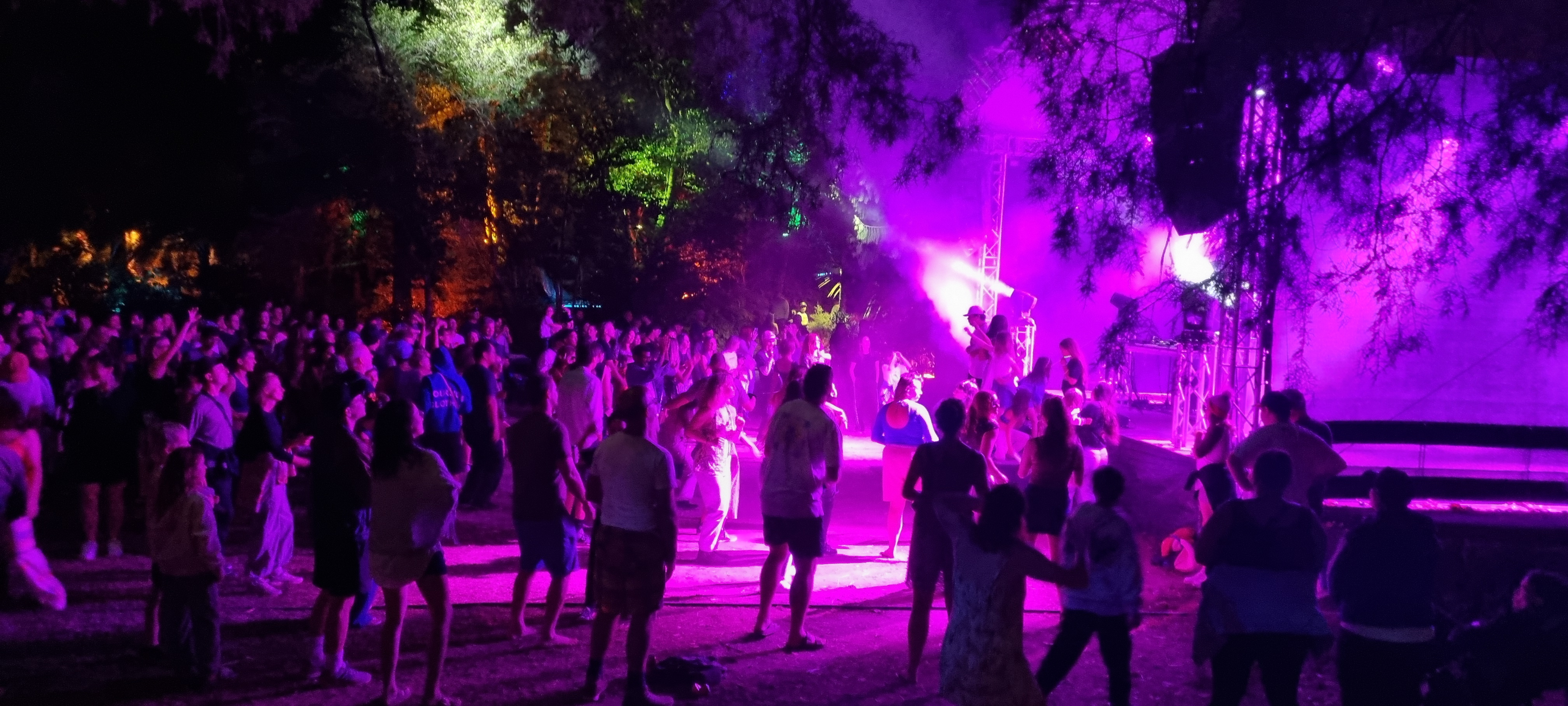

== Fernery ==
Pukekura Park’s Fernery and Display Houses comprise three glass‑roofed caverns cut directly into the hillside. Positioned below the natural ground level, they maintain a moderated, temperate environment that supports the cultivation and exhibition of a diverse range of plant species from around the world.

The Fernery originated from a 1918 proposal to safeguard native ferns, but only realised in 1926 after extensive fundraising efforts. Over the next eighteen months, the hillside was excavated by hand, with the removed soil used to form the lawn in front of the complex. Planting began in July 1927, introducing 2,340 ferns across 145 species, and the Fernery opened to the public on 28 January 1928, funded entirely through community subscription and donations. Initially focused on New Zealand ferns, the collection expanded in 1934 with the addition of plants from the Brooklands estate glasshouses. Ongoing improvements to both the structures and displays were supported by further bequests, including a major 1969 gift that enabled the rebuilding of a fourth house dedicated to exotic species such as begonias and orchids.

== Japanese Hillside ==
Japanese Hillside in Pukekura Park was created after 1992, replacing old pines with Japanese species to form a naturalistic Japanese forest. Key plantings in 1993 included Acer japonicum, Chamaecyparis obtusa, Cryptomeria japonica and azaleas. The lower slope was developed in 2001, when a red Torii gate — designed with guidance from sister city Mishima — was installed and the area replanted. The Torii, named "Mishima Gate", was officially unveiled in May 2001 during a sister city convention, attended by New Plymouth District Council representatives and a delegation from Mishima City.

== Kunming Garden ==
Kunming Garden in Brooklands was gifted to New Plymouth in 2003 by the mayor of Kunming, Yunnan, after the sister‑city agreement. Built by specialist craftsmen from Dali, using 34 tonnes of stone, timber and carvings imported from China – including limestone from the Kunming Stone Forest – the garden features a traditional pavilion, moon gate and pathways. All plants are Asian species sourced locally. Opened on 27 February 2005, its centrepiece, the Spring Wind Pavilion, was assembled without power tools or fasteners and includes a hand‑painted ceiling created freehand on site by two artists.

Kunming Garden

Kunming Garden – Spring Wind Pavilion

Kunming Garden – Spring Wind Pavilion

Spring Wind Pavilion – Hand Painted Ceiling

Kunming Garden – Moongate

Kunming Garden – Friendship Stone

Kunming Garden informational sign

== Sports and music ==
Pukekura Park is a popular events venue.

=== Cricket ===
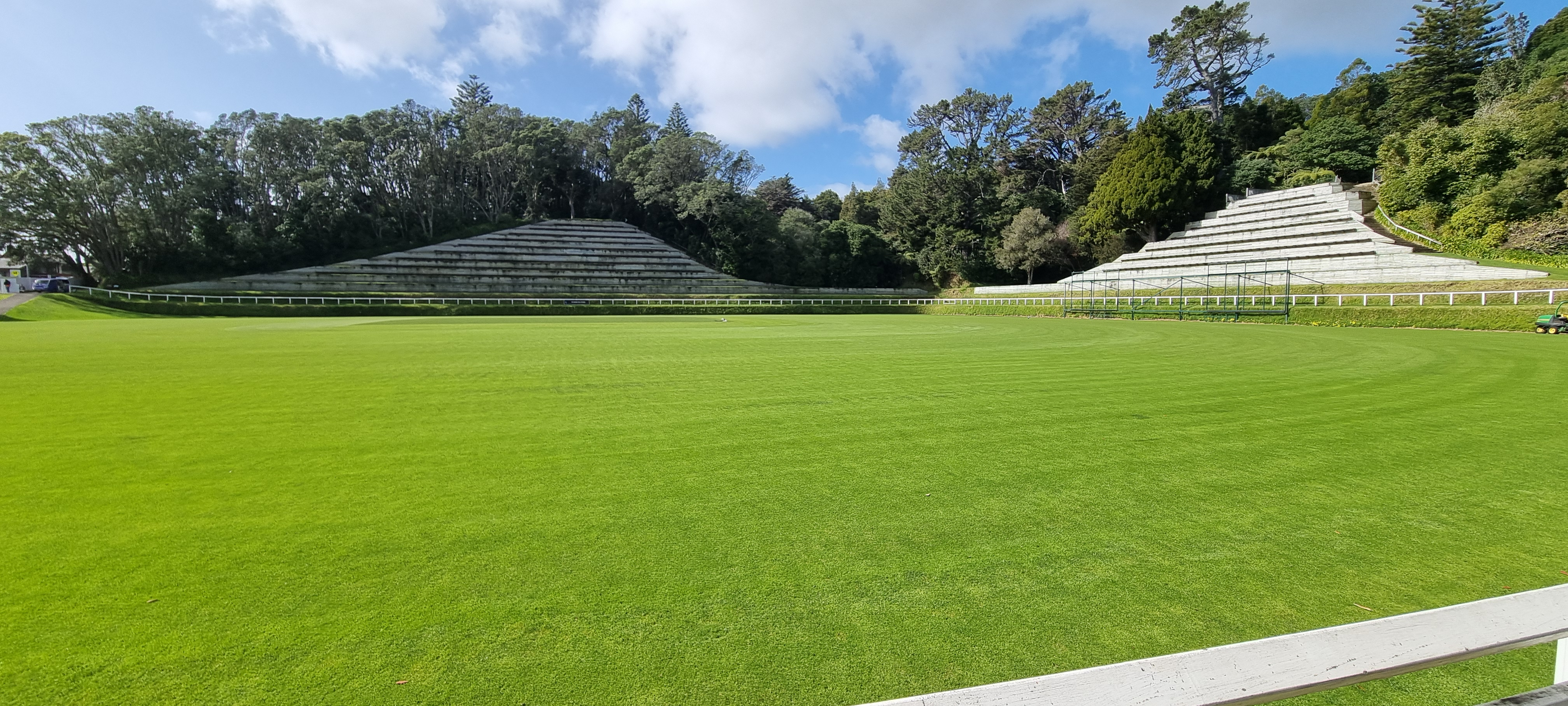
Pukekura Park Sports Ground

At the north-western end of the park is a cricket ground, established in the 1880s which is noted for the beauty of its setting. The first game of cricket there was played in 1892.

After the team's visit to play a two-day game against Taranaki in January 1936, the Marylebone Cricket Club captain Errol Holmes wrote:

... when we went to the ground, we were struck with its beauty, and decided that it must be one of the most attractive that could be imagined. On three sides it was surrounded by high banks, giving it the facilities of a natural amphitheatre. The pavilion stood on the fourth side which, in turn, led out on to Pukekura Park, famous for its assortment of trees and banks of hydrangeas almost as big as houses, while, away to the south, rose the peak of Mount Egmont, snow-capped, serene and splendidly aloof.

The ground has hosted first-class cricket since the 1950–51 season, when the Central Districts cricket team was established and began playing some of its matches there. As of 2021, 55 men's first-class have been played on the ground, with the last match played in 2015. Central Districts men's and women's sides continue to use the ground in List A and Twenty20 cricket competitions.

The ground first hosted international cricket in 1982 when three Women's One Day International matches were played on the ground. A women's Test match was played on the ground in February 1992 and later in the same month a single men's international match, a One Day International in the 1992 Cricket World Cup, was played on the ground with Sri Lanka beating Zimbabwe in a high-scoring match by three wickets with four balls to spare. Zimbabwean Andy Flower scored a century during the match, making 115 not out. Three women's Twenty20 International matches were played on the ground between 2016 and 2018.

Today the park can only host domestic fixtures because of the small boundaries and deteriorating facilities. New Zealand Cricket announced that the park would not host any Super Smash matches in the 2024–2025 season though it would continue to host other domestic cricket. Concerns around the state of its facilities, including players' changing rooms, training facilities, and match officials' and media facilities have been growing in recent years.

=== Other sports and events ===
In August 2021, domestic rugby returned to the venue for the first time in 79 years when host Taranaki defeated Hawke's Bay 33–19 in the National Provincial Championship in a one-off match. Other Taranaki home matches were played at TET Stadium in Inglewood during this period.

On the eastern side of the park is New Plymouth Raceway, a horse racing course. Between the racetrack and the park is TSB Stadium, a 4,500 seat multi-purpose indoor stadium which is home to the Taranaki Airs basketball team who competed in the New Zealand NBL.

Near the southern end of the park is the Bowl of Brooklands amphitheatre, which commonly hosts music events. The annual WOMAD festival is held at Pukekura Park.

== Other features ==
Pukekura Park is also home to the popular Tea House on the Lake, which has been situated beside the main lake since 1931.

In 2007, Pukekura Park was the winner of the "Mayfair" spot in a nationwide competition for places on Hasbro's New Zealand edition of Monopoly.
