= Statue of George Grey =

Statue of George Grey could refers to:

- Statue of George Grey, Auckland
- Statue of George Grey, Cape Town
