= Statue of Cecil Rhodes =

Statue of Cecil Rhodes may refer to:

- Statue of Cecil Rhodes, Bulawayo, Zimbabwe
- Statue of Cecil Rhodes, Company's Garden, Cape Town, South Africa
- Statue of Cecil Rhodes, University of Cape Town, South Africa (removed in 2015; see Rhodes Must Fall)
- Statue of Cecil Rhodes, Oriel College, Oxford, England

== See also ==
- Rhodes Memorial
- Physical Energy (sculpture)
