= Company's Garden =

Park and heritage site in Cape Town, South Africa

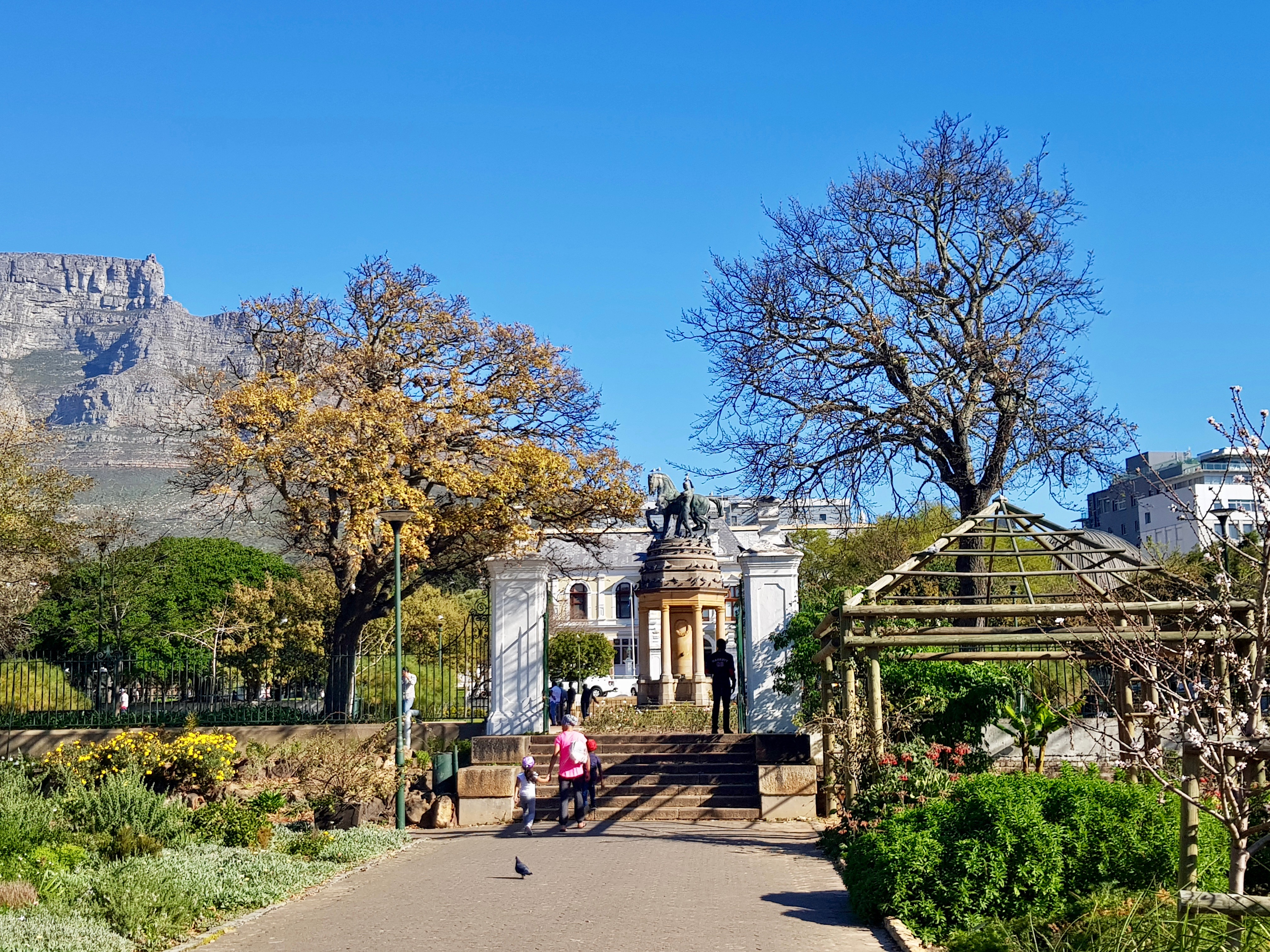
- Interactive map of Company's Garden
- Type: Botanical
- Location: Cape Town, South Africa
- Coordinates: 33°55′40″S 18°25′01″E
- Area: 3.2 ha (7.9 acres)
- Created: 29 April 1652; 374 years ago
- Operator: City of Cape Town

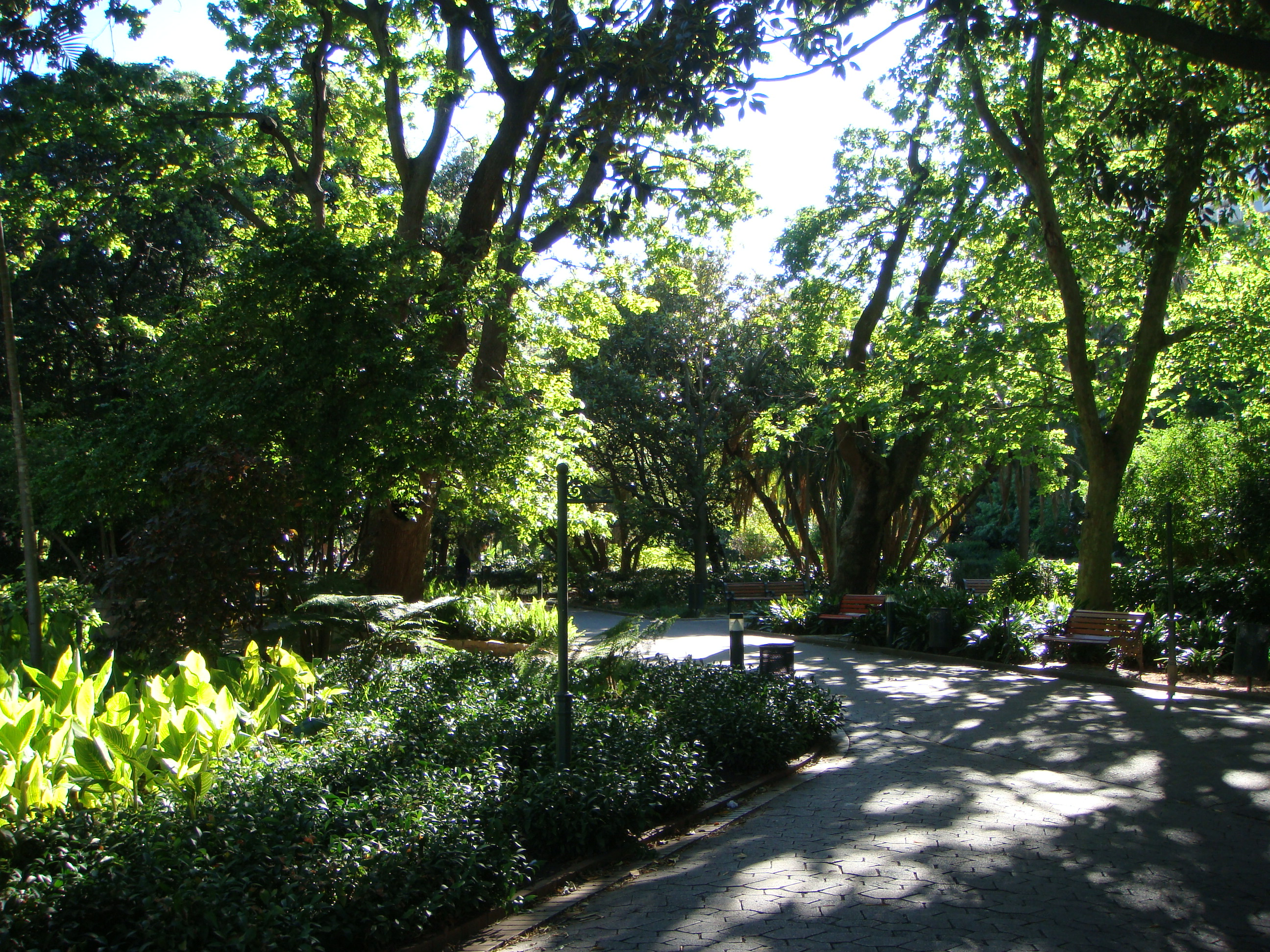
Walking in the Company's Garden

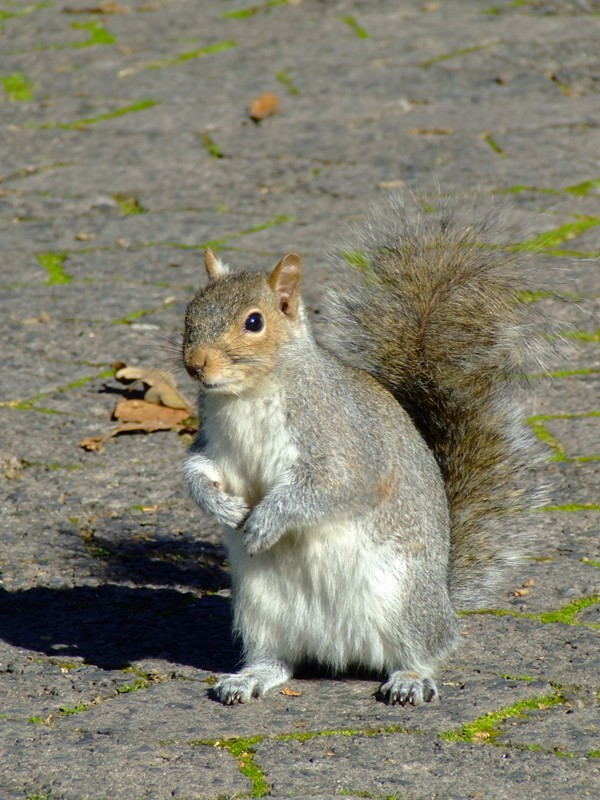
Squirrel in the Company's Garden

The Company's Garden is a large public park situated in Cape Town CBD - the main commercial district of Cape Town. It is the oldest garden in South Africa, and a national heritage site.

The garden was originally created in the 1650s by the region's first European settlers and provided fertile ground to grow fresh produce to replenish ships rounding the Cape. It is watered from the Molteno Dam, which uses water from the springs on the lower slopes of Table Mountain.

== History ==
The Dutch East India Company established the garden in Cape Town for the purpose of providing fresh vegetables to the settlement as well as passing ships. Master gardener and free burgher Hendrik Boom prepared the first ground for sowing of seed on 29 April 1652.

The settlers sowed different kinds of seeds and kept record thereof each day. Through trial and error they managed to compile a calendar which they used for the sowing and harvesting throughout the year. At first they grew salad herbs, peas, large beans, radish, beet, spinach, wheat, cabbage, asparagus and turnips among others.

They caught fish, trapped wild animals and traded with the Khoisan for cattle and sheep with copper and tobacco. By 1653 the garden allowed the settlers to become self sustainable throughout the year. As the settlement grew, additional farming land was prepared at Rondebosch in 1656.

By 1658 nearly every garden plant of Europe and India was already cultivated in the garden, though potatoes and maize were not yet introduced.

Before 1680 the Company's Garden was mainly used to produce vegetables, until Simon van der Stel laid out the ground afresh for the purpose of beautifying the garden.

During the 17th century the garden was made famous by writers of various nationalities, claiming that visitors who had seen the most celebrated gardens of Europe and India were agreed that nowhere else in the world was so great a variety of trees and shrubs of vegetables and flowers to be met with together.

The garden superintendent and Botanist Hendrik Bernard Oldenland compiled a herbarium which was sent to the Netherlands after his sudden death. In 1770 the 'Catalogue of Plants' was found in possession of Professor Burmann of Amsterdam.

== Features in the park ==
- The oldest cultivated pear tree in South Africa (circa 1652)
- A rose garden designed and built in 1929
- A well stocked fish pond
- Dellville Wood Memorial Garden, which commemorates the World War I Battle of Delville Wood in France, in which a predominantly South African force of more than 3,000 soldiers was reduced to 755 survivors by German forces
- An aviary
- Restaurant – The Company's Garden Restaurant
- Botanically and historically valuable trees
- Local arts and crafts along the avenue
- Lawns and benches
- A herb and succulent garden
- Historic statues
- Iziko South African Museum and Iziko National Gallery
- Various wild, feral and semi-domesticated species of birds and animals, including the African turtle dove, laughing dove, rock dove, Egyptian goose and squirrels.

== Monuments ==
Image	Subject	Location	Designer/Sculptor	Date of unveiling	Notes	Listing
	Cecil John Rhodes 1855–1902 Your hinterland is there	33°55′35.8″S 18°25′02.8″E	Herbert Baker	28 June 1910 –University of Cape Town Newspaper Archives Cape Argus	Main article: Statue of Cecil Rhodes, Company's Garden	
	Japanese Lantern Monument	33°55′33″S 018°25′6″E		1932	Main article: Japanese Lantern Monument	
	Artillery Memorial	33°55′41.8″S 18°24′58.4″E			Main article: Artillery Memorial, Cape Town	
	Delville Wood Memorial This memorial commemorates the South Africans who died in the Great Wars 1914–1918, 1939–1944.	33°55′41″S 18°24′57.3″E	Herbert Baker	3 November 1930	Main article: Delville Wood Memorial	
	Major General Sir Henry Timson Lukin EKCB CMG DSO Commander Legion Nile Born 24 May 1860 Died 16 December 1925 He served his King and beloved by his fellow men	33°55′40.2″S 18°24′56.2″E	Anton van Wouw	March 3, 1932 (University of Cape Town Newspaper Archives Cape Argus).		
	Sir George Grey K.C.B Governor 1854–1861	33°55′32.3″S 18°25′06.6″E	William Calder Marshall	1863	Main article: Statue of George Grey, Cape Town	
	AIDS Memorial	33°55′40.1″S 18°24′59.5″E		2002		
	Temperance Memorial Jesus said whosoever drinketh of this water shall thirst again But whosoever drinketh of the water that I shall give him shall never thirst But the water that I shall give him shall be in him as a well of that I shall give him shall never thirst water springing up into everlasting life	33°55′35″S 18°25′01″E		1861	Main articles: Temperance fountain and Temperance movement	
	Field Marshal General Jan Christian Smuts 1870 – 1950	33°55′42.4″S 18°24′59.2″E	Sydney Harpley	29 May 1964		
	Lioness Gateway	33°55′49″S 18°24′52″E	Anton Anreith	1805		
	Cape Town Labour Corps Memorial		Dean Jay Architects	22 January 2025		

== Nearby places of interest ==
- Parliament and Tuynhuys are adjacent to the park
- National Library of South Africa
- St George's Cathedral
- Slave Lodge
- Centre for the Book
- Gardens Shul, South African Jewish Museum
- Cape Town Holocaust Centre
- Hiddingh Campus, University of Cape Town
- Mount Nelson Hotel

== Events ==
- The Company's Garden hosts the annual Cape Town Festival.
- Cape Peninsula University of Technology usually has the annual walking/city tour that concludes at the garden.

== See also ==
- Iziko South African Museum
- South African National Gallery
- National Library of South Africa
