= Artillery Memorial, Cape Town =

Memorial to the gunners who fought for South Africa during World War I

Artillery Memorial
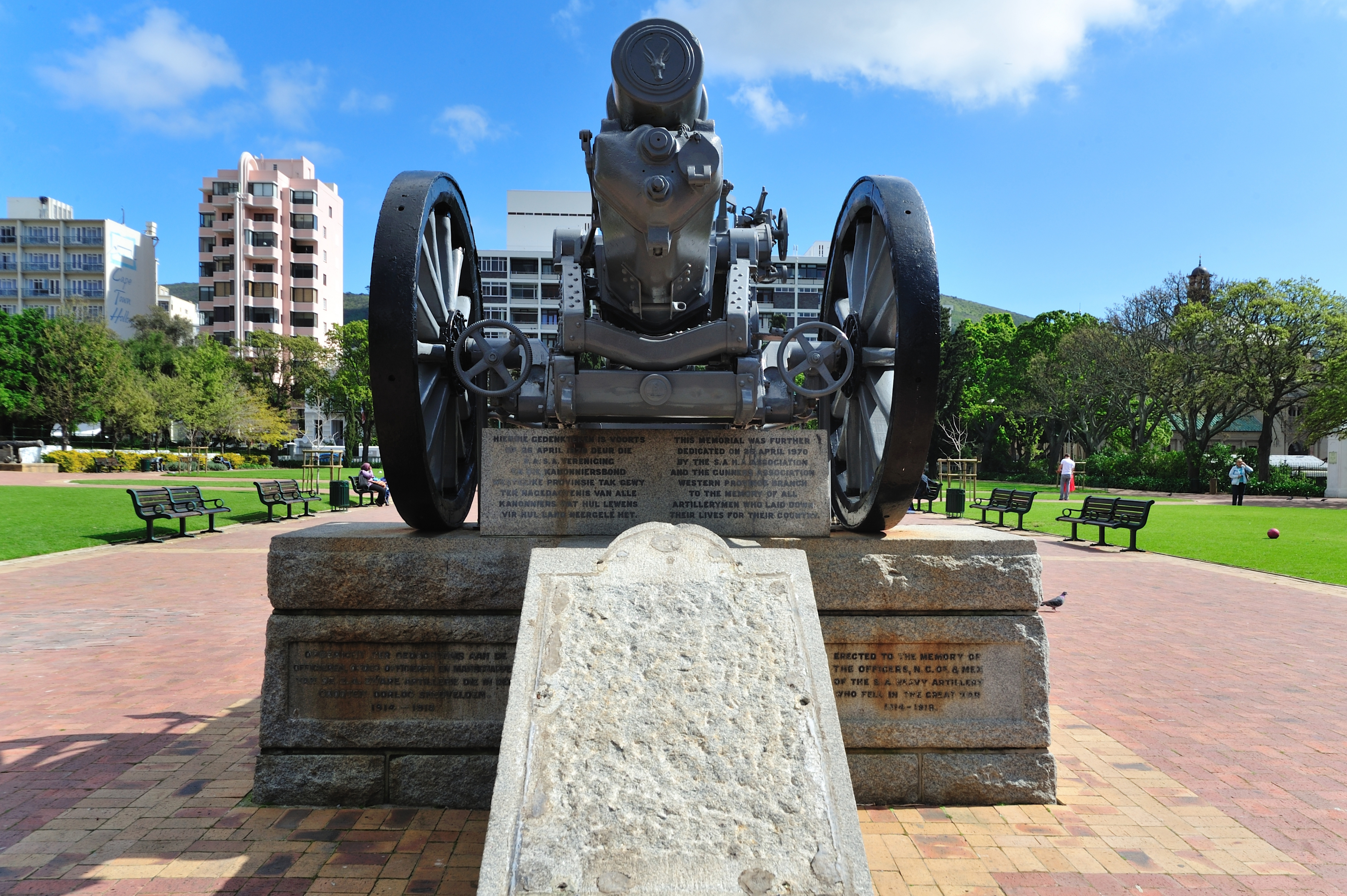
- Artillery Memorial, Cape Town
- Interactive map of Artillery Memorial
- Location: Company's Garden, Cape Town, South Africa
- Coordinates: 33°55′41.9″S 18°24′58.5″E

Artillery Memorial, Cape Town was erected in memory of the gunners who fought for South Africa during World War I. The memorial, which forms part of the Delville Wood Memorial, is located in the Company's Garden, Cape Town, and was strategically established to commemorate South Africa's artillery soldiers who fell in battle. Of those who volunteered to fight during the war, 5800 were white South African, amongst whom 15% were Dutch and 85% English. An estimated 2536 of these men were killed in the Deville Wood battle in Europe. The Artillery Memorial, an authentic cannon facing east towards the National Gallery, proudly honors South Africa's heavy artillerymen. Inscribed on it are the names of the officers, N.C.O.'s and men of the South African artillery who fell in the Great War (1914–1918).

The memorial is classified as a public monument and as such is subject to protection in terms of heritage legislation administered by Heritage Western Cape the provincial heritage resources authority of the Western Cape Province.

== Background ==
Artillery originally refers to any weapon used by infantry releasing greater amounts of ammunition through a projectile head. The broad term originally included all weapons with projectiles except for personal weapons. The South Africa Artillery Memorial is largely dedicated to those field artillery soldiers who were first introduced to the use of the then modern weapons for battle. The first consignment of these weapons were imported from Britain, though the number was not sufficient to supply all the front-line combat soldiers. According to Major D.D. Hall, artillery was only introduced in South Africa after 1880, before the Anglo Boer War. "No artillery was used at the Bronkhorstspruit battle on 20 December 1880 but the artillery of both adversaries did play a role in most of the actions..." (Major Hall, D.D., 1980). Artillery referred to those metal weapons or guns which had been imported from Britain before the Zulu wars. The engines comprise specialized devices which use stored energy to operate mechanically, chemically or electromagnetically.

=== History ===
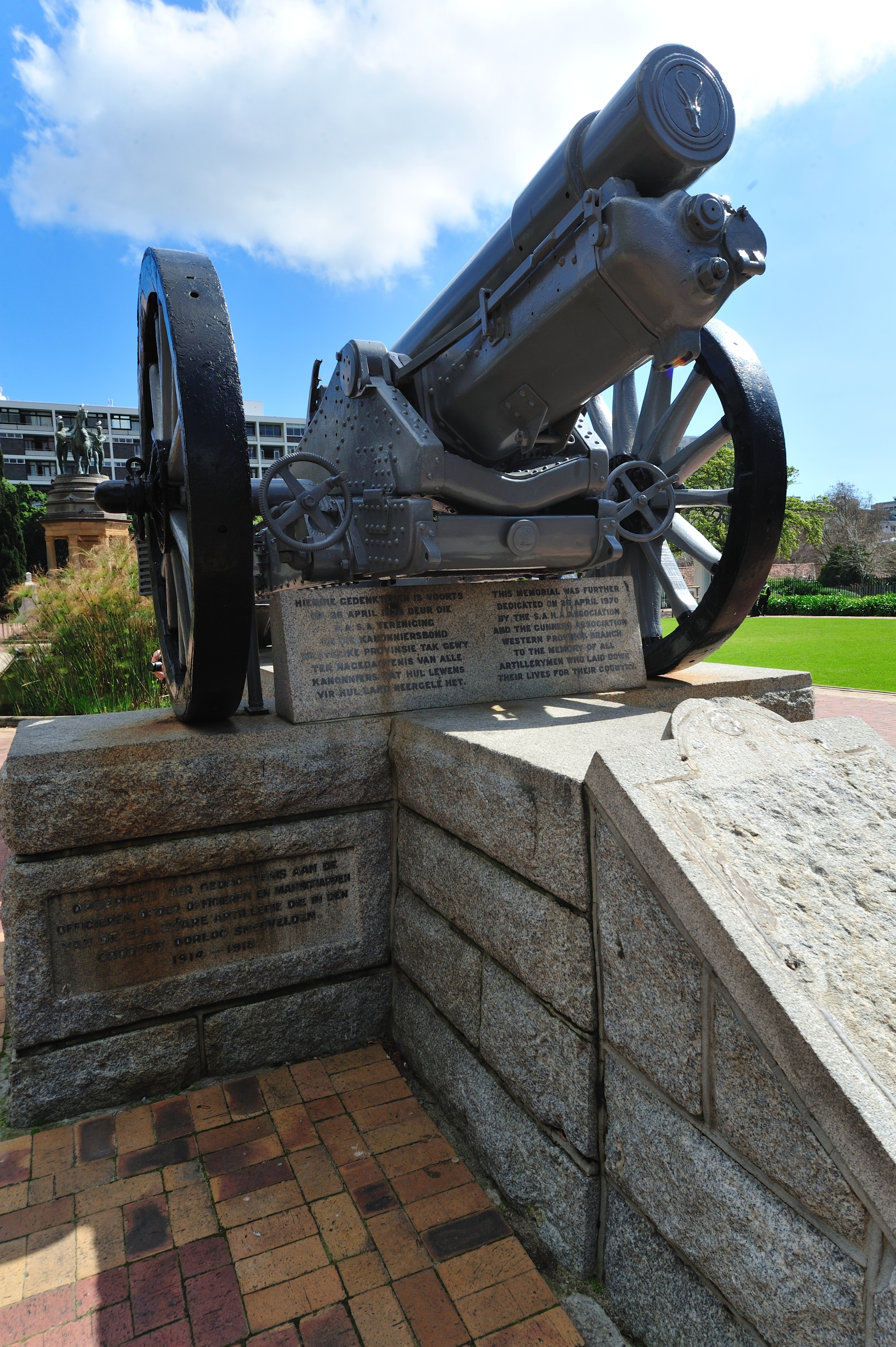
Artillery Memorial, Cape Town

Prior to the South African wars, metallic artillery was first introduced in the American Civil War. Metallic rifle and pistol cartridges, the first repeating rifles and carbines, the first ironclad ships, and many other inventions constituted a change in warfare. This marked an end to the use of primitive weapons and the introduction of modern warfare. According to DD Hall, South Africa was only introduced to the use of artillery due to the British, who possessed a small number of war artillery such as the N Battery 5th Brigade, Royal Artillery, 10th Battery 7th Brigade, and the 9 pr 8cwt RML. By 1880, the magnitude of artillery in British possession was unknown. Despite the British artillery data available, artillery reinforcements were ordered from England, however arrived too late for the Anglo-Zulu war. This affected the British severely as they became desperate for weapons to combat against anti-colonial communities in South Africa. The few available guns had to be divided between the main battle front in Natal and the garrisons of the besieged towns in the Transvaal. "The Boers had some guns, but none of these were modern. The few modern guns which they had possessed, had been taken over by the British on the annexation of the Transvaal in 1877. So they had to rely on a few old ships guns, and some guns – the Ras guns – which were made for the occasion."

According to Col (Ref) Lionel Crook, a majority of the gunners that were recruited in the Cape Colony by 1885 were volunteers who had opted to defend their country. During the Anglo-Boer war, a volunteer artillery corps was established in Transvaal, a colony at the time. Other volunteer units were established in the former republics of the Transvaal and the Free State but they both disappeared during the South African War of 1899–1902. It is believed that these gunners fought bravely for their country.

Following the passing into law of the South Africa Defence Act, 1912 (Act No. 13), the gunners began the use of Mounted Rifles. These Mounted Rifles-also known as South African Mounted Rifles (SAMR), were to include a battery of artillery. Only three of these batteries were created due to a lack in supply of guns. With the outbreak of the First World War in August 1914, Britain was forced to keep all the guns produced for themselves. This led to a shift from foreign policy to national policy. Following was the incorporation of three SAMR units that were newly established into the Active Citizen Force (ACF). South African Field Artillery and the South African Heavy Artillery were raised from volunteers to fight in France and East Africa respectively during the Battle of Delville Wood against the Germans. Thus the Artillery Monument was constructed to commemorate the lives of these brave soldiers and volunteers who lost their lives, especially those taken during the battle in France. The monument is one of six war memorials in the Company's Garden in Cape Town.

=== Labour Corps Memorial ===
In January 2025, a new memorial was unveiled in the Company's Gardens and inaugurated by the Commonwealth War Graves Commission President as well as Britain's Princess Anne. This memorial is dedicated to the men who served in the Labour Corps.
