= George Grey =

British soldier, explorer, colonial administrator and writer (1812–1898)

The Right Honourable Sir George Grey KCB
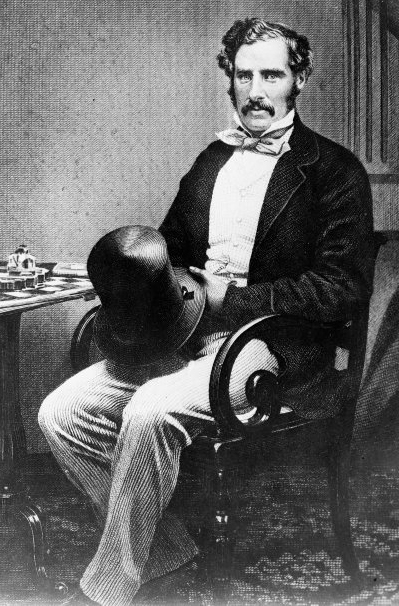
- Sir George Grey in 1861

11th Premier of New Zealand
- In office 13 October 1877 – 8 October 1879
- Monarch: Victoria
- Governor: George Phipps; Hercules Robinson
- Preceded by: Harry Atkinson
- Succeeded by: John Hall

3rd Governor of New Zealand
- In office 18 November 1845 – 3 January 1854
- Monarch: Victoria
- Preceded by: Robert FitzRoy
- Succeeded by: Sir Thomas Gore Browne
- In office 4 December 1861 – 5 February 1868
- Monarch: Victoria
- Premier: William Fox; Alfred Domett; Frederick Whitaker; Frederick Weld; Edward Stafford
- Preceded by: Sir Thomas Gore Browne
- Succeeded by: Sir George Bowen

Governor of Cape Colony
- In office 1854–1861
- Monarch: Victoria
- Preceded by: George Cathcart (Charles Henry Darling acting)
- Succeeded by: Philip Wodehouse (Robert Wynyard acting)

3rd Governor of South Australia
- In office 15 May 1841 – 25 October 1845
- Monarch: Victoria
- Preceded by: George Gawler
- Succeeded by: Frederick Robe

Personal details
- Born: 14 April 1812 Lisbon, Kingdom of Portugal
- Died: 19 September 1898 (aged 86) South Kensington, London, England
- Spouse: Eliza Spencer (m. 1839; died 1898)
- Children: 1
- Relatives: John Gray (uncle)
- Education: Royal Grammar School, Guildford; Royal Military College, Sandhurst
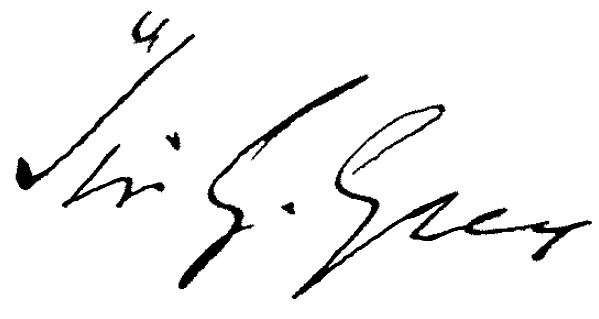
- Signature

Sir George Grey KCB (14 April 1812 – 19 September 1898) was a British soldier, explorer, colonial administrator and writer. He served in a succession of governing positions: Governor of South Australia, twice Governor of New Zealand, Governor of Cape Colony, and the 11th premier of New Zealand. He played a key role in the colonisation of New Zealand, and both the purchase and annexation of Māori land.

Grey was born in Lisbon, Portugal, just a few days after his father, Lieutenant-Colonel George Grey, was killed at the Battle of Badajoz in Spain. He was educated in England. After military service (1829–37) and two explorations in Western Australia (1837–39), Grey became Governor of South Australia in 1841. He oversaw the colony during a difficult formative period. Despite being less hands-on than his predecessor George Gawler, his fiscally responsible measures ensured the colony was in good shape by the time he departed for New Zealand in 1845.

Grey was the most influential figure during the European settlement of New Zealand. Governor of New Zealand initially from 1845 to 1853, he was governor during the initial stages of the New Zealand Wars. Learning Māori to fluency, he became a scholar of Māori culture, compiling Māori mythology and oral history and publishing it in translation in London. He developed a cordial relationship with the powerful rangatira Pōtatau Te Wherowhero of Tainui, in order to deter Ngāpuhi from invading Auckland. He was knighted in 1848. In 1854, Grey was appointed Governor of Cape Colony in South Africa, where his resolution of hostilities between indigenous South Africans and European settlers was praised by both sides. After separating from his wife and developing a severe opium addiction, Grey was again appointed Governor of New Zealand in 1861, three years after Te Wherowhero, who had established himself the first Māori King in Grey's absence, had died. The Kiingitanga (Maori King) posed a significant challenge to the British push for sovereignty, and with Ngāpuhi absent from the movement, Grey found himself challenged on two sides. He struggled to reuse his skills in negotiation to maintain peace with Māori, and his relationship with Te Wherowhero's successor Tāwhiao deeply soured. Turning on his former allies, Grey began an aggressive crackdown on Tainui and launched the Invasion of the Waikato in 1863, with 14,000 Imperial and colonial troops attacking 4,000 Māori and their families. Appointed in 1877, he served as Premier of New Zealand until 1879, where he remained a symbol of colonialism.

By political philosophy a Gladstonian liberal and Georgist, Grey eschewed the class system to be part of Auckland's new governance he helped to establish. Cyril Hamshere argues that Grey was a "great British proconsul", although he was also temperamental, demanding of associates, and lacking in some managerial abilities. For the wars of territorial expansion against Māori which he started, he remains a controversial and divisive figure in New Zealand.

== Early life ==
Grey was born in Lisbon, Portugal, the only son of Lieutenant-Colonel George Grey, of the 30th (Cambridgeshire) Regiment of Foot, who was killed at the Battle of Badajoz in Spain just a few days before. His mother, Elizabeth Anne née Vignoles, on the balcony of her hotel in Lisbon, overheard two officers speak of her husband's death and this brought on the premature birth of the child. She was the daughter of a retired soldier turned Irish clergyman, Major later Reverend John Vignoles. Grey's grandfather was Owen Wynne Gray (c. 1745 – 6 January 1819). Grey's uncle was John Gray, who was Owen Wynne Gray's son from his second marriage.

Grey was sent to board at the Royal Grammar School, Guildford in Surrey, but ran away and after some tutoring by the liberal idealist, Rev. Richard Whately, entered the Royal Military College, Sandhurst in 1826.

== Exploration ==
In 1837, at the age of 25, Grey led an ill-prepared expedition that explored North-West Australia. British settlers in Australia at the time knew little of the region and only one member of Grey's party had been there before. It was believed possible at that time that one of the world's largest rivers might drain into the Indian Ocean in North-West Australia; if that were found to be the case, the region it flowed through might be suitable for colonisation. Grey, with Lieutenant Franklin Lushington, of the 9th (East Norfolk) Regiment of Foot, offered to explore the region. Joining the party at Cape Town were Sapper Private Robert Mustard, J.C. Cox, Thomas Ruston, Evan Edwards, Henry Williams, and Robert Inglesby. In December they landed at Hanover Bay (west of Uwins Island in the Bonaparte Archipelago). Travelling south, the party traced the course of the Glenelg River. After experiencing boat wrecks, near-drowning, becoming completely lost, and Grey himself being speared in the hip during a skirmish with Aboriginal people, the party gave up. After being picked up by HMS Beagle and the schooner Lynher, they were taken to Mauritius to recover. Lieutenant Lushington was then mobilised to rejoin his regiment in the First Anglo-Afghan War. In September 1838 Grey sailed to Perth hoping to resume his adventures.

In February 1839 Grey embarked on a second exploration expedition to the north, where he was again wrecked with his party, again including Surgeon Walker, at Kalbarri. They were the first Europeans to see the Murchison River, but then had to walk to Perth, surviving the journey through the efforts of Kaiber, a Whadjuk Noongar man (that is, indigenous to the Perth region), who organised food and what water could be found (they survived by drinking liquid mud). At about this time, Grey learnt the Noongar language.

Due to his interest in Aboriginal culture in July 1839, Grey was promoted to captain and appointed temporary Resident Magistrate at King George Sound, Western Australia, following the death of Sir Richard Spencer, the previous Resident Magistrate.

== Marriage and children ==
On 2 November 1839 at King George Sound, Grey married Eliza Lucy Spencer (1822–1898), daughter of the late Government Resident, Sir Richard Spencer. Their only child, born in 1841 in South Australia, died aged five months and was buried at the West Terrace Cemetery. It was not a happy marriage. Grey, obstinate in his domestic affairs as in his first expedition, accused his wife unjustly of flirting with Rear-Admiral Sir Henry Keppel on the voyage to Cape Town taken in 1860, and sent her away. Per her obituary, she was an avid walker, reader of literature, devout churchwoman, exceptional hostess and valued friend in her life away from him. It was noted that she had keen insight into character. After their separation, Grey began the habitual abuse of opium, and struggled to regain his tenacity in maintaining peace between indigenous people and British colonisers.

Grey adopted Annie Maria Matthews (1853–1938) in 1861, following the death of her father, his half-brother, Sir Godfrey Thomas. She married Seymour Thorne George on 3 December 1872 on Kawau Island.

== Governor of South Australia ==
Grey was the third Governor of South Australia, from May 1841 to October 1845. Secretary of State for the Colonies, Lord John Russell, was impressed by Grey's report on governing indigenous people. This led to Grey's appointment as governor.

Grey replaced George Gawler, under whose stewardship the colony had become bankrupt through massive spending on public infrastructure. Gawler was also held responsible for the illegal retribution exacted by Major Thomas Shuldham O'Halloran on an Aboriginal tribe, some of whose members had murdered all 25 survivors of the Maria shipwreck. Grey was governor during another mass murder: the Rufus River Massacre, of at least 30 Aboriginals, by Europeans, on 27 August 1841.

Governor Grey sharply cut spending. The colony soon had full employment, and exports of primary products were increasing. Systematic emigration was resumed at the end of 1844. Gawler, to whom Grey ascribed every problem in the colony, undertook projects to alleviate unemployment that were of lasting value. The real salvation of the colony's finances was the discovery of copper at Burra Burra in 1845.

=== Aboriginal Witnesses Act ===
In 1844, Grey enacted a series ordinances and amendments first entitled the Aborigines' Evidence Act and later known as the Aboriginal Witnesses Act. The act, which was created to "facilitate the admission of the unsworn testimony of Aboriginal inhabitants of South Australia and parts adjacent", stipulated that unsworn testimony given by Australian Aboriginals would be inadmissible in court. A major consequence of the act in the following decades in Australian history was the frequent dismissal of evidence given by Indigenous Australians in massacres perpetrated against them by European settlers.

== First term as governor of New Zealand ==
Grey served as Governor of New Zealand twice: from 1845 to 1853, and from 1861 to 1868.

During this time, European settlement accelerated, and in 1859 the number of Pākehā came to equal the number of Māori, at around 60,000 each. Settlers were keen to obtain land and some Māori were willing to sell, but there were also strong pressures to retain land – in particular from the Māori King Movement. Grey had to manage the demand for land for the settlers to farm and the commitments in the Treaty of Waitangi that the Māori chiefs retained full "exclusive and undisturbed possession of their Lands and Estates Forests Fisheries and other properties." The treaty also specifies that Māori will sell land only to the Crown. The potential for conflict between the Māori and settlers was exacerbated as the British authorities progressively eased restrictions on land sales after an agreement at the end of 1840 between the company and Colonial Secretary Lord John Russell, which provided for land purchases by the New Zealand Company from the Crown at a discount price, and a charter to buy and sell land under government supervision. Money raised by the government from sales to the company would be spent on assisting migration to New Zealand. The agreement was hailed by the company as "all that we could desire ... our Company is really to be the agent of the state for colonizing NZ." The Government waived its right of pre-emption in the Wellington region, Wanganui and New Plymouth in September 1841.

Following his term as Governor of South Australia, Grey was appointed the third Governor of New Zealand in 1845. During the tenure of his predecessor, Robert FitzRoy, violence over land ownership had broken out in the Wairau Valley in the South Island in June 1843, in what became known as the Wairau Affray (FitzRoy was later dismissed from office by the Colonial Office for his handling of land issues). It was only in 1846 that the war leader Te Rauparaha was arrested and imprisoned by Governor Grey without charge, which remained controversial amongst the Ngāti Toa people.

George Grey was responsible for the Enderby Whaling Settlement in the subantarctic Auckland Islands 1849–52; the main problems were closing it in 1852 and disputes between the participants.

=== Hōne Heke and the Flagstaff War ===
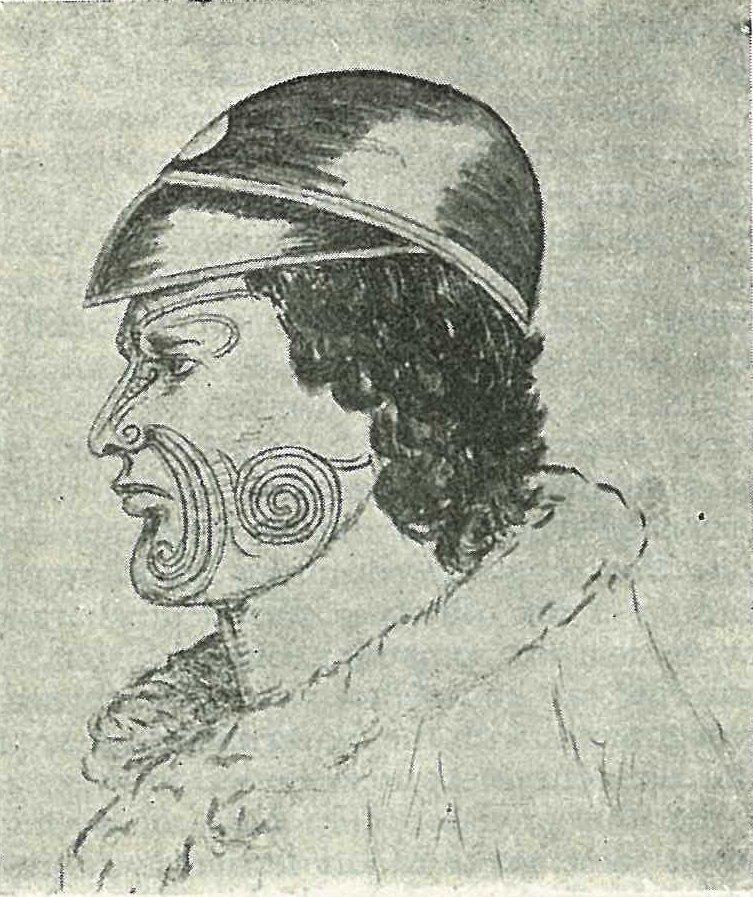
Drawing of Hōne Heke, who opposed Grey's governorship

In March 1845, Māori chief Hōne Heke began the Flagstaff War, the causes of which can be attributed to the conflict between what the Ngāpuhi understood to be the meaning of the Treaty of Waitangi (1840) and the actions of succeeding governors of asserting authority over the Māori. On 18 November 1845 George Grey arrived in New Zealand to take up his appointment as governor, where he was greeted by outgoing Governor FitzRoy, who worked amicably with Grey before departing in January 1846. At this time, Hōne Heke challenged the British authorities, beginning by cutting down the flagstaff on Flagstaff Hill at Kororareka. On this flagstaff the flag of the United Tribes of New Zealand had previously flown; now the Union Jack was hoisted; hence the flagstaff symbolised the grievances of Heke and his ally Te Ruki Kawiti, as to changes that had followed the signing of the Treaty of Waitangi.

There were many causes of the Flagstaff War and Heke had a number of grievances in relation to the Treaty of Waitangi. While land acquisition by the Church Missionary Society (CMS) were politicised, the rebellion led by Heke was directed against the colonial forces with the CMS missionaries trying to persuade Heke to end the fighting. Despite the fact that Tāmati Wāka Nene and most of Ngāpuhi sided with the government, the small and ineptly led British had been beaten at Battle of Ohaeawai. Backed by financial support, far more troops, armed with 32-pounder cannons that had been denied to FitzRoy, Grey ordered the attack on Kawiti's fortress at Ruapekapeka on 31 December 1845. This forced Kawiti to retreat. Ngāpuhi were astonished that the British could keep an army of nearly 1,000 soldiers in the field continuously. Heke's confidence waned after he was wounded in battle with Tāmati Wāka Nene and his warriors, and by the realisation that the British had far more resources than he could muster; his enemies included some Pākehā Māori supporting colonial forces.

After the Battle of Ruapekapeka, Heke and Kawiti were ready for peace. It was Tāmati Wāka Nene they approached to act as intermediary in negotiations with Governor Grey, who accepted the advice of Nene that Heke and Kawiti should not be punished for their rebellion. The fighting in the north ended and there was no punitive confiscation of Ngāpuhi land.

=== Ngāti Rangatahi and Hutt Valley campaign ===
Colonists arrived at Port Nicholson, Wellington, in November 1839 in ships chartered by the New Zealand Company. Within months the New Zealand Company purported to purchase approximately 20 million acres (8.1 million hectares) in Nelson, Wellington, Whanganui and Taranaki. Disputes arose as to the validity of purchases of land, which remained unresolved when Grey became governor.

The company saw itself as a prospective government of New Zealand and in 1845 and 1846 proposed splitting the colony in two, along a line from Mōkau in the west to Cape Kidnappers in the east – with the north reserved for Māori and missionaries. The south would become a self-governing province, known as "New Victoria" and managed by the company for that purpose. Britain's Colonial Secretary rejected the proposal. The company was known for its vigorous attacks on those it perceived as its opponents – the British Colonial Office, successive governors of New Zealand, and the Church Missionary Society (CMS) that was led by the Reverend Henry Williams. Williams attempted to interfere with the land purchasing practices of the company, which exacerbated the ill-will that was directed at the CMS by the Company in Wellington and the promoters of colonisation in Auckland who had access to the Governor and to the newspapers that had started publication.

Unresolved land disputes that had resulted from New Zealand Company operations erupted into fighting in the Hutt Valley in 1846. Ngāti Rangatahi were determined to retain possession of their land. They assembled a force of about 200 warriors led by Te Rangihaeata, Te Rauparaha's nephew (son of his sister Waitohi, died 1839), also the person who had killed unarmed captives in Wairau Affray. Governor Grey moved troops into the area and by February had assembled nearly a thousand men together with some Māori allies from Te Āti Awa to begin the Hutt Valley campaign.

Māori attacked Taitā on 3 March 1846, but were repulsed by a company of the 96th Regiment. The same day, Grey declared martial law in the Wellington area.

Richard Taylor, a CMS missionary from Whanganui, attempted to persuade Ngāti Tama and Ngāti Rangatahi to leave the disputed land. Eventually Grey paid compensation for the potato crop they had planted on the land. He also gave them 300 acres (120 ha) at Kaiwharawhara by the modern ferry terminal. Chief Taringakuri agreed to these terms. But when the settlers tried to move onto the land they were frightened off. On 27 February, the British and their Te Āti Awa allies burnt the Māori pā at Maraenuku in the Hutt Valley, which had been built on land that the settlers claimed to own. Ngāti Rangatahi retaliated on 1 and 3 March by raiding settlers' farms, destroying furniture, smashing windows, killing pigs, and threatening the settlers with death if they gave the alarm. They murdered Andrew Gillespie and his son. Thirteen families of settlers moved into Wellington for safety. Governor Grey proclaimed martial law on 3 March. Sporadic fighting continued, including a major attack on a defended position at Boulcott's Farm on 6 May. On 6 August 1846, one of the last engagements was fought – the Battle of Battle Hill – after which Te Rangihaeata left the area. The Hutt Valley campaign was followed by the Wanganui campaign from April to July 1847.

In January 1846, fifteen chiefs of the area, including Te Rauparaha, had sent a combined letter to the newly arrived Governor Grey, pledging their loyalty to the British Crown. After intercepting letters from Te Rauparaha, Grey realised he was playing a double game. He was receiving and sending secret instructions to the local Māori who were attacking settlers. In a surprise attack on his pā at Taupō (now named Plimmerton) at dawn on 23 July, Te Rauparaha, who was now quite elderly, was captured and taken prisoner. The justification given for his arrest was weapons supplied to Māori deemed to be in open rebellion against the Crown. However, charges were never laid against Te Rauparaha so his detention was declared unlawful. While Grey's declaration of Martial law was within his authority, internment without trial would only be lawful if it had been authorised by statute. Te Rauparaha was held prisoner on HMS Driver, then he was taken to Auckland on HMS Calliope where he remained imprisoned until January 1848.

His son Tāmihana was studying Christianity in Auckland and Te Rauparaha gave him a solemn message that their iwi should not take utu against the government. Tāmihana returned to his rohe to stop a planned uprising. Tāmihana sold the Wairau land to the government for 3,000 pounds. Grey spoke to Te Rauaparaha and persuaded him to give up all outstanding claims to land in the Wairau valley. Then, realising he was old and sick he allowed Te Rauparaha to return to his people at Ōtaki in 1848.

=== Government at Auckland ===
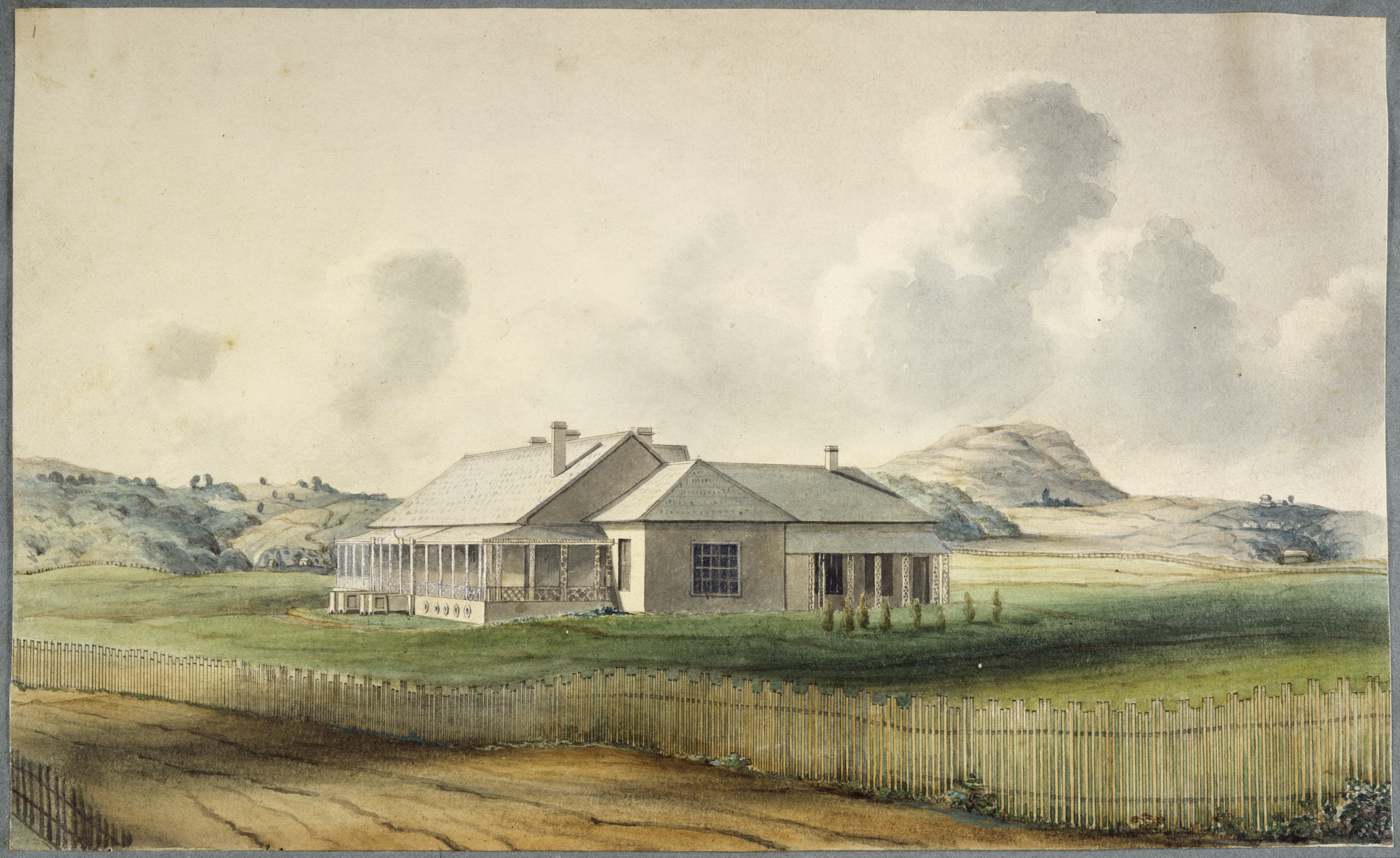
Government House in Auckland, as painted by Edward Ashworth in 1842 or 1843

Auckland was made the new capital in March 1841 and by the time Grey was appointed governor in 1845, it had become a commercial centre as well as including the administrative institutions such as the Supreme Court. After the conclusion of the war in the north, government policy was to place a buffer zone of European settlement between the Ngāpuhi and the city of Auckland. The background to the Invasion of Waikato in 1863 also, in part, reflected a belief that the Auckland was at risk from attack by the Waikato Māori.

Grey had to contend with newspapers that were unequivocal to their support of the interests of the settlers: the Auckland Times, Auckland Chronicle, The Southern Cross, which started by William Brown as a weekly paper in 1843 and The New Zealander, which was started in 1845 by John Williamson. These newspapers were known for their partisan editorial policies – both William Brown and John Williamson were aspiring politicians. The Southern Cross supported the land claimants, such as the New Zealand Company, and vigorously attacked Governor Grey's administration, while The New Zealander, supported the ordinary settler and the Māori. The northern war adversely affected business in Auckland, such that The Southern Cross stopped publishing from April 1845 to July 1847. Hugh Carleton, who also became a politician, was the editor of The New Zealander then later established the Anglo-Maori Warder, which followed an editorial policy in opposition to Governor Grey.

At the time of the northern war The Southern Cross and The New Zealander blamed Henry Williams and the other CMS missionaries for the Flagstaff War. The New Zealander newspaper in a thinly disguised reference to Henry Williams, with the reference to "their Rangatira pakeha [gentlemen] correspondents", went on to state:

We consider these English traitors far more guilty and deserving of severe punishment than the brave natives whom they have advised and misled. Cowards and knaves in the full sense of the terms, they have pursued their traitorous schemes, afraid to risk their own persons, yet artfully sacrificing others for their own aggrandizement, while, probably at the same time, they were most hypocritically professing most zealous loyalty.

Official communications also blamed the CMS missionaries for the Flagstaff War. In a letter of 25 June 1846 to William Ewart Gladstone, the Colonial Secretary in Sir Robert Peel's government, Governor Grey referred to the land acquired by the CMS missionaries and commented that "Her Majesty's Government may also rest satisfied that these individuals cannot be put in possession of these tracts of land without a large expenditure of British blood and money". By the end of his first term as governor, Grey had changed his opinion as to the role of the CMS missionaries, which was limited to attempts to persuade Hōne Heke bring an end to the fighting with the British soldiers and the Ngāpuhi, led by Tāmati Wāka Nene, who remained loyal to the Crown.

Grey was "shrewd and manipulative" and his main objective was to impose British sovereignty over New Zealand, which he did by force when he felt it necessary. But his first strategy to attain land was to attack the close relationship between missionaries and Māori, including Henry Williams who had relationships with chiefs.

In 1847 William Williams published a pamphlet that defended the role of the CMS in the years leading up to the war in the north. The first Anglican bishop of New Zealand, George Selwyn, took the side of Grey in relation to the purchase of the land. Grey twice failed to recover the land in the Supreme Court, and when Williams refused to give up the land unless the charges were retracted, he was dismissed from the CMS in November 1849. Governor Grey's first term of office ended in 1853. In 1854 Williams was reinstated to CMS after Bishop Selwyn later regretted the position and George Grey addressed the committee of the CMS and requested his reinstatement.

When he returned to New Zealand in 1861 for his second term as governor, Sir George and Henry Williams meet at the Waimate Mission Station in November 1861. Also in 1861 Henry Williams' son Edward Marsh Williams was appointed by Sir George to be the Resident Magistrate for the Bay of Islands and Northern Districts.

=== Self-government and Constitution Acts ===
Following a campaign for self-government by settlers in 1846, the Parliament of the United Kingdom passed the New Zealand Constitution Act 1846, granting the colony self-government for the first time, requiring Māori to pass an English-language test to be able to participate in the new colonial government. In his instructions to Grey, Colonial Secretary Earl Grey (no relation to George Grey) sent the 1846 Constitution Act with instructions to implement self-government. George Grey responded to Earl Grey that the Act would lead to further hostilities and that the settlers were not ready for self-government. In a dispatch to Earl Grey, Governor Grey stated that in implementing the Act, Her Majesty would not be giving the self-government that was intended, instead:

"...she will give to a small fraction of her subjects of one race the power of governing the large majority of her subjects of a different race... there is no reason to think that they would be satisfied with, and submit to, the rule of a minority"

Earl Grey agreed and in December 1847 introduced an Act suspending most of the 1846 Constitution Act. Grey wrote a draft of a new Constitution Act while camping on Mount Ruapehu in 1851, forwarding this draft to the Colonial Office later that year. Grey's draft established both provincial and central representative assemblies, allowed for Māori districts and a Governor elected by the General Assembly. Only the latter proposal was rejected by the Parliament of the United Kingdom when it adopted Grey's constitution, the New Zealand Constitution Act 1852.

Grey was briefly appointed Governor-in-Chief on 1 January 1848, while he oversaw the establishment of the first provinces of New Zealand, New Ulster and New Munster.

==== Treaty obligations ====
In 1846, Lord Stanley, the British Colonial Secretary, who was a devout Anglican, three times British Prime Minister and oversaw the passage of the Slavery Abolition Act 1833, was asked by Governor Grey how far he was expected to abide by the Treaty of Waitangi. The direct response in the Queen's name was:

You will honourably and scrupulously fulfil the conditions of the Treaty of Waitangi...

Following the election of the first parliament in 1853, responsible government was instituted in 1856. The direction of "native affairs" was kept at the sole discretion of the governor, meaning control of Māori affairs and land remained outside of the elected ministry. This quickly became a point of contention between the Governor and the colonial parliament, who retained their own "Native Secretary" to advise them on "native affairs". In 1861, Governor Grey agreed to consult the ministers in relation to native affairs, but this position only lasted until his recall from office in 1867. Grey's successor as governor, George Bowen, took direct control of native affairs until his term ended in 1870. From then on, the elected ministry, led by the Premier, controlled the colonial government's policy on Māori land.

The short-term effect of the treaty was to prevent the sale of Māori land to anyone other than the Crown. This was intended to protect Māori from the kinds of shady land purchases which had alienated indigenous peoples in other parts of the world from their land with minimal compensation. Before the treaty had been finalised the New Zealand Company had made several hasty land deals and shipped settlers from Great Britain to New Zealand, hoping the British would be forced to accept its land claims as a fait accompli, in which it was largely successful.

In part, the treaty was an attempt to establish a system of property rights for land with the Crown controlling and overseeing land sale to prevent abuse. Initially, this worked well with the Governor and his representatives having the sole right to buy and sell land from the Māori. Māori were eager to sell land, and settlers eager to buy.

=== Legacy of Grey's first term as Governor ===
Grey took pains to tell Māori that he had observed the terms of the Treaty of Waitangi, assuring them that their land rights would be fully recognised. In the Taranaki district, Māori were very reluctant to sell their land, but elsewhere Grey was much more successful, and nearly 33 million acres (130,000 km^{2}) were purchased from Māori, with the result that British settlements expanded quickly. Grey was less successful in his efforts to assimilate Māori; he lacked the financial means to realise his plans. Although he subsidised mission schools, requiring them to teach in English, only a few hundred Māori children attended them at any one time.

During Grey's first tenure as Governor of New Zealand, he was created a Knight Commander of the Order of the Bath (1848). When Grey was knighted he chose Tāmati Wāka Nene as one of his esquires.

Grey gave land for the establishment of Auckland Grammar School in Newmarket, Auckland in 1850. The school was officially recognised as an educational establishment in 1868 through the Auckland Grammar School Appropriation Act of the Provincial Government. Grey's collection of Māori artefacts, one of the earliest from New Zealand and assembled during his first governorship, was donated to the British Museum in 1854.

Much of Grey's manuscript collections were donated to the Auckland Free Public Library in 1887, one of the first substantial donations to the library. Grey's Māori manuscript collections held at Auckland Libraries were added to the UNESCO Memory of the World Register in 2011.

== Governor of Cape Colony ==
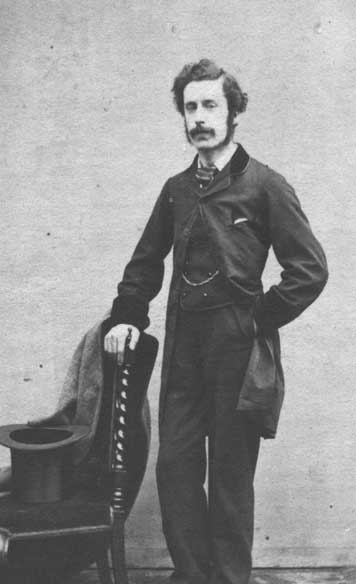
Portrait of Sir George Grey as Governor of the Cape Colony

Grey was Governor of Cape Colony from 5 December 1854 to 15 August 1861. He founded Grey College, Bloemfontein in 1855 and was the benefactor for Grey High School in Port Elizabeth, founded by John Paterson in 1856. In 1859 he laid the foundation stone of the New Somerset Hospital, Cape Town. When he left the Cape in 1861 he presented the National Library of South Africa with a remarkable personal collection of medieval and Renaissance manuscripts and rare books.

He began his term as governor a few years following the Convict Crisis of 1849, an event that significantly influenced Cape politics until the establishment of responsible government in 1872. Grey faced a growing rivalry between the eastern and western halves of the Cape Colony, as well as a small, but also growing, movement for local democracy ("responsible government") and greater independence from British rule. "There were moves for responsible government in the Cape Parliament in 1855 and 1856 but they were defeated by a combination of Western conservatives and Easterners anxious about the defence of the frontier under a responsible system. But undoubtedly Sir George Grey's political ability, charm and force of personality – aided by the parliamentary leadership of liberal-minded Attorney-General, William Porter – contributed to this result."

== Second term as governor of New Zealand ==
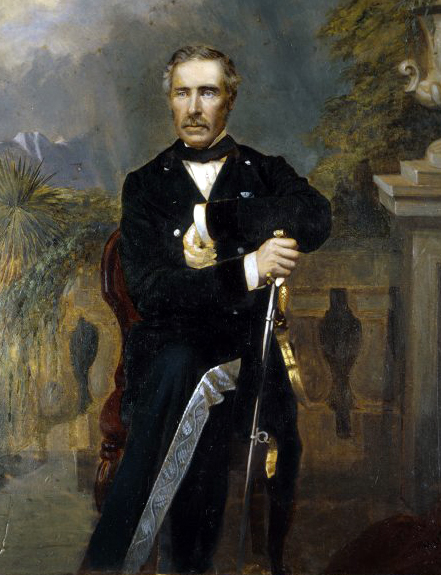
Painting of Sir George Grey by Daniel Louis Mundy 1860s

Grey was again appointed governor in 1861, to replace Governor Thomas Gore Browne, serving until 1868. His second term as governor was greatly different from the first, as he had to deal with the demands of an elected parliament, which had been established in 1852.

=== Invasion of the Waikato ===
Immediately prior to Grey's re-appointment as governor, there were rising tensions in Taranaki over land ownership and sovereignty that eventually led to the involvement of British military forces at Waitara, in what is called the First Taranaki War, from March 1860 until the fighting subsided in 1862.

The leaders of the King movement or Kīngitanga had written a letter to Governor Browne stating that the Waikato tribes had never signed the Treaty of Waitangi and that they were a separate nation. Browne regarded the stance of the Kīngitanga as an act of disloyalty; and prepared plans for the invasion of Waikato, in part to uphold "the Queen's supremacy" in the face of the Kīngitanga challenge.

Grey launched the invasion of the Waikato in June 1863 amid mounting tension between Kingites and the colonial government and fears of a violent raid on Auckland by Kingite Māori. Grey used as the trigger for the invasion Kingite rejection of his ultimatum on 9 July 1863 that all Māori living between Auckland and the Waikato take an oath of allegiance to Queen Victoria or be expelled south of the Waikato River.

The war brought thousands of Imperial British troops to New Zealand: 18,000 men served in the British forces at some point during the campaign, with a peak of about 14,000 troops in March 1864.

The subsequent invasion included the Battle of Rangiriri (November 1863)—which cost both sides more men than any other engagement of the New Zealand Wars—and the attack on Rangiaowhia (February 1864) a village largely occupied by women, children and older men.

The campaign ended with the retreat of the Kingitanga Māori into the rugged interior of the North Island and the colonial government confiscating about 12,000 km^{2} of Māori land. The defeat and confiscations left the King Movement tribes with a legacy of poverty and bitterness that was partly assuaged in 1995 when the government conceded that the 1863 invasion and confiscation was wrongful and apologised for its actions.

In the later 1860s, the British government determined to withdraw Imperial troops from New Zealand. At the time the Māori chiefs Te Kooti and Tītokowaru had the colonial government and settlers extremely alarmed with a series of military successes. With the support of the Premier Edward Stafford, Grey evaded instructions from the Colonial Office to finalise the return of the regiments, which had commenced in 1865 and 1866. In the end, the British government recalled (removed) Grey from the office of governor in February 1868. He was replaced by Sir George Bowen and during his term hostilities concluded with the abandoned pursuit of war leader Riwha Tītokowaru – again in Taranaki – in 1869.

=== Legacy ===
Grey was greatly respected by some Māori and often travelled with a company of chiefs. He induced leading chiefs to write down their accounts of Māori traditions, legends and customs. His principal informant, Te Rangikāheke, taught Grey to speak Māori. Historian Michael King noted:

He learned Māori and persuaded Māori authorities to commit their legends and traditions to writing, some of which were subsequently published ... His collected papers would turn out to be the largest single repository of Māori-language manuscripts.

Grey bought Kawau Island in 1862, on his return to New Zealand for a second term as governor. For 25 years, he lavished large amounts of his personal wealth on developing the island. He enlarged and remodelled Mansion House, the former residence of the copper mine superintendent. Here he planted a huge array of native and non-native trees and shrubs, and acclimatised many exotic birds and other animal species. The invasive species he introduced included pine trees and Australian marsupials (possum and wallabies), which went on to become significant weeds and pests. He also amassed a celebrated collection of rare books and manuscripts, many purchased from the Auckland bibliophile Henry Shaw, artworks and curiosities, plus artefacts from Māori.

== Return to England ==
On his return journey to England from New Zealand, Grey worked on preparing previously compiled Māori myths for publication; this work led to Ko Nga Mahinga a Nga Tupuna Maori and the English translation Polynesian Mythology and Ancient Traditional History of the New Zealand Race as Furnished by Their Priests and Chiefs. Polynesian Mythology was well received by the European public, with Grey receiving many letters of praise. In particular, the story of Hinemoa was popular enough to inspire Alfred Domett's novel Ranolf and Amohia, Nicholas Chevalier's painting Hinemoa, and New Zealand's first feature film in 1914.

Although by philosophy Grey was a liberal, his extremist views on the questions of the British Empire, of emigration, of Home Rule for Ireland and the cause of the English poor were contrary to the interests of Gladstone's Liberal government. Grey was marked as a "dangerous man". In 1870, at a parliamentary by-election for the Borough of Newark that followed the death of the sitting Liberal MP, Grey stood as an independent liberal against Gladstone's Liberal candidate Sir Henry Knight Storks. Determined that Grey should not be elected and seeing that splitting the Liberal vote would result in both Grey and Storks losing to the Conservative candidate, the Liberal government engineered an arrangement where both would withdraw, leaving another Liberal candidate, Samuel Boteler Bristowe, to take the seat. Storks was rewarded with the post of Surveyor-General of the Ordnance and Grey returned to New Zealand later that year.

== Premier of New Zealand ==
New Zealand Parliament
Years	Term	Electorate	Party
1875	5th	Auckland West	Independent
1876–1879	6th	Thames	Independent
1879–1881	7th	Thames	Independent
1881–1884	8th	Auckland East	Independent
1884–1887	9th	Auckland East	Independent
1887–1890	10th	Auckland Central	Independent
1891–1893	11th	Newton	Independent
1893–1895	12th	Auckland	Independent

In 1875 Sir George was elected Superintendent of Auckland Province (24 March 1875 – 31 October 1875). He stood in the general election for both the Auckland West and the Thames electorates in the 1875–1876 general election. In the two-member Auckland electorate, only Grey and Patrick Dignan were put forward as candidates, and were thus declared elected on 22 December 1875. The two-member Thames electorate was contested by six candidates, including Julius Vogel (who was Premier in 1875), William Rowe and Charles Featherstone Mitchell. On election day (6 January 1876), Grey attracted the highest number of votes and, unexpectedly, Rowe beat Vogel into second place (Vogel also stood in Wanganui, where he was returned). Hence Grey and Rowe were declared elected for Thames. A protest against Grey's election was lodged with the returning officer the following day, protesting that Grey had not been eligible to stand in Thames as he had already been elected in Auckland West. This petition was filed to the House of Representatives at the end of January.

With this controversy going on for several months unresolved, Grey advised in mid-June 1876 in a series of telegrams that he had chosen to represent Auckland West. On 8 July, the report of the committee inquiring into his election for Thames was read to the House. It was found that this was in accordance with the law, but that he had to make a decision for which electorate he would sit. On 15 July 1876, Grey announced that he would represent Thames, and he moved that a by-election be held in Auckland West for the seat that he would vacate there.

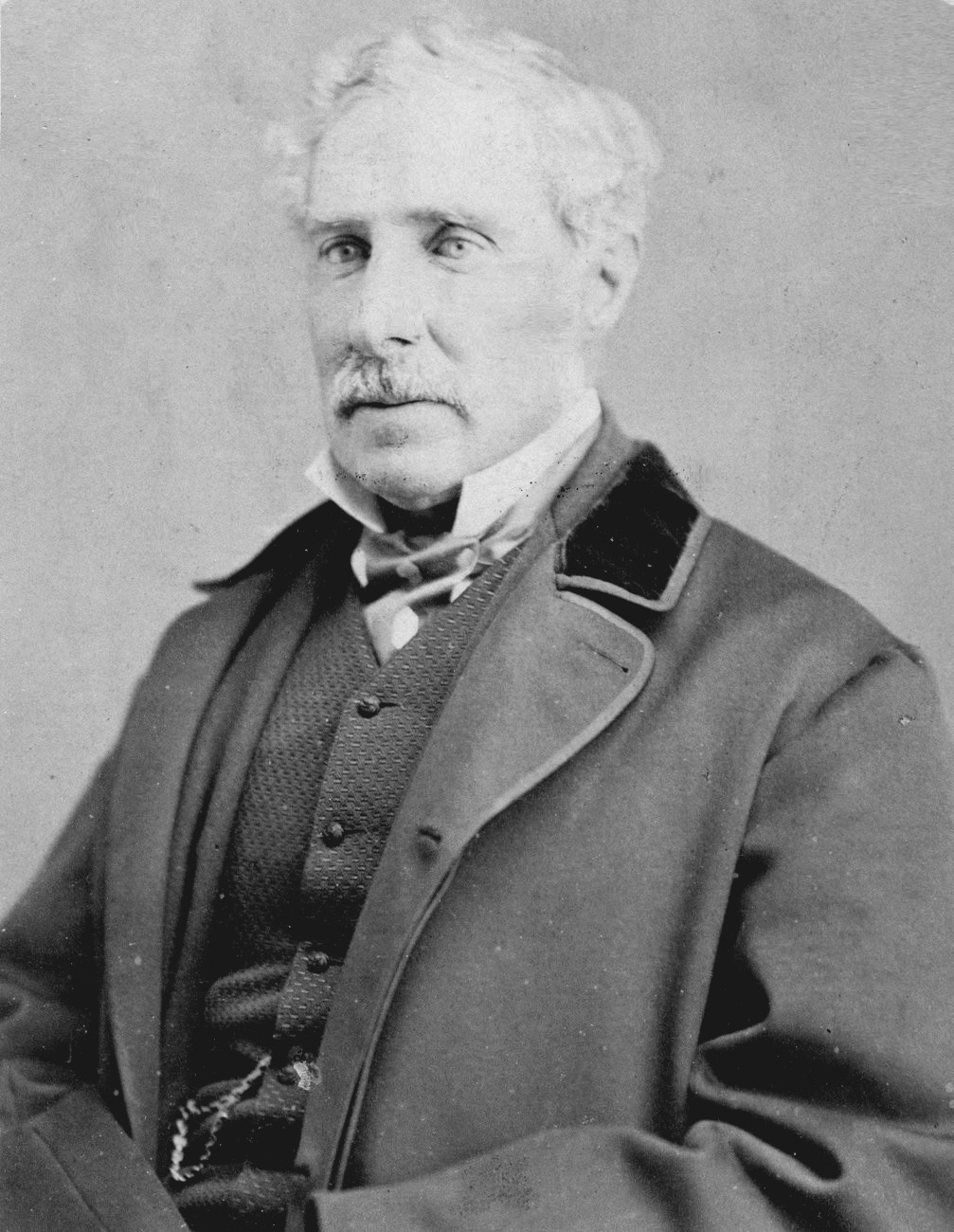
Cabinet portrait of Grey, 1885

Grey opposed the abolition of the provinces, but his opposition proved ineffective; the provincial system was abolished in 1876. On defeating Harry Atkinson on 13 October 1877 in a vote of no confidence, he was elected Premier by Parliament. He asked Governor Lord Normanby for a dissolution of parliament but was flatly refused. Grey thought New Zealand's unique constitutional provincialism was under threat, so championed radical causes, such as one man-one vote. An economic downturn in 1878 put pressure on incomes; defection across the floor of the house of four Auckland members defeated Grey on a vote in October 1879. He resigned as prime minister. Grey described his philosophical radicalism:

This is a revolt against despotism…. What I am resolved to maintain is this, that there shall be equal justice in representation and in the distribution of land and revenue to every class in New Zealand … equal rights to all – equal rights in education, equal rights in taxation, equal rights in representation … equal rights in every respect.

His government did not operate particularly well, with Grey seeking to dominate the government came into conflict with the governor. His term as premier is regarded by historians as a failure. Towards the end of 1879, Grey's government got into difficulties over land tax. Eventually, Grey asked for an early election, in 1879.

Grey was elected in both the Thames and the City of Christchurch electorates in September 1879. Grey came first in the three-member Christchurch electorate (Samuel Paull Andrews and Edward Stevens came second with equal numbers of votes, 23 votes ahead of Edward Richardson). Richardson petitioned against Grey's return on technical grounds, as Grey had already been elected in the Thames electorate. The electoral commission unseated Grey on 24 October, effective 28 October, with Richardson declared elected to the vacancy on that date. Grey kept the Thames seat and remained a member of parliament through that electorate.

In the 1881 election, Grey was elected in Auckland East and re-elected in the 1884 election. In the 1887 election Grey was returned for the Auckland Central electorate.

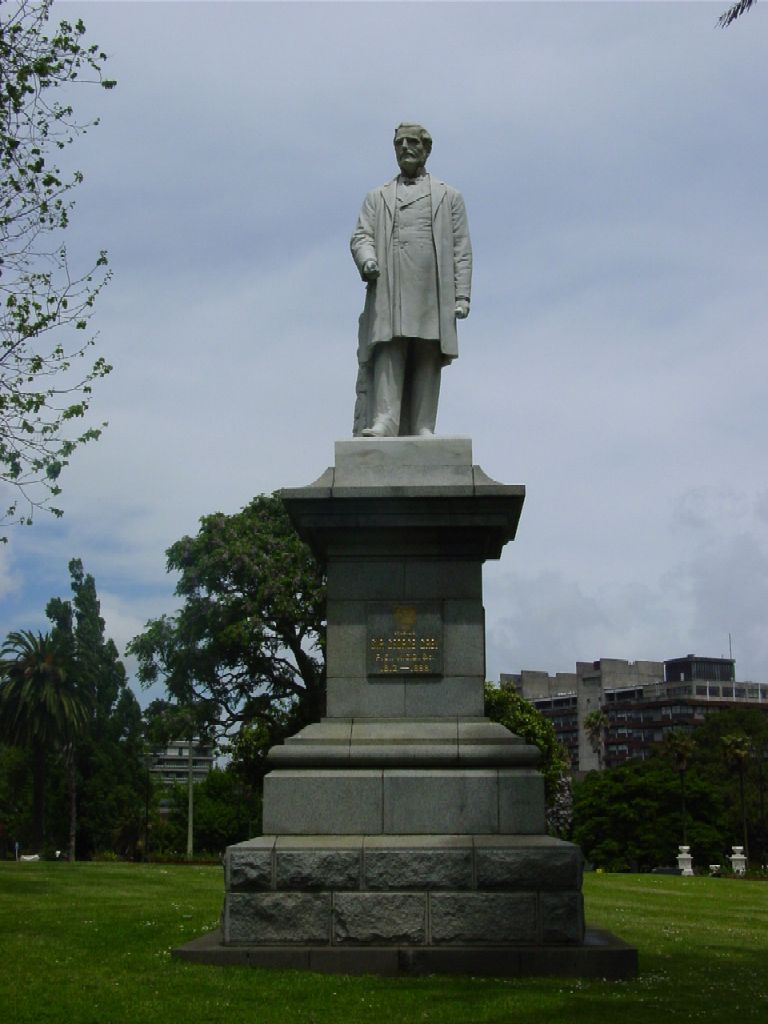
Statue of Sir George Grey in Albert Park, Auckland

In 1889, recalling his earlier proposal for the Governor to be elected from his first draft of the 1852 Constitution Act, Grey put forward the Election of Governor Bill, which would have allowed for a "British subject" to be elected to the office of Governor "precisely as an ordinary parliamentary election in each district."

By now Grey was suffering from ill health and he retired from politics in 1890, leaving for Australia to recuperate. While in Australia, he took part in the Australian Federal Convention. On returning to New Zealand, a deputation requested him to contest the Newton seat in Auckland in the 1891 by-election. The retiring member, David Goldie, also asked Grey to take his seat. Grey was prepared to put his name forward only if the election was unopposed, as he did not want to suffer the excitement of a contested election. Grey declared his candidacy on 25 March 1891. On 6 April 1891, he was declared elected, as he was unopposed. In December 1893, Grey was again elected, this time to Auckland City. He left for England in 1894 and did not return to New Zealand. He resigned his seat in 1895.

== Death ==
Grey died at his residence at the Norfolk Hotel, Harrington Road, South Kensington, London, on 19 September 1898, aged 86 years, and was buried in St Paul's Cathedral.

== Places and institutions named after Grey ==
The Grey Glacier in the Southern Alps was named after Grey, probably by Julius von Haast. Grey represented the Newton electorate in Auckland, named after the Borough of Newton. In 1901, the area was renamed as Grey Lynn to honour the late Sir George. The Grey River in the South Island's West Coast Region (and thus indirectly the town of Greymouth at the river's mouth), was named for the statesman by Thomas Brunner. There is a Mount Grey on Kawau Island, named after the island's owner. There is a Mount Grey west of Amberley, which was climbed in 1849 by John Lort Stokes and William John Warburton Hamilton; it is thought that Stokes bestowed the name for George Grey. Greytown in the Wairarapa region was named at a farewell dinner in Wellington on 16 March 1854; the name was bestowed by Joseph Masters, who had founded the Wairarapa Small Farms Association. The South Australian Federal Electorate of Grey was named in his honour.

== Taxa named after Grey ==
Menetia greyii, a species of lizard, is named after Grey. Other animal taxa named in his honour include two mammals and a bird.

The genus Greyia (wild bottlebrush) which is endemic to southern Africa was also named after him.

== Popular culture and depiction in art ==
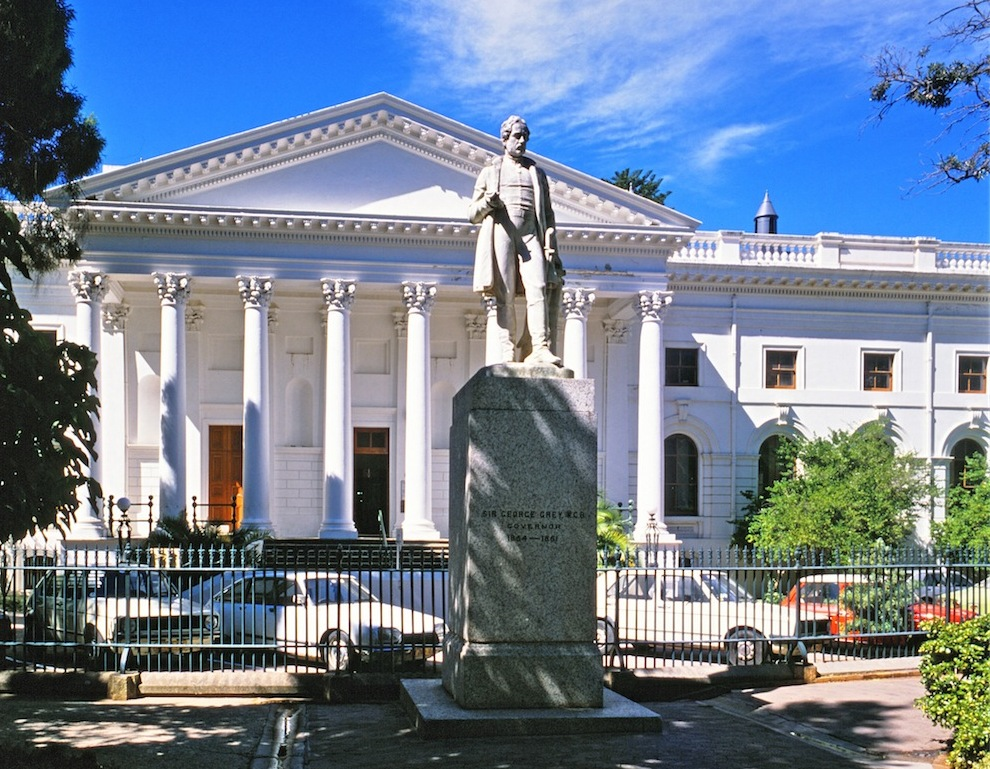
Statue of George Grey (1863) by William Calder Marshall in Cape Town, South Africa

A statue of George Grey created by William Calder Marshall was unveiled at the Company's Garden in Cape Town, South Africa in 1863. Sculptor Anton Teutenberg created a relief sculpture of Grey as a part of his commission for the Auckland High Court in 1866. In 1904, a statue of George Grey was erected on the corner of Greys Avenue and Queen Street, later moved to Albert Park in 1922. Grey's statue has been the target of vandalism and activism, including in 1987, when the head of the statue was broken off on Waitangi Day.

The Governor, an historical drama miniseries based on Grey's life, was made by TVNZ and the National Film Unit in 1977, featuring Corin Redgrave in the title role. Despite critical acclaim, the miniseries attracted controversy at the time because of its then-large budget.

== Coat of arms ==
Coat of arms of George Grey
Notes The arms of George Grey consist of: Crest An unicorn passant ermine, armed, maned, tufted and unguled or, in front of a sun in splendour. Escutcheon Barry of six argent and azure, in chief three pellets (Note: Other sources give torteaux (i.e. a red roundel) instead of pellets.) and label of three points ermine. Motto Stabilis (Steadfast)

== See also ==
- Historical Records of Australia
- History of Adelaide
- History of Cape Colony from 1806 to 1870
- Serle, Percival (1949). "Grey, Sir George". Dictionary of Australian Biography. Sydney: Angus & Robertson.
- Polynesian Mythology (book)

Government offices
Preceded by Colonel George Gawler	Governor of South Australia; 1841–1845	Succeeded by Lieutenant-Colonel Frederick Robe
Preceded by Captain Robert FitzRoy	Governor of New Zealand; 1845–1854; 1861–1868	Succeeded by Colonel Thomas Gore Browne
Preceded by Colonel Thomas Gore Browne	Governor of New Zealand; 1845–1854; 1861–1868	Succeeded by Sir George Bowen
Preceded by George Cathcart; Charles Henry Darling (acting)	Governor of Cape Colony; 1854–1861	Succeeded by Robert Wynyard (acting); Sir Philip Wodehouse
Preceded by Harry Atkinson	Premier of New Zealand; 1877–1879	Succeeded by John Hall
Political offices
Preceded by Maurice O'Rorke	Superintendent of Auckland Province; 1875–1876	Provincial Councils abolished
New Zealand Parliament
Preceded by Charles O'Neill	Member of Parliament for Thames; 1876–1881; Served alongside: William Rowe, John Sheehan	Succeeded by John Sheehan
Preceded by William Speight	Member of Parliament for Auckland East; 1881–1887	Vacant Constituency abolished, recreated in 1905 Title next held by Frederick Baume
New constituency	Member of Parliament for Auckland Central; 1887–1890	Vacant Constituency abolished, recreated in 1905 Title next held by Alfred Kidd
Preceded by David Goldie	Member of Parliament for Newton; 1891–1893	Constituency abolished
Preceded by Alfred Cadman; John Shera; Thomas Thompson	Member of Parliament for Auckland; 1893–1895; Served alongside: Charles Button, William Crowther	Succeeded by Thomas Thompson
