= Japanese Lantern Monument =

Memorial in Cape Town, South Africa

Coordinates: 33°55′33″S 018°25′6″E

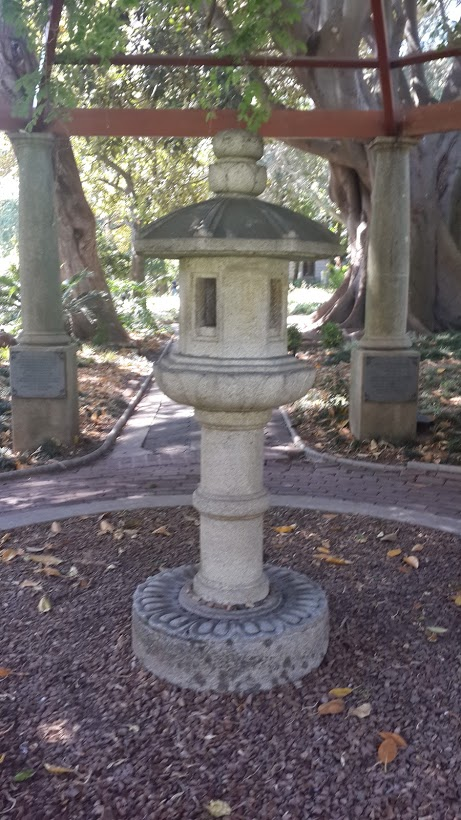
- Japanese Lantern Monument, Company's Garden.
- Interactive map of Japanese Lantern Monument
- Location: Company's Garden, Cape Town, South Africa
- Material: granite
- Opening date: 1932
- Dedicated to: "This stone lantern was presented to Cape Town by the Government of Japan as a token of appreciation of the kindness shown to Japanese emigrants. Erected August 1932."

The Japanese Lantern Monument is a symbol of political relations between the Japanese government and South Africa. This monument is currently located at the Company's Garden in Cape Town. A stone lantern is portable light device used as a source of light or touch like mechanism to illuminate an area of darkness. In traditional Japanese society, lanterns have been very significant in both culture and religion. In 1933, the Japanese government offered to construct a lantern monument in the Company's Garden which was handed to the Government of South Africa as a symbol of appreciation for their benevolence towards Japanese immigrants during World War I.

== Background ==
Relations between South Africa and Japan are believed to have started around the year 1643 when Jan van Riebeeck (the first commander of the Cape) visited Japan to establish trade relations. In 1889 the first Japanese shop was opened on Adderley Street in Cape Town. Long before the First World War broke out in 1919, the two countries were slowly building their trade and diplomatic relations. However, these diplomatic and trade relations only took roots in 1910 when the first Japanese Honorary Consul Julius Otto Jeppe was appointed to South Africa. In 2010 the two countries celebrated 100 years of trade and diplomatic co-operations.

== History ==
The history of Japanese lanterns can be traced to have had its roots from China. As far back as 250 B.C.E. the Chinese used lanterns to celebrate religious and cultural festivals as well a form of decoration for Chinese homes. However, Chinese lanterns originated as a form of communication within the military between soldiers in the battle field. It is believed that "a popular military strategist Zhuge Liang created the first flying lantern in China. This was later incorporated into Buddhism and Hinduism once Chinese Monks began to use lanterns to light temples. A Korean Buddhist monk is said to have transported the use of lanterns to Japan. With the introduction of Buddhism in Japan, the use of lanterns became a part of the common religious practices, and later became very symbolic in the Japanese military and culture. Japanese lanterns were first used in cultural festivals held in honour of departed loved ones. These sculptured lanterns, floating lanterns, hanging lanterns, and hand held lanterns are believed to guide the spirit of the departed ones. The names of the departed loved ones are inscribed on the lanterns. Lanterns are often used during special ceremonies such as marriages, births, and deaths.

The Japanese government in 1932 erected a granite-like stone lantern which was handed to the government of Cape Town in appreciation of their benevolence towards Japanese immigrants in the 1930s. "According to Crump & van Niekerk (1988) this gift was the first of two gifts from the Government of Japan." The gift symbolises a political co-operation between Japan and South Africa about a decade after the end of the First World War. It is not clear who designed and constructed the monument. Though the monument was built to represent a symbol of appreciation to the South African government, it was also intended to fulfil cultural heritages of former soldiers who carried out the lighting of lanterns to appease the spirit of their war victims.

== See also ==
- Japanese lantern

== Sources ==
- Crump, Alan; van Niekerk, Raymund (1988). Public Sculpture & Reliefs—Cape Town. Clifton Publications. ISBN 978-0-620-12464-5.
- Osada, Masako (1959). Sanctions and Honorary Whites: Diplomatic Policies and Economic Realities in between Japan and South Africa. Library of Congress. ISBN 978-0-313-31877-1.
- O'Donoghue, Bridget (2009). "Audit of Sculptures, Memorials and Monuments" (PDF). Cape Town. p. 28. Archived from the original (PDF) on 7 March 2014.
- Siu, Kin Wai Michael (1999). "Lanterns of the Mid-Autumn Festival: A Reflection of Hong Kong Cultural Change". The Journal of Popular Culture. 33 (2): 67–86. doi:10.1111/j.0022-3840.1999.3302_67.x.
- Dwinga, Fiona (16 November 2012). "Japan and South Africa: A chronicle of 100 years of relations". Consultancy Africa Intelligence.
- "History of Japanese – South Africa relations". Gibs.co.za. Archived from the original on 23 January 2014.
