= Daniel Louis Mundy =

New Zealand photographer (1826–1881)

- Born: 1826; Wiltshire England
- Died: 30 November 1881 (aged 54–55); Victoria, Australia
- Occupation: Photographer

Daniel Louis Mundy (1826-1881) was a New Zealand photographer. Not much is known about Mundy's early life in England other than that he married Louisa Rust in Hackney, London in 1856. They arrived in Dunedin, New Zealand in 1864 and purchased William Meluish's photographic business. In 1865 he moved to Christchurch.

In Christchurch, Mundy photographed Moa skeletons under the commission of Julius von Haast for the Canterbury Museum. These photographs were then reprinted for the Illustrated London News. One of these photographs is held in the collection of the New Orleans Museum of Art. In 1867 he was commissioned to photograph a portrait of Governor George Grey.

Mundy was originally a portrait photographer. In 1869, he travelled New Zealand taking views and selling prints of the New Zealand landscape. In 1873, the New Zealand Government used some of these prints for the Vienna Exhibition and in 1875 he published a book called Rotomahana - The Boiling Spring of NZ, with a foreword by Ferdinand von Hochstetter. Also that year, Mundy's only child was born in Port Chalmers.

In 1874, Mundy moved to England to further his career prospects. He gave a talk to the Photographic Society of Great Britain about his experiences of taking pictures around New Zealand. This seminar became the basis of an article which Mundy had published in the British publication Photographic News.

In 1875, Mundy relocated to Australia, where he died in 1881.
