= Statue of George Grey, Cape Town =

Statue of Sir George Grey in Cape Town

Coordinates: 33°55′32″S 18°25′07″E

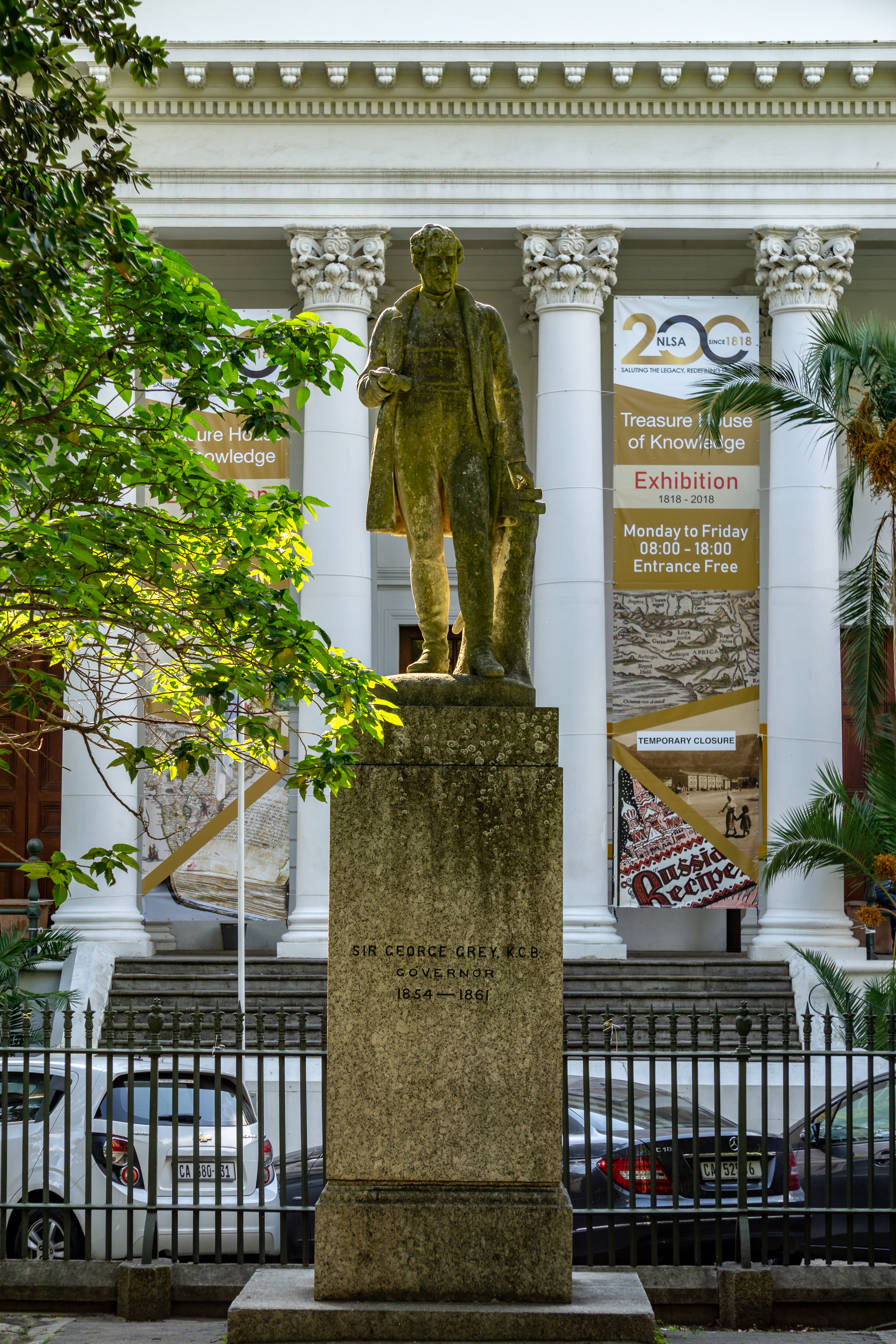
Statue of George Grey

A statue of Sir George Grey stands in Company's Garden, in Cape Town, South Africa, in front of the local campus of the National Library of South Africa. The inscription on it reads "Sir George Grey K.C.B. Governor 1854–1861." Grey left his own personal library, the Grey Collection, to this library. William Calder Marshall from London completed the sculpture in 1863.
