= Statue of George Grey, Auckland =

Statue in Auckland, New Zealand

Sir George Grey Statue
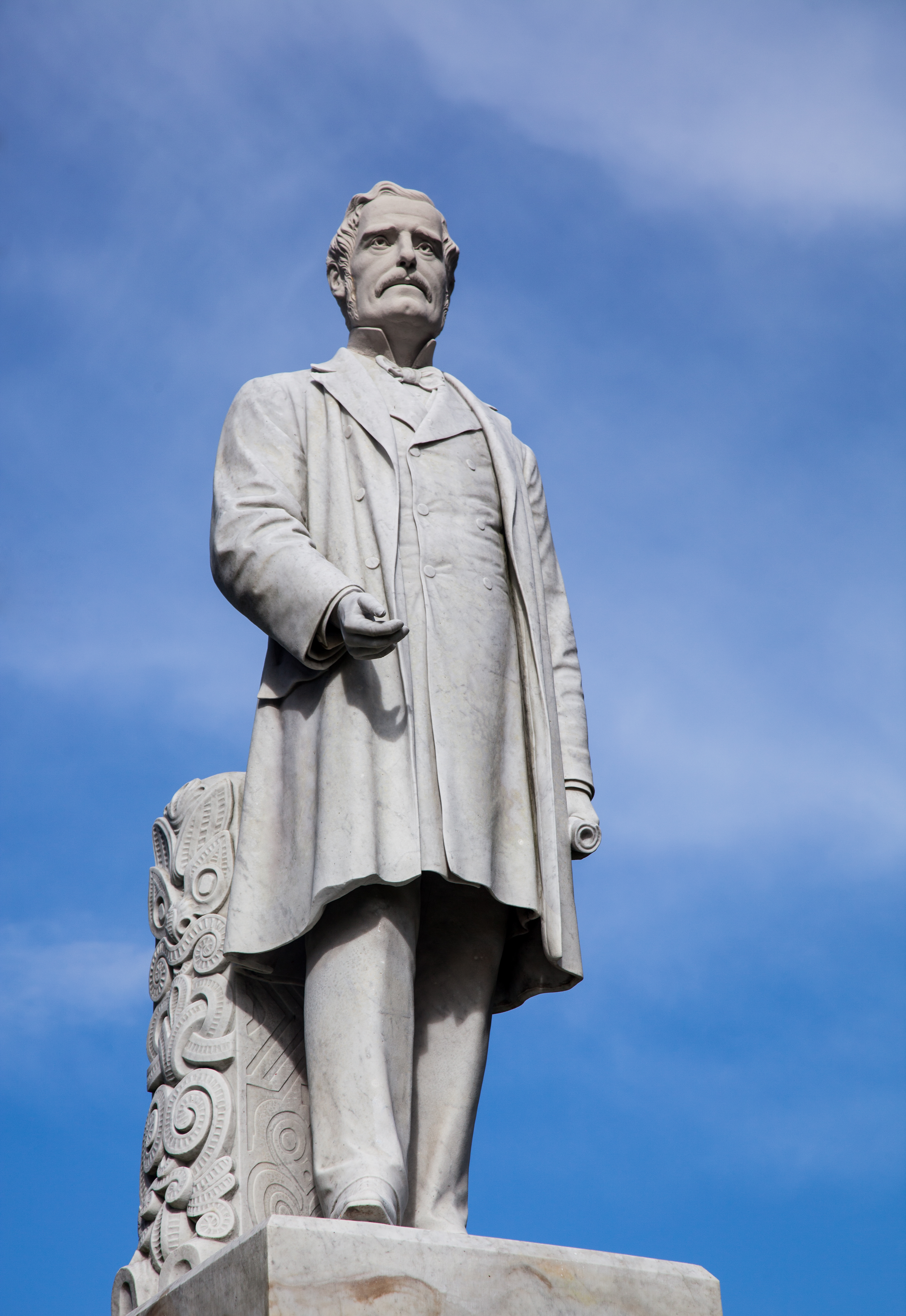
- Sir George Grey statue in 2008
- Interactive map of Sir George Grey Statue
- Location: Albert Park, Auckland, New Zealand
- Coordinates: 36°51′0.32″S 174°46′3.87″E
- Designer: Francis John Williamson
- Material: Marble (statue); Granite (base)
- Completion date: 1904

Heritage New Zealand – Category 1
- Designated: 2 February 1990
- Reference no.: 119

The Sir George Grey Statue in Albert Park, Auckland commemorates George Grey, the third Governor of New Zealand and 11th Premier of New Zealand. The statue, sculpted by Francis John Williamson, was unveiled on 21 December 1904 by the Governor, William Plunket, 5th Baron Plunket.

== Background ==
=== Inception ===
Whilst the career of George Grey was marked by controversy, he later gained recognition as an iconic elder statesman. Proposals to commemorate Grey arose during his lifetime, notably by the Auckland Women's Liberal League in 1895.

George Grey died in 1898. Grey's death was met with a public outpouring of grief, which included closed shops and "a long procession of carnages and vehicles." The New Zealand Herald anticipated that the unveiling of the Grey Statue would serve as a final tribute, reporting:

The unveiling of the Grey Statue may be looked forward to as the closing scene, when Aucklanders will doubtless again turn out en masse, to pay their final tribute of respect to the memory of the greatest statesman who has swayed the destiny of this young colony, irrespective of faction or party.

In 1898, Auckland's Mayor Peter Dignan formed the Sir George Grey Statue Committee, chaired by F.E. Baume, to oversee a memorial. In February 1900, a site at the intersection of Queen Street and Greys Avenue was selected. The design was selected by the committee in September 1900.

=== Creation ===
The funding of the statue was provided by subscriptions and a $1000 subsidy from Parliament. The statue was crafted by Francis John Williamson for a fee of 1200 guineas. Williamson relied on a single photograph from 1868 to construct the statue. Messrs Trayes Bros constructed the pedestal and for a sum of £1825.

== History ==
The statue was unveiled on 21 December 1904 at the intersection of Queen Street and Greys Avenue by the Governor, William Plunket, 5th Baron Plunket. The statue's opening ceremony included chiefs of the Ngāpuhi, Hauraki, Rotorua, Waikato Tainui and Ngāti Whātua iwi. The statue later moved to Albert Park in 1922 because the memorial was considered a hindrance to traffic after tramway lines were built to either side of the statue.

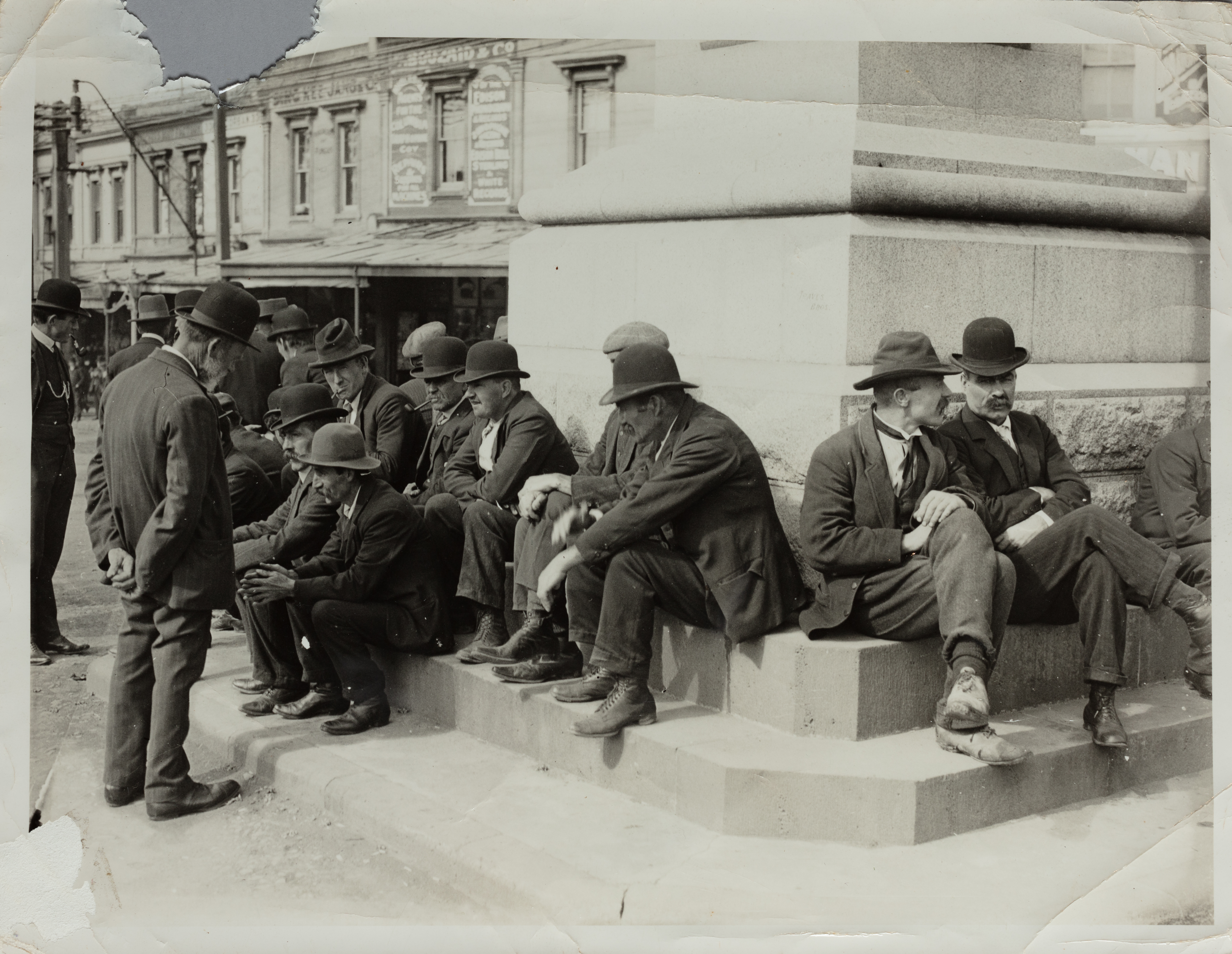
Group of men congregate around base of the Sir George Grey statue when it was situated in Queen Street. Circa 1904–1909.

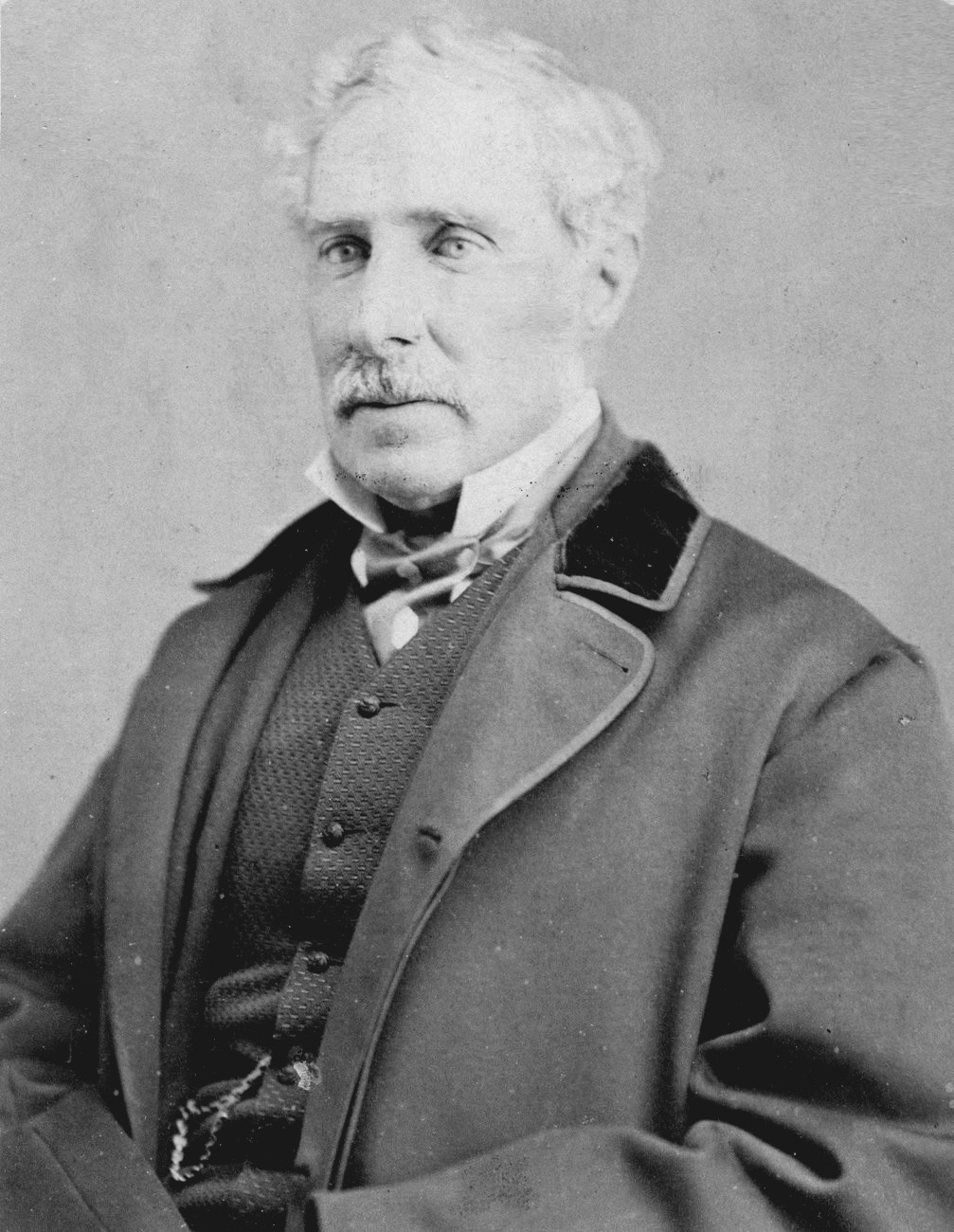
Photo of George Grey used to sculpt the head of the statue.

The statue has frequently been subject to vandals and activists. The head of the statue was broken off on Waitangi Day, 1987, as a protest against Grey. Roderick Burgess was commissioned to execute a replacement marble-coated concrete head. Burgess relied on a photo of Grey in his fifties and a bust of Grey from Mansion House. The new head was attached in March 1988. In 2020, the statue was vandalised and smeared in red paint.

The statue was given a Heritage New Zealand category 1 rating in 1990.

== Composition ==
The statue is crafted from marble, with a base and pedestal made from local stone. The steps are constructed from Tamaki scoria, and the pedestal is formed from Coromandel tonalite. The replacement head is reinforced with a brass rod and filled with cement for added stability.

The statue, as it stands today, was described by the Dunstan Times as:

The "good Governor," standing with his right leg slightly advanced, is in the ordinary frock coat of civilian garb, above which he wears an overcoat thrown open; his right arm is akimbo, his left, stretched at his side, holds a scroll. Behind him is a carved [Māori] post, which gives local colour, and at the same time serves as a support for the figure.

=== Inscriptions ===
There is an inscription on each side of the statue's plinth. James Carroll authored the rear inscription in the Māori language. These inscriptions read as follows:

Front Inscription	Left Inscription
Stabilis Sir George Grey P.C., K.C.B. &c 1812–1898	Governor South Australia 1841–45, " New Zealand 1845–53, " Cape Colony 1854–61, " New Zealand 1861–68, Last Superintendent of Auckland 1875–76, Premier of New Zealand 1877–79.
Rear Inscription	Right Inscription
E tangi e te iwi ki te matua kua ngaro KI A HORI KEREI; Te kai-hautu o te waka Te whakaruru hau o te iwi Māori i nga ra i mua Te toak tu moana i aio Haere ra e Pa. Te putea o nga mahara o nga kupu. Ma muri e mihi o koha ki te ao	SOLDIER, STATESMAN, LOVER OF HIS FELLOWMEN. Whose wisdom eloquence and strong personality gave to the people of this colony a large measure of the liberties they now possess

== Reception ==
The statue was well received at its opening. Premier Richard Seddon described the statue as 'a striking work of monumental art,' whilst the New Zealand Herald admired 'the erect and dignified bearing' of the statue and praised the Māori inscription on the statue. Māori chiefs present at the opening remarked that they were 'pleased with the honourable recognition of Sir George Grey.'

Subsequent evaluations of the statue by Māori have been negative. After the statue's decapitation, Māori academic Ranginui Walker described Grey as the 'hitman of colonisation' who deserved to 'get his head knocked off.' Art historians have criticised the statue for its 'stiffness and staidness', with Michael Dunn criticising the final pose as being "unimaginative in conception".

== Gallery ==
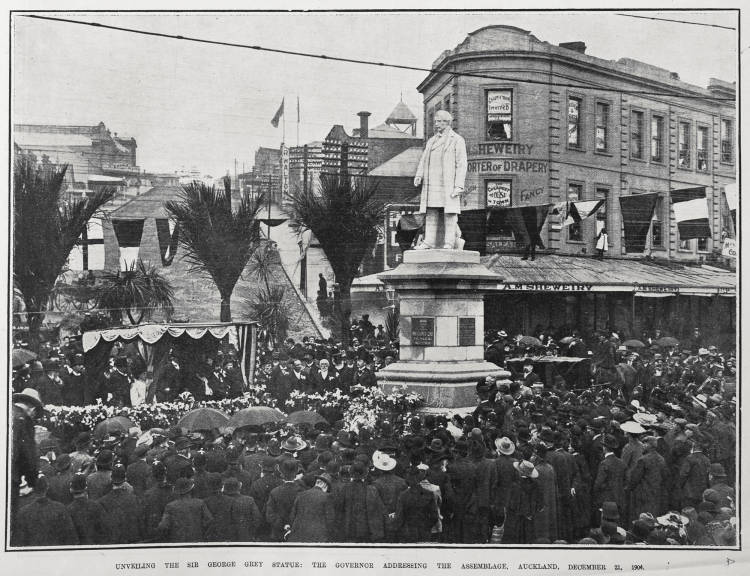
Unveiling the Sir George Grey Statue, 1904

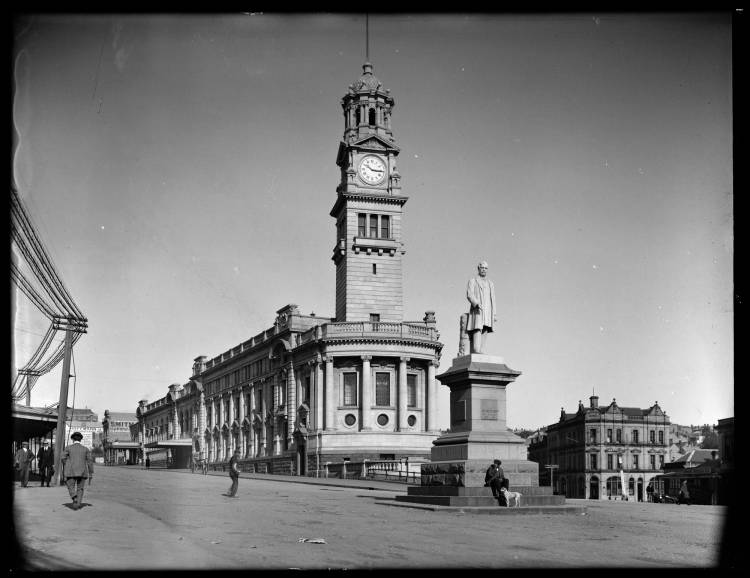
The Statue in 1912

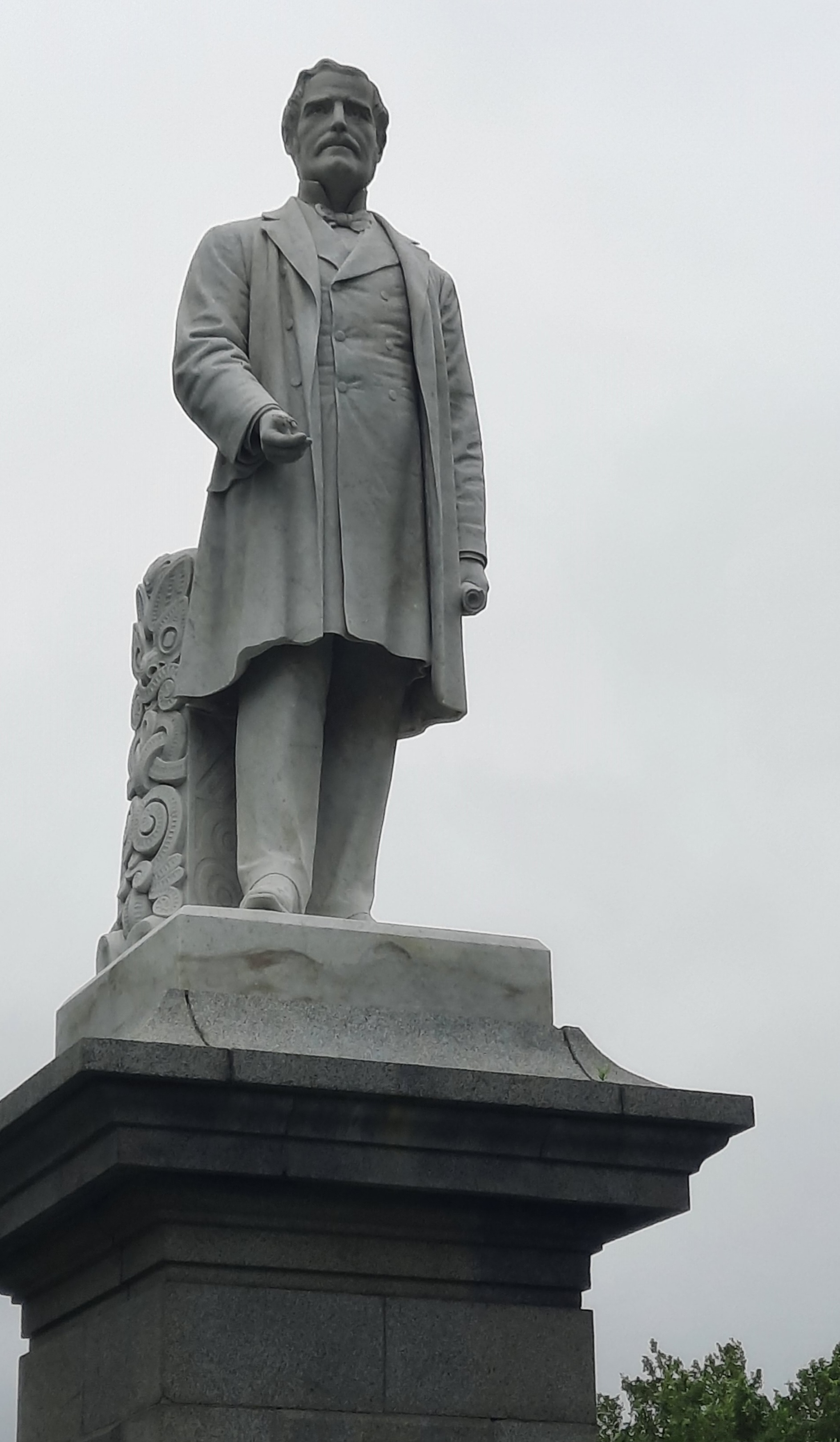
The Statue in 2024

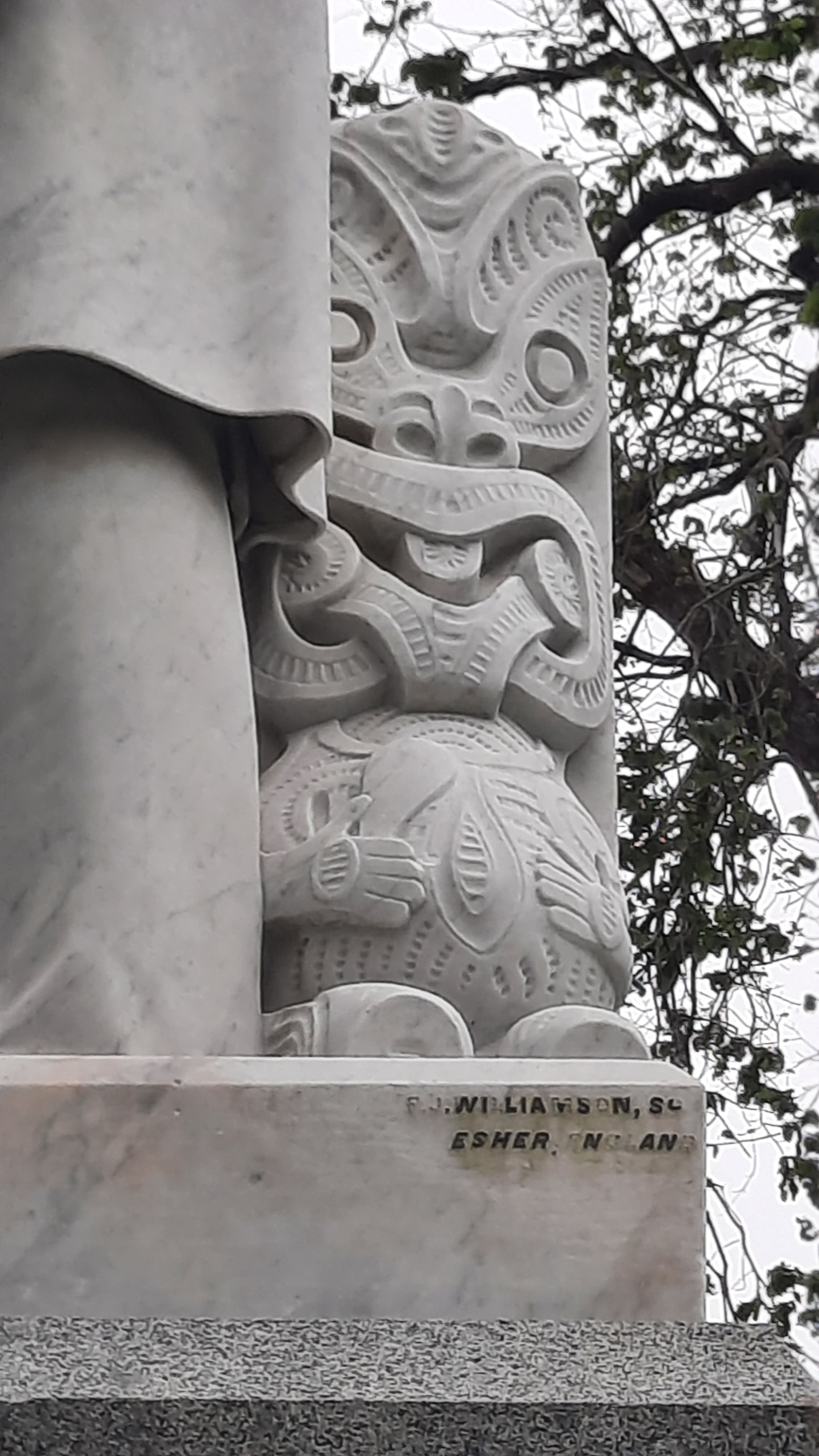
The statue's Māori carving and creator's signature

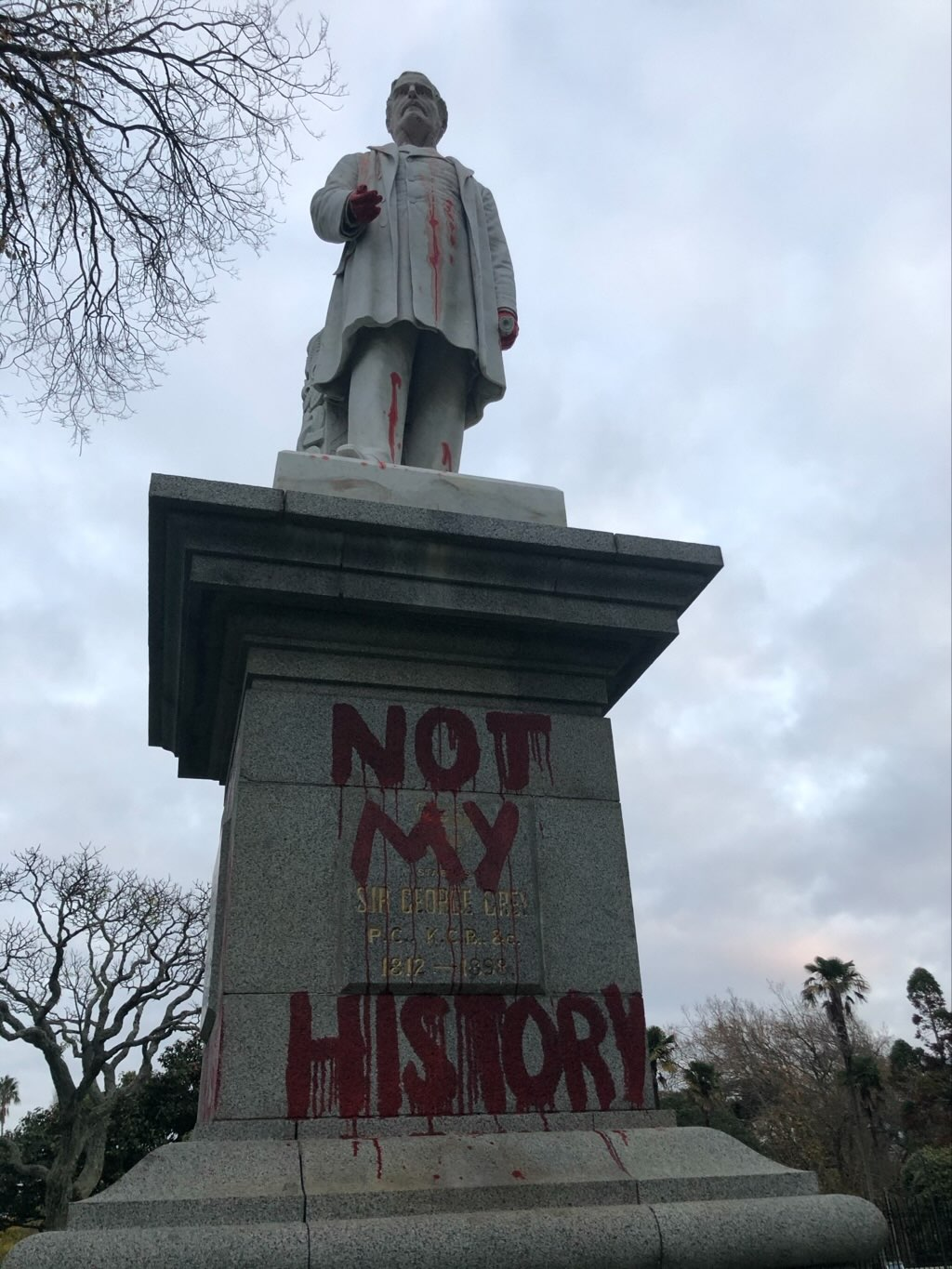
Statue of George Grey vandalised by protestors on 14 June 2020.
