= Statue of Cecil Rhodes, Company's Garden =

Monument in Cape Town, South Africa

Coordinates: 33.92664°S 18.4174°E

Cecil John Rhodes Statue
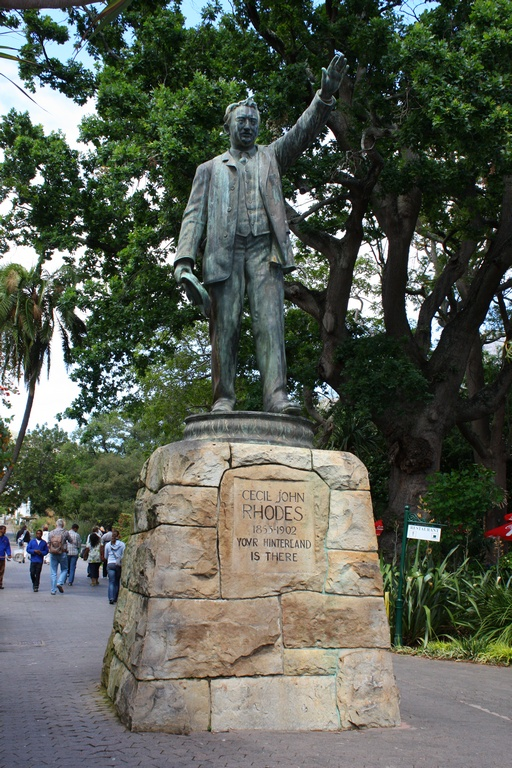
- Cecil John Rhodes statue
- Interactive map of Cecil John Rhodes Statue
- Location: Cape Town, South Africa
- Designer: Sir Herbert Baker
- Material: Granite base and a bronze statue
- Opening date: June 28th, 1910
- Dedicated to: "Cecil John Rhodes; 1855-1902; Your hinterland is there"

The Cecil John Rhodes Statue is a monument erected at Company's Garden in Cape Town. The statue was erected in 1908. It features a full body replica of Cecil Rhodes wearing a three-piece suit, standing with his left hand raised and pointing north. It has been compared to the Jan van Riebeeck statue, which faces south and asserts a different sense of occupation. Despite its size, the present location of the monument in the Company's Garden makes it less significant in comparison to that of Jan Smuts at Adderley Street, Cape Town, a location that had been considered for the placement of the Rhodes statue.

== Location ==
The monument is located in the Company's Garden on a secondary axis of the Iziko South African Museum. The original plan was to use the statue as a visual landmark at the top of Adderley Street; however, Sir Herbert Baker objected to the placement of the statue at the top of Adderley Street because of the scale of the statue. His concern was that the statue could have a dwarfing effect on the cathedral or other monuments in the vicinity. Due to a lack of consensus as to where the statue should be placed by Baker and Francis Masey, the statue was placed in the Company's Garden instead of on Adderley Street.

== Architecture ==
The architectural design is described as an expression of imperialist interest in Southern Africa. It was made of non-orthogonal and roughly hewn sandstone material to symbolise Rhodes' love for the natural environment and his interest in mining, which was the main focus of his industrial interest in South Africa. Some historians and architects argue that the monument is an expression of Rhodes' interest in what was then called Transvaal and the Orange Free State.

== Life ==
Rhodes (5 July 1853 – 26 March 1902) was a British businessman, mining magnate, and politician in South Africa. An ardent believer in British colonialism, Rhodes was the founder of the southern African territory of Rhodesia, which was named after him in 1895. South Africa's Rhodes University is also named after Rhodes. He set up the provisions of the Rhodes Scholarship, which is funded by his estate.

== See also ==
- Rhodes Memorial
