= 1956 Auckland City mayoral election =

New Zealand mayoral election

← 1953	17 November 1956	1957 →
- Turnout: 33,795 (42.97%)
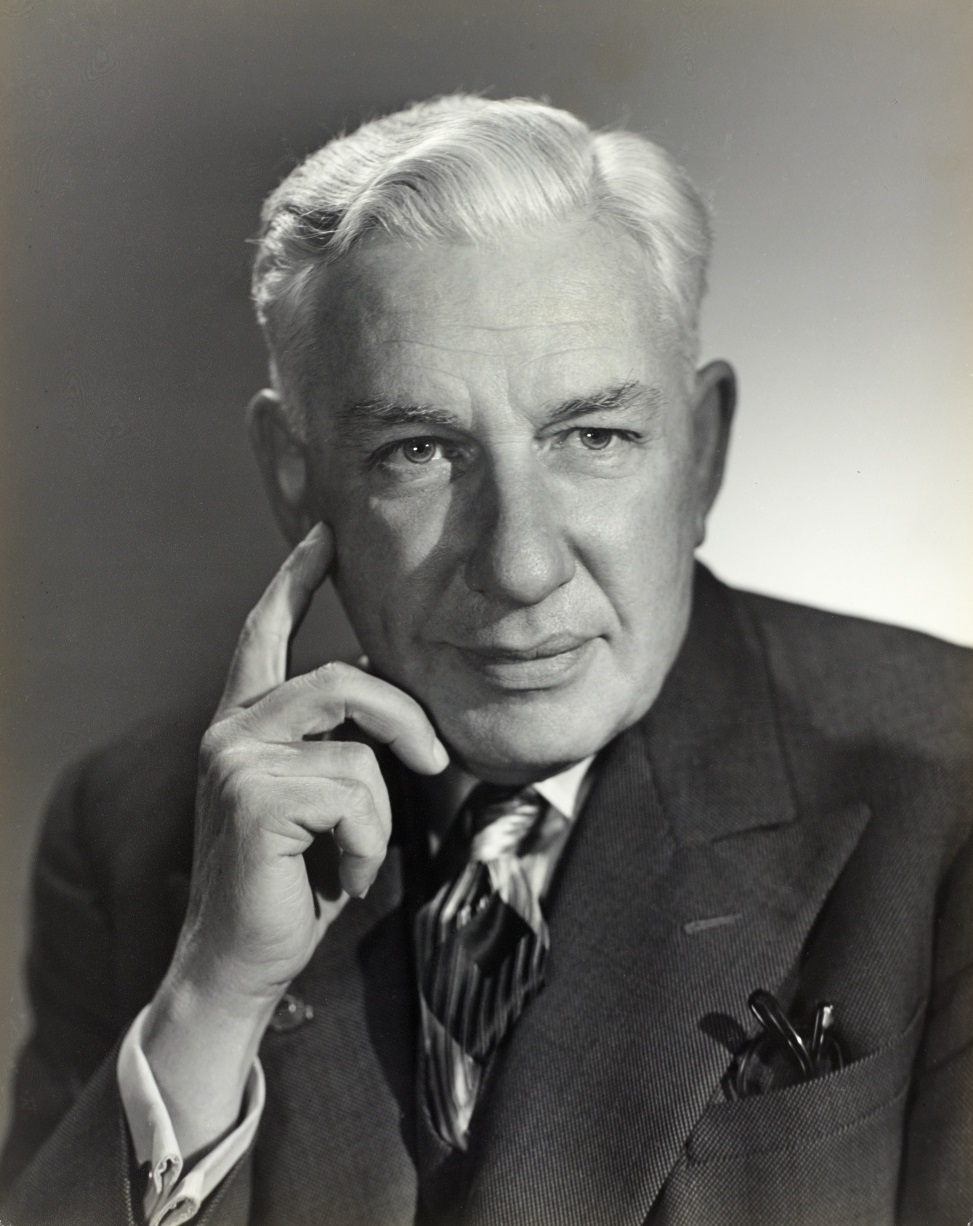

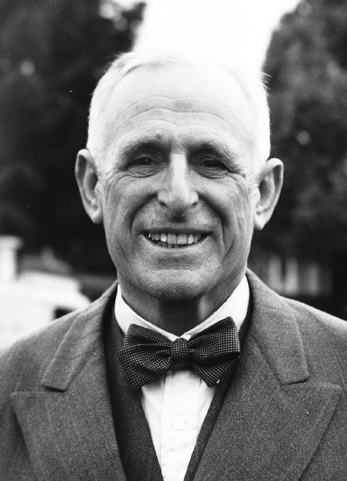

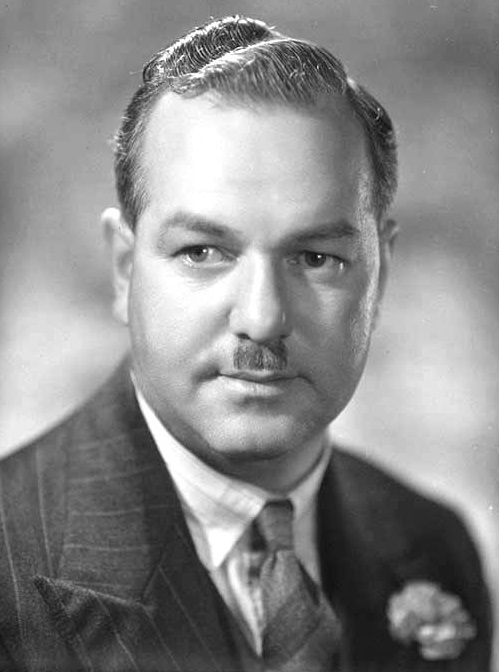
Candidate	Tom Ashby	John Luxford	John Stewart
Party	Independent	Citizens & Ratepayers	Labour
Popular vote	12,017	11,274	10,333
Percentage	35.55	33.35	30.57
Mayor before election
John Luxford
Elected mayor
Tom Ashby

The 1956 Auckland City mayoral election was part of the New Zealand local elections held that same year. In 1956, elections were held for the Mayor of Auckland plus other local government positions including twenty-one city councillors. The polling was conducted using the standard first-past-the-post electoral method.

== Background ==
Mayor John Luxford was challenged over his claim of wasteful expenditure by the Council by former Town Clerk Tom Ashby who claimed Luxford had not remedied the problem with the programmes he had initiated. Ashby was endorsed by the United Independents electoral ticket after Luxford had joined the Citizens & Ratepayers ticket after a falling out with Robinson and his United Independent colleagues who had backed him in his 1953 campaign. The United Independents vote fell, losing their balance of power, with the Citizens & Ratepayers regaining their council majority once again.

== Mayoralty results ==
1956 Auckland mayoral election
Party	Candidate	Votes	%	±%
Independent	Tom Ashby	12,017	35.55	
Citizens & Ratepayers	John Luxford	11,274	33.35	−17.71
Labour	John Stewart	10,333	30.57	
Informal votes		171	0.50	−1.33
Majority		743	2.19	
Turnout		33,795	42.97	

== Councillor results ==
1956 Auckland City Council election
Party	Candidate	Votes	%	±%
Labour	Mary Dreaver	14,546	43.04	+3.71
Citizens & Ratepayers	Keith Buttle	14,095	41.70	+5.62
Citizens & Ratepayers	Fred Ambler	13,130	38.85	−3.76
Citizens & Ratepayers	Winifred Delugar	12,885	38.12	
Citizens & Ratepayers	Tom Bloodworth	12,790	37.84	+4.34
Labour	James Neil Bradley	12,720	37.63	+7.14
Labour	Alex Dreaver	12,453	36.84	+5.64
Citizens & Ratepayers	John Whittaker	12,414	36.73	+2.57
Citizens & Ratepayers	Reg Savory	12,083	35.75	−2.27
Citizens & Ratepayers	Albert Edward Bailey	12,005	35.52	
Citizens & Ratepayers	Howard Hunter	11,868	35.11	+4.54
Labour	George Forsyth	11,631	34.41	+3.24
United Independents	Dove-Myer Robinson	11,553	34.18	−6.30
Citizens & Ratepayers	John Carpenter	11,489	33.99	
United Independents	Eric Armishaw	11,475	33.95	+0.05
Citizens & Ratepayers	Brian Kingston	11,274	33.35	
United Independents	Ken Cumberland	11,183	33.09	+1.01
Citizens & Ratepayers	Max Tongue	11,178	33.07	
Labour	Pat Curran	10,924	32.32	−0.47
Labour	Clarence George Beer	10,830	32.04	
Citizens & Ratepayers	Fred Glasse	10,662	31.54	
Citizens & Ratepayers	Geoffrey Myers (Note: Myers was appointed to the council in December 1956 to replace Clarence George Beer after a recount.)	10,557	31.23	+7.35
Labour	Ronald Akersten	10,544	31.19	+1.57
Labour	William Grant-Mackie	10,516	31.11	
Labour	Isabella Stancliff	10,504	31.08	
Citizens & Ratepayers	John Dale	10,487	31.03	
Labour	Agnes Johnston	10,274	30.40	−6.24
Citizens & Ratepayers	Mel Tronson	10,194	30.16	
Citizens & Ratepayers	Edward Henderson	10,127	29.96	
United Independents	Val Chapman	9,979	29.52	
Labour	Arthur Clark	9,975	29.51	
Citizens & Ratepayers	Thomas Bennett	9,973	29.49	
Labour	Frederick Johnston	9,941	29.41	+2.11
Citizens & Ratepayers	Frederick Merritt	9,900	29.29	
Labour	Dudley Ashford	9,896	29.28	
United Independents	Joseph Moodabe	9,873	29.21	
Labour	Alexander Meldrum	9,859	29.17	
Labour	Alexander Grant	9,824	29.06	−0.93
Labour	Edith Williams	9,700	28.70	+0.82
Labour	Mary Phillips	9,663	28.59	
Labour	James Booth	9,649	28.55	
Labour	Charles Apps	9,477	28.04	
Labour	Norman Finch	9,222	27.28	−0.41
Labour	Cyril William Avenell	8,841	26.16	
Citizens & Ratepayers	Gideon Rodger	8,797	26.03	+3.51
Citizens & Ratepayers	William Tailby	8,694	25.72	
United Independents	Eric Boggs	8,652	25.60	
Citizens & Ratepayers	Walter Reevely	8,308	24.58	
United Independents	Matt Te Hau	8,013	23.71	
United Independents	Harold Watts	7,962	23.55	
United Independents	Vernon Brown	7,808	23.10	−5.79
United Independents	Robert Wright	7,545	22.32	
United Independents	Mary Jackson	7,265	21.49	−6.15
United Independents	Charles Fisher	7,241	21.42	
United Independents	John Northey	7,122	21.07	
United Independents	Berin Spiro	6,903	20.42	
United Independents	Wallace Fountain	6,885	20.37	
United Independents	Alister Martin	6,387	18.89	
United Independents	Lionel Albert	6,345	18.77	
Citizens & Ratepayers	Laurie Gluckman	6,309	18.66	
United Independents	David Wilkie	6,170	18.25	
United Independents	Glassford Glover Walter Gray	6,095	18.03	
United Independents	Charles Collier	5,764	17.05	
Independent	Richard Armstrong	2,222	6.57	−3.71
Independent	George Mullenger	1,927	5.70	−0.46
Communist	Rita Smith	1,803	5.33	+0.95
Communist	Bill Andersen	1,698	5.02	+0.18
Communist	Donald McEwan	1,593	4.71	+0.41
Independent	Frank Dunn	1,531	4.53	

Table footnotes:
