= 1950 Auckland City mayoral election =

New Zealand mayoral election

← 1947	18 November 1950	1953 →
- Turnout: 40,290 (42.28%)
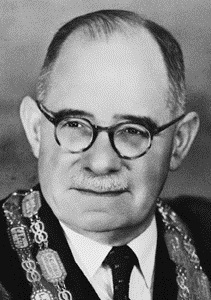

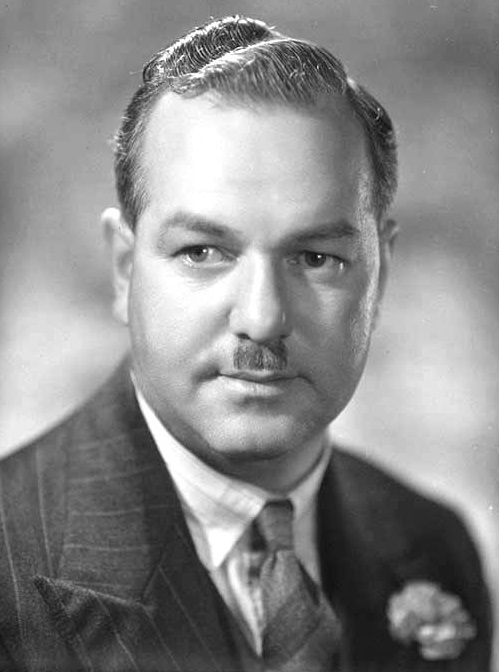

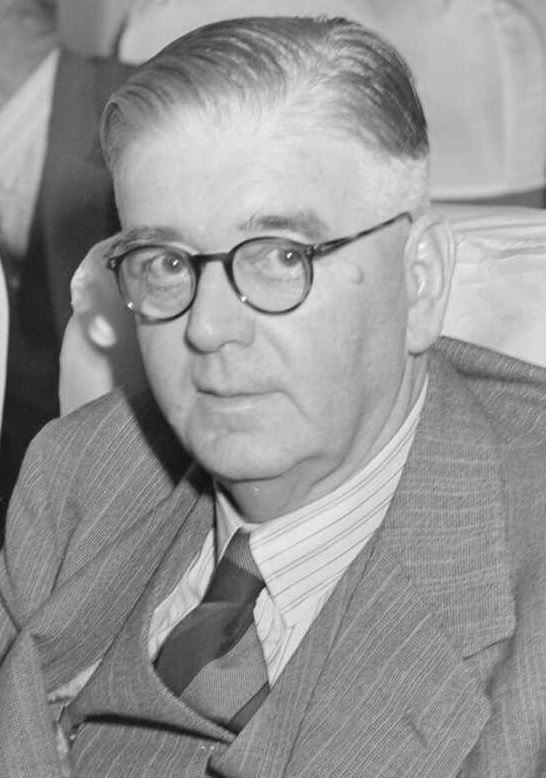
Candidate	Sir John Allum	John Stewart	Leonard Coakley
Party	Independent	Labour	Citizens & Ratepayers
Popular vote	20,021	13,084	6,481
Percentage	49.69	32.47	16.08
Mayor before election
Sir John Allum
Elected mayor
Sir John Allum

The 1950 Auckland City mayoral election was part of the New Zealand local elections held that same year. In 1950, elections were held for the Mayor of Auckland plus other local government positions including twenty-one city councillors. The polling was conducted using the standard first-past-the-post electoral method.

== Background ==
Citizens & Ratepayers
The Citizens & Ratepayers Association decided not to re-select incumbent mayor John Allum to contest the mayoralty for another term. At a meeting on 30 August the association instead 'after careful consideration' selected the deputy mayor John Leonard Coakley. At the time of selection Coakley was overseas and his intention to accept nomination could not be confirmed until 8 October when he returned to Auckland after a six-month excursion and stated he would accept the invitation to stand. In the meantime, undeterred at his de-selection, Allum announced he had decided to stand for re-election as an independent candidate.

Labour
The Labour Party had three people nominated for the mayoralty:

- Paul Richardson, president of the Tramway Workers' Union and city council candidate at the previous three elections
- Bill Schramm, former MP for Auckland East (1931–46) and Labour's mayoral candidate in 1947
- John Stewart, former city councillor (1935–38) and Labour candidate for Marsden in 1946

At the candidate selection meeting Stewart was selected as Labour's mayoral candidate.

== Mayoralty results ==
1950 Auckland mayoral election
Party	Candidate	Votes	%	±%
Independent	Sir John Allum	20,021	49.69	−5.90
Labour	John Stewart	13,084	32.47	
Citizens & Ratepayers	Leonard Coakley	6,481	16.08	
Communist	Vic Wilcox	541	1.34	
Informal votes		163	0.40	−0.31
Majority		6,937	17.21	−3.36
Turnout		40,290	42.28	

== Councillor results ==
1950 Auckland City Council election
Party	Candidate	Votes	%	±%
Citizens & Ratepayers	Joan Rattray	20,451	53.41	+1.72
Citizens & Ratepayers	Barbara Roche	20,045	52.35	+2.30
Citizens & Ratepayers	Fred Ambler	18,962	49.52	−6.73
Citizens & Ratepayers	Arthur Bailey	17,984	46.96	−6.06
Citizens & Ratepayers	Roy McElroy	16,334	42.65	−8.61
Citizens & Ratepayers	William Mackay	15,978	41.72	−7.58
Citizens & Ratepayers	Keith Buttle	15,880	41.47	−7.16
Citizens & Ratepayers	Max Tongue	15,499	40.47	−8.81
Labour	Bill Butler	15,451	40.35	−3.67
Citizens & Ratepayers	Reginald Stanley Harrop	15,441	40.32	−8.65
Citizens & Ratepayers	Frederick George Lintott	15,093	39.41	−10.55
Citizens & Ratepayers	Mary Wright	14,973	39.10	−11.92
Citizens & Ratepayers	Thomas Allan Bennett	14,834	38.74	
Citizens & Ratepayers	Howard Hunter	14,706	38.40	
Labour	Charles Victor Austin	14,671	38.31	
Citizens & Ratepayers	Horace Kirk	14,169	37.00	−10.27
Citizens & Ratepayers	John Whittaker	14,135	36.91	
Citizens & Ratepayers	Joyce William Hyland	14,053	36.70	−12.22
Citizens & Ratepayers	Harold Barry	13,960	36.45	
Citizens & Ratepayers	Robert Hector MacKay	13,835	36.13	
Labour	Agnes Dodd	13,747	35.90	
Citizens & Ratepayers	Bob Beechey (Note: Beechey was appointed in March 1953 to fill a vacancy on the council)	13,600	35.51	
Labour	Norman King	13,509	35.28	
Labour	Harold Callagher	13,500	35.25	−4.54
Labour	Denis Brophy	13,447	35.11	
Labour	William Duncan	13,434	35.08	−4.22
Labour	Margaret Warren	13,366	34.90	
Citizens & Ratepayers	Aubrey Tronson	13,343	34.84	
Labour	George G. Grant	13,323	34.79	
Labour	Paul Richardson	13,233	34.55	−5.37
Labour	Alan Robert Tanner	13,179	34.41	
Labour	Richard Wrathall	13,082	34.16	−3.13
Citizens & Ratepayers	Joseph Devine Dimond	13,023	34.01	
Labour	Martin Charles Conroy	12,991	33.92	
Labour	John Henry Weaver	12,609	32.93	
Labour	Frank Williams	12,187	31.82	
Labour	Reginald J. Katterns	12,013	31.37	
Labour	Laurence Daniel Murphy	11,987	31.30	
Labour	Ivor G. Paddison	11,490	30.00	
Labour	Cyril H. Penwill	11,478	29.97	
Independent	Howard Edward Gray Matthews	11,424	29.83	−17.21
Labour	Arthur William Punchard	11,320	29.56	
Labour	Ivan John Milicich	11,173	29.17	
Independent	Albert Charles Marks	7,671	20.03	
Independent	Richard Armstrong	5,210	13.60	
Independent	George Mullenger	4,847	12.65	
Independent	Amy Milburn	3,231	8.43	+2.76
Communist	George Jackson	2,799	7.31	−0.21
Communist	Ben Bray	2,789	7.28	
Communist	Donald McEwan	2,627	6.86	
Communist	Alexander Drennan	2,620	6.84	
Communist	Rita Smith	2,531	6.61	
Communist	Ronald Charles Black	2,526	6.59	
Communist	Johnny Mitchell	2,465	6.43	
Communist	Bruce Skilton	1,565	4.08	
Communist	Peter McAra	1,557	4.06	
Communist	Frederick Daniel Muller	1,542	4.02	
Communist	Alec Rait	1,279	3.34	
Communist	Tom Spiller	1,412	3.68	

Table footnotes:
