= 1953 Auckland City mayoral election =

New Zealand mayoral election

- 31 October 1953
- Turnout: 39,561
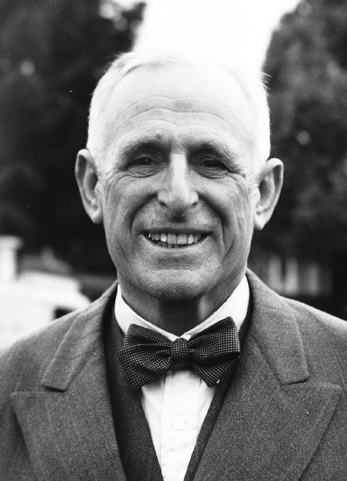

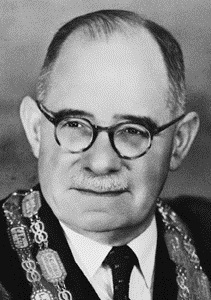
Candidate	John Luxford	John Allum
Party	Independent	Independent
Popular vote	20,201	18,633
Percentage	51.06	47.09
Mayor before election
John Allum
Elected mayor
John Luxford

The 1953 Auckland City mayoral election was part of the New Zealand local elections held that same year. In 1953, elections were held for the Mayor of Auckland plus other local government positions including twenty-one city councillors. The polling was conducted using the standard first-past-the-post electoral method.

== Background ==
Long serving incumbent mayor John Allum was successfully challenged by former magistrate John Luxford. Allum was the first mayor in the 20th century who had stood for re-election unsuccessfully. Luxford was endorsed by the new United Independents electoral ticket who gained the balance of power between the Labour Party and Citizens & Ratepayers, costing the latter the majority they had held since 1938.

The Labour Party initially intended to stand a candidate and it was seen that MP for Arch Hill and former councillor John Stewart would stand. Stewart was selected as Labour's nominee but later withdrew his candidacy prompting the party to re-open nominations. Labour selected a replacement candidate, Richard Newell Stephen Joseph Wrathall, to replace Stewart. Wrathall, who was Labour's candidate for North Shore at the 1951 election, was vice-president of the Auckland Labour Representation Committee and a candidate for the city council in 1947, 1950 and a 1952 by-election. He was an engineering clerk and both an executive member of the Auckland Trades Council and Clerical Workers' Union. Just over a month before the election, Wrathall was removed as a candidate after he was suspended as a member of the party. The party subsequently did not select a replacement mayoral candidate.

A major talking point in the lead up to the election was the potential of a clash with the 1953 Royal Tour. There were proposals to postpone local elections until early 1954 over fears of reduced turnout due to a conflicted schedule. The proposals were considered by the Minister of Internal Affairs William Bodkin, who ultimately decided against it.

== Mayoralty results ==
1953 Auckland mayoral election
Party	Candidate	Votes	%	±%
Independent	John Luxford	20,201	51.06	
Independent	John Allum	18,633	47.09	−2.60
Informal votes		727	1.83	+1.43
Majority		1,568	3.96	
Turnout		39,561		

== Councillor results ==
1953 Auckland local election
Party	Candidate	Votes	%	±%
Citizens & Ratepayers	Fred Ambler	15,972	42.61	−6.91
Citizens & Ratepayers	Barbara Roche	15,329	40.89	11.46
United Independents	Dove-Myer Robinson	15,175	40.48	
Labour	Mary Dreaver	14,744	39.33	
Labour	Bill Butler	14,682	39.16	−1.19
Citizens & Ratepayers	Andrew Percy Postlewaite	14,403	38.42	
United Independents	Bruce Barnett	14,270	38.07	
Labour	Agnes Dodd	13,735	36.64	+0.74
Citizens & Ratepayers	Keith Buttle	13,524	36.08	−5.39
Citizens & Ratepayers	John Whittaker	12,805	34.16	−2.75
United Independents	Eric Armishaw	12,710	33.90	
Citizens & Ratepayers	Tom Bloodworth	12,557	33.50	
Citizens & Ratepayers	Reg Savory	12,553	33.48	
Labour	Pat Curran	12,291	32.79	
Citizens & Ratepayers	Charles Bailey	12,091	32.25	
United Independents	Ken Cumberland	12,027	32.08	
Labour	Alex Dreaver	11,696	31.20	
Labour	George Forsyth	11,685	31.17	
United Independents	Vern Dyson	11,661	31.11	
Citizens & Ratepayers	Howard Hunter	11,459	30.57	−7.83
Labour	James Neil Bradley	11,431	30.49	
Citizens & Ratepayers	Edna Mackay	11,321	30.20	
Labour	Ronald Akersten	11,103	29.62	
Labour	Paul Richardson	11,096	29.60	−4.95
Citizens & Ratepayers	John Upton	10,976	29.28	
United Independents	Vernon Brown	10,832	28.89	
Labour	John Albert Mason	10,807	28.83	
United Independents	Maxwell Francis Constable	10,804	28.82	
Labour	Alexander Grant	10,545	28.13	
Labour	Edith Williams	10,452	27.88	
Labour	Norman Finch	10,380	27.69	
United Independents	Mary Jackson	10,364	27.64	
Labour	Cyril Keeling	10,237	27.31	
Labour	Frederick Johnston	10,236	27.30	
Citizens & Ratepayers	Howard Moncrieff Bagnall	10,181	27.16	
Labour	John Henry Weaver	10,170	27.13	−5.80
Citizens & Ratepayers	Geoffrey Richard Keenan	10,165	27.11	
Citizens & Ratepayers	Robert Clive Haszard	10,138	27.04	
Citizens & Ratepayers	Harold Barry	10,091	26.92	−9.53
United Independents	Catherine King	10,012	26.71	
Labour	John Arthur Roebuck	10,012	26.71	
Citizens & Ratepayers	Bob Beechy	9,930	26.49	−9.02
United Independents	Aubrey Tronson	9,868	26.32	−8.52
Labour	Walter Ernest Watson	9,810	26.17	
Labour	William Thomas Elsdon	9,672	25.80	
United Independents	Trenthsm Charles Webster	9,485	25.30	
Citizens & Ratepayers	James Stewart Matthews	9,457	25.23	
Labour	Arthur William Punchard	9,410	25.10	−4.46
United Independents	Robert Dunsmuir	9,344	24.92	
United Independents	Thomas James Sprott	9,187	24.50	
Citizens & Ratepayers	Ralph Howard Exton	9,127	24.34	
Independent	Geoffrey Myers	8,954	23.88	
Citizens & Ratepayers	Gavin Lishman	8,905	23.75	
United Independents	Alfred Edward Knight	8,720	23.26	
Citizens & Ratepayers	Ian Norman Watkin	8,701	23.21	
United Independents	Gideon Rodger	8,442	22.52	
Labour	Norman King	8,384	22.36	−12.92
United Independents	William Murray Wilson	8,285	22.10	
United Independents	George Edward Wilding	8,037	21.44	
United Independents	Stanley Edward Burke	7,893	21.05	
United Independents	Annabel Kathleen Etherington	7,581	20.22	
United Independents	Scott Walton	7,420	19.79	
United Independents	Murray Lennan	7,248	19.33	
Independent	Mary Wright	6,327	16.87	−22.23
Independent	Caroline Margaret Bennett	5,065	13.51	
Independent	Richard Armstrong	3,855	10.28	−3.32
Independent	James MacLean	2,599	6.93	
Independent	George Mullenger	2,312	6.16	−6.49
Communist	Alexander Drennan	1,975	5.26	−1.58
Independent	Colin Campbell Biernacki	1,883	5.02	
Independent	Amy Milburn	1,874	4.99	−3.44
Communist	Bill Andersen	1,817	4.84	
Communist	Rita Smith	1,644	4.38	−2.23
Communist	Donald McEwan	1,612	4.30	−2.56
Communist	August Smith	1,050	2.80	
Communist	Alec Rait	846	2.25	−1.09
