= 1962 Auckland City mayoral election =

New Zealand mayoral election

← 1959	13 October 1962	1965 →
- Turnout: 37,370
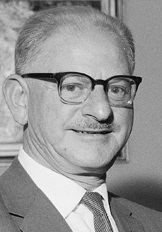

Candidate	Dove-Myer Robinson	Edgar Faber
Party	Independent	Citizens & Ratepayers
Popular vote	19,121	18,249
Percentage	51.17	48.83
Mayor before election
Dove-Myer Robinson
Elected mayor
Dove-Myer Robinson

The 1962 Auckland City mayoral election was part of the New Zealand local elections held that same year. In 1962, elections were held for the Mayor of Auckland plus other local government positions including twenty-one city councillors. The polling was conducted using the standard first-past-the-post electoral method.

== Background ==
Incumbent Mayor Dove-Myer Robinson was re-elected against past president of the Auckland Chamber of Commerce Edgar Faber, who despite possessing a low public profile and comparative lack of local body experience did better than expected. The election also saw the Labour Party split from the Civic Reform ticket. To assist in publicity it was thought that the Labour ticket should include a mayoral candidate as well. The MP for Onehunga (and former Minister of Works from 1957 to 1960) Hugh Watt was speculated as Labour's likely candidate. However, Watt ruled himself out stating he felt he could make a greater contribution to the city's development by remaining in national politics and that he wished to do so by serving in the cabinet of the next Labour government.

Faber was a reluctant candidate from the beginning, who was only persuaded to run for the mayoralty after a group of Citizens & Ratepayers (C&R) councillors (Fred de Malmanche, Charlie Passmore and Reg Savory) told him exaggerated stories of Robinson's personal conduct and his behaviour during council business. During the campaign Faber began to regret his candidacy and when it began to adversely affect his health he planned to withdraw from the contest, but the C&R trio were insistent that he stay in the race. Shortly after the election ended Faber discovered that he was in fact dying of cancer and confided to Robinson that the C&R councillors had used him against Robinson for "purely mercenary ends".

== Mayoralty results ==
1962 Auckland mayoral election
Party	Candidate	Votes	%	±%
Independent	Dove-Myer Robinson	19,121	51.17	+0.10
Citizens & Ratepayers	Edgar Faber	18,249	48.83	
Majority		872	2.33	−0.46
Turnout		37,370		

== Councillor results ==
1962 Auckland City Council election
Party	Candidate	Votes	%	±%
Citizens & Ratepayers	Tom Bloodworth	19,672	52.64	+3.56
Citizens & Ratepayers	Max Tongue	19,449	52.04	+4.36
Citizens & Ratepayers	Winifred Delugar	19,163	51.27	+3.27
Citizens & Ratepayers	Sir Keith Park	18,046	48.29	
Citizens & Ratepayers	Harold Watts	17,478	46.77	+5.22
Citizens & Ratepayers	John Dale	17,266	46.20	+1.98
Citizens & Ratepayers	Winifred Horton	17,082	45.71	
Independent	Fred Ambler	16,763	44.85	−1.79
Citizens & Ratepayers	Fred Glasse	16,408	43.90	−0.64
Citizens & Ratepayers	Fred de Malmanche	16,405	43.89	+2.73
Civic Reform	Eric Armishaw	16,291	43.59	−9.58
Citizens & Ratepayers	Bob Beechey	15,966	42.72	−1.67
Citizens & Ratepayers	George Russell Tutt	15,542	41.58	−0.27
Labour	Alex Dreaver	15,493	41.45	−3.17
Citizens & Ratepayers	Albert Edward Bailey	15,171	40.59	
Citizens & Ratepayers	Norman Speer	14,886	39.83	−0.33
Citizens & Ratepayers	Charlie Passmore	14,663	39.23	−2.85
Civic Reform	Arapeta Awatere	14,591	39.04	
Citizens & Ratepayers	Tom Pearce	13,745	36.78	
Labour	George Forsyth	13,590	36.37	−7.11
Civic Reform	Alfred Shone	13,583	36.34	−14.68
Civic Reform	Val Chapman	13,411	35.88	
Citizens & Ratepayers	Clifton Trevor Keegan	13,098	35.04	
Citizens & Ratepayers	Frederick Grant	12,873	34.44	
Civic Reform	William Grant-Mackie	12,423	33.24	
Citizens & Ratepayers	Basil Roy Arnott	12,347	33.03	
Citizens & Ratepayers	Robert Alfred Heaney	11,508	30.79	
Civic Reform	Bruce Barnett	10,340	27.66	
Citizens & Ratepayers	Bernard William Keam	9,992	26.73	
Labour	Annie Elizabeth Beresford	9,751	26.09	
Citizens & Ratepayers	Laurence Andersen	9,527	25.49	
Civic Reform	Frank Perkins	9,414	25.19	
Labour	Howard Jeffereys	9,397	25.14	−8.70
Civic Reform	Charles Belton	9,100	24.35	−13.01
Labour	Bill Mason	8,432	22.56	
Independent	Sidney Edward Langstone	8,405	22.49	
Labour	Henry Robinson	8,390	22.45	
Labour	Frederick Johnston	8,090	21.64	−13.58
Civic Reform	Evelyn Maud Harrison	8,074	21.60	
Labour	Isabella Stancliff	7,897	21.13	−12.56
Labour	Anita Rona Von Zalinski	7,583	20.29	
Labour	Irene Margaret Offen	7,520	20.12	−13.21
Independent	Graham Caldwell	7,295	19.52	
Communist	Bill Andersen	7,232	19.35	+10.05
Labour	Dave Isbey	7,173	19.20	−11.05
Labour	Thomas Price	7,167	19.17	
Civic Reform	Glassford Glover Walter Gray	7,110	19.02	−17.42
Labour	Robert Elsender	6,915	18.50	−13.54
Civic Reform	Lewis Rose	5,968	15.97	
Communist	George Jackson	3,359	8.98	−0.12
Independent	Jennie Bickler	3,155	8.44	
Communist	Donald McEwan	3,057	8.18	+0.41
Communist	Rita Smith	2,997	8.01	
Communist	Dick Wolf	2,791	7.46	−1.71
Communist	Alec Ostler	2,089	5.59	
Communist	Peter McAra	1,780	4.76	−0.61
