= 1947 Auckland City mayoral election =

New Zealand mayoral election

← 1944	19 November 1947	1950 →
- Turnout: 46,710
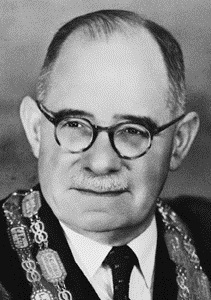

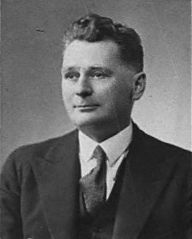
Candidate	John Allum	Bill Schramm
Party	Citizens & Ratepayers	Labour
Popular vote	25,968	19,498
Percentage	55.59	41.74
Mayor before election
John Allum
Elected mayor
John Allum

The 1947 Auckland City mayoral election was part of the New Zealand local elections held that same year. In 1947, elections were held for the Mayor of Auckland plus other local government positions including twenty-one city councillors. The polling was conducted using the standard first-past-the-post electoral method.

== Background ==
Citizens & Ratepayers

The incumbent mayor, John Allum, stood for re-election for a third term.

Labour

The Labour Party had three people nominated for the mayoralty:

- Paul Richardson, a member of the Auckland Transport Board and president of the Point Chevalier branch of the Labour Party
- Bill Schramm, former MP for Auckland East (1931-46)
- John Stewart, former city councillor (1935-38) and Labour candidate for Marsden in 1946

At the candidate selection meeting Schramm was selected as Labour's mayoral candidate alongside a full ticket of 21 candidates for the Auckland City Council.

== Mayoralty results ==
1947 Auckland mayoral election
Party	Candidate	Votes	%	±%
Citizens & Ratepayers	John Allum	25,968	55.59	−7.74
Labour	Bill Schramm	19,498	41.74	
Independent	George Mullenger	908	1.94	
Informal votes		336	0.71	−0.14
Majority		6,470	13.85	−3.42
Turnout		46,710		

== Councillor results ==
1947 Auckland City Council election
Party	Candidate	Votes	%	±%
Citizens & Ratepayers	Leonard Coakley	26,076	58.33	+3.02
Citizens & Ratepayers	Fred Ambler	25,147	56.25	+3.86
Citizens & Ratepayers	Arthur Bailey	23,705	53.02	+2.99
Citizens & Ratepayers	Jack Garland	23,188	51.87	
Citizens & Ratepayers	Joan Rattray	23,108	51.69	+5.41
Citizens & Ratepayers	Roy McElroy	22,918	51.26	+4.39
Citizens & Ratepayers	Mary Wright	22,807	51.02	
Citizens & Ratepayers	Archibald Ewing Brownlie	22,741	50.87	+7.74
Citizens & Ratepayers	John W. Kealy	22,391	50.08	+1.56
Citizens & Ratepayers	Barbara Roche	22,375	50.05	
Citizens & Ratepayers	William Mackay	22,039	49.30	
Citizens & Ratepayers	Max Tongue	22,030	49.28	
Citizens & Ratepayers	Sidney Takle	21,899	48.98	+0.47
Citizens & Ratepayers	Reginald Stanley Harrop	21,895	48.97	+1.98
Citizens & Ratepayers	Joyce William Hyland	21,872	48.92	−4.72
Citizens & Ratepayers	Keith Buttle	21,739	48.63	−0.97
Citizens & Ratepayers	Bob Beechey	21,421	47.91	
Citizens & Ratepayers	Horace Kirk	21,135	47.27	
Citizens & Ratepayers	Howard Edward Gray Matthews	21,032	47.04	+2.85
Citizens & Ratepayers	Frederick George Lintott	20,993	46.96	
Citizens & Ratepayers	Aubrey Tronson	20,615	46.11	
Labour	Bill Butler	19,681	44.02	
Labour	Don Armishaw	18,731	41.90	
Labour	Elizabeth Wynn	18,293	40.92	+6.98
Labour	Albert Berry	18,104	40.49	+10.85
Labour	Paul Richardson	17,848	39.92	−5.52
Labour	Catherine Kelleher	17,824	39.87	
Labour	Harold Callagher	17,791	39.79	
Labour	William Duncan	17,763	39.73	
Labour	George Forsyth	17,681	39.55	
Labour	Pat Curran	17,630	39.43	
Labour	Harold S. Callagher	17,625	39.42	
Labour	Denis Brophy	17,569	39.30	
Labour	John Thomas Jennings	17,536	39.22	
Labour	Norman Finch	17,291	38.68	
Labour	Martin Charles Conroy	17,086	38.22	
Labour	Frederick Johnston	16,671	37.29	
Labour	Richard Wrathall	16,670	37.29	
Labour	Thomas Tucker	16,560	37.04	
Labour	Frank Williams	16,246	36.34	+6.66
Labour	Lyndon Peoples	16,226	36.29	
Labour	Eric Williamson	16,097	36.00	
Communist	Vic Wilcox	3,369	7.53	
Communist	George Jackson	3,362	7.52	−11.51
Independent	George Mullenger	3,338	7.46	
Communist	Arthur Jackson-Thomas	2,870	6.42	
Independent	Amy Milburn	2,536	5.67	
