= 1941 Auckland City mayoral election =

New Zealand mayoral election

← 1938	17 May 1941	1944 →
- Turnout: 32,969 (50.19%)
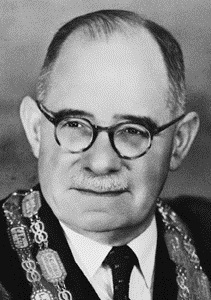

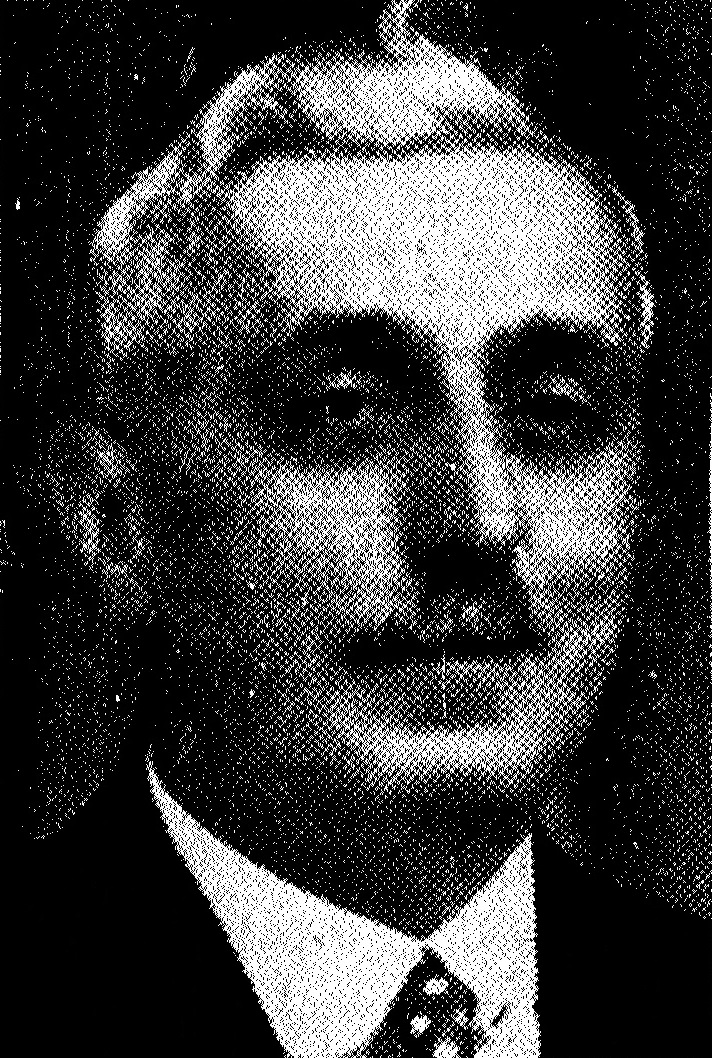
Candidate	John Allum	Joe Sayegh
Party	Citizens & Ratepayers	Labour
Popular vote	16,353	15,010
Percentage	49.60	45.52
Mayor before election
Sir Ernest Davis
Elected mayor
John Allum

The 1941 Auckland City mayoral election was part of the New Zealand local elections held that same year. In 1941, elections were held for the Mayor of Auckland plus other local government positions including twenty-one city councillors. The polling was conducted using the standard first-past-the-post electoral method.

The election saw deputy-mayor John Allum defeating the Labour nominee Joe Sayegh who suffered defeat for the third time in succession. Sayegh did not stand for the council as an inducement to vote for him as mayor, but he was elected to the Harbour Board and Hospital Board. The only successful Labour candidate for the council was Mary Dreaver, with the Citizens & Ratepayers ticket winning all other council seats.

== Background ==
Citizens & Ratepayers
The incumbent mayor Sir Ernest Davis declined to seek a further term. After Davis' retirement the deputy mayor John Allum and councillor Arthur Bailey were seen as likely replacements as the Citizens & Ratepayers Association nominee for mayor. At a meeting chaired by James Donald the Citizens & Ratepayers Association committee selected Allum as the mayoral candidate.

Labour
The Labour Party had six people nominated for the mayoralty:

- Bill Anderton, MP for Eden since 1935 and former city councillor (1935–41)
- Mary Dreaver, a Hospital Board member since 1931 city councillor since 1938
- Jim Purtell, secretary of the Trades and Labour Council and former city councillor (1936–38)
- Joe Sayegh, Labour's mayoral candidate at the previous two elections and former city councillor (1933–41)
- Bill Schramm, MP for Auckland East since 1931
- John Stewart, former city councillor (1935–38)

Sayegh was elected as the Labour candidate at a selection meeting of party delegates.

Others
Two independent candidates also stood. James William Payne, who stood for mayor in 1938, and Charles Bailey, formerly a Labour city councillor from 1933 to 1938.

== Mayoralty results ==
1941 Auckland mayoral election
Party	Candidate	Votes	%	±%
Citizens & Ratepayers	John Allum	16,353	49.60	
Labour	Joe Sayegh	15,010	45.52	+11.91
Independent	Charles Bailey	1,082	3.28	
Independent	James William Payne	218	0.66	−0.24
Informal votes		306	0.92	−0.26
Majority		1,343	4.07	
Turnout		32,969	50.19	−11.31

== Councillor results ==
1941 Auckland City Council election
Party	Candidate	Votes	%	±%
Citizens & Ratepayers	Leonard Coakley	17,215	52.21	+0.60
Citizens & Ratepayers	Arthur Bailey	16,805	50.97	−5.50
Citizens & Ratepayers	Reginald Judson	16,504	50.05	+1.54
Citizens & Ratepayers	Fred Ambler	16,305	49.45	
Citizens & Ratepayers	Ellen Melville	16,251	49.29	+0.22
Citizens & Ratepayers	Harold Burton	15,782	47.86	+0.44
Citizens & Ratepayers	William Fowlds	15,671	47.53	
Citizens & Ratepayers	William Brockway Darlow	15,604	47.32	
Citizens & Ratepayers	Harry Butcher	15,443	46.84	+4.38
Citizens & Ratepayers	Wilfred Fortune	15,383	46.65	
Citizens & Ratepayers	Sidney Takle	15,210	46.13	
Labour	Mary Dreaver	15,137	45.91	−1.30
Citizens & Ratepayers	Keith Buttle	14,984	45.44	
Citizens & Ratepayers	Roy McElroy	14,890	45.16	+1.84
Citizens & Ratepayers	Jack Garland	14,853	45.05	
Citizens & Ratepayers	Alan Brown	14,668	44.49	+1.48
Citizens & Ratepayers	Frederick George Farrell	14,628	44.36	
Citizens & Ratepayers	Claude James Lovegrove	14,572	44.19	
Citizens & Ratepayers	Reginald Harrop	14,469	43.88	
Citizens & Ratepayers	Michael Joseph Moodabe	14,402	43.68	
Citizens & Ratepayers	Alan Doull	14,001	42.46	
Labour	Jeremiah James Sullivan	13,858	42.03	−2.63
Labour	Bill Anderton	13,838	41.97	−3.94
Citizens & Ratepayers	William Power	13,771	41.76	
Labour	Peter Carr	13,647	41.39	−1.88
Labour	Fred Young	13,021	39.49	−2.82
Labour	Donald Campbell	13,010	39.46	
Labour	Paul Richardson	12,841	38.94	
Labour	Robert Boswell	12,794	38.80	
Labour	Elizabeth Wynn	12,520	37.97	−2.18
Labour	John Stewart	12,445	37.74	−2.44
Labour	Frederick George Beer	12,286	37.26	
Labour	George Gordon Grant	12,167	36.90	
Labour	Charles Stephen Morris	12,052	36.55	
Labour	Joseph Glen Kennerley	11,879	36.03	−2.12
Labour	Harold Callagher	11,688	35.45	
Labour	Charles James Matthew	11,646	35.32	−2.99
Labour	Harry Gordon Staley	11,558	35.05	−1.67
Labour	Esric Hunter	11,461	34.76	
Independent	Richard Armstrong	3,186	9.66	−34.17
Communist	Gordon Watson	2,363	7.16	
Communist	George Jackson	1,875	5.68	
Independent	Patricia Hurd	1,724	5.22	
Independent	James William Payne	1,715	5.20	
Communist	Henry Mornington Smith	1,626	4.93	
