= 1957 Auckland City mayoral by-election =

← 1956	2 November 1957	1959 →
- Turnout: 30,944
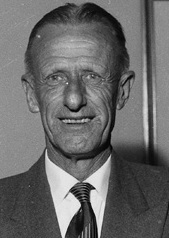

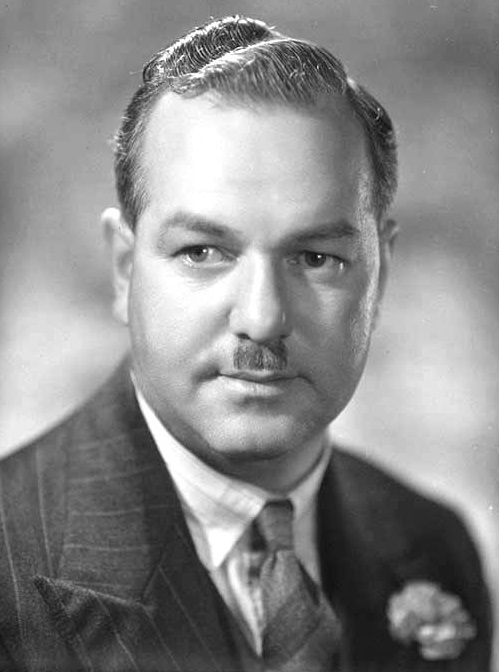

Candidate	Keith Buttle	John Stewart	Horace Kirk
Party	Citizens & Ratepayers	Labour	Independent
Popular vote	17,298	7,573	4,906
Percentage	55.90	24.47	15.85
Mayor before election
Tom Ashby
Elected mayor
Keith Buttle

The 1957 Auckland City mayoral by-election was held to fill the vacant position of Mayor of Auckland. The polling was conducted using the standard first-past-the-post electoral method.

== Background ==
The by-election was triggered by the death of sitting Mayor Tom Ashby. Five candidates put their names forward for the contest, with Deputy-Mayor Keith Buttle elected the new Mayor. Councillor Dove-Myer Robinson's United Independents (who had backed Ashby a year earlier) ticket chose to neither contest the election nor endorse a candidate.

== Results ==
The following table gives the election results:

1957 Auckland mayoral by-election
Party	Candidate	Votes	%	±%
Citizens & Ratepayers	Keith Buttle	17,298	55.90	
Labour	John Stewart	7,573	24.47	−6.10
Independent	Horace Kirk	4,906	15.85	
Independent	Pat Curran	1,038	3.35	
Independent	Trevor Innes	97	0.31	
Informal votes		32	0.10	−0.40
Majority		9,725	31.42	
Turnout		30,944		
