= List of by-elections to the Auckland City Council =

By-elections to the Auckland City Council occur to fill vacant seats in the City Council. The death, resignation, bankruptcy or expulsion of a sitting Councillor can cause a by-election to occur.

== Background ==
Local by-elections usually had a lower turnout compared to full local body elections. A notorious example occurred in August 1961 when a vacancy triggered the second by-election in under a year which had a turnout of only 3.65% of voters, prompting Mayor Dove-Myer Robinson to label the light turnout "...absolutely disgraceful. By failing to exercise their democratic right the public is just asking Parliament to take away from them the right to vote". By-elections on the city council were on occasion deferred if a substantial majority of the council agreed to fill the vacancy by appointment, resulting in the highest polling unsuccessful candidate at the previous election being appointed to the council unless there is a public demand for a poll to be held (known as extraordinary vacancies). This arrangement has happened several times such as in 1940 when Charles Bailey resigned his seat which was taken by Harry Butcher and March 1953 when Arthur Bailey died and his seat was taken by Bob Beechey.

Two future Mayors of Auckland (John Allum and Dove-Myer Robinson) entered the council via by-elections in 1920 and 1952 respectively.

== List of by-elections ==
Between 1903 and 1986 municipal elections in Auckland were conducted at-large. Between 1986 and 2010 municipal elections in Auckland were held via a Wards system of local electoral districts. The following is a list of by-elections held to fill vacancies on the Auckland City Council:

Key

Independent	Labour	Citizens & Ratepayers	United Independents	Civic Reform	Alliance

Ward	Date	Incumbent	Cause	Winner
At-large	2 April 1908	Robert Stopford	Resignation	John Patterson
At-large	14 October 1909	Moncrieff Murray McCallum	Resignation	Ralph Thomas Michaels
At-large	18 May 1910	Lemuel Bagnall	Resignation	Henry Shaw
At-large	2 September 1910	Herbert Smeeton	Resignation	Jonathan Trevethick
At-large	18 November 1920	Ernest Davis	Resignation	John Allum
At-large	18 November 1920	Andrew Entrican	Resignation	George Hutchison
At-large	22 December 1921	Patrick Nerheny	Death	George Davis
At-large	28 April 1922	Harold Dennett Heather	Death	Alfred Lawry
At-large	28 April 1922	Peter Mitchell Mackay	Death	Samuel Crookes
At-large	25 October 1922	Horatio Bagnall	Death	Christopher Furness
At-large	7 November 1928	Frederick Brinsden	Death	Tom Bloodworth
At-large	27 May 1936	John William Yarnall	Death	Jim Purtell
At-large	6 July 1938	George Richardson	Death	Charles Bailey
At-large	5 April 1952	Howard Hunter	Expulsion	Dove-Myer Robinson
At-large	16 October 1954	Fred Ambler	Expulsion	Fred Ambler
At-large	16 October 1954	Bruce Barnett	Resignation	Val Chapman
At-large	14 December 1957	Keith Buttle	Resignation	Wilfred Fortune
At-large	4 October 1958	Howard Hunter	Death	Charlie Passmore
At-large	4 February 1961	James Neil Bradley	Death	Val Chapman
At-large	26 August 1961	Mary Dreaver	Death	Howard Jeffreys
At-large	20 April 1963	Tom Pearce	Expulsion	Tom Pearce
At-large	20 April 1963	Fred de Malmanche	Resignation	William Grant-Mackie
At-large	10 February 1979	Bill Barrett	Death	Richard Northey
Avondale	5 December 1987	Barry Donovan	Death	Brian Maude
Central	12 November 1988	Harold Goodman	Death	Sue Corbett
Maungakiekie	4 May 1991	Grahame Thorne	Resignation	Ken Graham
Hauraki Gulf Islands	28 May 1994	Sandra Lee	Resignation	Gordon Hodson
Avondale-Roskill	11 November 2000	Phil Raffills	Death	Noelene Raffills
Avondale-Roskill	9 April 2008	Linda Leighton	Death	John Lister

== Results ==
=== 1908 by-election ===
1908 Auckland City Council by-election
Party	Candidate	Votes	%	±%
Citizens	John Patterson	1,461	40.78	+6.41
Independent	George Read	966	26.96	
Independent	George Gregory	612	17.08	+0.75
Independent	Samuel White	242	6.75	
Ind. Labour League	William Rowland	217	6.05	−7.29
Independent	Rupert Mantell	40	1.11	
Informal votes		44	1.22	
Majority		495	13.81	
Turnout		3,582	17.90	−21.20

=== 1909 by-election ===
1909 Auckland City Council by-election
Party	Candidate	Votes	%	±%
Citizens	Ralph Thomas Michaels	1,436	51.98	+11.76
Independent	John Mitchell	738	26.34	
Ind. Labour League	Thomas Walsh	314	11.21	
Independent	William Black	194	6.92	−9.13
Independent	Joseph George Haddow	39	6.92	
Informal votes		80	2.85	
Majority		718	25.63	
Turnout		2,801	14.36	

=== May 1910 by-election ===
May 1910 Auckland City Council by-election
Party	Candidate	Votes	%	±%
Citizens	Henry Shaw	1,662	54.94	+7.83
Independent	Ernest William Burton	828	27.37	
Independent	William Richardson	318	10.51	
Independent	Thomas Harkins	201	6.64	
Informal votes		16	0.52	
Majority		834	27.57	
Turnout		3,025	15.92	

=== September 1910 by-election ===
September 1910 Auckland City Council by-election
Party	Candidate	Votes	%	±%
Citizens	Jonathan Trevethick	1,420	60.68	
Independent	Ernest William Burton	902	38.54	+11.17
Informal votes		18	0.76	
Majority		518	22.13	
Turnout		2,340	12.31	

=== 1920 by-election ===
1920 Auckland City Council by-election
Party	Candidate	Votes	%	±%
Progressive Citizens'	George Hutchinson	3,495	67.93	
Progressive Citizens'	John Allum	3,115	60.54	
Independent	James Dickson	2,568	49.91	
Labour	Ted Phelan	2,316	45.01	+7.00
Labour	Oscar McBrine	2,222	43.18	+8.15
Informal votes		70	1.36	
Majority		547	10.63	
Turnout		5,145		

=== 1921 by-election ===
1921 Auckland City Council by-election
Party	Candidate	Votes	%	±%
Labour	George Davis	1,205	47.57	+7.70
Progressive Citizens'	Eric Inder	1,186	46.82	+1.03
Independent	Ernest Clark	142	5.60	
Majority		19	0.75	
Turnout		2,533		

=== April 1922 by-election ===
April 1922 Auckland City Council by-election
Party	Candidate	Votes	%	±%
Progressive Citizens'	Alfred Lawry	3,286	30.28	
Progressive Citizens'	Samuel Crookes	3,246	29.91	
Labour	Ted Phelan	2,245	20.68	−13.60
Labour	Dick Barter	2,075	19.12	−7.77
Majority		1,001	9.22	
Turnout		5,426	15.10	

=== October 1922 by-election ===
October 1922 Auckland City Council by-election
Party	Candidate	Votes	%	±%
Independent	Christopher H. Furness	1,984	37.99	
Progressive Citizens'	Dick Thompson	1,657	31.73	
Labour	Jeremiah James Sullivan	1,581	30.27	
Majority		327	6.26	
Turnout		5,222	14.50	

=== 1928 by-election ===
1928 Auckland City Council by-election
Party	Candidate	Votes	%	±%
Labour	Tom Bloodworth	4,350	55.56	+21.63
Progressive Citizens'	John Lundon	2,870	36.65	+7.26
Independent	Harold Schmidt	693	8.85	+0.82
Majority		1,480	18.90	
Turnout		7,829	19.18	

=== 1936 by-election ===
1936 Auckland City Council by-election
Party	Candidate	Votes	%	±%
Labour	Jim Purtell	4,146	59.42	+18.16
Citizens & Ratepayers	William Lang Casey	2,233	32.00	
Independent	James Payne	543	7.78	+2.02
Informal votes		55	0.78	
Majority		1,913	27.41	
Turnout		6,977		

=== 1938 by-election ===
1936 Auckland City Council by-election
Party	Candidate	Votes	%	±%
Labour	Charles Bailey	11,434	51.32	+16.36
Citizens & Ratepayers	Harry Butcher	10,758	48.28	+6.02
Informal votes		87	0.39	
Majority		676	3.03	
Turnout		22,279		

=== 1952 by-election ===
1952 Auckland City Council by-election
Party	Candidate	Votes	%	±%
Independent	Dove-Myer Robinson	4,874	45.21	
Labour	Richard Wrathall	3,761	34.89	+0.73
Citizens & Ratepayers	Aubrey Tronson	2,144	19.89	−14.95
Majority		1,113	10.32	
Turnout		10,779	11.42	

=== 1954 by-election ===
1954 Auckland City Council by-election
Party	Candidate	Votes	%	±%
Citizens & Ratepayers	Fred Ambler	4,523	29.13	−13.48
United Independents	Val Chapman	3,816	24.58	
Labour	Edith Williams	3,127	20.14	−7.74
Labour	Ronald Akersten	2,901	18.68	−10.94
Independent	George Mullenger	1,139	7.33	+1.17
Informal votes		17	0.10	
Majority		689	4.43	
Turnout		15,523	16.38	

=== 1957 by-election ===
1957 Auckland City Council by-election
Party	Candidate	Votes	%	±%
Citizens & Ratepayers	Wilfred Fortune	3,675	39.20	
Labour	William Grant-Mackie	2,011	21.45	−9.66
United Independents	Frederick Johnston	1,248	13.31	−16.10
Independent	Roy Turner	832	8.87	
Independent	Charles Fisher	518	5.52	−21.42
Independent	Mary Dawson-Wright	445	4.74	
Independent	Richard Armstrong	327	3.48	
Independent	George Mullenger	304	3.24	
Informal votes		13	0.13	
Majority		1,664	17.75	
Turnout		9,373		

=== 1958 by-election ===
1958 Auckland City Council by-election
Party	Candidate	Votes	%	±%
Citizens & Ratepayers	Charlie Passmore	2,431	41.23	
Labour	William Grant-Mackie	1,473	24.98	+3.53
Independent	Roy Turner	989	16.77	+7.90
United Independents	Frederick Johnston	975	16.53	+3.22
Informal votes		27	0.45	+0.32
Majority		958	16.25	
Turnout		5,895	8.11	

=== February 1961 by-election ===
February 1961 Auckland City Council by-election
Party	Candidate	Votes	%	±%
Civic Reform	Val Chapman	2,475	56.14	
Independent	Cecil Paine	460	10.43	
Communist	Rita Smith	380	8.62	
Independent	Raymond Barker	339	7.69	
Independent	Mary Dawson-Wright	267	6.05	
Independent	George Mullenger	251	5.69	
Independent	Harold Barry	236	5.35	
Majority		2,015	45.71	
Turnout		4,408	5.80	

=== August 1961 by-election ===
August 1961 Auckland City Council by-election
Party	Candidate	Votes	%	±%
Labour	Howard Jeffreys	2,203	84.86	+51.02
Communist	Rita Smith	341	13.13	+4.51
Informal votes		52	2.00	
Majority		1,862	71.72	
Turnout		2,596	3.65	

=== 1963 by-election ===
1963 Auckland City Council by-election
Party	Candidate	Votes	%	±%
Citizens & Ratepayers	Tom Pearce	2,766	27.64	−9.14
Civic Reform	William Grant-Mackie	2,672	26.70	−6.54
Citizens & Ratepayers	Clifton Keegan	2,517	25.15	−9.89
Labour	Thomas Price	1,205	12.04	−7.13
Communist	Bill Andersen	454	4.53	−14.82
Communist	George Jackson	363	3.62	−5.36
Informal votes		27	0.26	
Majority		155	1.54	
Turnout		10,004	12.50	

=== 1979 by-election ===
1979 Auckland City Council by-election
Party	Candidate	Votes	%	±%
Labour	Richard Northey	2,798	41.20	+6.89
Citizens & Ratepayers	Kevin Ryan	1,538	22.64	
Independent	Bute Hewes	1,386	20.40	
Independent	Phil Warren	595	8.76	
Independent	Matthew Connor	264	3.88	−13.95
Cheer Up	Vince Terreni	210	3.09	
Majority		1,260	18.55	
Turnout		6,791		

=== 1987 by-election, Avondale Ward ===
1987 Avondale Ward by-election
Party	Candidate	Votes	%	±%
Independent	Brian Maude	1,612	38.65	
Independent	Jan Grefstad	896	21.48	
Citizens & Ratepayers	Sefulu Ioane	849	20.35	−17.16
Labour	Nora Rameka	813	19.49	
Majority		716	17.17	
Turnout		4,170		

=== 1988 by-election, Central Ward ===
1988 Central Ward by-election
Party	Candidate	Votes	%	±%
Citizens & Ratepayers	Sue Corbett	1,172	32.82	
Independent	Ross Baxter	969	27.14	
Independent	Peter Boys	732	20.50	
Independent	Peter Beyer	419	11.73	
Independent	Alan Clay	144	4.03	
Independent	Raymond Hyams	134	3.75	−18.29
Majority		203	5.68	
Turnout		3,570	28.38	

=== 1991 by-election, Maungakiekie Ward ===
1991 Maungakiekie Ward by-election
Party	Candidate	Votes	%	±%
Citizens & Ratepayers	Ken Graham	3,536	37.70	
Labour	Richard Northey	1,723	18.37	
Green	Laurie Ross	1,507	16.07	
Independent	Peter Boys	1,356	14.46	
Independent	Andrew Stanley	1,255	13.38	−7.59
Majority		1,813	19.33	
Turnout		9,377		

=== 1994 by-election, Hauraki Gulf Islands Ward ===
1994 Hauraki Gulf Islands Ward by-election
Party	Candidate	Votes	%	±%
Independent	Gordon Hodson	964	33.42	
Independent	Greg Davenport	845	29.29	
Independent	Robert Shadbolt	274	9.50	
Independent	Bruce Marx	261	9.04	
Community Independent	Peta Dubbelman	172	5.96	
Independent	Robyn Storey	136	4.71	
Independent	Ian Andrews	102	3.53	
Independent	John Cranstoun	66	2.28	−23.84
Independent	Frederick Boric	64	2.21	
Majority		119	4.12	
Turnout		2,884		

=== 2000 by-election, Avondale/Roskill Ward ===
Avondale/Roskill Ward by-election, 2000
Party	Candidate	Votes	%	±%
Citizens & Ratepayers	Noelene Raffills	7,041	35.48	
Independent	Penny Bright	6,273	31.61	
City Vision	Doug Mansill	2,396	12.07	
Independent	Kathy Henderson	1,829	9.21	
Independent	Duncan McDonald	1,454	7.32	
Independent	Jan Grefsted	851	4.28	
Majority		768	3.87	
Turnout		19,844	36.33	

=== 2008 by-election, Avondale/Roskill Ward ===
Avondale/Roskill Ward by-election, 2008
Party	Candidate	Votes	%	±%
Citizens & Ratepayers	John Lister	4,710	29.01	
City Vision	Catherine Farmer	4,296	26.46	
Independent	Paul Davie	2,637	16.24	
Independent	Feleti Key	1,641	10.11	−3.45
Independent	Mohammad Tauqir Khan	1,063	6.54	−2.97
Independent	Gillian Bagnall	719	4.42	
Independent	John Williams	569	3.50	
Majority		414	2.55	
Turnout		16,231	26.10	
