= United Independents =

United Independents (New Zealand)
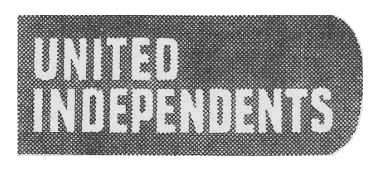
- Leader: Dove-Myer Robinson
- Founded: 1953
- Dissolved: 1959
- Succeeded by: Civic Reform
- Ideology: Grassroots democracy Environmentalism
- Political position: Centre

The United Independents (New Zealand) were a centrist oriented local body electoral ticket in Auckland, New Zealand. The group was formed in 1953 by combining a selection process for council candidates backed by several civic interest groups and lobby groups opposed to a proposed sewerage scheme. Its main ambition was to control the balance of power on the Auckland City Council and stop the sewerage scheme.

== History ==
The United Independents group traces its origins back to a group of grassroot locals voicing their opposition to a council proposal to discharge Auckland's sewage into Waitemata Harbour, known as the 'Brown's Island' scheme. Lobbying tactics proved ineffective to stopping the scheme and so opponents turned to political action in order to dissuade local politicians. The most noted public opponent to Brown's Island, Dove-Myer Robinson, used his local renown from the issue and won an Auckland City Council by-election in 1952 and thereby gained membership to the Auckland Metropolitan Drainage Board and continued to criticise Brown's Island from within.

In the lead up to the 1953 municipal elections he helped form the United Independents, candidates who were independent of each other on all issues except Brown's Island on which they were all united. The United Independents won five seats and held the balance of power between the long established Citizens & Ratepayers and Labour Party tickets. The United Independents also endorsed John Luxford's candidacy for Auckland's Mayoralty. Luxford defeated incumbent Mayor John Allum, who was a supporter of the Brown's Island scheme. By allowing the Citizens & Ratepayers to appoint their preferred candidates to committee chairmanships they desired, the United Independents were in turn able to seize control of the Drainage Board and halt Brown's Island development. The United Independents then proposed an alternative scheme for oxidation ponds to be built in Manukau Harbour near Māngere which would break down the sewage naturally, a new technique pioneered in California, which was approved.

The 1956 municipal elections had less success for the United Independents. The group had fallen out with Luxford, who now stood for the Citizens & Ratepayers Association. The United Independents viewed Luxford as a traitor and gave their endorsement to Auckland's former Town Clerk Tom Ashby, who defeated Luxford. However the United Independents themselves fared less successfully, losing two seats on the council and their hold on the balance of power. Further setbacks occurred when Ashby died suddenly. The United Independents did not contest the ensuing Mayoral by-election which saw Citizens & Ratepayers candidate Keith Buttle defeat Labour's John Stewart.

By 1959 the United Independents had merged with the Labour ticket and jointly contested that years municipal elections under the new Civic Reform banner. Robinson successfully contested the Mayoralty as an Independent, with informal support from Civic Reform.

== Electoral results ==
=== Council seats ===
Year	no. of seats won	% of seats	±
1953	5 / 21	23.8%	▲4
1956	3 / 21	14.2%	▼2
1959	3 / 21	14.2%	0
1962	3 / 21	14.2%	0

== Notable members ==
- Dove-Myer Robinson
- Ken Cumberland
- Eric Armishaw
- Tom Ashby
- Val Chapman
