= Reg Savory =

New Zealand businessman

Sir Reginald Charles Frank Savory CBE (27 May 1908 – 27 October 1989) was a New Zealand businessman and politician who introduced container ship capability to Auckland.

== Biography ==
=== Early life and career ===
Savory was born in Ponsonby in 1908. He was the oldest of five children and attended Auckland Grammar School until the age of 14 when he was forced to look for employment to help with family finances. He took a job as an office boy at the Auckland Gas Company. He found work as a carpenter and helped build many of the high quality houses in Remuera in the 1920s. After his five-year apprenticeship became a fully qualified chippie and joiner after taking night classes at the Seddon Memorial Technical College. Soon afterwards he lost his job after construction was cut short by the onset of the Great Depression. He proceeded to start his own building business leading him to public life.

He founded R. Savory Ltd, a carpentry business which eventually became a full construction company. During World War II his company built barracks structures for American troops stationed in Warkworth and the Auckland Domain. The company later built Middlemore Hospital and Ardmore Airport. In 1947 he was elected President of the Auckland Master Builders Association. In 1951 he was made president of the New Zealand Builders' Federation.

=== Political career ===
In 1953 he stood on the Citizens & Ratepayers (C&R) ticket for the Auckland City Council and was elected a member. He was re-elected in 1959 and 1962, holding a seat on the council for nine years. He was appointed chairman of the works and planning committee. In 1956 he introduced the first town plan of any city in New Zealand. In 1962 Savory was part of a group of C&R councillors (alongside Charlie Passmore and Fred de Malmanche) who had persuaded the president of the Auckland Chamber of Commerce Edgar Faber to run for the Auckland mayoralty against Dove-Myer Robinson. They convinced him to do so by telling him exaggerated stories of Robinson's personal conduct and his behaviour during council business. Faber began to regret being involved in the mayoral contest as it began to affect his health and planned to withdraw from the race, but Savory and the other C&R councillors insisted he continue. Shortly after the election Faber discovered he was dying of cancer and confided to Robinson that the C&R trio had used him against Robinson for "purely mercenary ends".

Savory had mayoral aspirations and frequently clashed with Mayor Dove-Myer Robinson. He described Robinson as a "troublemaking little upstart came along and stole the mayoralty" and as "a manipulating Jew boy". Savory's dislike of Robinson was more than mutual, originating in Robinson's opposition to a sewage dumping scheme (the Browns Island plan that would have discharged effluent into Waitematā Harbour) that Savory supported.

He was a member of the Auckland Harbour Board and was chairman from 1961 to 1972. As chairman he oversaw the downtown redevelopment, with increasing skyscrapers, and also initiated the construction of Fergusson Wharf. After making exploratory visits to London and Oakland, California to examine containerisation he upgraded Auckland Harbour to accommodate container ships to ensure that the port remained logistically and financially viable.

He was also a board member of the Auckland Technical Institute for over three decades. In his youth technical education had helped him in his career and maintained an interest in it all his life. He was chairman of the board for 28 years from 1952 to 1980.

=== Later life and death ===
In the 1965 Queen's Birthday Honours, Savory was appointed a Commander of the Order of the British Empire, in recognition of his services to local government and technical education. In the 1972 Queen's Birthday Honours, he was appointed a Knight Bachelor, for outstanding services to local government and education.

Savory suffered from diabetes and in 1973 he had his right leg amputated below the knee, the result of circulatory problems. His wife Fai-Ola Savory predeceased him in 1983.

He died in his sleep on 27 October 1989 aged 81. He was survived by two daughters and six grandchildren.

== Notes ==
Political offices
Preceded by Ernest Turner	Chairman of the Auckland Harbour Board; 1961–1972	Succeeded by Robert William Carr
