= Ken Cumberland =

New Zealand geologist, academic and politician (1913–2011)

Ken Cumberland CBE
- Born: Kenneth Brailey Cumberland; 1 October 1913; Bradford, Yorkshire, England
- Died: 17 April 2011 (aged 97); Manurewa, New Zealand
- Education: University of New Zealand
- Scientific career
- Fields: Physical geography
- Thesis: The regional morphology of soil erosion in New Zealand: a geographic reconnaissance (DSc, 1945)

Kenneth Brailey Cumberland CBE (1 October 1913 – 17 April 2011) was a New Zealand geography academic and local-body politician.

== Academic career ==
After a bachelor's in geography at Nottingham University College and a MSc at University College London, Cumberland emigrated to Canterbury College, Christchurch (now the University of Canterbury) immediately before the outbreak of World War II. After the war he moved to Auckland University College (now the University of Auckland). In each place he played a key role in the establishment of teaching of physical geography. After retiring in 1978 he made and narrated a television series, Landmarks, on the geography of New Zealand.

== Political career ==
Cumberland was an associate of Dove-Myer Robinson and were both members of the Drainage League that opposed the Brown's Bay scheme supported by the then mayor John Allum. Later, he was elected to the Auckland City Council in 1953 as part of Robinson's United Independents ticket. He was re-elected in both 1956 and 1959; in the latter he was on the "Civic Reform" ticket that briefly succeeded the United Independents. He was the leader of the Civic Reform group at the 1959 election.

== Honours ==
Cumberland was elected a Fellow of the Royal Society of New Zealand in 1973. In the 1982 Queen's Birthday Honours, he was appointed a Commander of the Order of the British Empire, for services to geography and the community.

== Death ==
Cumberland died on 17 April 2011, aged 97. He was survived by two of his children.
