= Fred Glasse =

New Zealand electrical engineer and local-body politician

Fred Glasse CMG OBE MC OStJ JP
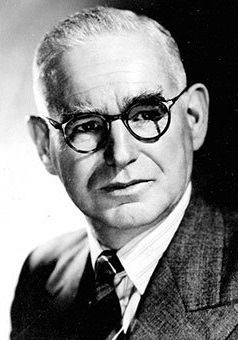
- Glasse circa 1943

14th Deputy Mayor of Auckland
- In office 31 October 1962 – 16 September 1970
- Mayor: Dove-Myer Robinson; Roy McElroy
- Preceded by: Fred Ambler
- Succeeded by: Max Tounge

Personal details
- Born: 4 December 1889 Dunedin, New Zealand
- Died: 13 December 1977 (aged 88) Auckland, New Zealand
- Education: University of Otago
- Profession: Engineer

Alfred Onslow Glasse CMG OBE MC OStJ JP (4 December 1889 – 13 December 1977) was a New Zealand electrical engineer and local-body politician. He was chief engineer of the Auckland Electric Power Board for 29 years, and served as president of the New Zealand Institution of Engineers in 1942–43. Glasse was later elected as an Auckland City Councillor, and was deputy mayor from 1962 to 1970.

== Biography ==
=== Early life ===
Glasse was born in Dunedin in 1889 and was educated at Otago Boys' High School, Dunedin Technical College and then the University of Otago.

He trained as an engineer and travelled to Britain to gain further experience at the Thomson-Houston Electric Company, a large firm of electrical engineers. During World War I he enlisted in the New Zealand Expeditionary Force in 1914 and was awarded the Military Cross and mentioned in dispatches. Following the war he returned to work with the same firm.

=== Career ===
In 1922 the Thomson-Houston Company secured a contract for the supply of machinery and equipment to the Auckland City Council. Glasse was assigned back to New Zealand as the company's supervising engineer where he led the installation work of the new machinery. He subsequently joined the Auckland Electric Power Board as assistant engineer and after a few months was appointed chief engineer, holding the position until he retired 29 years later in 1954. He served as vice-president of the Institution from 1940 to 1942 and was president from 1942 to 1943. He also served as president of the Electric Supply Authority Engineers' Institute (1947–48).

In the 1952 Queen's Birthday Honours, Glasse was appointed an Officer of the Order of the British Empire, for services in the field of engineering. In 1953, he was awarded the Queen Elizabeth II Coronation Medal.

=== Political involvement ===
Following his retirement from engineering, Glasse became involved in civic affairs in Auckland. In the 1956 local elections, he was elected as a member of the Auckland City Council on a Citizens & Ratepayers ticket. Between 1962 and 1970 he served as Deputy Mayor of Auckland City. Glasse supported mayor Dove-Myer Robinson's local government reforms to establish the Auckland Regional Authority. He was also a member of the Auckland Metropolitan Drainage Board and the Harbour Bridge Authority, finally retiring from public office in 1976.

In the 1969 Queen's Birthday Honours, Glasse was appointed a Companion of the Order of St Michael and St George, for services to the community and particularly to local government in Auckland. 1963 saw him being appointed as an Officer of the Most Venerable Order of the Hospital of Saint John of Jerusalem.

=== Death and legacy ===
He died on 13 December 1977, aged 88.

The Alfred O. Glasse Award, an annual award by the New Zealand Planning Institute to recognise services to planning by non-planners, is named in Glasse's honour.

== Notes ==
Political offices
Preceded by Fred Ambler	Deputy Mayor of Auckland; 1962–1970	Succeeded by Max Tounge
