= Tom Ashby =

New Zealand lawyer and mayor of Auckland

Tom Ashby OBE
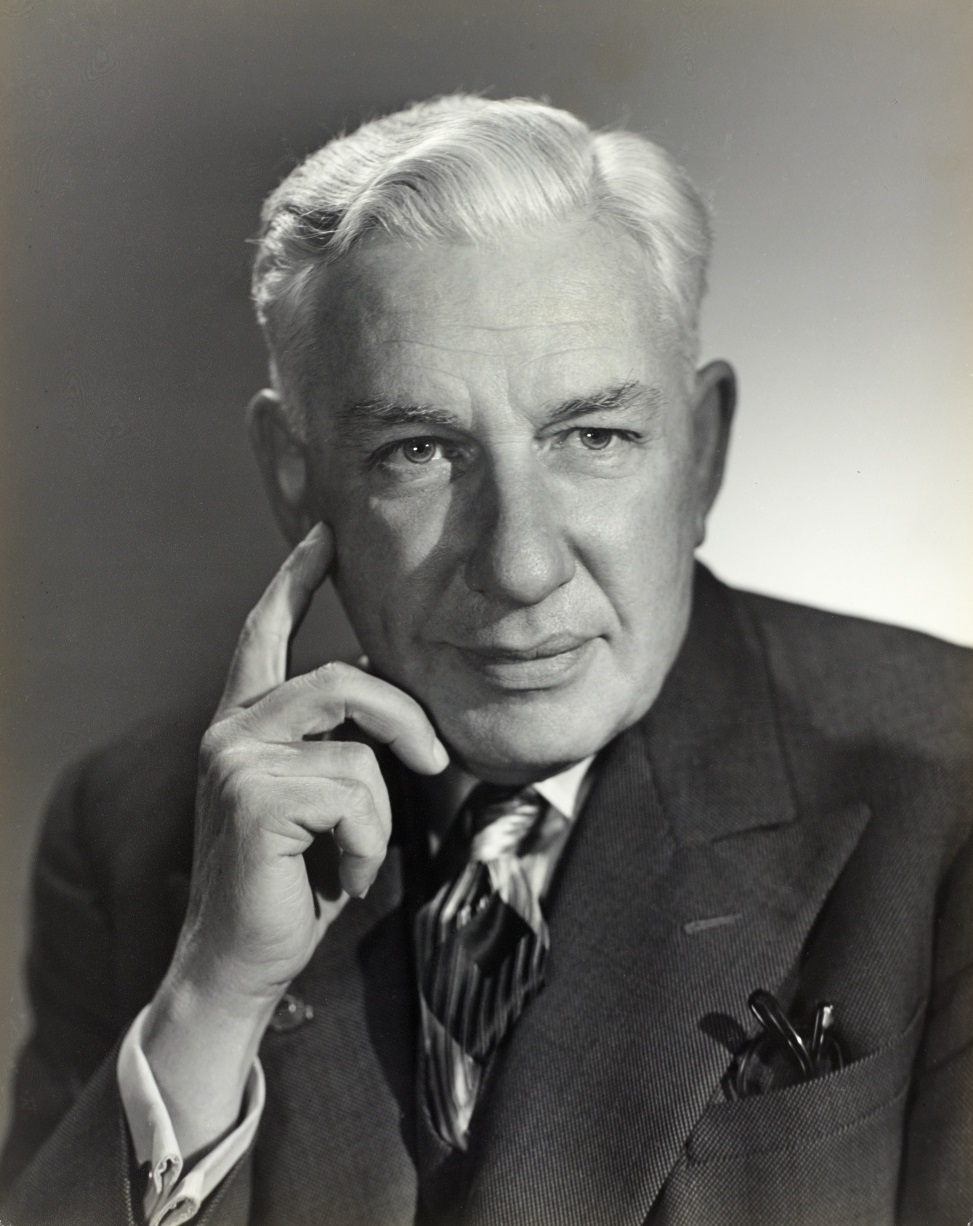

30th Mayor of Auckland City
- In office 3 December 1956 – 26 September 1957
- Deputy: Keith Buttle
- Preceded by: John Luxford
- Succeeded by: Keith Buttle

Personal details
- Born: 23 August 1895 Auckland, New Zealand
- Died: 26 September 1957 (aged 62) Auckland, New Zealand
- Spouse: Margaret Wilson Fox (m. 1921)
- Children: 5
- Occupation: Public Servant

Thomas William Mark Ashby JP OBE (23 August 1895 – 26 September 1957) was a New Zealand local body administrator and Mayor of Auckland City from 1956 to 1957.

== Biography ==
=== Early life and career ===
Ashby was born 23 August 1895 in Auckland, Ashby was educated at Te Aroha High School, and later at both Victoria and Auckland universities. In 1911 he entered the public service, being appointed to the head office staff of the Department of Education. After completing his university studies and qualified as a lawyer.

He served in the Army in the First World War, enlisting in the New Zealand Field Artillery in 1916 and was sent overseas as part of the 16th reinforcements. Serving in both France and Belgium, he was wounded in a leg and, in 1919 was invalided back to New Zealand. In 1920, he joined the Census and Statistics Office and was appointed as the compiler in charge of its local government and finance section. In March 1921 he married Margaret Fox in Petone.

In 1923, he joined the Auckland City Council as its law and committee clerk. In 1936 he was promoted to assistant Town Clerk in 1936, and the next year he was made city treasurer. In 1944 Ashby became Auckland's Town Clerk (providing administration and advice to Auckland City Council). He was a fellow of the New Zealand Society of Accountants, an associate member of the Australian Institute of Secretaries, a fellow of the Incorporated Institute of Secretaries, a member of the London Institute of Public Administration and the Standards Institute. He was also secretary of the committee for the 1950 British Empire Games held at Auckland. In the 1951 King's Birthday Honours, Ashby was appointed an Officer of the Order of the British Empire for municipal services. In 1953, he was awarded the Queen Elizabeth II Coronation Medal.

=== Political career ===
Having retired as Town Clerk in 1955, he remained engaged in the city's affairs, and in November 1956 successfully challenged the sitting mayor John Luxford, for the role. Luxford had claimed wasteful expenditure inside the council in his 1953 campaign, but (though initiating a number of reforms) had not been successful in chairing the council. On 16 May 1957 both he and his wife were injured in a car accident while on his way to welcome delegates attending a conference.

=== Death ===
Ashby died suddenly on 23 September 1957, near the end of his first year in office, aged 62 years, He collapsed and died suddenly at his home just after he had finished his dinner and was preparing to leave for the Auckland Town Hall concert chamber to hold a medal presentation to nurses. Complaining of a headache, he collapsed minutes later. A doctor was called, but Ashby had died instantly. He was survived by his wife and five sons.

He was replaced as mayor by Keith Buttle in a by-election in November 1957.

Political offices
Preceded by John Luxford	Mayor of Auckland City; 1956–1957	Succeeded by Keith Buttle
