= Bill Schramm =

New Zealand politician

The Honourable Bill Schramm
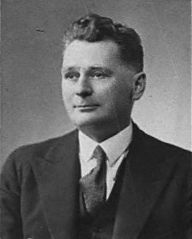

11th Speaker of the House of Representatives
- In office 22 February 1944 – 12 October 1946
- Prime Minister: Peter Fraser
- Preceded by: Bill Barnard
- Succeeded by: Robert McKeen

Member of the New Zealand Parliament for Auckland East
- In office 2 December 1931 – 12 October 1946
- Preceded by: James Donald
- Succeeded by: Constituency abolished

Personal details
- Born: Frederick William Schramm; 28 March 1886 Hokitika, New Zealand
- Died: 28 October 1962 (aged 76) Auckland, New Zealand
- Party: Labour
- Spouse: Alice Amelia Peard
- Children: 2

Frederick William Schramm (28 March 1886 – 28 October 1962) was a New Zealand politician of the Labour Party. He was the eleventh Speaker of the House of Representatives, from 1944 to 1946.

== Biography ==
=== Early life ===
Schramm was born in Hokitika in 1886. His Danish parents had arrived in New Zealand in the 1860s. He received his education at Hokitika High School and at Canterbury College. He was a prominent sports person in his younger years in athletics, cricket, and hockey, and represented Canterbury College in the New Zealand University championships for two years.

He married Alice Amelia Peard in 1918; they had two daughters. Schramm started his professional career as a clerk with the Justice Department and held positions in Whanganui and Te Kūiti before World War I, and Christchurch, Wellington, and Auckland after the war. He then became deputy-registrar and deputy-sheriff of the Auckland Supreme Court but resigned in 1922 to enter private practice. He was a solicitor and barrister for the last nine years before his election to Parliament.

=== Political career ===
New Zealand Parliament
Years	Term	Electorate	Party
1931–1935	24th	Auckland East	Labour
1935–1938	25th	Auckland East	Labour
1938–1943	26th	Auckland East	Labour
1943–1946	27th	Auckland East	Labour

In 1927 he stood unsuccessfully for the Auckland City Council on a Labour Party ticket. Schramm was a member of the Auckland University College Council until his resignation in 1942.

In the 1928 election, he contested the Hamilton electorate but came third. He was the Member of Parliament for Auckland East from 1931 to 1946; when he was defeated for the new electorate of Parnell. Originally an ally of John A. Lee, they fell out and Schramm moved for Lee's expulsion at the 1940 Labour conference. Lee supported the National candidate Duncan Rae who defeated Schramm in the Parnell electorate in 1946.

In early 1947 he was a nominee for the Mount Albert by-election but was not selected as the candidate. Soon afterwards Schramm, who was originally from Hokitika, was also speculated as a possible candidate at another by-election in Westland but suggestion of him seeking the candidacy was later dismissed.

In November 1947 he was Labour's candidate for the Auckland mayoralty, placing second behind sitting mayor Sir John Allum. Schramm wished to stand for the mayoralty again in 1950, but was beaten for the Labour nomination by former city councillor John Stewart. In 1949 he stood in Parnell once more and was again defeated. He was then President of the Auckland Labour Representation Committee from 1955 to 1957.

=== Awards and death ===
In 1935, Schramm was awarded the King George V Silver Jubilee Medal.

In August 1958 Schramm suffered a fall while on the sixth floor of Dilworth Buildings in Queen Street where he had an office. He broke his thigh bone and was admitted to Middlemore Hospital. He died in Auckland in 1962 and was buried at Purewa Cemetery.

== Notes ==
Political offices
Preceded by Bill Barnard	Speaker of the New Zealand House of Representatives; 1944–1946	Succeeded by Robert McKeen
New Zealand Parliament
Preceded by James Donald	Member of Parliament for Auckland East; 1931–1946	Constituency abolished
