= Pat Curran (New Zealand politician) =

Patrick Thomas Curran JP (12 December 1908 – 26 June 1985) was a New Zealand trade unionist and local-body politician.

== Biography ==
=== Early life and career ===
Curran was born in Ashburton in 1908 to Maurice Curran and Elizabeth Trevathan. He was a motoring enthusiast and together with his brother David, he established a motor dealership in Ashburton. Curran then married Phyllis and moved to Auckland shortly before World War II, David likewise moved to Auckland in 1946.

He also had a pilot's license and in 1940 enlisted in the Air Force during World War II and he served in the Pacific. In 1945 he was Mentioned in dispatches and awarded the Bronze Star Medal.

=== Political career ===
Curran was a sympathizer of John A. Lee and joined the Democratic Labour Party (DLP). In the 1943 he stood as the DLP candidate for the Auckland West, placing third out of four candidates. Curran later left the DLP and joined the Labour Party. He stood for election to the New Zealand House of Representatives for Eden in 1949, finishing second. He was Labour's candidate in the 1951 election in Roskill and later in the 1954 election in Tamaki, finishing runner-up on both occasions.

In 1947 he stood unsuccessfully for the Auckland City Council in a contest which saw all Labour candidates defeated. He stood on the Labour ticket again in 1953 and was successful, and was re-elected in 1956. During his time on the council he was chairman of the traffic committee and oversaw the introduction of Traffic lights to Auckland. In 1956 Curran and Mary Dreaver, who were both committee chairs on the 1953-56 council ignored a local ruling by the party that Labour councillors must refuse any future council chairmanships. Curran stated "We are elected to do a job. If I am asked to take a chairmanship again I will take it." In 1958 he introduced the Barnes Dance system of pedestrian crossing to solve intersection blockages, the first in New Zealand was situated Queen Street. Later that same year he was elected vice-president of the New Zealand Traffic Institute.

In May 1959 he was injured in a three-car accident near Sanson in which three people were killed. One of the others injured was Western Maori MP Iriaka Rātana. He and the others injured in the crash were taken to Palmerston North Hospital. He was treated for head injuries and fractured ribs but did not receive any serious injuries and recovered soon after.

He stood for the mayoralty in a 1957 by-election as an independent, but polled poorly receiving only 3.35 percent of the vote. He did not stand for the council in 1959, but stood again one final time in 1965 as an independent, but was unsuccessful.

=== Later life and death ===
Curran died at his home in Saint Heliers in 1985, survived by his wife and three children.
