= Fred Ambler =

New Zealand businessman and politician

Fred Ambler OBE JP
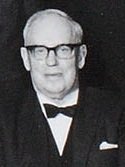

13th Deputy Mayor of Auckland
- In office 11 November 1957 – 31 October 1962
- Mayor: Keith Buttle (1957-9); Dove-Myer Robinson (1959-62)
- Preceded by: Keith Buttle
- Succeeded by: Fred Glasse

Personal details
- Born: 28 February 1894 Yorkshire, England
- Died: 23 August 1983 (aged 89) Auckland, New Zealand
- Spouse: Ella Skelton
- Children: 2
- Profession: Clothing manufacturer

Frederick Norman Ambler OBE JP (28 February 1894 – 1983) was a pioneering New Zealand businessman in the clothing trade and a long serving local-body politician.

== Biography ==
=== Early life ===
Ambler was born in a mill town in Yorkshire, England in 1894 to Herbert Ambler. He emigrated with his family to Christchurch when he was 13 years old. He gained employment in the clothing industry at the Kaiapoi Woollen Mills.

In 1917 he left for World War I as part of the New Zealand Rifle Brigade. He was seriously wounded in action and was returned to New Zealand. He spent many months prior to his return recovering in a St John hospital in Étaples, France. As a result, after his return to New Zealand he spent many years working for the St John Ambulance Association including as chairman of the association.

He married Helen (Ella) Skelton in Christchurch in 1919. At the age of 30 he was appointed a justice of the peace, the youngest in New Zealand. He was also a member of the Auckland Savage Club and president of the Auckland Kindergarten Association.

=== Business career ===
Ambler began Ambler & Company Ltd in Browns Bay in 1919 after applying for assistance from the Patriotic Fund. A clothing manufacturer, it used mass production methods for the first time in New Zealand following a trip by Ambler to Canada where he brought back more modern machinery. The company was to make its name initially by producing men's pyjamas and distinguished itself with its slogan "No one ever regretted buying quality" (which is still used to this day). It grew to become the largest men's shirt company in New Zealand.

He was involved in an early "buy New Zealand-made" advertising campaign and was a member of the Manufacturers Association, serving as its President in 1940–42. His son, Norman, replaced him as managing director of Ambler & Co in 1964.

=== Political career ===
In 1941 he stood on the Citizens & Ratepayers ticket for the Auckland City Council and was elected a member. His main motivation to stand for the council was to improve the Parnell Baths. His proposal was carried through and they were redecorated and given the addition of tables and chairs. He held a seat on the council for thirty years before he was finally defeated in 1971. In August 1954 he was disqualified from the council on a technicality, but was re-elected in October that year in the subsequent by-election. Ambler spearheaded the addition of potted palms to beautify inner-city street sides and the planning of Auckland's civic complex. He served for many years as chairman of the Parks and Library committee and in 1957 he was appointed deputy-mayor following the election of Keith Buttle to the mayoralty. He remained deputy for five years until he was, in a surprise move, dropped from the Citizens & Ratepayers ticket ahead of the 1962 elections. Ambler was re-elected nonetheless as an independent candidate for a further three terms. By the time of his defeat in 1971 he was the longest ever serving member of the city council.

He was also a member of both the Auckland Harbour Bridge Authority and Auckland Drainage Board. As a member of the drainage board he became opposed to mayor John Allum's proposal to discharge Auckland's sewage into Waitemata Harbour, known as the 'Brown's Island' scheme and worked together, first with Labour Party councillor Bill Butler and then with Dove-Myer Robinson and the United Independents group to block the proposal.

=== Death and legacy ===
In the 1957 New Year Honours he was made an Officer of the Order of the British Empire. Fred Ambler's Lookout in Parnell Park is named in his honour.

Ambler died in 1983 aged 89, survived by his son, daughter and multiple grandchildren and great-grandchildren. His wife Ella had predeceased him in 1981. His son Norman Godfray Ambler was also an Auckland City Councillor from 1974 to 1983.

== Notes ==
Political offices
Preceded by Keith Buttle	Deputy Mayor of Auckland; 1957–1962	Succeeded by Fred Glasse
