= Alexander Drennan =

New Zealand labourer, trade unionist and communist

Alexander Drennan (16 December 1899 – 9 November 1971) was a New Zealand labourer, trade unionist, communist and watersider. He was born in Greenock, Renfrewshire, Scotland on 16 December 1899. Drennan was president of the Auckland branch of the New Zealand Waterside Workers Union during the 1951 waterfront dispute.
