= John Luxford =

New Zealand lawyer and politician (1890–1971)

John Luxford CMG
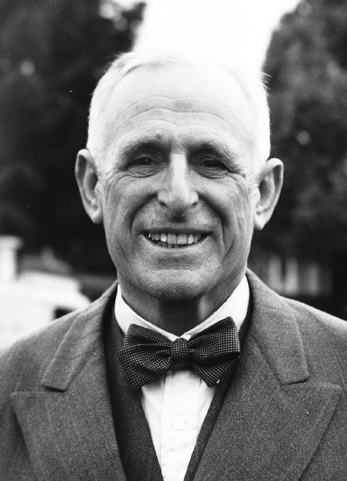

29th Mayor of Auckland City
- In office 26 November 1953 – 3 December 1956
- Deputy: Keith Buttle
- Preceded by: John Allum
- Succeeded by: Tom Ashby

Personal details
- Born: John Hector Luxford; 28 May 1890 Palmerston North, New Zealand
- Died: 8 April 1971 (aged 80) Auckland, New Zealand
- Spouse: Laura Luxford

John Hector Luxford CMG (28 May 1890 – 8 April 1971) was a New Zealand lawyer and Mayor of Auckland City from 1953 to 1956.

== Biography ==
Born in Palmerston North, Luxford qualified as a solicitor in 1913 and then during the First World War joined the army and saw military service in Europe and the Middle East, rising to the rank of Major. In 1919, soon after returning home from the war, he qualified as a barrister. He practised law in Te Awamutu, Hamilton, and Auckland, and was Chief Judge in Samoa from 1929 to 1935, then served as a magistrate in Auckland from 1941 to 1951. He wrote several law books and a memoir, With the Machine Gunners in France and Palestine.

Becoming a city councillor for Auckland, in 1953 Luxford was elected as mayor and initiated a number of reforms, but he was not successful in chairing the council. In 1956 he was defeated for mayor by Tom Ashby, who had previously been the Auckland Town Clerk from 1944 to 1955 and challenged Luxford's claims about wasteful expenditure inside the Council.

In the 1953 New Year Honours, Luxford was appointed a Companion of the Order of St Michael and St George. Later that year, he was awarded the Queen Elizabeth II Coronation Medal.

Political offices
Preceded by John Allum	Mayor of Auckland City; 1953–1956	Succeeded by Tom Ashby
