= Auckland Business Chamber =

New Zealand business network

Coordinates: 36.8569366°S 174.765563°E

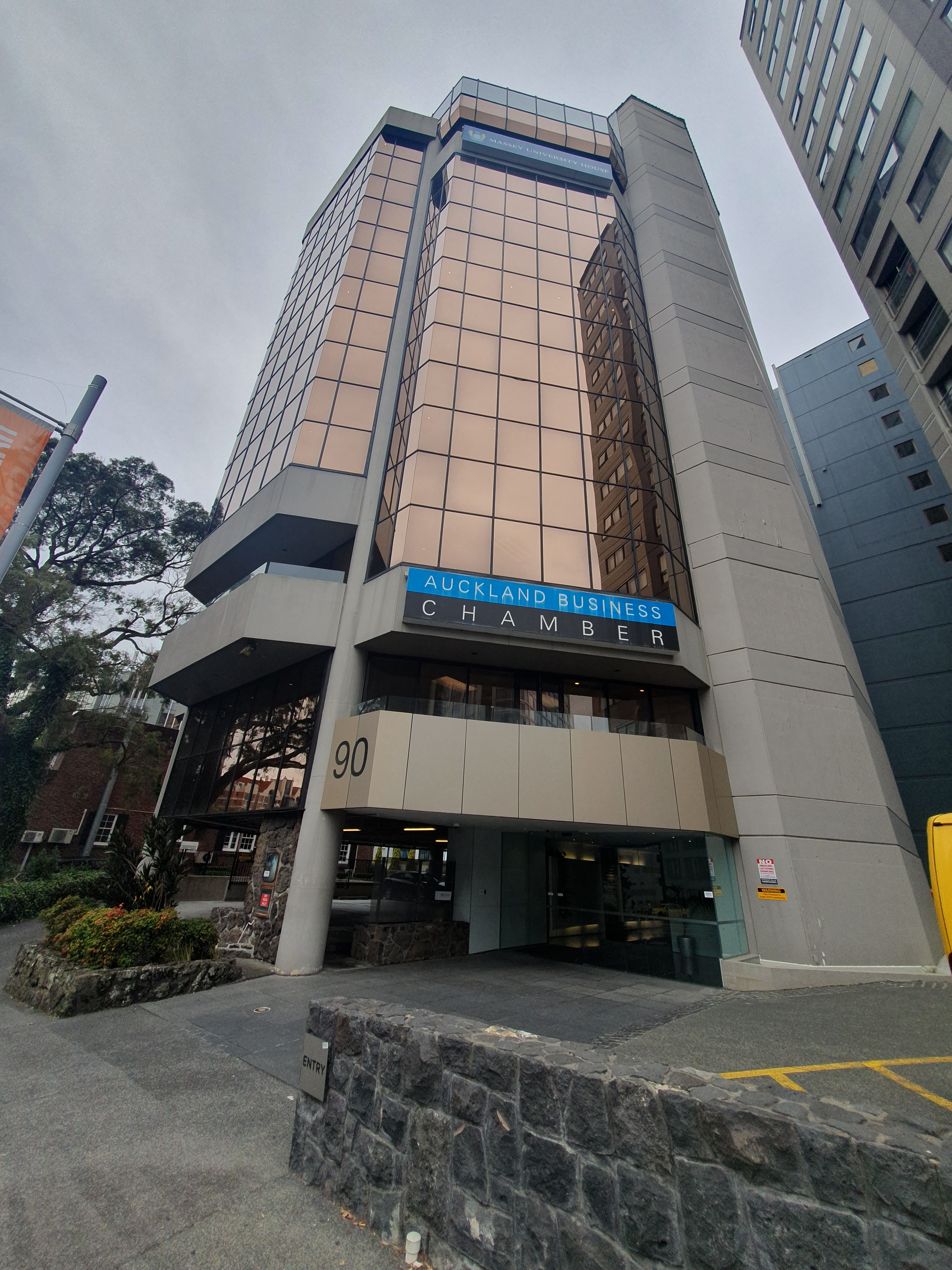
- Founded: 1856
- Type: Business network
- Purpose: Business advocacy
- Location: Auckland New Zealand
- Region served: Auckland industry
- Method: Business services, media attention, events and training
- Key people: Simon Bridges, Chief Executive Officer
- Website: aucklandchamber.co.nz

The Auckland Business Chamber (known as the Auckland Chamber of Commerce until 2018), is a New Zealand business network representing the interests of businesses in the Auckland region. It is a non-governmental organisation.

== History ==
The Chamber was founded in 1856, at a meeting of merchants on 24 January, during a period of economic depression. Active in the 1860s, the Chamber floundered somewhat before an 1869 reorganisation that opened its ranks to a wider variety of merchants, on an annual subscription basis.

Following its inception it focused on issues ranging from remedying trade abuses and obtaining adequate facilities for businesses, to standardization of grain weights and simplifying the customs tariff.

Michael Barnett was the chief executive and spokesperson for the Chamber from 1991 until 2022.

== Activities and services ==
The Chamber provides support to businesses, hosts events and training courses, and publishes business-related information. It advocates to government on behalf of its members.
