= John Stewart (New Zealand politician) =

New Zealand politician

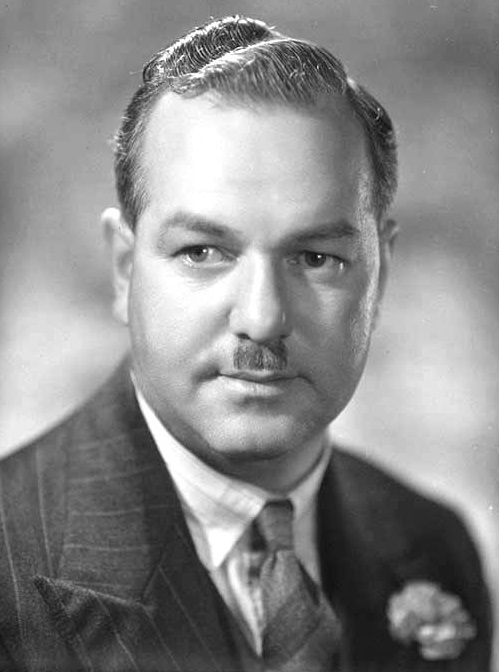
- Stewart in 1940

Member of the New Zealand Parliament for Arch Hill
- In office 1 September 1951 – 13 November 1954
- Preceded by: Bill Parry
- Succeeded by: Seat abolished

Member of the Auckland City Council
- In office 8 May 1935 – 11 May 1938
- Constituency: At-large

Personal details
- Born: 23 April 1902 Greenock, Scotland
- Died: 5 February 1973 (aged 70) Auckland, New Zealand
- Party: Labour
- Children: 2

John "Jock" Skinner Stewart (23 April 1902 – 5 February 1973) was a New Zealand politician of the Labour Party.

== Biography ==
=== Early life and career ===
Stewart was born in Greenock, Scotland and served in the British Army during World War I. He then emigrated to New Zealand when he was 24. He later gained employment with the Auckland Transport Board as a clerk.

During World War II he joined the military and was given a staff job as his medical grading prevented him from going abroad. At the end of 1942 he was released from service.

=== Political career ===
In 1935 he was elected to the Auckland City Council on a Labour Party ticket where he was chairman of the Library Committee. In both 1933 and 1938 Stewart was defeated standing for the City Council. He was also a member of the Auckland and Suburban Drainage Board. In both the 1950 and 1956 local elections as well as a 1957 by-election he was the Labour Party's candidate for the Auckland mayoralty, placing second, third and second respectively. He initially intended to stand a mayoral candidate in 1953 as well. He was selected as Labour's nominee but later withdrew his candidacy.

Stewart was present as a delegate at the 1940 Labour Party Annual Conference. Whilst in attendance Stewart seconded Auckland East MP Bill Schramm's successful motion to expel John A. Lee from the party. Later that year he stood for the Labour nomination at the Auckland West by-election following the death of Prime Minister Michael Joseph Savage, but lost to Peter Carr. Stewart then became chair of the Tamaki electorate committee and later Vice-President of the Auckland Labour Representation Committee.

=== Member of Parliament ===
New Zealand Parliament
| Years | Term | Electorate | Party |
|---|---|---|---|
| 1951–54 | 30th | Arch Hill | Labour |

Stewart was selected as the official Labour candidate for Remuera in the scheduled 1941 general election. He later contested the Kaipara electorate in the 1943 election, but lost to Clifton Webb. He then contested Marsden in 1946 election unsuccessfully.

He then represented the Arch Hill electorate in Auckland from 1951 to 1954 following the retirement of Bill Parry. In parliament Stewart became an agitator against the leadership of Walter Nash and successfully moved the motion in caucus to have a leadership election in mid-1954. Despite Stewart's efforts to replace Nash with Arnold Nordmeyer Nash was re-elected. The Arch Hill electorate was then absorbed into neighbouring electorates, and he was defeated in 1954, standing for Eden. Stewart was first on election night, with a provisional lead of 172, but after the 1,300 postal votes were counted he lost by a mere 8 votes to National's Duncan Rae. At the 1956 Labour Party annual conference he challenged Mick Moohan for the party presidency, but was defeated in the delegate ballot. At the 1957 conference he again challenged Moohan, but was again unsuccessful.

In 1953, Stewart was awarded the Queen Elizabeth II Coronation Medal.

=== Later life and death ===
After leaving parliament he returned to work as a clerk at the Auckland City Council until he retired in 1966.

He died on 5 February 1973. He was survived by his wife and two sons.

== Notes ==
New Zealand Parliament
| Preceded by Bill Parry | Member of Parliament for Arch Hill; 1951–1954 | Succeeded by Seat abolished |
