= Roy McElroy =

New Zealand lawyer and politician

Roy McElroy CMG
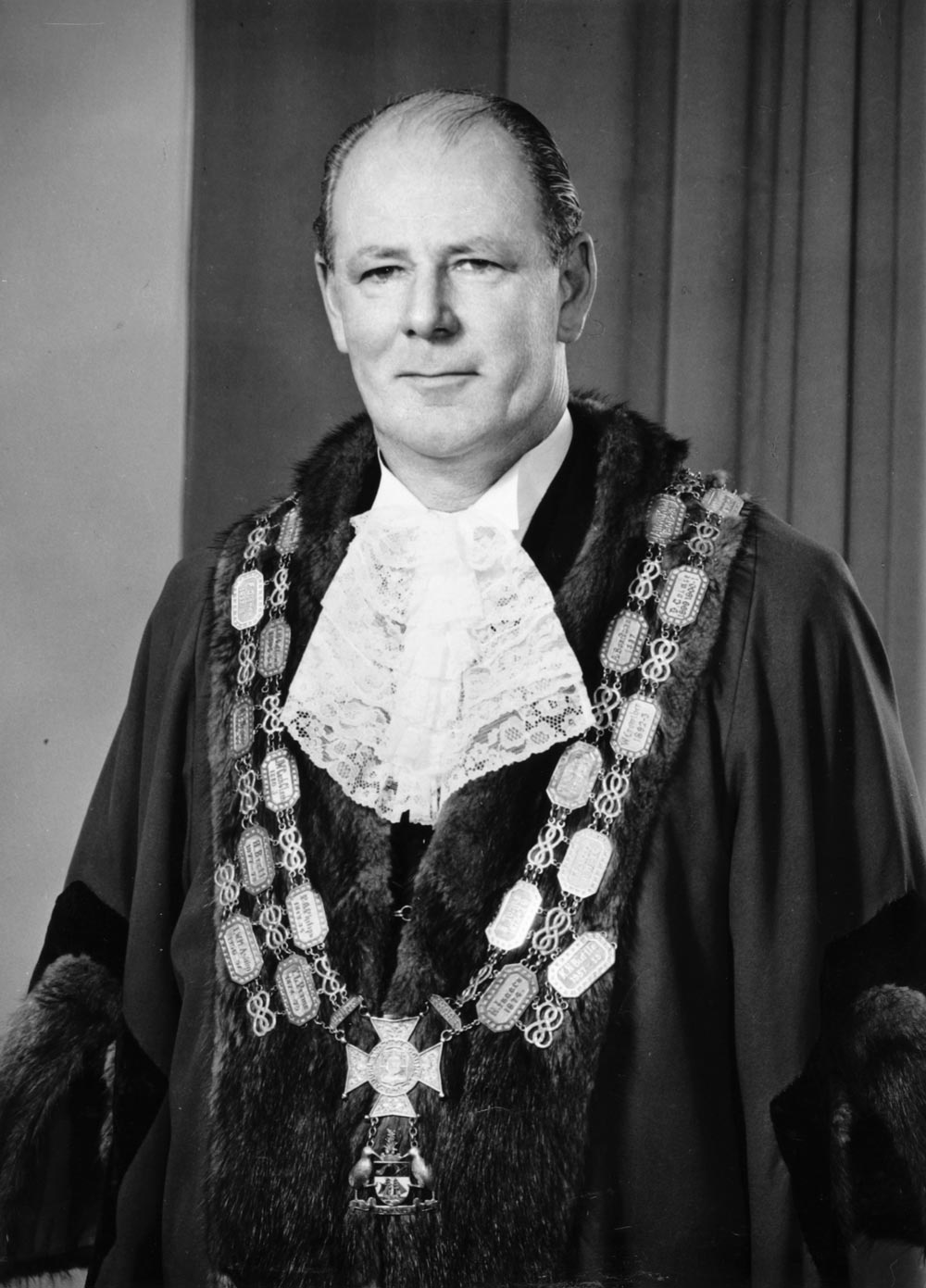

33rd Mayor of Auckland City
- In office 28 October 1965 – 23 October 1968
- Deputy: Fred Glasse
- Preceded by: Dove-Myer Robinson
- Succeeded by: Dove-Myer Robinson

Personal details
- Born: Roy Granville McElroy; 2 April 1907 Auckland, New Zealand
- Died: 16 May 1994 (aged 87) Auckland, New Zealand
- Party: National
- Spouse(s): Margaret Lillian Pountney (m. 1936; div. 1943) Joan Holm Biss (d. 1983); Betty Joan Boyd MacGregor

Roy Granville McElroy CMG (2 April 1907 – 16 May 1994) was a New Zealand lawyer and politician, who served as mayor of Auckland City from 1965 to 1968.

== Early life and career ==
Born in Auckland on 2 April 1907, McElroy was the son of Herbert Thomas Granville McElroy and Frances Catherine McElroy (née Hampton). He was educated at Thames High School and Auckland Grammar School, and went on to study at Auckland University College from 1924. He gained a Bachelor of Laws in 1928, and a Master of Laws with second-class honours in 1929. He worked as a law clerk in Auckland, and in 1932 was awarded a postgraduate scholarship in law by the University of New Zealand. He travelled to Britain and completed a PhD in law at the University of Cambridge in 1934. He was conferred the degree of Doctor of Laws by the University of New Zealand in 1935.

On 3 December 1936, McElroy married Margaret Lillian Pountney, but they divorced in December 1943. He later married Joan Holm Blackie (née Biss), and, following the latter's death, Betty Joan Boyd MacGregor.

McElroy later became a partner in the Auckland law firm of McElroy, Duncan and Preddle. During World War II, he served with the 2nd New Zealand Expeditionary Force from 1940 to 1944, rising to become a captain in 14 Light Anti-Aircraft Regiment.

== Political career ==
McElroy was an Auckland City Councillor for 15 years from 1938 to 1953, when he was deselected by the Citizens and Ratepayers association (C&R). Later, in 1965, he was chosen as the C&R candidate to run against the popular incumbent Mayor Dove-Myer Robinson. He won in 1965 by 1134 votes, but in the next election in 1968, Robinson defeated him by 6000 votes. As both councillor and mayor, he supported housing and urban renewal.

McElroy was the National Party candidate for the Roskill electorate in 1943 and 1946. He was to stand in Roskill in the cancelled 1941 election.

He later served as the Honorary Consular Agent of France from 1948 to 1972 and was awarded the Chevalier of the Légion d’honneur by the French president, Georges Pompidou, in 1970. In the 1972 New Year Honours, McElroy was appointed a Companion of the Order of St Michael and St George, for services to the community.

== Death ==
McElroy died in Auckland on 16 May 1994, and his ashes were buried at Purewa Cemetery.

Political offices
Preceded by Dove-Myer Robinson	Mayor of Auckland City; 1965–1968	Succeeded by Dove-Myer Robinson
