= John Allum =

New Zealand businessman and engineer

Sir John Allum CBE CStJ
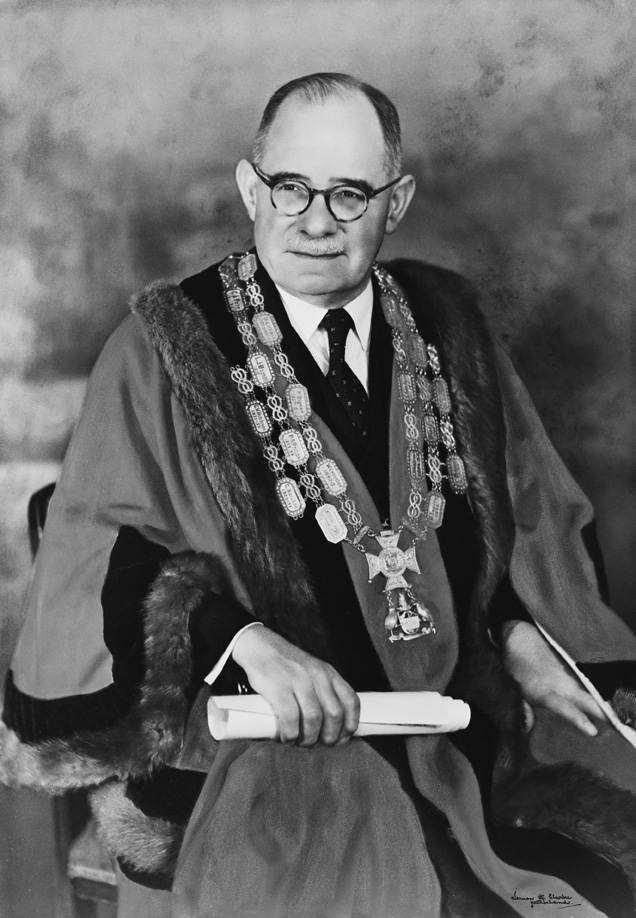

28th Mayor of Auckland City
- In office 28 May 1941 – 26 November 1953
- Deputy: Leonard Coakley (1941–50); Arthur Bailey (1950–52); Roy McElroy (1952–53)
- Preceded by: Ernest Davis
- Succeeded by: John Luxford

8th Deputy Mayor of Auckland City
- In office 30 June 1938 – 28 May 1941
- Mayor: Ernest Davis
- Preceded by: George Richardson
- Succeeded by: Leonard Coakley

Personal details
- Born: John Andrew Charles Allum; 27 January 1889 London, England
- Died: 16 September 1972 (aged 83) Takapuna, New Zealand
- Party: Reform; National
- Spouse: Annie Attwood
- Children: 3
- Relatives: Rose Allum (daughter)

Sir John Andrew Charles Allum CBE CStJ (27 January 1889 – 16 September 1972) was a New Zealand businessman and engineer, and was Mayor of Auckland City from 1941 to 1953.

== Biography ==
=== Early life and career ===
Allum was born in London and educated at Goldsmiths College. He became a clerk and on 5 March 1908, he married Annie Attwood at Lewisham, and they emigrated to New Zealand the following year. He settled in Auckland briefly before working in Dunedin for four years before returning to Auckland in 1914. His stay was intended to be temporary, but he ended up living there the rest of his life. Allum was elected to the council of the Auckland Chamber of Commerce in 1919.

An electrical engineer, Allum founded Allum Electrical in Auckland in 1922. He was the managing director of the company for many decades until his son Robert took over.

=== Political career ===
He was a member of the Auckland City Council from 1920 to 1929 when he was defeated. He was defeated again in 1931 trying to reclaim a council seat. He then contested the 1931 election in the Auckland West electorate for the Reform Party. That year, there was a coalition between the Reform and United Parties, and both Allum and Hugh Ross Mackenzie for United claimed to be the official coalition candidate. In the end, Mackenzie was the official candidate, and Allum came third, with the electorate being won by the Prime Minister, Michael Joseph Savage.

He then served a second term on the city council from 1938 to 1941 when he was also deputy mayor. He was on other local bodies (Transport Board, Drainage Board, Harbour Bridge Authority etc.) and associations, e.g. the New Zealand Employers Federation of which he was twice president and cultural organisations for ballet and opera.

He was elected as Mayor of Auckland City at the 1941 mayoral election. Allum is known as the person who championed the Auckland Harbour Bridge, sometimes referred to as Jack Allum's Bridge. He became the inaugural chairman of the Auckland Harbour Bridge Authority in 1950 and only relinquished this role in 1971 at the age of 82. Due to the power and influence he had at the head of multiple Auckland bodies Allum was known derisively by Members of Parliament as the nickname "His Imperial Highness".

As chair of the Drainage Board he was the proponent of a sewage dumping scheme (known as the Browns Island plan) that proposed to discharge untreated effluent into Waitemata Harbour. Allum was vehemently opposed by the Auckland and Suburban Drainage League over his sewerage scheme. He dismissed their leader Dove-Myer Robinson as a "noisy crank" which was a political mistake. Robinson backed John Luxford in his challenge to Allum at the 1953 mayoral election. Allum was defeated and became the first incumbent in Auckland that century who failed to secure re-election.

After losing the mayoralty Allum was pressured to accept the National Party nomination for the new parliamentary seat of Waitemata ahead of the 1954 election, but he declined.

=== Death ===
Allum died in Takapuna on 16 September 1972, and his body was cremated at the Purewa Crematorium.

== Honours ==
In 1935, Allum was awarded the King George V Silver Jubilee Medal. He was appointed a Commander of the Order of the British Empire for patriotic and social welfare services in the 1946 New Year Honours, and a Knight Bachelor in the 1950 King's Birthday Honours. In 1950 he was also appointed a Commander of the Order of St John. In 1953, he was awarded the Queen Elizabeth II Coronation Medal.

In the 1946 New Year Honours, Annie Allum was appointed a Member of the Order of the British Empire, for services in connection with women's patriotic activities, and in 1953 she was awarded the Queen Elizabeth II Coronation Medal.

== Notes ==
Political offices
Preceded by Ernest Davis	Mayor of Auckland City; 1941–1953	Succeeded by John Luxford
Preceded by George Richardson	Deputy Mayor of Auckland City; 1938–1941	Succeeded by Leonard Coakley
