= Dove-Myer Robinson =

New Zealand mayor

Sir Dove-Myer Robinson
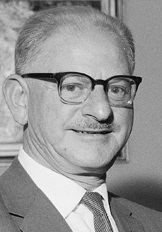

32nd Mayor of Auckland City
- In office 8 December 1959 – 28 October 1965
- Deputy: See list: Fred Ambler (1959–62); Fred Glasse (1962–65)
- Preceded by: Keith Buttle
- Succeeded by: Roy McElroy
- In office 23 October 1968 – 30 October 1980
- Deputy: See list: Fred Glasse (1968–70); Max Tounge (1970–71); Lindo Ferguson (1971–77); Jolyon Firth (1977–80)
- Preceded by: Roy McElroy
- Succeeded by: Colin Kay

1st Chair of the Auckland Regional Authority
- In office 1 November 1963 – 9 October 1965
- Preceded by: Position established
- Succeeded by: Hugh Lambie

Personal details
- Born: 15 June 1901 Sheffield, England
- Died: 14 August 1989 (aged 88) Auckland, New Zealand
- Party: Independent
- Other political affiliations: United Independents (1953–1959)
- Relations: Dame Barbara Goodman (niece); Saul Goldsmith (cousin); Ann Robinson (daughter)
- Children: 6

Sir Dove-Myer Robinson (15 June 1901 – 14 August 1989) was Mayor of Auckland City from 1959 to 1965 and from 1968 to 1980. Holding office for 6,543 days in total (17 years, 10 months, and 30 days), his was the longest tenure of any holder of the office. He was a colourful character and became affectionately known across New Zealand as "Robbie". He was one of several Jewish mayors of Auckland, although he rejected Judaism as a teenager and became a lifelong atheist. He has been described as a "slight, bespectacled man whose tiny stature was offset by a booming voice and massive ego".

== Biography ==
=== Early life and career ===
Born Mayer Dove Robinson in Sheffield, England, he was the sixth of seven children of Ida Brown and Moss Robinson. While his father described himself as a master jeweller, he actually sold trinkets and second-hand furniture, and the family was poor and often on the move. Robinson's mother influenced his upbringing by transmitting the strict values her rabbi father had taught her. His Jewish heritage ensured that he was often targeted by antisemitic violence in the schools he attended. The family moved to New Zealand in 1914, where his father worked as a pawnbroker. Dove-Myer, as he later called himself (ignoring his Robinson family name), found New Zealand agreeable and lacking in the intermittent persecutions he had previously faced.

Robinson began working as a travelling salesman, selling motorcycles. In Gore he met Adelaide (Adele) Elizabeth Matthews, the first of his four wives and on 12 September 1924 the two married, having two daughters. The pair divorced in 1932. He established Robinson's Motor Cycle and Bicycle Depot in 1930, but the business struggled as a result of the Great Depression, expanding to include cars. He married Veda Alice Davis, a 17-year-old, on 7 December 1937. The marriage only lasted a month and in 1940 they divorced. Robinson had begun living with Bettine (Betty) Williams, a seamstress, and on 15 March 1941 they married and had two daughters and one son. He raced motorcycles as well as selling them and for a time he was a sidecar racing champion. He held the World 500cc Speedway title in 1936. His racing injuries (and impaired eyesight) excused him from military service in World War II. During and after the war he and Betty focused on creating their own company, Childswear Ltd, into a prosperous clothes manufacturing business. In 1958 he campaigned against fluoridation of the public water supply, making a submission to Dunedin City Council on this, and led the anti-fluoridation movement in Auckland.

=== Political activism ===
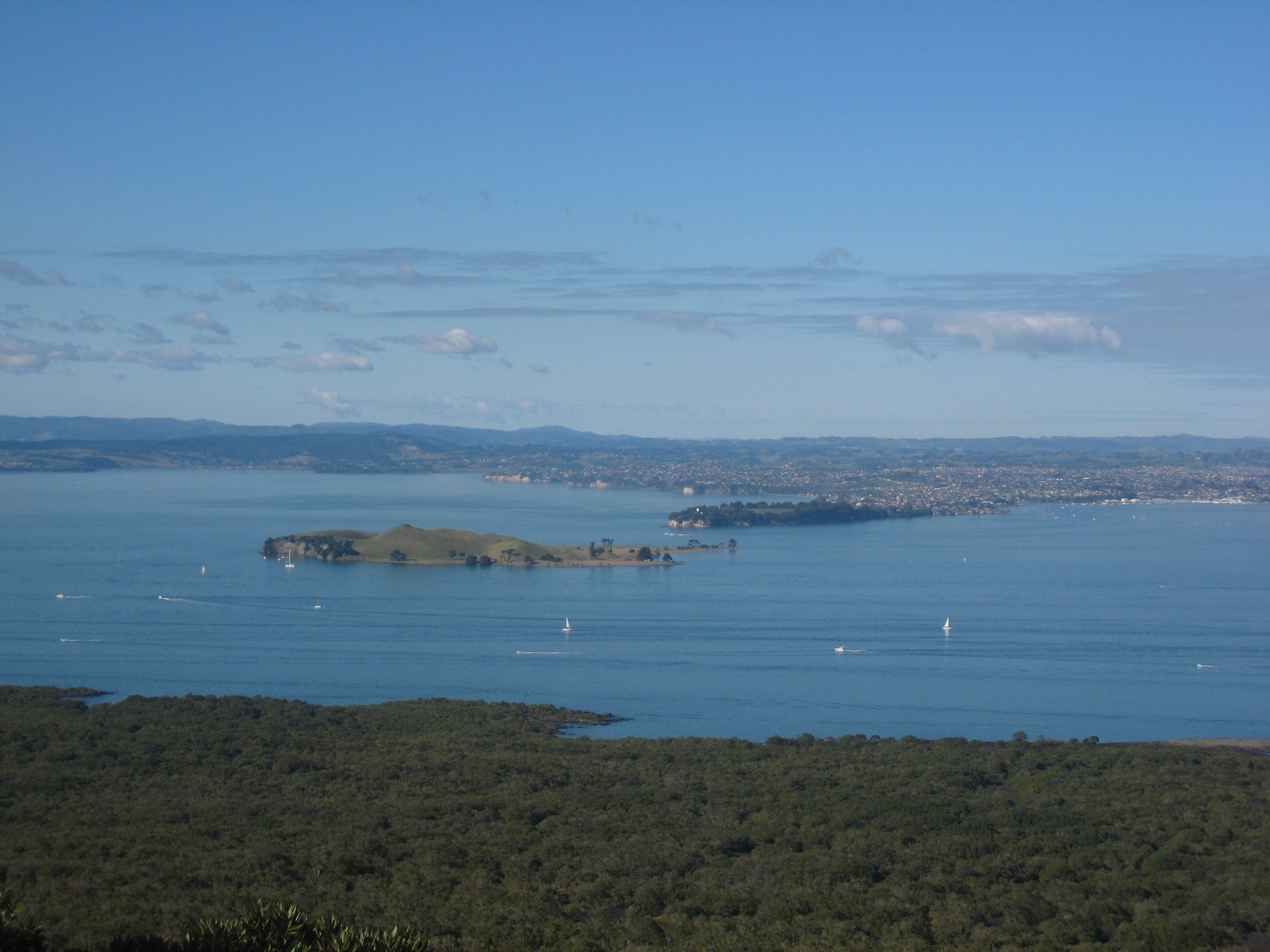
Browns Island, the location of the sewage scheme Robinson opposed

Robinson entered politics in the late 1940s when he led the opposition to a sewage dumping scheme championed by Auckland Mayor Sir John Allum (the Browns Island plan) that would have discharged untreated effluent into Waitemata Harbour. Robinson joined the Auckland and Suburban Drainage League, a group opposed to the idea of disposing Auckland's sewage and slaughterhouse waste into the harbour and intent on finding an alternative. Robinson's first attempt saw him take a petition containing 43,000 signatures to Parliament to try to convince the government to block the plan, but was unsuccessful.

Allum dismissed Robinson labeling him as a "noisy crank" and disliked the challenge to his authority. Graham Bush, an Auckland historian, later termed the clash between Allum and Robinson as one "between two men of steely character who ... deserve being ranked among the half-dozen greatest men in Auckland municipal history".

When a vacancy occurred on the Auckland City Council in 1952 Robinson stood as an independent candidate in the subsequent by-election. He used the publicity he had gained in his fight against Browns Island to stand out from the crowd and won the election. It was the first victory for an independent candidate in an Auckland City election since 1935. Now as a council member he was appointed as a council representative on the Auckland Drainage Board, the body proposing the Browns Island plan, and opposed it from within.

To try to break the deadlock, Robinson formed a new political party, the United Independents, and at the 1953 elections the new group won five seats (including Robinson) giving them the balance of power between the Citizens & Ratepayers and Labour Party tickets. They also endorsed the candidacy for mayor of John Luxford, who defeated Allum. With Allum removed from the council (and by extension the Drainage Board), Robinson assumed chairmanship of the Drainage Board. There, he proposed and eventually realised a scheme to break down the sewage in oxidation ponds ('Robbie's ponds') near the Manukau Harbour. Browns Island instead became a public reserve. His success in the scheme earned Robinson a reputation as a visionary later on helped him gain the popularity to be elected Mayor of Auckland City.

Robinson had established a public profile during his lengthy political struggle against the Browns Island plan, but it took a toll on his private life. His third marriage ended and he divorced Betty in 1959. On 15 June that same year he married Thelma Thompson, an executive at Childswear Ltd, with whom he had one daughter.

=== Mayor of Auckland City ===
==== First term as mayor ====
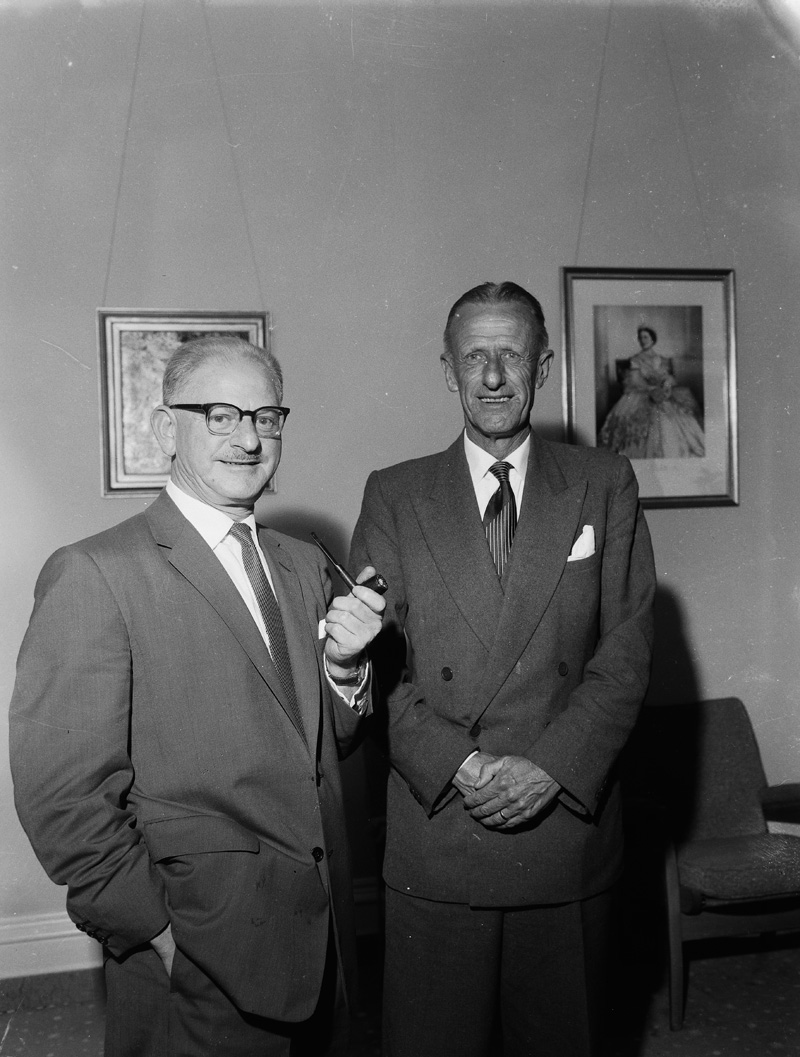
Robinson (left) and Buttle following the 1959 election

In 1959, campaigning on a populist platform as "Robbie" he defeated the incumbent Citizens & Ratepayers mayor Keith Buttle which caused much resentment. A hallmark of Robinson's first two terms as mayor was the perpetual animosity between himself and the Citizens & Ratepayers councillors, who despised Robinson's popularity, working-class origins and social conduct. Robinson was also infamously known for walking from his home in Remuera to work at the town hall shirtless, often media cameras in tow.

Robinson's main drive in his first period as mayor was a proposed merging of the 32 separate city, borough and county councils in greater Auckland into a regional authority that could collectively decide on issues of regional importance. He won over smaller councils (who mostly opposed the reforms) and exploited Parliamentary recommendations for compulsory council amalgamations to forge the issue ahead successfully on condition that the existing councils were left intact. After being re-elected in 1962, the Auckland Regional Authority (ARA) was established in 1963 and Robinson was chosen as its founding chairman.

Robinson described 1965 as his annus horribilis. He had a very public break-up with his fourth wife Thelma (who only wanted two terms as mayoress), he lost the 1965 mayoral election by 1,134 votes to Citizens & Ratepayers candidate Roy McElroy and despite being re-elected to the ARA, he was denied any chairman responsibilities. He endured a three-year political hiatus and was now a single parent.

==== Second term as mayor ====
In 1968 he in turn defeated McElroy by 5,972 votes becoming the first Mayor of Auckland to serve non-consecutive terms. His niece, Barbara Goodman, became his mayoress for the rest of his time as mayor. He cultivated a more constructive relationship with the newer Citizens & Ratepayers councillors, most of whom were uninvolved in the feuding of previous council terms and more appreciative of Robinson's role in the Browns Island affair. He was again returned to the ARA where he was appointed to the transit committee.

Robinson's main focus during his second period as mayor was his advocacy for rapid transit system for Auckland. Robinson's proposal for a bus-rail rapid transit plan was "to provide fast, modern electrified railways through the main traffic corridors of the region". The proposal had passenger trains every three minutes running from an underground subway terminal in the city centre with above ground tracks leading to Howick, Auckland Airport and a tunnel to the North Shore. The scheme was heavily criticised for its cost (an estimated $273 million in 1973) and both the ARA chairman Tom Pearce and most of its members opposed the scheme. The Third Labour Government reneged on an election pledge to pay for the scheme and the rapid rail proposal disappeared. Retrospectively, Robinson's idea to implement rapid rail was seen as a possible long-term solution to Auckland's subsequent transportation difficulties. The phrase; "If we'd only listened to Robbie..." has become common speech in Auckland whenever the city's transport system is debated.

During his career, Robinson also became involved in the incipient movement of Green politics, particularly the anti-nuclear movement, and supported the Third Labour Government's opposition to French nuclear testing in the Pacific. He was appointed a Knight Bachelor in the 1970 Queen's Birthday Honours, for outstanding services as mayor of Auckland. Robinson's influence declined in the 1970s and after his 1977 election victory he promised not to run again. However, he recanted and stood again in 1980, but his age was against him and he lost to Colin Kay.

=== Later life and death ===
Robinson was loath to retire and twice attempted to re-enter politics. He stood for mayor again in 1983 but finished a distant fourth. At the 1986 local-body elections he was a candidate for a council seat in the Remuera ward but was unsuccessful.

Strained relationships with most of his children caused his unintentional retirement to be a lonely one. His niece, Dame Barbara Goodman told papers on his death "I think he did much better in his relationship with the public than in his private relationships". Robinson lived out his remaining years in a retirement village in Auckland until his death on 14 August 1989, survived by his six children. A civic funeral was held for him at the Auckland Town Hall with a secular service led by Reverend Selwyn Dawson (a former councillor).

== Legacy ==
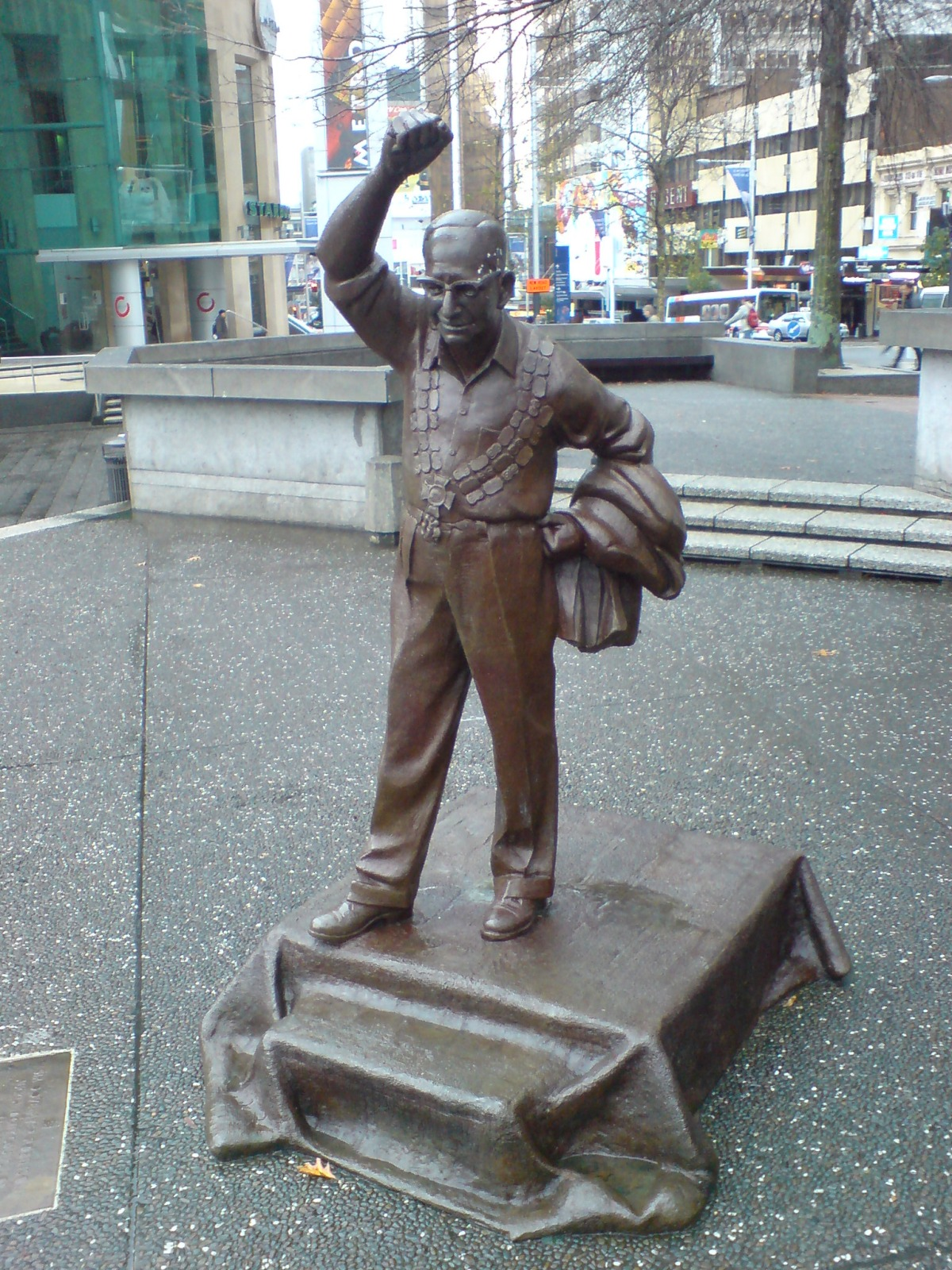
Statue of Sir Dove-Myer Robinson in Aotea Square, Auckland

Robinson has been described as one of New Zealand's most popular and colourful politicians, politically independent, rationalist, environmentalist and alternative medicine advocate. In 1983 John Roberts, a professor of Political Studies, commented on Robinson's charisma:

There are four charismatic politicians in our history. There is Richard John Seddon, Michael Joseph Savage, Robert David Muldoon and Dove-Myer Robinson. And while the others had party structures behind them, and they built on the successes of other men, Robbie seems to me to owe nothing to anyone but himself, he’s a unique phenomenon.

Dame Barbara Goodman, former Auckland Mayoress and councillor, was his niece, and spearheaded a campaign for the Auckland City Council to build a statue of him in Aotea Square; the statue was completed in 2002. Dove Myer Robinson Park, formerly the Parnell Rose Gardens, was named after him. The park was where previous mayor John Logan Campbell once lived.

== See also ==
- United Independents

== Notes ==
Political offices
Preceded by Roy McElroy	Mayor of Auckland City; 1968–1980; 1959–1965	Succeeded by Colin Kay
Preceded by Keith Buttle	Mayor of Auckland City; 1968–1980; 1959–1965	Succeeded by Roy McElroy
New office	Chair of the Auckland Regional Authority; 1963–1965	Succeeded by Hugh Lambie
