= Rita Smith =

New Zealand communist and political activist

Lillian Rita Smith (née Hampton, 9 May 1912 – 7 June 1993) was a notable New Zealand communist and political activist.

She was born in Perth, Western Australia, Australia in 1912. Her parents, Ann Bawden Moses and Henry Hampton, had married in Auckland in 1898 before their emigration to Australia. Hampton had four sisters and two brothers; she was the second-youngest of them. Trained as a nurse, she worked as a parlour maid for a wealthy family during the Great Depression. This opened her eyes to "the contradictions of capitalism", and she joined the Communist Party of Australia in 1936.

In December 1935, she married Ted Smith in Kellerberrin, Western Australia, and they had one son. They moved to Auckland in 1941 and joined the Communist Party of New Zealand. She was on the party's national committee for nearly fifty years, and worked full-time for the party for two decades. Over the years, she stood at local and national elections at numerous occasions. She first stood in a general election in 1949, when she contested the Parnell electorate and came a distant third.

Smith remained politically active all her life. When one ward of Starship Hospital was occupied by protesters in November 1992, Smith was one of the people arrested; she was 80 at the time. The speech she gave at her trial about public health cuts was described as "brilliant".

Smith died on 7 June 1993 at Auckland City Hospital. Her husband had died in 1986. They were survived by their son.
