= Mayor of Auckland City =

Mayor of Auckland City Council
- Coat of arms of Auckland City
- Style: His/Her Worship
- Term length: Three years, renewable
- Inaugural holder: Philip Philips
- Formation: 1871
- Final holder: John Banks
- Abolished: 2010
- Superseded by: Mayor of Auckland

The Mayor of Auckland City was the directly elected head of the Auckland City Council, the municipal government of Auckland City, New Zealand. The office existed from 1871 to 2010, when the Auckland City Council and mayoralty was abolished and replaced with the Auckland Council and the Mayor of Auckland.

== History ==
Auckland obtained its first local government in 1851, when the Borough of Auckland was created, covering an area of 58,000 acres (230 km^{2}). This short-lived entity, which existed for about one year, had only one mayor, Archibald Clark.

When the City of Auckland was formally incorporated in 1871, it covered a much smaller area of 623 acres (2.52 km^{2}). Its municipal council was led by a chairman, Walter Lee. Soon afterwards the office of Mayor of Auckland was created. At first, the mayor was elected by the councillors. In 1875, Benjamin Tonks was the first mayor elected at large, i.e. by the ratepayers. There were 39 holders of the position. The longest-serving was Sir Dove-Myer Robinson, who held the post for 18 years, and was the first person to serve non-consecutive terms. There were two female Mayors; Catherine Tizard in 1983 and Christine Fletcher in 1998.

The city council was abolished on 31 October 2010. The area has since been governed by the Auckland Council, which also governs the rest of the Auckland Region.

== List of mayors of Auckland City ==
Key

Independent Citizens & Ratepayers Labour

†: Died in office

#	Portrait	Name	Term of Office	
1		Philip Philips	22 May 1871	9 July 1874
2		Henry Isaacs	20 July 1874	16 December 1874
3		Frederick Prime	16 December 1874	16 December 1875
4		Benjamin Tonks	16 December 1875	20 December 1876
5		William Hurst	20 December 1876	19 December 1877
6		Henry Brett	19 December 1877	27 November 1878
7		Thomas Peacock	27 November 1878	15 December 1880
8		James Clark	15 December 1880	20 December 1883
9		William Waddel	20 December 1883	23 December 1886
10		Albert Devore	23 December 1886	18 December 1889
11		John Upton	18 December 1889	18 December 1891
12		William Crowther	18 December 1891	20 December 1893
13		James Job Holland	20 December 1893	16 December 1896
14		Abraham Boardman	16 December 1896	11 May 1897
15		Peter Dignan	11 May 1897	21 December 1898
16		David Goldie	21 December 1898	8 May 1901
17		John Logan Campbell	8 May 1901	25 July 1901
18		Alfred Kidd	30 July 1901	13 May 1903
19		Edwin Mitchelson	13 May 1903	3 May 1905
20		Arthur Myers	3 May 1905	25 February 1909
21		Charles Grey	2 March 1909	4 May 1910
22		Lemuel Bagnall	4 May 1910	3 May 1911
23		James Parr	3 May 1911	5 May 1915
24		James Gunson	5 May 1915	6 May 1925
25		George Baildon	6 May 1925	13 May 1931
26		George Hutchison	13 May 1931	15 May 1935
27		Ernest Davis	15 May 1935	28 May 1941
28		John Allum	28 May 1941	26 November 1953
29		John Luxford	26 November 1953	3 December 1956
30		Tom Ashby	3 December 1956	26 September 1957†
31		Keith Buttle	11 November 1957	8 December 1959
32		Dove-Myer Robinson	8 December 1959	28 October 1965
33		Roy McElroy	28 October 1965	23 October 1968
(32)		Dove-Myer Robinson	23 October 1968	30 October 1980
34		Colin Kay	30 October 1980	26 October 1983
35		Catherine Tizard	26 October 1983	28 September 1990
36		Les Mills	21 December 1990	4 November 1998
37		Christine Fletcher	4 November 1998	1 November 2001
38		John Banks	1 November 2001	31 October 2004
39		Dick Hubbard	31 October 2004	1 November 2007
(38)		John Banks	1 November 2007	31 October 2010

=== List of deputy-mayors ===
Key

Independent Citizens & Ratepayers Labour City Vision

†: Died in office

Name	Term of Office		Mayor
John Court	1913	1915	Parr
Andrew Entrican	1915	1920	Gunson
Harold D. Heather	1920	1922†	Gunson
George Baildon	1922	1925	Gunson
James A. Warnock	1925	1927	Baildon
Andrew Entrican	1927	1935	Baildon
Andrew Entrican	1927	1935	Hutchison
Bernard Martin	1935	1938	Davis
George Richardson	1938†		Davis
John Allum	1938	1941	Davis
Leonard Coakley	1941	1950	Allum
Arthur Bailey	1950	1952†	Allum
Roy McElroy	1952	1953	Allum
Keith Buttle	1953	1957	Luxford
Keith Buttle	1953	1957	Ashby
Fred Ambler	1957	1962	Buttle
Fred Ambler	1957	1962	Robinson
Fred Glasse	1962	1970	Robinson
Fred Glasse	1962	1970	McElroy
Fred Glasse	1962	1970	Robinson
Max Tounge	1970	1971	Robinson
Lindo Ferguson	1971	1977	Robinson
Jolyon Firth	1977	1980	Robinson
John Strevens	1980	1986	Kay
John Strevens	1980	1986	Tizard
Harold Goodman	1986	1988†	Tizard
Phil Warren	1988	1991	Tizard
Phil Warren	1988	1991	Mills
David Hay	1991	1998	Mills
Bruce Hucker	1998	2001	Fletcher
David Hay	2001	2004	Banks
Bruce Hucker	2004	2007	Hubbard
David Hay	2007	2010	Banks
