= Keith Buttle =

New Zealand businessman and politician

Keith Buttle CBE
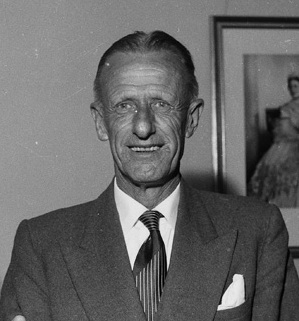

31st Mayor of Auckland City
- In office 11 November 1957 – 8 December 1959
- Deputy: Fred Ambler
- Preceded by: Tom Ashby
- Succeeded by: Dove-Myer Robinson

Personal details
- Born: 23 December 1900 Auckland, New Zealand
- Died: 15 December 1973 (aged 72) Auckland, New Zealand
- Spouse: Una Agnes Buttle
- Profession: Sharebroker

Keith Nicholson Buttle CBE (23 November 1900 – 15 December 1973) was a New Zealand businessman and politician. He served as mayor of Auckland City from 1957 to 1959.

== Biography ==
Born 23 November 1900 in Auckland, Buttle attended Auckland Grammar School. On 23 March 1927, he married Una Agnes Parkinson at the Pitt Street Church in Auckland. He was a sharebroker and partner in an Auckland firm of sharebrokers. He served on the Auckland City Council for 18 years, the Auckland Harbour Board for five years, and the Auckland Harbour Bridge Authority for three years.

Buttle was elected mayor of Auckland City, replacing Tom Ashby in a by-election in November 1957 after Ashby died partway through his term. In the 1961 New Year Honours, Buttle was appointed a Commander of the Order of the British Empire, in recognition of his service as Auckland mayor.

Buttle died on 15 December 1973, and he was buried at Purewa Cemetery.

Political offices
Preceded by Tom Ashby	Mayor of Auckland City; 1957–1959	Succeeded by Dove-Myer Robinson
Preceded by Roy McElroy	Deputy Mayor of Auckland; 1953–1957	Succeeded by Fred Ambler
