= Communities and Residents =

Communities & Residents
- President: David Hay
- Founded: 1938
- Political position: Centre-Right
- Colours: Blue
- Auckland Council: 1 / 20
- Local Boards: 23 / 149
- Entrust trustees: 5 / 5

Communities and Residents (C&R) is a right-leaning local body ticket in Auckland, New Zealand. It was formed in 1938 as Citizens & Ratepayers, with a view to controlling the Auckland City Council and preventing left-leaning Labour Party control. It controlled the council most of the time from World War II until the council was merged into the Auckland Council in 2010. It changed its name from "Citizens & Ratepayers" to "Communities and Residents" in 2012.

== Background ==
The Citizens & Ratepayers Association was formed in 1938. It was formed with the intention to "secure the return of the best possible types of candidate to the Auckland City Council, Harbour Board, Hospital Board and Electric Power Board". It also intended to "preserve local government in all its then present forms, protecting it from any influence and interference of party politics".

C&R has long been aligned with the National Party, which traditionally does not field its own candidates in Auckland local body elections, unlike the Labour Party and the Green Party.

== History ==
=== 2010–present ===
==== 2010–2013 term ====
The group changed their name to "Communities & Residents" in 2012, following a review of the organisation's performance at the 2010 election. Other changes adopted after the review included abandoning the "whipping" system used in voting on council issues.

==== 2022 election ====
C&R endorsed former Chief Executive of Heart of the City Viv Beck for the Auckland mayoralty, and would succeed in increasing its share of Auckland local board members and Licensing Trustees.

==== 2022–2025 term ====
In 2025, it was revealed that Deputy Mayor Desley Simpson had resigned from C&R, leaving Christine Fletcher as the group's only councillor.

==== 2025 election ====
At the 2025 election, the group saw Christine Fletcher re-elected to council for the Albert-Eden-Puketāpapa ward and they won control of the Albert-Eden-Puketāpapa, Maungakiekie-Tāmaki and Ōrākei local boards. The group lost two local board seats and no longer controlled the Mount Wellington Licensing Trust.

== List of representatives ==
=== 2022–2025 term ===
Communities and Residents elected members for the 2022–2025 term included:

Ward	Name	Photo
Albert-Eden-Puketāpapa	Christine Fletcher	
Ōrākei	Desley Simpson (until late 2023)	
Local board	Subdivision	Name
Albert-Eden (split control)	Mangawhau	Kendyl Smith
Albert-Eden (split control)	Mangawhau	Jack Tan
Albert-Eden (split control)	Mangawhau	José Fowler
Albert-Eden (split control)	Mangawhau	Rex Smith
Devonport-Takapuna (in minority)		George Wood
Devonport-Takapuna (in minority)		Gavin Busch
Howick (in minority)	Pakuranga	Katrina Bungard
Howick (in minority)	Pakuranga	David Collings
Maungakiekie-Tāmaki (in minority)	Maungakiekie	Dan Allan
Maungakiekie-Tāmaki (in minority)	Maungakiekie	Debbie Burrows
Maungakiekie-Tāmaki (in minority)	Maungakiekie	Tony Woodcock
Ōrākei (in majority)		Troy Churton
Ōrākei (in majority)		David Wong
Ōrākei (in majority)		Scott Milne
Ōrākei (in majority)		Penny Tucker
Ōrākei (in majority)		Sarah Powrie
Ōrākei (in majority)		Margaret Voyce
Ōrākei (in majority)		Angus McPhee
Puketāpapa (in majority)		Ella Kumar
Puketāpapa (in majority)		Roseanne Hay
Puketāpapa (in majority)		Fiona Lai
Puketāpapa (in majority)		Mark Pervan
Waitematā (in majority)		Sarah Trotman
Waitematā (in majority)		Genevieve Sage
Waitematā (in majority)		Allan Matson
Waitematā (in majority)		Greg Moyle
Licensing trust	Ward	Name
Mount Wellington (in majority)		Tania Batucan
Mount Wellington (in majority)		Troy Elliot
Mount Wellington (in majority)		Tabetha Elliot
Mount Wellington (in majority)		Michael Pepper

== Summary of election results ==
Election	Candidates nominated				Seats won			
Election	Council candidates	Local/Community board candidates	Health board candidates	Licensing trust candidates	Council seats	Local/Community board seats	Health board seats	Licensing trust seats
2001	18/19	33/52	7/7	0/9	9 / 19	15 / 52	3 / 7	0 / 9
2004 (Note: "Election results Final official election results 2004". aucklandcity.govt.nz. 2004. Archived from the original on 20 October 2008.)	17/19	32/47	7/7	4/9	6 / 19	9 / 47	3 / 7	1 / 9
2007 (Note: "Election results Final official election results 2007". aucklandcity.govt.nz. 2007. Archived from the original on 15 October 2008.)	16/19	26/52	5/7	2/9	11 / 19	19 / 52	2 / 7	1 / 9
2010	14/20	82/149	16/21	7/41	5 / 20	31 / 149	7 / 21	3 / 41
2013	4/20	19/149	8/21	0/35	3 / 20	12 / 149	4 / 21	0 / 35
2016	3/20	21/149	5/21	0/35	2 / 20	11 / 149	2 / 21	0 / 35
2019	6/20	49/149	14/21	3/35	3 / 20	21 / 149	4 / 21	1 / 35
2022	8/20	45/149	Abolished	5/35	2 / 20	26 / 149	Abolished	4 / 35
2025	3/20	47/151	N/A	6/35	1 / 20	24 / 151	N/A	2 / 35

=== Entrust trustee elections ===
C&R's record of tenure on Entrust seats for the elections since 2000.

Election	Candidates nominated	Seats won
Election	Trustee candidates	Trust seats
2003	5/5	4 / 5
2006	5/5	4 / 5
2009	5/5	5 / 5
2012	5/5	5 / 5
2015	5/5	5 / 5
2018	5/5	5 / 5
2021	5/5	5 / 5
2024 (Note: Final Result of the 2024 Entrust Trustee Election. Entrust NZ. Auckland Energy Consumer Trust.)	5/5	5 / 5
