= 1968 Auckland City mayoral election =

New Zealand mayoral election

← 1965	12 October 1968	1971 →
- Turnout: 32,128 (45.14%)
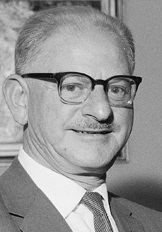

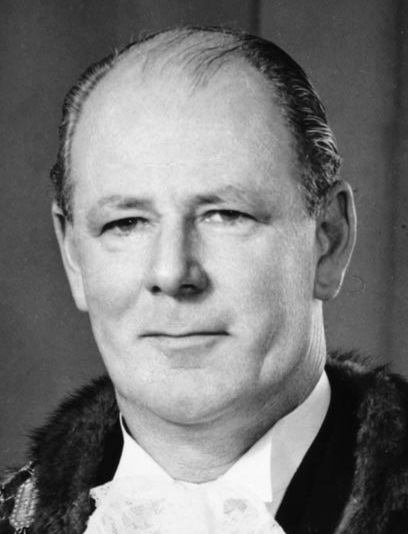
Candidate	Dove-Myer Robinson	Roy McElroy
Party	Independent	Citizens & Ratepayers
Popular vote	18,484	12,512
Percentage	57.53	38.94
Mayor before election
Roy McElroy
Elected mayor
Dove-Myer Robinson

The 1968 Auckland City mayoral election was part of the New Zealand local elections held that same year. In 1968, elections were held for the Mayor of Auckland plus other local government positions including twenty-one city councillors. The polling was conducted using the standard first-past-the-post electoral method.

== Background ==
Incumbent Mayor Roy McElroy of the Citizens & Ratepayers ticket was defeated by his predecessor Dove-Myer Robinson. Labour Party councillor George Forsyth ran again for a second time, however he was refused official party endorsement as Labour officials preferred Robinson as Mayor to McElroy and thought fielding their own candidate would allow McElroy to be re-elected on a split vote. Robinson's promise of a "rapid rail" system to ease Auckland's mounting traffic problems was a major talking point. A new ticket, the Civic Action Party was set up as an anti-rapid rail group, some of whose members were former local body politicians. Facing bitter opposition to his independent candidature Forsyth received half a dozen threatening telephone calls (who did not reveal their names) and even members of his family were abused whilst travelling publicly in buses. Forsyth said he was not worried about the callers but thought it was a "pretty poor state of affairs" that he could not offer himself as a candidate for public office in without encountering "Chicago-style opposition."

== Mayoralty results ==
1968 Auckland mayoral election
Party	Candidate	Votes	%	±%
Independent	Dove-Myer Robinson	18,484	57.53	+13.71
Citizens & Ratepayers	Roy McElroy	12,512	38.94	−7.99
Independent	George Forsyth	1,132	3.53	−5.72
Majority		5,972	18.58	
Turnout		32,128	45.14	−2.09

== Councillor results ==
1968 Auckland City Council election
Party	Candidate	Votes	%	±%
Citizens & Ratepayers	Eric Armishaw	20,817	64.79	+22.62
Citizens & Ratepayers	Arapeta Awatere	20,271	63.09	+2.08
Citizens & Ratepayers	Sir Keith Park	20,218	62.92	+3.48
Citizens & Ratepayers	Lincoln Laidlaw	19,208	59.78	
Citizens & Ratepayers	Winifred Delugar	19,071	59.35	+8.08
Citizens & Ratepayers	Fred Glasse	18,443	57.40	+1.28
Citizens & Ratepayers	Max Tongue	18,226	56.72	+5.61
Citizens & Ratepayers	John Dale	17,678	55.02	−1.58
Citizens & Ratepayers	Wint Holland	17,635	54.88	
Citizens & Ratepayers	Harold Watts	16,543	51.49	−0.97
Citizens & Ratepayers	Ian McKinnon	16,497	51.34	−5.87
Citizens & Ratepayers	Mel Tronson	15,652	48.71	−2.37
Citizens & Ratepayers	Eric Salmon	15,427	48.01	
Independent	Fred Ambler	15,164	47.19	+0.94
Citizens & Ratepayers	George Russell Tutt	14,583	45.39	−1.99
Citizens & Ratepayers	Lindo Ferguson	14,446	44.96	
Citizens & Ratepayers	Jolyon Firth	14,357	44.68	
Citizens & Ratepayers	Alan Alcorn	14,337	44.62	
Labour	Alex Dreaver	13,772	42.86	+5.91
Citizens & Ratepayers	Bill Clark	13,687	42.60	−6.13
Citizens & Ratepayers	Thomas Roy Sussex	13,374	41.62	−0.11
Civic Action	Allan Tattersfield	13,347	41.54	
Citizens & Ratepayers	Raymond George Watkins	12,778	39.77	
Civic Action	Ngapere Hopa	11,451	35.64	
Citizens & Ratepayers	Matt Te Hau	11,396	35.47	
Civic Action	Paul Cavanagh	11,393	35.46	
Labour	Graham Neil Caldwell	10,771	33.52	
Labour	Roy Turner	10,721	33.36	
Civic Action	Michael Hart	10,701	33.30	
Independent	George Forsyth	10,444	32.50	
Civic Action	Warwick Watts	10,302	32.06	
Civic Action	Charles Harris	10,002	31.13	
Labour	Thomas Price	9,479	29.50	+4.92
Civic Action	Terrence Way	9,085	28.27	
Labour	Richard Northey	8,228	25.61	
Labour	Edward Arthur Scott	7,688	23.92	
Independent	Albert Edward Bailey	7,620	23.71	
Civic Action	Ante Mate Katavich	7,380	22.97	
Civic Action	Joseph Stanley	6,993	21.76	
Labour	Graeme Philip Peters	6,846	21.30	
Civic Action	Herbert Romaniuk	6,716	20.90	
Civic Action	Nonu Lelaulu	6,441	20.04	
Socialist Unity	Rita Smith	4,937	15.36	
Socialist Unity	Bill Andersen	4,596	14.30	+5.70
Socialist Unity	George Jackson	4,443	13.82	
Socialist Unity	Alec Ostler	2,839	8.83	+4.23
