= 1971 Auckland City mayoral election =

← 1968	9 October 1971	1974 →
- Turnout: 30,343 (36.27%)
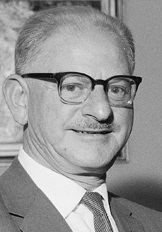

Candidate	Dove-Myer Robinson	Paul Wedderspoon
Party	Independent	Independent
Popular vote	27,417	1,521
Percentage	90.35	5.01
Mayor before election
Dove-Myer Robinson
Elected mayor
Dove-Myer Robinson

The 1971 Auckland City mayoral election was part of the New Zealand local elections held that same year. In 1971, elections were held for the Mayor of Auckland plus other local government positions including twenty-one city councillors. The polling was conducted using the standard first-past-the-post electoral method.

== Background ==
Incumbent Mayor Dove-Myer Robinson was re-elected with an overwhelming majority with an absence of a challenger from either the Citizens & Ratepayers Association's ticket or the Labour Party. Despite deciding to run full tickets for the city council and regional authority the Auckland regional council of the Labour Party resolved to support Robinson for mayor as it had in 1968 to prevent the possibility of a conservative mayor being elected. Despite opposing Robinson's rapid rail proposals the Civic Action Party did not contest the election against him. Robinson's closest polling opponent was Paul Wedderspoon a university student, who campaigned as an independent on a socialist platform.

== Mayoralty results ==
1971 Auckland mayoral election
Party	Candidate	Votes	%	±%
Independent	Dove-Myer Robinson	27,417	90.35	+32.82
Independent	Paul Wedderspoon	1,521	5.01	
Socialist Action	Michael Goodger	1,405	4.63	
Majority		25,896	85.34	
Turnout		30,343	36.27	−8.87

== Councillor results ==
1971 Auckland City Council election
Party	Candidate	Votes	%	±%
Citizens & Ratepayers	Lincoln Laidlaw	18,491	60.93	+1.15
Citizens & Ratepayers	Winifred Delugar	16,861	55.56	−3.79
Citizens & Ratepayers	Lindsay Adams	16,708	55.06	
Citizens & Ratepayers	Max Tongue	16,656	54.89	−1.83
Citizens & Ratepayers	Arthur Kinsella	16,404	54.06	
Citizens & Ratepayers	John Dale	16,262	53.59	−1.43
Citizens & Ratepayers	Eric Salmon	16,230	53.48	+5.47
Citizens & Ratepayers	Mel Tronson	15,963	52.60	+3.89
Citizens & Ratepayers	Harold Watts	15,896	52.38	+0.89
Citizens & Ratepayers	Wint Holland	15,690	51.70	+3.18
Citizens & Ratepayers	Harry Dansey	15,581	51.34	
Citizens & Ratepayers	Colin Kay	15,125	49.84	
Citizens & Ratepayers	Lindo Ferguson	15,007	49.45	+4.49
Citizens & Ratepayers	Jolyon Firth	14,807	48.79	+3.83
Citizens & Ratepayers	Ian McKinnon	14,575	48.03	−3.31
Citizens & Ratepayers	John Strevens	14,508	47.81	
Citizens & Ratepayers	Alan Alcorn	14,456	47.64	+3.02
Citizens & Ratepayers	Bill Clark	13,995	46.12	+1.50
Labour	Michael Bassett	13,769	45.37	
Labour	Catherine Tizard	13,682	45.09	
Labour	Alex Dreaver	13,428	44.25	+1.39
Citizens & Ratepayers	Roy Walker	13,331	43.93	
Citizens & Ratepayers	Peter Grayburn	13,058	43.03	
Citizens & Ratepayers	Ray La Varis	12,640	41.65	
Labour	Jim Anderton	11,292	37.21	
Independent	Fred Ambler	10,715	35.31	−11.88
Labour	Sue Kedgley	10,341	34.08	
Labour	Tom Paki	9,824	32.37	
Labour	Richard Northey	9,737	32.08	+6.47
Labour	Maureen Dorothy Gibbons	9,633	31.74	
Labour	Nancy Cocks	9,218	30.37	
Labour	John Currie	9,134	30.10	
Labour	Michael Roger Stenson	8,821	29.07	
Labour	Roderick Murray Carter	8,724	28.75	
Labour	Betty Wark	8,659	28.53	
Labour	Rata Shepherd	8,529	28.10	
Labour	Frederick Atiga	8,458	27.87	
Labour	Brian Robert Lythe	8,403	27.69	
Labour	Graeme Smith	7,843	25.84	
Labour	Marion McQuoid	7,453	24.56	
Labour	Donald Eric Wackrow	7,322	24.13	
Labour	David Pudney	7,165	23.61	
Labour	Leo Barry Smith	7,133	23.50	
Independent	David Dodds	6,885	22.69	
Independent	Paul Wedderspoon	4,939	16.27	
Socialist Unity	Bill Andersen	3,579	11.79	−2.51
Independent	Gary Gotlieb	3,392	11.17	
Socialist Unity	George Jackson	2,515	8.28	−5.54
Independent	Walter Hensley	2,110	6.95	
