= 1959 Auckland City mayoral election =

New Zealand mayoral election

← 1957	21 November 1959	1962 →
- Turnout: 37,161 (46.90%)
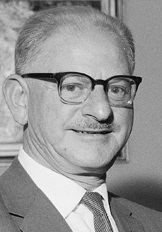

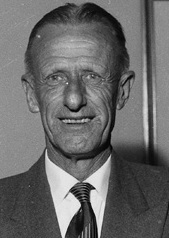
Candidate	Dove-Myer Robinson	Keith Buttle
Party	Independent	Citizens & Ratepayers
Popular vote	18,980	17,941
Percentage	51.07	48.27
Mayor before election
Keith Buttle
Elected mayor
Dove-Myer Robinson

The 1959 Auckland City mayoral election was part of the New Zealand local elections held that same year. In 1959, elections were held for the Mayor of Auckland plus other local government positions including twenty-one city councillors. The polling was conducted using the standard first-past-the-post electoral method.

== Background ==
High profile councillor Dove-Myer Robinson defeated incumbent Mayor Keith Buttle of the Citizens & Ratepayers ticket, who had not been opposed by Robinson and his United Independent colleagues in the 1957 contest. Campaigning as "Robbie", Robinson campaigned on an independent and populist platform. He charged Buttle with lethargy and the Citizens & Ratepayers councillors as being out of touch with Aucklanders and taking power for granted. Media coverage (both the Auckland Star and New Zealand Herald openly endorsing Buttle) cemented Robinson's image as an outsider battling the politics of vested interest, hallmarks that would define Robinson's style of campaigning and leadership for the rest of his life. The United Independents electoral ticket had merged with the Labour Party to campaign together under the Civic Reform banner and informally supported Robinson for the mayoralty.

== Mayoralty results ==
1959 Auckland mayoral election
Party	Candidate	Votes	%	±%
Independent	Dove-Myer Robinson	18,980	51.07	
Citizens & Ratepayers	Keith Buttle	17,941	48.27	−7.63
Informal votes		240	0.64	+0.54
Majority		1,039	2.79	
Turnout		37,161	46.90	

== Councillor results ==
1959 Auckland local election
Party	Candidate	Votes	%	±%
Civic Reform	Eric Armishaw	19,762	53.17	+19.22
Civic Reform	Ken Cumberland	19,335	52.03	+18.94
Civic Reform	Alfred Shone	18,961	51.02	
Citizens & Ratepayers	Tom Bloodworth	18,240	49.08	+11.24
Citizens & Ratepayers	Winifred Delugar	17,840	48.00	+9.88
Citizens & Ratepayers	Max Tongue	17,722	47.68	+14.61
Citizens & Ratepayers	Reg Savory	17,667	47.54	+11.79
Citizens & Ratepayers	Fred Ambler	17,335	46.64	+7.79
Civic Reform	Mary Dreaver	16,658	44.82	+1.78
Civic Reform	Alex Dreaver	16,582	44.62	+7.78
Citizens & Ratepayers	Bob Beechey	16,498	44.39	
Citizens & Ratepayers	John Dale	16,434	44.22	+13.19
Citizens & Ratepayers	Geoffrey Myers	16,300	43.86	−12.63
Civic Reform	George Forsyth	16,160	43.48	+9.07
Citizens & Ratepayers	Fred Glasse	16,077	43.26	−12.03
Citizens & Ratepayers	Charlie Passmore	15,639	42.08	
Civic Reform	James Neil Bradley	15,574	41.90	+4.27
Citizens & Ratepayers	George Russell Tutt	15,552	41.85	
Citizens & Ratepayers	Harold Watts	15,443	41.55	+18.00
Citizens & Ratepayers	Fred de Malmanche	15,296	41.16	
Citizens & Ratepayers	Harold Parkinson	15,165	40.80	
Citizens & Ratepayers	Norman Speer	14,924	40.16	
Civic Reform	Marion Kirk	14,691	39.53	
Civic Reform	Graeme Eric Booth	14,690	39.53	
Citizens & Ratepayers	Rex Keith Blows	14,637	39.38	
Citizens & Ratepayers	Eric Percy Salmon	14,475	38.95	
Citizens & Ratepayers	David George Falconer	14,419	38.80	
Civic Reform	Lionel Albert	14,242	38.32	+19.55
Civic Reform	Charles Belton	13,885	37.36	
Civic Reform	Glassford Glover Walter Gray	13,544	36.44	+18.41
Civic Reform	John Northey	13,542	36.44	−15.37
Citizens & Ratepayers	Frank Sydney Bertrand	13,438	36.16	
Citizens & Ratepayers	John Procter Wildman	13,429	36.13	
Citizens & Ratepayers	Harold Valentine Long	13,256	35.67	
Civic Reform	Frederick Johnston	13,091	35.22	+5.81
Civic Reform	Howard Jeffereys	12,576	33.84	
Civic Reform	Norman Finch	12,549	33.76	+6.48
Civic Reform	Isabella Stancliff	12,523	33.69	+2.61
Civic Reform	Irene Margaret Offen	12,387	33.33	
Civic Reform	John Percival Eastmure	12,384	33.32	
Civic Reform	Robert Elsender	11,907	32.04	
Civic Reform	Dave Isbey	11,242	30.25	
Independent	Roy Turner	5,069	13.64	
Independent	Charles Fisher	4,139	11.13	−10.29
Independent	Agnes Helen Dodd	3,632	9.77	−20.63
Communist	Bill Andersen	3,456	9.30	+4.28
Communist	George Jackson	3,384	9.10	
Communist	Donald McEwan	2,888	7.77	+3.06
Independent	Albert Charles Marks	2,812	7.56	
Communist	Dick Wolf	2,139	5.75	
Communist	Ella Ayo	2,128	5.72	
Communist	Peter McAra	1,544	4.15	
