= 1986 Auckland City Council election =

Local election in New Zealand

- 11 October 1986

All 21 seats on the Auckland City Council
	First party	Second party
Party	Citizens & Ratepayers	Labour
Last election	20	1
Seats won	15	5
Seat change	▼5	▲4
- Results by ward, shaded by highest polling party

The 1986 Auckland City Council election was part of the 1986 New Zealand local elections, to elect members to sub-national councils and boards. The polling was conducted using the first-past-the-post electoral method.

== Council ==
The Auckland City Council consisted of a mayor and twenty-one councillors elected from ten wards (Avondale, Blockhouse Bay, Central, Eastern Bays, Grey Lynn, Meadowbank, Point Chevalier, Ponsonby, Remuera and Tamaki).

=== Mayor ===
1986 Auckland mayoral election
Party	Candidate	Votes	%	±%
Labour	Catherine Tizard	32,390	61.55	+27.18
Independent	Marie Quinn	20,228	38.44	
Majority		12,162	23.11	+13.88
Turnout		52,618		

==== Avondale Ward ====
The Avondale Ward elects two members to the Auckland City Council

Avondale Ward
Party	Candidate	Votes	%	±%
Labour	Suzanne Sinclair	2,559	55.03	
Citizens & Ratepayers	Barry Donovan	2,496	53.67	
Citizens & Ratepayers	Murray Laloli	2,133	45.87	
Labour	Rae Philson	2,111	45.39	
Majority		363	7.80	
Turnout		4,650		

==== Blockhouse Bay Ward ====
The Blockhouse Bay Ward elects two members to the Auckland City Council

Blockhouse Bay Ward
Party	Candidate	Votes	%	±%
Citizens & Ratepayers	Patricia Thorp	2,501	48.86	
Labour	Lorraine Wilson	2,213	43.23	
Citizens & Ratepayers	Sefulu Ioane	1,920	37.51	
Labour	Rosalie Vodanovich	1,901	37.14	
Independent	Philip Waterhouse	1,158	22.62	
Independent	Winifred Waterhouse	542	10.59	
Majority		293	5.72	
Turnout		5,118		

==== Central Ward ====
The Central Ward elects three members to the Auckland City Council

Central Ward
Party	Candidate	Votes	%	±%
Citizens & Ratepayers	Harold Goodman	3,569	63.03	
Citizens & Ratepayers	Clive Edwards	2,974	52.52	
Citizens & Ratepayers	Trevor Rogers	2,970	52.45	
Labour	Judith Tizard	2,344	41.39	
Labour	Neil Morris	1,628	28.75	
Labour	John Antonio	1,443	25.48	
Independent	Raymond Hyams	1,248	22.04	
Independent	Graeme Burgess	529	9.34	
Socialist Unity	Stephen Bradley	281	4.96	
Majority		626	11.05	
Turnout		5,662		

==== Eastern Bays Ward ====
The Eastern Bays Ward elects three members to the Auckland City Council

Eastern Bays Ward
Party	Candidate	Votes	%	±%
Citizens & Ratepayers	Juliet Yates	5,920	70.20	
Citizens & Ratepayers	Ron Greer	5,107	60.55	
Citizens & Ratepayers	Bob Johnson	4,684	55.54	
Independent	Gray Bartlett	3,992	47.33	
Independent	Bill Clark	3,244	38.46	
Independent	Des Roberts	2,352	27.89	
Informal votes		692	8.20	
Turnout		8,433		

==== Grey Lynn Ward ====
The Grey Lynn Ward elects two members to the Auckland City Council

Grey Lynn Ward
Party	Candidate	Votes	%	±%
Labour	Linda Holloway	2,298	58.93	
Labour	Jim Yandall	2,067	53.01	
Citizens & Ratepayers	Patricia Tauroa	1,564	40.11	
Citizens & Ratepayers	Arthur Anae	1,289	33.05	
Independent	James Ransfield	579	14.84	
Majority		503	12.90	
Turnout		3,899		

==== Meadowbank Ward ====
The Meadowbank Ward elects two members to the Auckland City Council

Meadowbank Ward
Party	Candidate	Votes	%	±%
Citizens & Ratepayers	Phil Warren	3,344	69.47	
Citizens & Ratepayers	Barrie Hutchinson	3,235	67.21	
Independent	Michael Hart	3,047	63.30	
Majority		188	3.90	
Turnout		4,813		

==== Point Chevalier Ward ====
The Point Chevalier Ward elects one member to the Auckland City Council

Point Chevalier Ward
Party	Candidate	Votes	%	±%
Citizens & Ratepayers	Gordon Barnaby	1,406	44.94	
Labour	Terry Ryan	1,185	37.88	
Independent	Peter Anich	537	17.16	
Majority		221	7.06	
Turnout		3,128		

==== Ponsonby Ward ====
The Ponsonby Ward elects two members to the Auckland City Council

Ponsonby Ward
Party	Candidate	Votes	%	±%
Independent	Betty Wark	2,102	48.63	
Labour	Bruce Hucker	2,010	46.50	
Labour	Anne Andrews	1,950	45.11	
Citizens & Ratepayers	Ann Gluckman	1,461	33.80	
Citizens & Ratepayers	Laurence Johnstone	1,121	25.93	
Majority		60	1.38	
Turnout		4,322		

==== Remuera Ward ====
The Remuera Ward elects two members to the Auckland City Council

Remuera Ward
Party	Candidate	Votes	%	±%
Citizens & Ratepayers	John Strevens	3,071	61.76	
Citizens & Ratepayers	Elizabeth Currey	2,824	56.79	
Independent	Marie Quinn	1,987	39.96	
Independent	Dove-Myer Robinson	1,077	21.66	
Independent	Luke Van Ryn	985	19.81	
Majority		837	16.83	
Turnout		4,972		

==== Tamaki Ward ====
The Tamaki Ward elects two members to the Auckland City Council

Tamaki Ward
Party	Candidate	Votes	%	±%
Citizens & Ratepayers	Stephen Kirkwood	2,652	61.03	
Citizens & Ratepayers	Reg Mullins	2,187	50.33	
Labour	Robyn Northey	2,065	47.52	
Labour	Chris Hayward	1,785	41.08	
Majority		122	2.80	
Turnout		4,345		

== Other local elections ==
=== Auckland Harbour Board - City of Auckland and Waiheke Ward ===
The City of Auckland and Waiheke Ward elects four members to the Auckland Harbour Board

City of Auckland and Waiheke Ward
Party	Candidate	Votes	%	±%
Citizens & Ratepayers	Harry Julian	23,386	47.10	
Citizens & Ratepayers	Ian McKay	19,613	39.50	
Citizens & Ratepayers	Richard Holden	18,682	37.62	
Tim's Team	Colin Bower	18,161	36.58	
Tim's Team	Diedre Nehua	17,793	35.83	
Citizens & Ratepayers	Miller Mason	17,774	35.80	
Tim's Team	George Robertson	17,272	34.78	
Tim's Team	David Wickham	16,831	33.90	
Labour	Hamish Keith	16,717	33.67	
Labour	James Baxter	9,996	20.13	
Labour	Andrew Turnbull	8,450	17.02	
Labour	Harry Palmer	8,376	16.87	
Independent	Charles Price	5,537	11.15	
Majority		368	0.74	
Turnout		49,647		

=== Auckland Hospital Board - City of Auckland and Waiheke Ward ===
The City of Auckland and Waiheke Ward elects two members to the Auckland Hospital Board

City of Auckland and Waiheke Ward
Party	Candidate	Votes	%	±%
Citizens & Ratepayers	Bill Manchester	26,736	54.10	
Citizens & Ratepayers	John Seabrook	26,158	52.93	
Independent	Alan Spence	15,015	30.38	
Labour	John Harre	11,931	24.14	
Labour	Eru Potaka-Dewes	10,881	22.01	
Independent	Ida Cargill	8,116	16.42	
Majority		11,143	22.54	
Turnout		49,419		
