= 1965 Auckland City mayoral election =

New Zealand mayoral election

← 1962	9 October 1965	1968 →
- Turnout: 36,503 (47.23%)
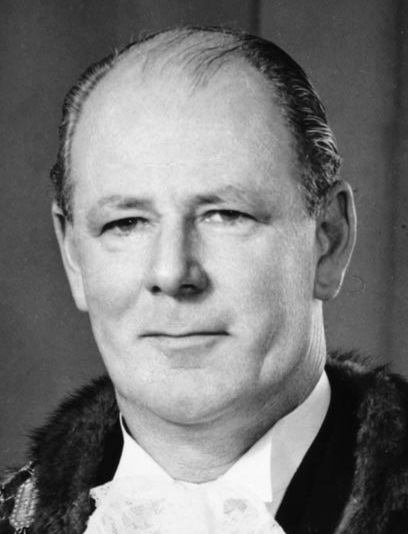

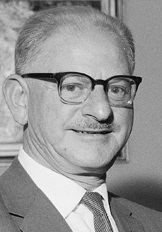
Candidate	Roy McElroy	Dove-Myer Robinson
Party	Citizens & Ratepayers	Independent
Popular vote	17,132	15,998
Percentage	46.93	43.82
Mayor before election
Dove-Myer Robinson
Elected mayor
Roy McElroy

The 1965 Auckland City mayoral election was part of the New Zealand local elections held that same year. In 1965, elections were held for the Mayor of Auckland plus other local government positions including twenty-one city councillors. The polling was conducted using the standard first-past-the-post electoral method.

== Background ==
Incumbent two-term Mayor Dove-Myer Robinson was defeated by Roy McElroy of the Citizens & Ratepayers ticket. Robinson's position had been worsened by the entry of Labour Party councillor George Forsyth to the race which allowed McElroy to win on a split vote.

== Mayoralty results ==
1965 Auckland mayoral election
Party	Candidate	Votes	%	±%
Citizens & Ratepayers	Roy McElroy	17,132	46.93	
Independent	Dove-Myer Robinson	15,998	43.82	−7.35
Labour	George Forsyth	3,373	9.25	
Majority		1,134	3.10	
Turnout		36,503	47.23	

== Councillor results ==
1965 Auckland local election
Party	Candidate	Votes	%	±%
Citizens & Ratepayers	Arapeta Awatere	22,274	61.01	+21.97
Citizens & Ratepayers	Sir Keith Park	21,701	59.44	−11.15
Citizens & Ratepayers	Tom Pearce	21,506	58.91	+22.13
Citizens & Ratepayers	Fred Glasse	20,489	56.12	+12.22
Citizens & Ratepayers	Tom Bloodworth	19,672	53.89	+1.25
Citizens & Ratepayers	Bob Beechey	19,578	53.63	−10.91
Citizens & Ratepayers	John Dale	19,508	53.44	−7.24
Citizens & Ratepayers	Winifred Horton	19,159	52.48	+6.77
Citizens & Ratepayers	Harold Watts	19,153	52.46	+5.69
Citizens & Ratepayers	Winifred Delugar	18,718	51.27	±0.00
Citizens & Ratepayers	Max Tongue	18,657	51.11	−0.93
Citizens & Ratepayers	Thomas Littlejohn	17,788	48.73	
Citizens & Ratepayers	George Russell Tutt	17,298	47.38	+5.80
Citizens & Ratepayers	Mel Tronson	16,916	46.34	
Independent	Fred Ambler	16,884	46.25	+1.40
Citizens & Ratepayers	Ian McKinnon	16,599	45.47	
Independent	Eric Armishaw	15,394	42.17	−1.42
Citizens & Ratepayers	Thomas Roy Sussex	15,236	41.73	
Labour	George Forsyth	13,994	38.33	+1.96
Labour	Alex Dreaver	13,490	36.95	−4.50
Citizens & Ratepayers	Bill Clark	13,316	36.47	
Citizens & Ratepayers	Alan George Simms	12,448	34.10	
Independent	William Grant-Mackie	12,305	33.70	+0.46
Labour	Lew Pryme	11,686	32.01	
Citizens & Ratepayers	Basil Roy Arnott	11,635	31.87	−1.16
Citizens & Ratepayers	Robert Alfred Heaney	11,412	31.26	+0.47
Citizens & Ratepayers	Edward Cecil Nimon	11,438	31.33	
Labour	Annie Elizabeth Beresford	10,593	29.01	+2.92
Civic Action	Daniel Finnigan	10,099	27.66	
Civic Action	Michael Hart	9,933	27.21	
Labour	Roy Turner	9,526	26.09	
Labour	Graham Caldwell	9,454	25.89	+6.37
Labour	Thomas Price	8,975	24.58	+5.41
Labour	Frank Haigh	8,713	23.86	
Civic Action	Alison Bridgeman	7,810	21.39	
Labour	Eileen Johnson	7,680	21.03	
Labour	John Mita Karaka	7,142	19.56	
Independent	Barry Donovan	6,952	19.04	
Labour	Whai Mataira	6,933	18.99	
Civic Action	Francis Halpin	6,729	18.43	
Labour	Anita Rona Von Zalinski	6,553	17.95	−2.34
Labour	James Gerrard Taylor	6,251	17.12	
Labour	Inez Freeman	6,266	17.16	
Labour	Irene Margaret Offen	6,167	16.89	−3.23
Communist	Diana Grant-Mackie	5,901	16.16	
Independent	Albert Edward Bailey	5,370	14.71	−25.88
Labour	Robert Elsender	5,339	15.62	
Independent	Barry Wright	5,286	14.48	
Labour	Derek Brunning	5,267	14.42	
Labour	Matthew Sosich	5,058	13.85	
Independent	Pat Curran	4,497	12.31	
Communist	Bill Andersen	3,141	8.60	−10.75
Communist	James Casey	2,694	7.38	
Communist	Donald McEwan	2,485	6.80	
Communist	Mortimer Irvine	2,166	5.93	
Communist	Lenard Thomas Smith	2,059	5.64	
Communist	Alec Ostler	1,681	4.60	−1.59
Communist	Peter McAra	1,659	4.54	−0.22
Communist	Alec Rait	1,197	3.27	
