= 1974 Auckland City mayoral election =

New Zealand mayoral election

| ← 1971 | 12 October 1974 | 1977 → |
- Turnout: 39,881 (43.44%)
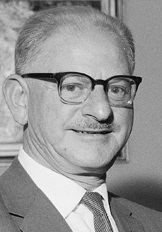
| Candidate | Dove-Myer Robinson | Jim Anderton |
| Party | Independent | Labour |
| Popular vote | 19,762 | 12,717 |
| Percentage | 49.55 | 31.90 |
Mayor before election
Dove-Myer Robinson
Elected mayor
Dove-Myer Robinson

The 1974 Auckland City mayoral election was part of the New Zealand local elections held that same year. In 1974, elections were held for the Mayor of Auckland plus other local government positions including twenty-one city councillors. The polling was conducted using the standard first-past-the-post electoral method.

== Background ==
Incumbent Mayor Dove-Myer Robinson was re-elected seeing off a challenge from Labour Party candidate Jim Anderton, who won a seat on the council despite losing the mayoralty. Grahame Sims, the retiring town clerk, ran for mayor and accused Robinson of being a Citizens & Ratepayers stooge. This followed the C&R deputy mayor Lindo Ferguson endorsing Robinson for the mayoralty. Sims called it "seat warming", insinuating Ferguson would run for mayor at the next election.

== Mayoralty results ==
1974 Auckland mayoral election
| Party | Candidate | Votes | % | ±% |
|---|---|---|---|---|
| Independent | Dove-Myer Robinson | 19,762 | 49.55 | −40.80 |
| Labour | Jim Anderton | 12,717 | 31.90 | |
| Independent | Grahame Sims | 6,241 | 15.64 | |
| Informal votes | | 1,161 | 2.91 | |
| Majority | | 7,045 | 17.66 | −67.68 |
| Turnout | | 39,881 | 43.44 | +7.17 |

== Councillor results ==
1974 Auckland City Council election
| Party | Candidate | Votes | % | ±% |
|---|---|---|---|---|
| Citizens & Ratepayers | Lindo Ferguson | 22,761 | 58.78 | +9.33 |
| Citizens & Ratepayers | Harry Dansey | 21,219 | 54.80 | +3.46 |
| Citizens & Ratepayers | Lindsay Adams | 20,599 | 53.19 | −1.87 |
| Citizens & Ratepayers | Colin Kay | 20,506 | 52.95 | +3.11 |
| Citizens & Ratepayers | Norman Ambler | 20,491 | 52.92 | |
| Citizens & Ratepayers | Eric Salmon | 20,164 | 52.07 | −1.41 |
| Citizens & Ratepayers | Jolyon Firth | 19,759 | 51.03 | +2.24 |
| Citizens & Ratepayers | Sheila Horton | 19,749 | 51.00 | |
| Citizens & Ratepayers | Mel Tronson | 19,348 | 49.96 | −2.64 |
| Citizens & Ratepayers | John Strevens | 19,129 | 49.40 | +1.59 |
| Citizens & Ratepayers | Ian McKinnon | 18,792 | 48.53 | +0.50 |
| Citizens & Ratepayers | Paddy Walker | 18,510 | 47.80 | |
| Labour | Catherine Tizard | 18,440 | 47.62 | +2.53 |
| Labour | Jim Anderton | 18,034 | 46.57 | |
| Citizens & Ratepayers | Gordon Barnaby | 17,926 | 46.29 | +3.26 |
| Citizens & Ratepayers | Rev. Selwyn Dawson | 17,374 | 44.87 | |
| Citizens & Ratepayers | Kenneth Sydney Dobson | 17,300 | 44.67 | |
| Citizens & Ratepayers | Allan Charles Coulam | 16,469 | 42.53 | |
| Citizens & Ratepayers | Fred Hill | 16,101 | 41.58 | |
| Citizens & Ratepayers | Bill Clark | 16,020 | 41.37 | |
| Citizens & Ratepayers | Cec Field | 15,250 | 39.38 | |
| Citizens & Ratepayers | Nanu Lelaulu | 15,116 | 39.03 | |
| Citizens & Ratepayers | Reginald Rikys | 14,169 | 36.59 | |
| Labour | Alex Dreaver | 14,138 | 36.51 | −7.74 |
| Labour | Helen Clark | 13,928 | 35.97 | |
| Labour | John Prebble | 13,169 | 34.01 | |
| Labour | Richard Northey | 13,162 | 33.99 | +1.91 |
| Labour | Betty Wark | 13,063 | 33.73 | +5.20 |
| Labour | David Lange | 12,370 | 31.94 | |
| Labour | Barbara Devonshire | 11,718 | 30.26 | |
| Labour | Michael Roger Stenson | 11,304 | 29.19 | +0.12 |
| Labour | Frank Haigh | 11,190 | 28.89 | |
| Labour | Titewhai Harawira | 11,161 | 28.82 | |
| Labour | Brian Francis Healy | 10,794 | 27.87 | |
| Labour | Bruce Hucker | 10,734 | 27.72 | |
| Labour | Roderick Murray Carter | 10,664 | 27.54 | −1.21 |
| Labour | Mary Nacey | 10,556 | 27.26 | |
| Values | Reg Clough | 10,326 | 26.66 | |
| Labour | Barry McLean | 9,862 | 25.47 | |
| Labour | Garth Houltham | 9,770 | 25.23 | |
| Labour | Marion McQuoid | 9,387 | 24.24 | −0.32 |
| Labour | Christopher Pickett | 9,106 | 23.51 | |
| Labour | Ua Tamarua | 9,035 | 23.33 | |
| Labour | William Forbes-Hamilton | 8,992 | 23.22 | |
| Values | Elizabeth Glasgow | 7,597 | 19.62 | |
| Values | Raewyn Gwenith Braggins | 5,812 | 15.01 | |
| Values | Andrew Quail | 5,614 | 14.49 | |
| Values | Francis Rex Hamlin | 5,562 | 14.36 | |
| Values | Terry Mann | 5,452 | 14.08 | |
| Independent | Peter van Gessel | 2,990 | 7.72 | |
| Socialist Unity | Bill Andersen | 2,533 | 6.54 | −5.25 |
| Socialist Unity | George Jackson | 1,769 | 4.56 | −3.72 |
| Socialist Unity | Joseph Telford | 1,535 | 3.96 | |
| Socialist Unity | Leonard Thomas Gale | 1,232 | 3.18 | |
