= MV Kaitawa =

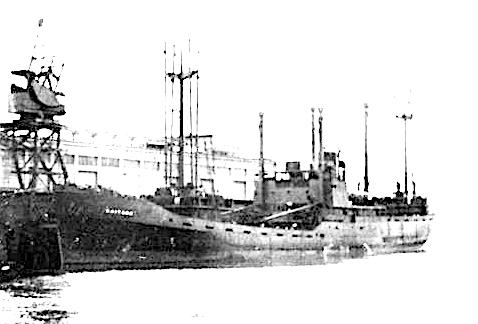
- Kaitawa

History
- Name: Kaitawa
- Owner: Union Steamship Company
- Yard number: 375
- Fate: Wrecked 24 May 1966

General characteristics
- Type: Collier
- Tonnage: 2,485 GRT
- Length: 85.1 m (279 ft 2 in)
- Beam: 13.2 m (43 ft 4 in)
- Draught: 5.3 m (17 ft 5 in)
- Installed power: 2 × 725-horsepower (541 kW) diesel engines
- Speed: 9.5 knots (17.6 km/h; 10.9 mph)

MV Kaitawa was a 2,485-ton collier owned by the Union Steamship Company. She was lost with all hands on 24 May 1966 near Cape Reinga, New Zealand.

== Description ==
The vessel was a 2,485-ton steel collier built in Leith, Scotland in 1949 by Henry Robb Limited for the Union Steam Ship Company. Kaitawa was one of three ships ordered by the company. The other two were the Kaiapoi and the Kamona. She was used primarily to bring coal from the coal fields on the West Coast, New Zealand to North Island ports. Her dimensions were 85.1 metres (279 ft 2 in) long, 13.2 metres (43 ft 4 in) wide and a draught of 5.3 metres (17 ft 5 in). She was propelled by two 725-horsepower (541 kW) diesel engines and was capable of 9.5 knots (17.6 km/h; 10.9 mph). Her yard number was 375.

Kaitawa did not have an echo sounder or radar. Her British Polar twin diesel main engines were prone to cut out and stop if the collier rolled more than about 15 degrees.

== Voyages ==
During the 1951 New Zealand waterfront dispute she was manned by Royal New Zealand Navy personnel.

== Final voyage ==
The Kaitawa sailed with 29 crew from Westport under Captain George R Sherlock at 1.15pm on 21 May 1966 with a cargo of 2,957 tons of coal. She was bound for the Portland cement works at Whangārei via the North Cape. Her departure had been delayed because the second mate, R P Oakton, suffered appendicitis the night before and a replacement mate, M G Jenkins, had been flown in.

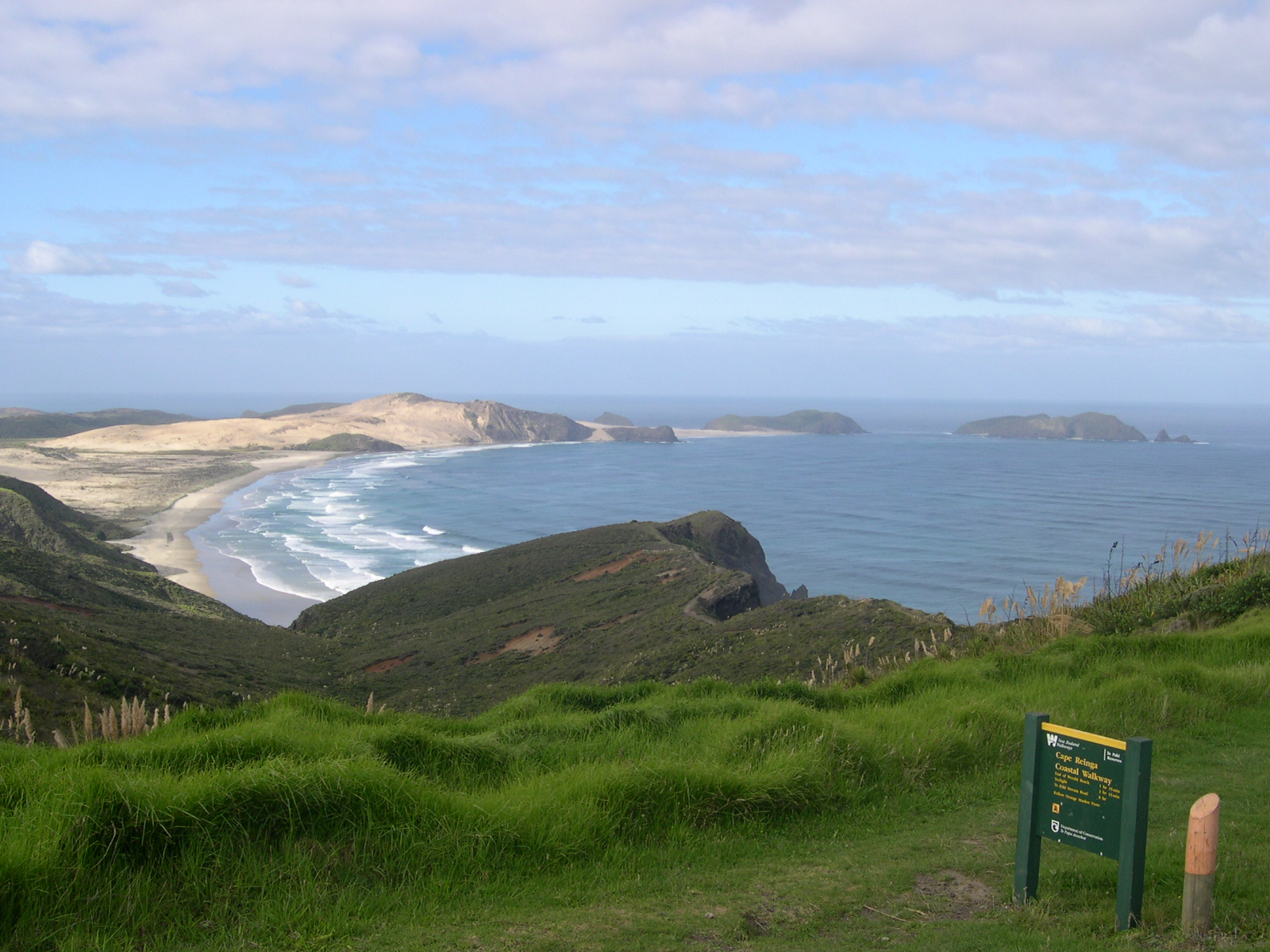
Cape Maria van Diemen and Motuopao Island. Pandora Bank lies about 8 kilometres (5.0 mi) south southwest beyond Cape Maria van Diemen

At 8pm on 24 May the Kaitawa was seen by the watch officer on the Lyle Shipping Co cargo ship MV Cape Horn about five miles (8.0 km) west of the northern end of the Pandora Bank. The seas were heavy and there was a strong 35-knot (65 km/h; 40 mph) westerly gale. She hit the Pandora Bank at about 9pm. Her hold breached and the cargo of loose coal shifted causing her to capsize and sink with all hands.

Her final message at 9.18pm was:

Position (some words missing) 10 miles Cape Reinga bearing 035 (word missing) 30 degrees require immediate assistance.

On receipt of the message the Cape Horn began to retrace her journey towards where the Kaitawa was thought to be. A red flare at 11.50pm bearing 23 degrees and between five and ten miles (8.0 and 16.1 km) away from the Cape Horn, but due to the proximity to Pandora Bank and the rough seas the search was held off until first light. At 11.25 am on 25 May a No. 5 Squadron RNZAF Sunderland flying boat sighted an oil slick about one mile (1.6 km) north of Pandora Bank, and wreckage drifting towards the coast. Most of the wreckage drifted ashore at Twilight Bay (Te Paengarehia). The search was continued by HMNZS Kiama, with the Hong Kong shipping lines fieghter Kweichow and the collier Kaiapoi joining on the 27 May.

The wreck was located at 24 fathoms (144 ft; 44 m) and without its superstructure and cargo. Her position was fixed at 246 degrees True and 4.77 miles (7.68 km) from Cape Reinga light on 8 June by HMNZS Tui. One body was recovered which washed up on Ninety Mile Beach.

In response to the disaster the Kaitawa relief fund was established with Auckland City Councillor and former Royal Navy officer George Forsyth as the fund's chairman.

== Memorial ==
A memorial to the Kaitawa tragedy is located at the breakwater on the Buller River mouth near Westport. The GPS location of memorial is 41° 43.629′S, 171° 35.355′E. The memorial consists of a plaque bearing the names of the crew and an anchor (not from the Kaitawa) mounted on a round concrete plinth. Another memorial is located in the Aucklqand International Seafarers' Centre in Tooley Street, Auckland Central.

== Literature ==
Bert Roth wrote a song about the sinking that was published in a short-lived New Zealand magazine called Fern Fire.

C. K. Stead wrote a poem ('Twenty-One Sonnets' 2) recollecting hearing the news of Kaitawa's loss.
