= Yvette Overdyck =

New Zealand architect

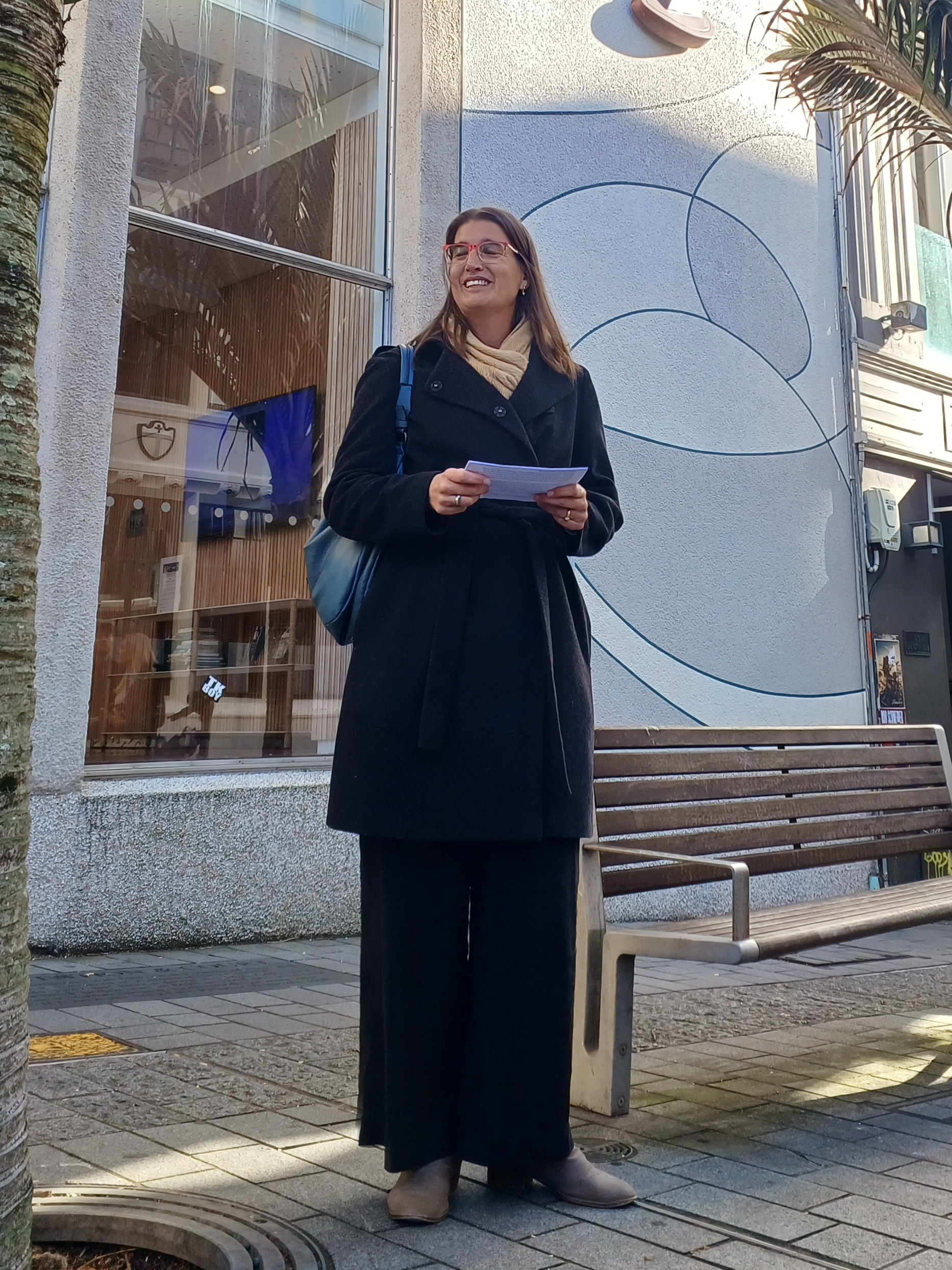
- Born: Overdyck speaking in front of the Ellen Melville Centre in 2024
- Education: Unitec Institute of Technology
- Occupation: Architect
- Awards: New Zealand Architecture Medal

Yvette Overdyck is a New Zealand architect.

== Biography ==
Overdyck completed a degree in architecture at Unitec Institute of Technology in Auckland. She has worked at Herbst Architects and Stevens Lawson Architects, where she was a senior associate. In 2024 she co-founded Lammas Overdyck Architects.

Overdyck was part of the team that won the 2015 New Zealand Architecture Medal for work on Blyth Performing Arts Centre, at Iona College in Hawkes Bay. Overdyck worked with Dorita Hannah and Raukura Turei on the design, which was completed in 2014. Overdyck was also the joint project architect for another large classroom and library building at the school.

In 2023, Overdyck was a juror for the New Zealand Institute of Architects Auckland Architecture Awards.
