= Ellen Melville Centre =

Community centre in Auckland, New Zealand

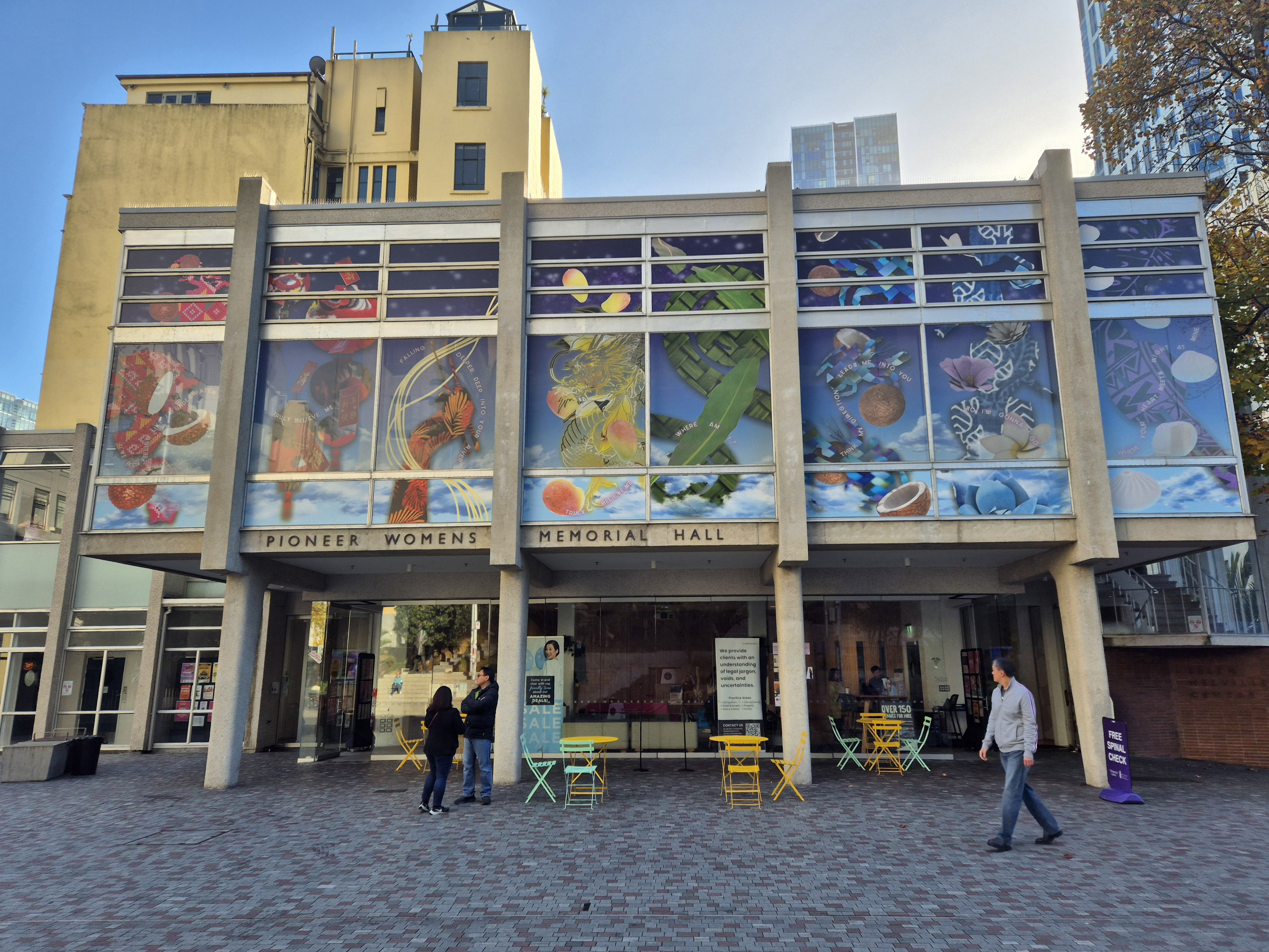
- The Ellen Melville Centre in 2024
- Interactive map of the Ellen Melville Centre area
- Alternative names: Pioneer Women's Memorial Hall

General information
- Type: Community centre
- Location: 2 Freyberg Place, Auckland City Centre, New Zealand 1000, New Zealand
- Coordinates: 36.8476°S 174.7668°E
- Completed: 1962
- Owner: Auckland Council

Design and construction
- Architect: Tibor Donner

The Ellen Melville Centre is a community centre located in Freyberg Square in central Auckland, New Zealand. It is named after Ellen Melville, the first woman to be elected to the Auckland City Council and the second New Zealand woman to become a lawyer.

== History ==
Melville proposed a community hall in the central city as a centenary project to mark 100 years since the signing of the Treaty of Waitangi and to commemorate the work of pioneer women in the establishment and development of Auckland. However work only got underway in the late 1950s and the hall was opened in 1962 as a base for women's societies. The original building, named the Pioneer Women's & Ellen Melville Memorial Hall, was designed by Auckland City Chief Architect Tibor Donner. It cost £56,200, including a £30,000 donation from the Queen Street Business Association, £19,000 from the Auckland City Council and £8,000 raised by 64 women’s organisations.

The centre was extensively refurbished and reopened in September 2017. As part of the refurbishment a large scale bronze sculpture by Lisa Reihana was commissioned. The work, Justice depicts the scales of justice but tipped in favour of women. The centre has five bookable spaces available for community use, with classes and programmes run by organisations including the Plunket Society. The five rooms are each named after a prominent woman from the region: Helen Clark, Betty Wark, Elizabeth Yates, Marilyn Waring and Eleitino (Paddy) Walker.

== Gallery ==
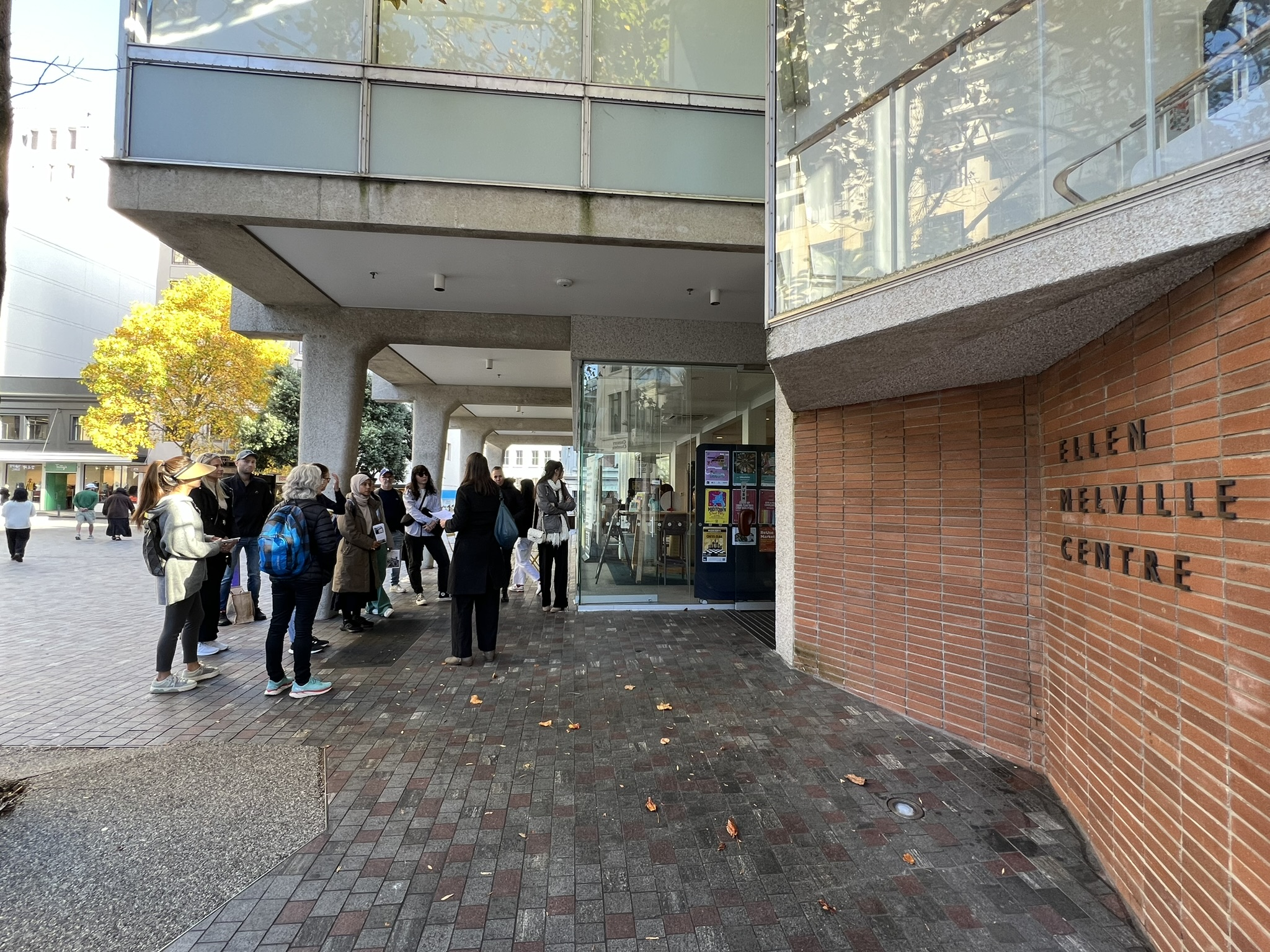
Entry and colonnade of Ellen Melville Centre

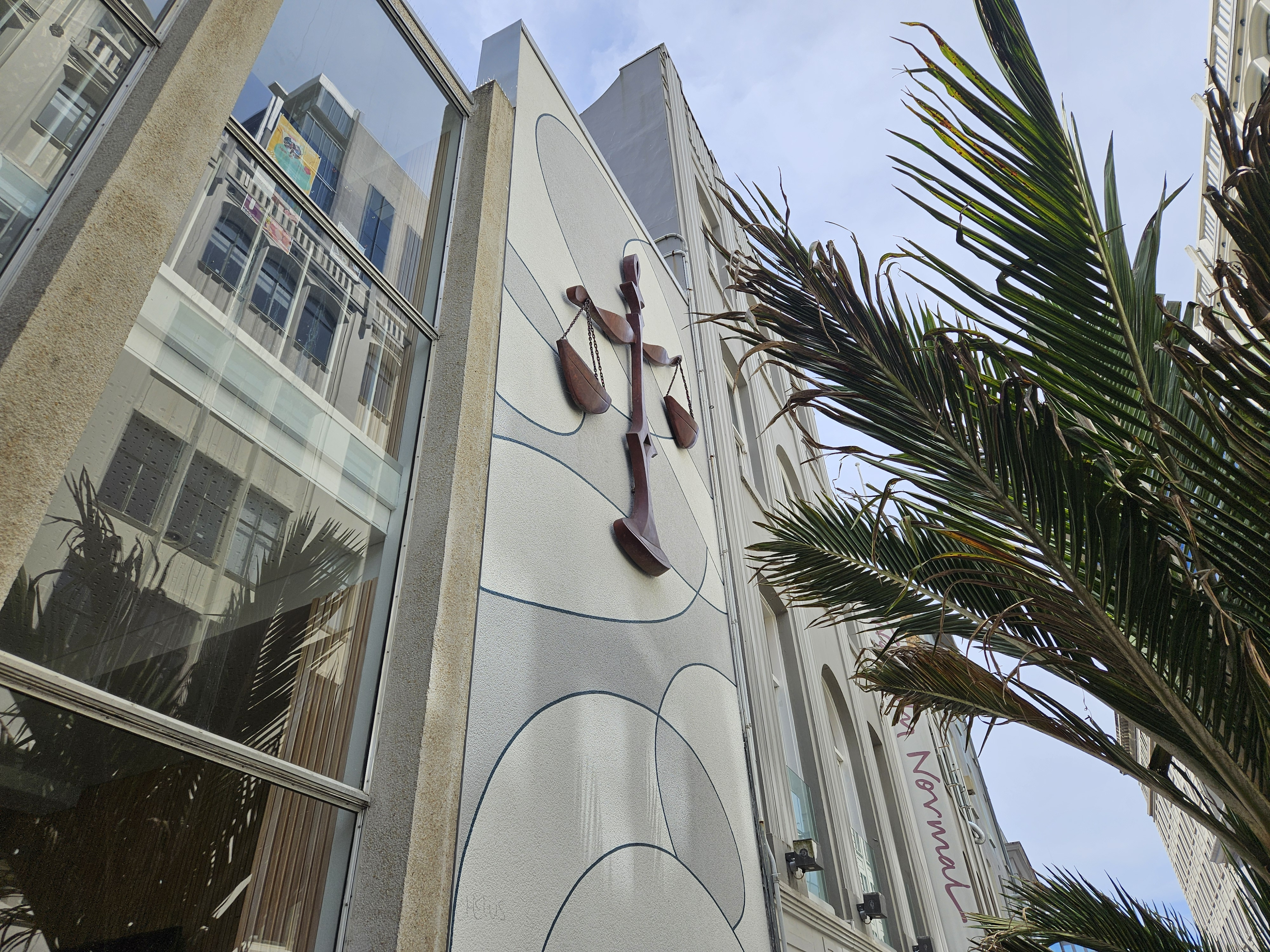
Justice, a 2017 relief sculpture by Lisa Reihana located at the centre

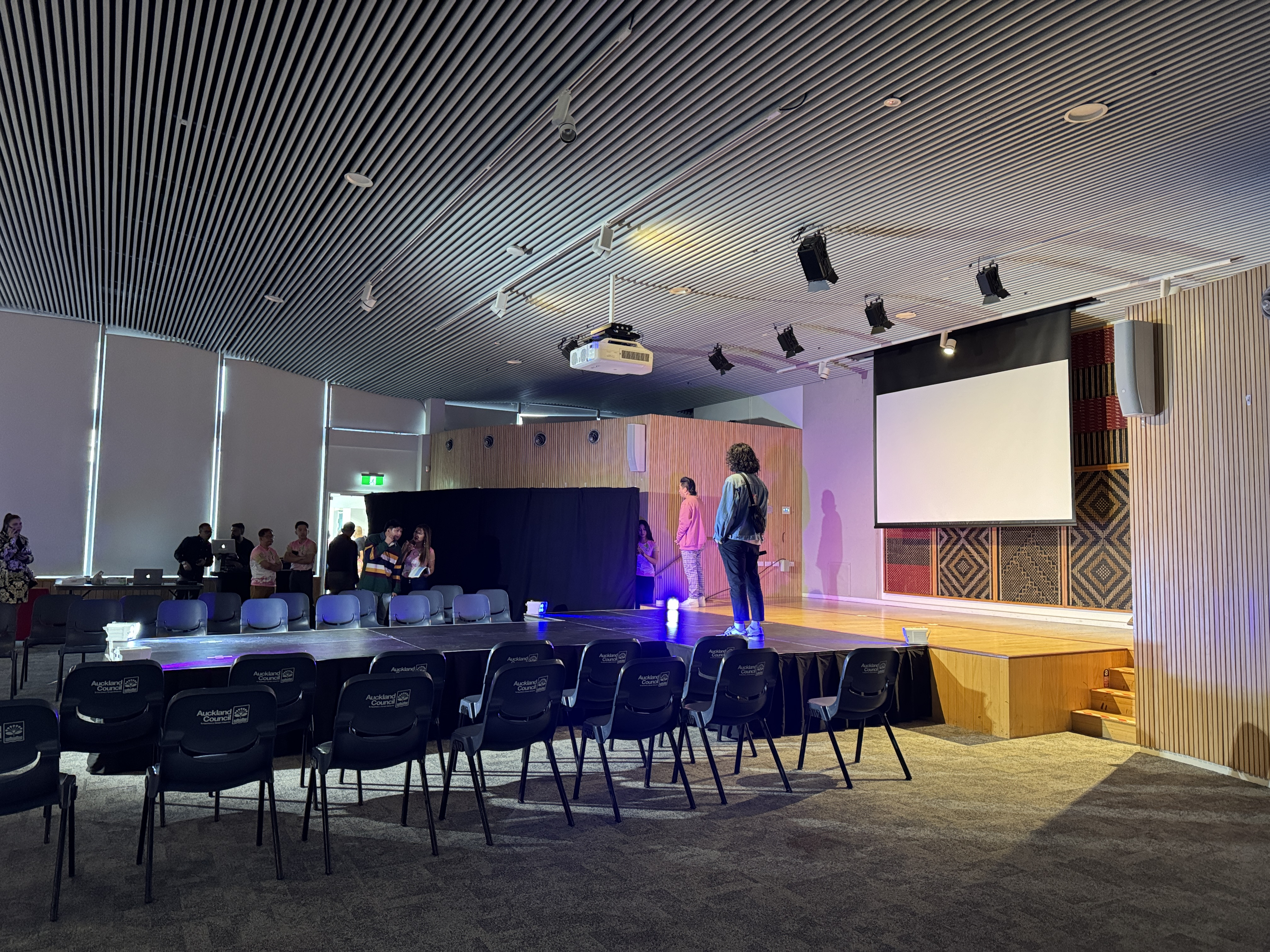
Interior of the Ellen Melville Centre

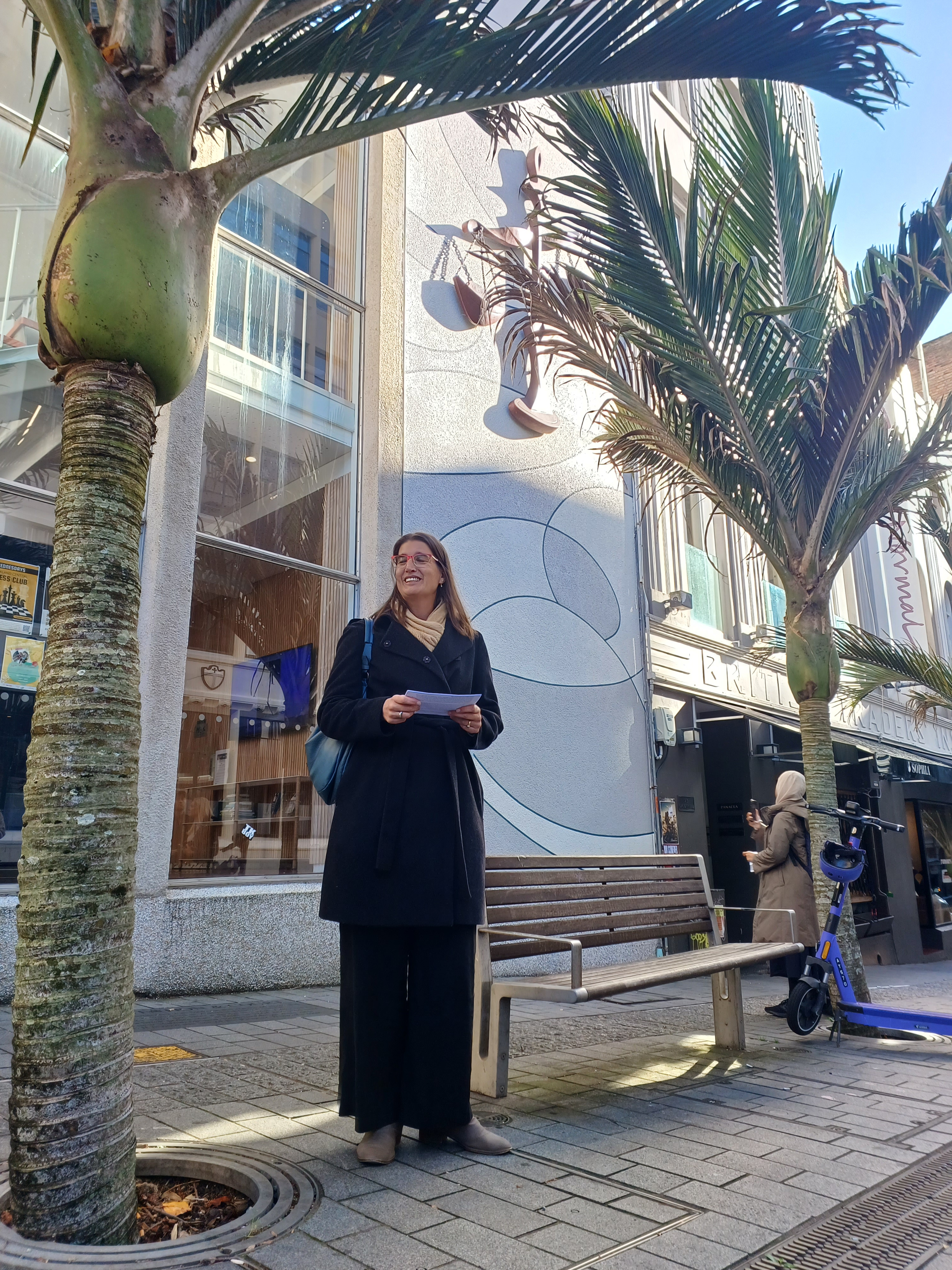
Architect Yvette Overdyck speaking about the 2017 Ellen Melville Centre refurbishment outside of the centre in 2024
