= Lisa Reihana =

New Zealand artist (born 1964)

Lisa Reihana CNZM
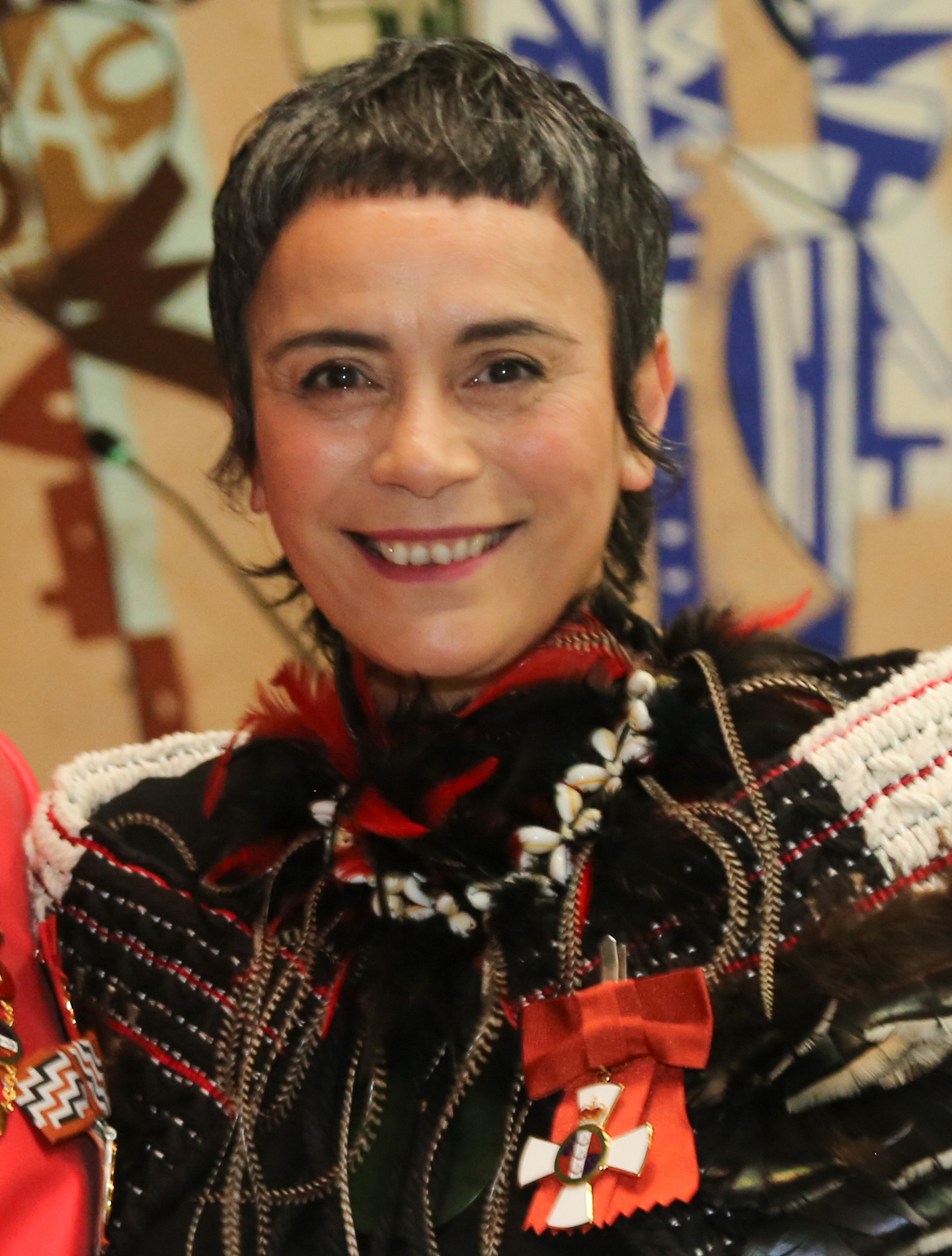
- Reihana in 2022
- Born: Lisa Marie Reihana; 1964 (age 61–62); Auckland, New Zealand

Lisa Marie Reihana CNZM (born 1964) is a New Zealand artist. Her video work, In Pursuit of Venus [Infected] (2015), which examines early encounters between Polynesians and European explorers, was featured at the 2017 Venice Biennale.

== Early life ==
Reihana grew up in Blockhouse Bay, Auckland. She is of Māori (Ngāpuhi, Ngāti Hine, Ngāi Tūteauru) descent.

=== Education ===
Reihana attended Lynfield College, after which she attended the Elam School of Fine Arts at Auckland University in 1983, graduating in 1987 with a Bachelor of Fine Arts. She graduated with a masters in design from Unitec Institute of Technology Department of Design and Contemporary Arts in 2014.

== Career ==
In 1990, Reihana with the film Wog Features was one of seven artists in the exhibition Choice! curated by George Hubbard at Artspace in Auckland. The following year she was included in Pleasures and Dangers: Artists of the '90s, a publication and documentary of the same name produced by the Moet & Chandon New Zealand Art Foundation showcasing "the work of eight exciting younger artists, most just now making their mark nationally and overseas". Reihana is a member of the Pacific Sisters, a collective founded in 1992 with whom she took part in the 12th Biennale of Sydney in 2000.

In 2006, Reihana was one of fifteen New Zealand artists, most of Māori and Pacific Island descent, who were invited to take part in the Pasifika Styles exhibition by making site-specific works throughout the Museum of Archaeology and Anthropology, University of Cambridge that responded to objects in the museum's collection. For her work He Tautoko (2006) Reihana responded to the museum's Oceania collection, making an iwi connection by selecting a Ngāpuhi tekoteko (carved gable figure) to work with.

Using footage of collection items filmed on an earlier visit to the museum, Reihana made a video of "multi-layered images and animated tukutuku patterns" that she played on a screen mounted behind the teketeko. Next to the cabinet holding the tekoteko three handsets made audio recordings available for visitors to listen to: the tracks included a recording of songs sung by the Manukau Institute of Technology's Māori choir, the sound of carver Lyonel Grant chiselling a pattern similar to that found on the tekoteko, and recordings of voices reading information about the tekoteko's provenance. A pair of 1960s headphones were positioned on the tekoteko's head. Underneath the cabinet holding the tekoteko Reihana placed another work, fluffy fings, as a playful counterpoint, a collection of "furry and feathery horn works with titles such as thingymybobs and plush tusks." Reihana wrote of this display "The colourful nature of this work appeals to adults and children alike. So that parents could spend more time with he tautoko, fluffy fings was placed at a child's eye level."

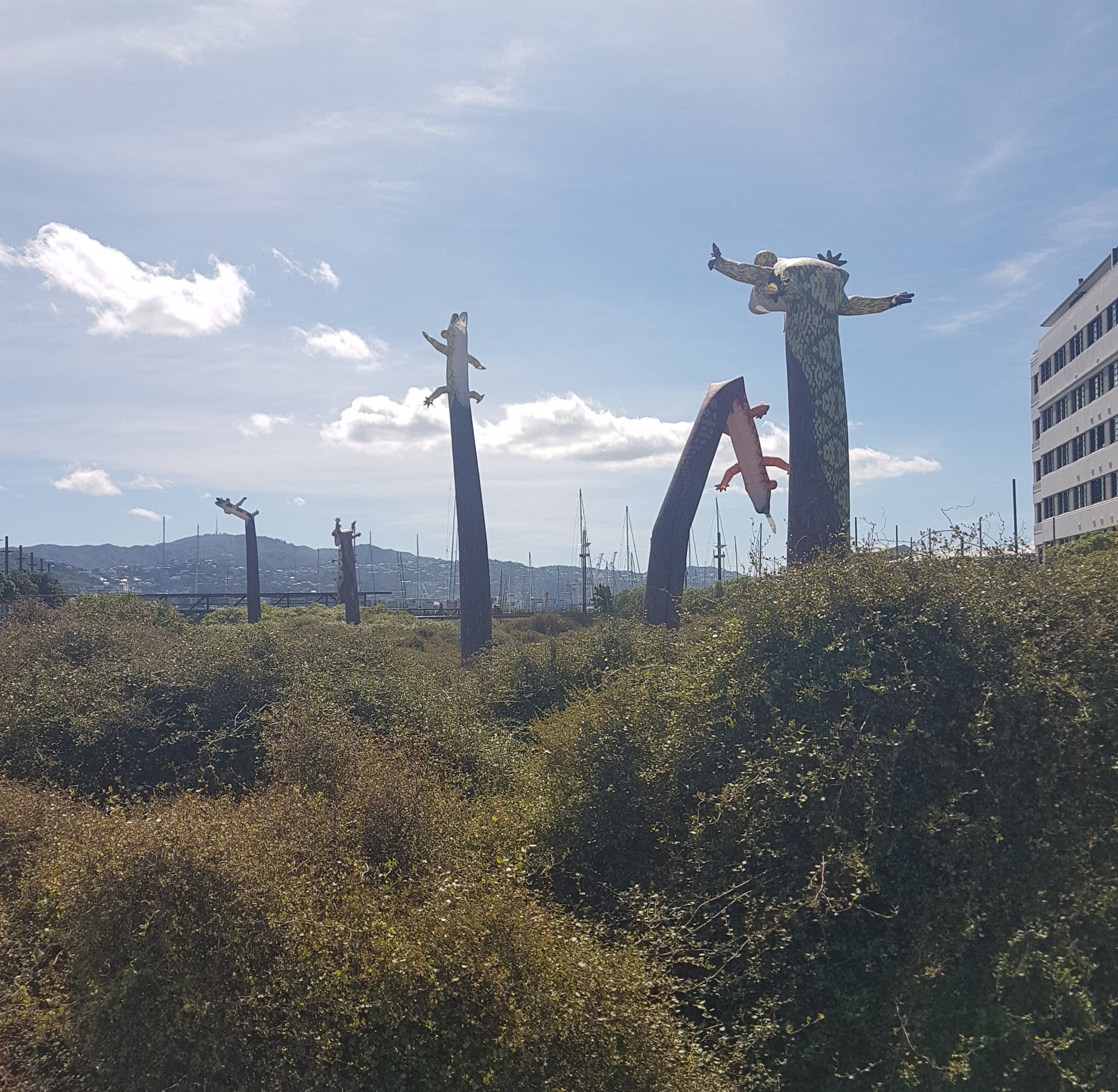
Ngā Kaikanikani ō te Rangi - The Sky Dancers - Waitangi Park by Lisa Reihana, Aotearoa New Zealand Festival 2022

Art historian Peter Brunt observes of Reihana's work in Pasifika Styles:

Reihana's work exemplifies two preoccupations of contemporary Pacific art. One is the desire to re-examine colonial history, to excavate, remember and re-present countless micro-histories and counter-memories in formally experimental ways. The second is the desire to draw inspiration from the 'life-worlds' of cultural communities in the present.

In 2008, Reihana completed a major commission for the Museum of New Zealand Te Papa Tongarewa. Installed along Te Ara a Hine (one of the two entrances to the marae in the museum) the work, Mai i te aroha, ko te aroha ('From love, comes love'), was made up of seven components, including video, digital photography and textile design. In the same year Reihana was one of three New Zealand artists selected for the Liverpool Biennale.

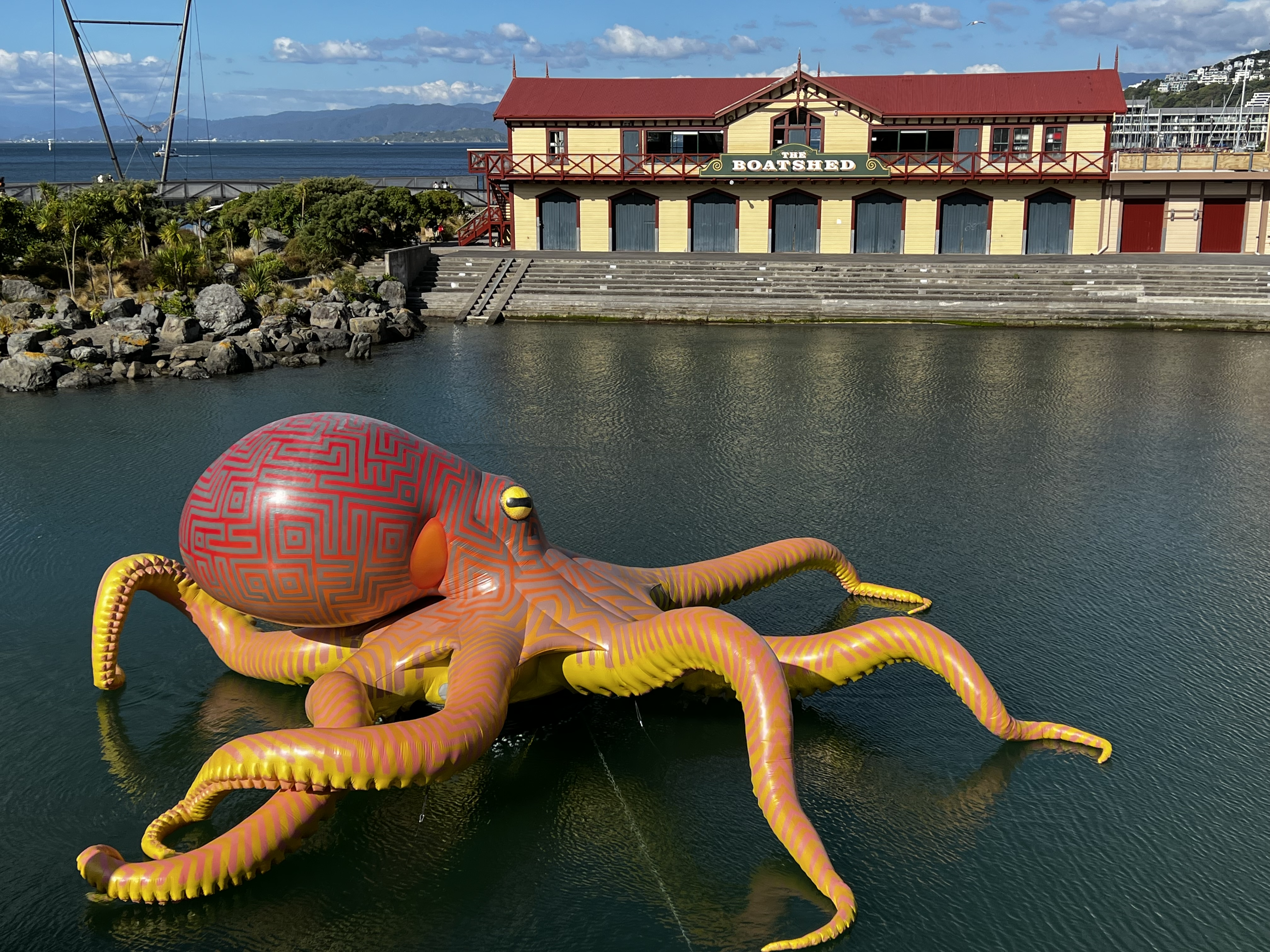
Te-Wheke-a-Muturangi one of Reihana's six installations for the Aotearoa New Zealand Festival of the Arts in Wellington, 2022

In 2014, Reihana received an Arts Laureate Award from the Arts Foundation of New Zealand. In March 2016 Reihana was named as a nominee in the biennial Walters Prize for her work in Pursuit of Venus [infected].

Reihana was the 2022 Artist in Focus at the Aotearoa New Zealand Festival of the Arts where she curated a programme of work.

== In Pursuit of Venus [infected] ==
Reihana's major multi-channel video work In Pursuit of Venus [Infected] (2015) went on display at the Auckland Art Gallery in May 2015. Six years in the making, the work is based on a large 19th-century scenic wallpaper, Les Sauvages de la Mer Pacifique, created by French firm Joseph Dufour et Cie which depicts a romanticised view of the landscapes and people of the Pacific. Using the landscape forms of the wallpaper as a backdrop, Reihana added live action scenes recorded in front of green screens, showing interactions between Europeans and Polynesians. Reihana worked with theatre director Rachel House, actors and students from the Pacific Institute of Performing Arts to create this 32-minute film installation. Reihana's script re-examines the first encounters between Polynesians and Europeans with scenes that depict the intricacies of cultural identity and colonisation. Instead of Dufour's romanticised depictions of Europeans interacting with native people, Reihana shows the realities of these interactions, including scenes of violence and exchanges of goods for sexual favours.

In a review of the work, John Hurell writes:

In this eagerly anticipated, but not hyped up, narrative packed panorama by Lisa Reihana (it is as good as the advance publicity claimed), its loop of thirty-two minutes duration holds its audience enthralled, being the very best kind of spectacle. Not only is this seamlessly blended array of five video projections sensual - with its sweeping landscape, figure groupings, body movement, leafy textures and dramatic music - but it is thoroughly researched, being packed with much detailed historical information.

An earlier version of the work, Pursuit of Venus, was a finalist in the Singapore Art Museum's Signature Art Prize in 2014.

The exhibition was the most-visited solo exhibition by a New Zealand artist at the Auckland Art Gallery since 1997, with 49,000 visitors.

A version of the work was shown at the 12th Festival of Pacific Arts in Guam in 2016, and the National Gallery of Victoria from June to September 2016. In 2022 In Pursuit of Venus [infected] was part of the Aotearoa New Zealand Festival of the Arts from Friday 15 October – Sunday 31 July at the Museum of New Zealand Te Papa Tongarewa.

=== Venice Biennale 2017 ===
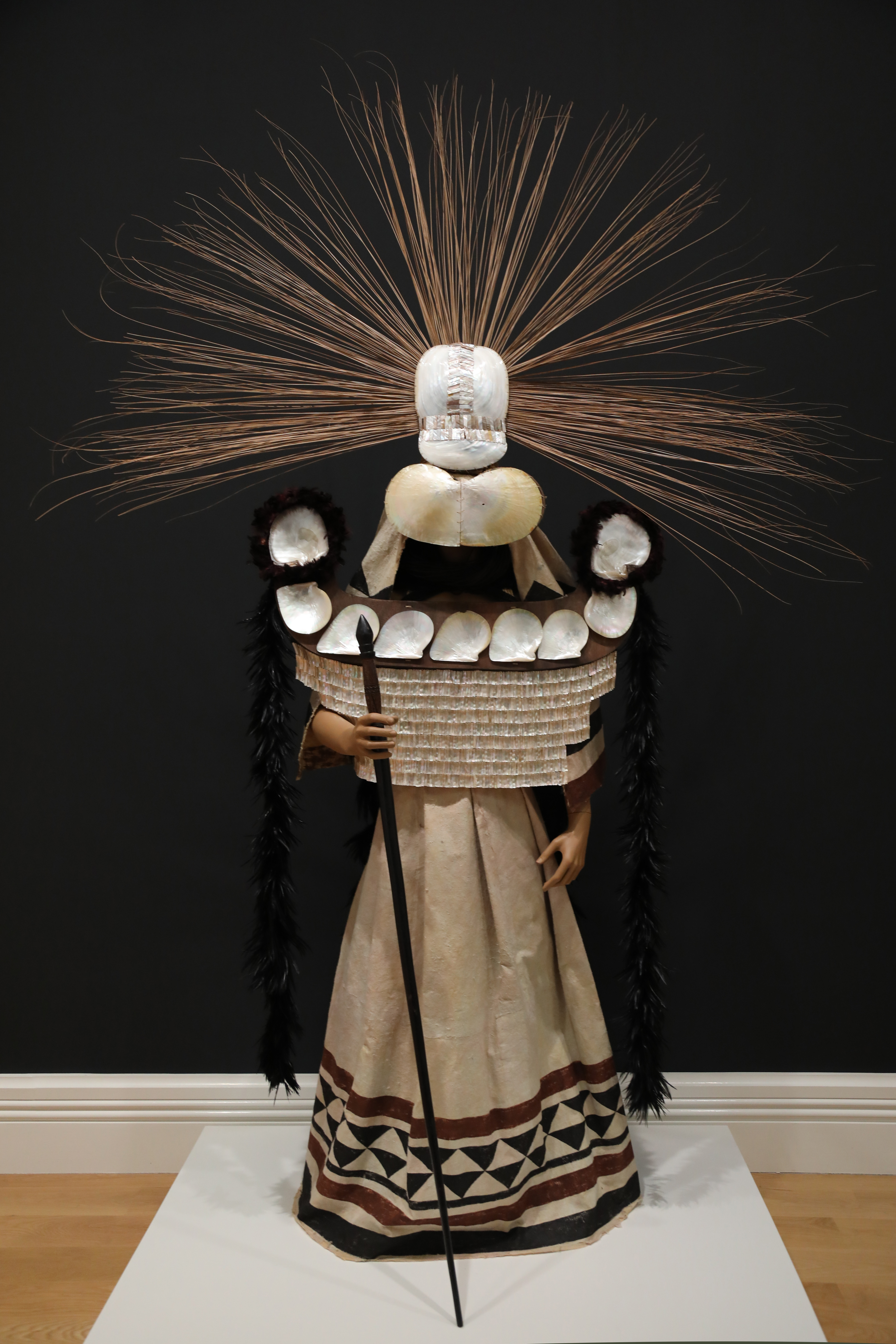
Chief Mourner, 2015, Auckland Art Gallery

Reihana represented New Zealand at the 2017 Venice Biennale, where she showed an updated version of In Pursuit of Venus [Infected] and a new suite of photographic works.

== Exhibitions ==
- 2023 He Wai Ngunguru - Nomads of the Sea Wairau Māori Art Gallery, Hundertwasser Art Centre, Whagārei, Northland
- 2022 Lisa Reihana Nomads of the Sea Pātaka, Porirua
- 2021 New Histories: Lisa Reihana and William Dunning Te Papa Tongarewa Museum of New Zealand, Wellington
- 2021 Ihi Mother and Son Milford Galleries, Dunedin
- 2019-2020 In Pursuit of Venus Kumu, Tallinn, Estonia
- 2019 in Pursuit of Venus [infected] de Young Museum, San Francisco, California, USA
- 2019 in Pursuit of Venus [infected] Honolulu Museum of Art, Honolulu, Hawaii, USA
- 2019 in Pursuit of Venus [infected] Norval Foundation South African, Cape Town, South Africa
- 2019 in Pursuit of Venus [infected] APPM Services Building, Burnie, Australia
- 2018 in Pursuit of Venus [infected] Royal Academy of Art, London, England
- 2015 in Pursuit of Venus [infected] Queensland Art Gallery, Brisbane, Australia
- 2015 in Pursuit of Venus [infected] Auckland Art Gallery, Auckland, New Zealand
- 2013 In Pursuit of Venus A-Space Gallery, Toronto, Ontario, Canada
- 2012 PELT Fehily Contemporary, Melbourne, Victoria, Australia
- 2012 Nga Hau e wha Papakura Art Gallery, Auckland, New Zealand
- 2010 Te Po o Matariki Corbans Estate, Bruce Mason Theatre, Auckland, New Zealand
- 2008 Mai i te aroha, ko te aroha Museum of New Zealand Te Papa, Wellington, New Zealand
- 2007 Native Portraits Museo Laboratoriao Arte Contemporanea, Rome, Italy
- 2007 Digital Marae Govett-Brewster Art Gallery, New Plymouth, New Zealand
- 2006 Tamaki of 100 Suitors ‘5-4-3-2-1' Auckland Art Gallery, Auckland, New Zealand
- 2006 Some Girls + Colour of Sin Snowhite Gallery, Auckland, New Zealand
- 2005 New Works Adam Art Gallery, Victoria University of Wellington, Wellington, New Zealand
- 2004 2004 the colour of sin Ramp Gallery, Hamilton, New Zealand
- 2003 Readymade Institute of Modern Art, Brisbane, Australia
- 2003 Digital Marae The Dowse Art Museum, Lower Hutt, New Zealand

=== Collections ===
Reihana's work is represented in the collections of Auckland Art Gallery, the Museum of New Zealand Te Papa Tongarewa and the Govett-Brewster Art Gallery.

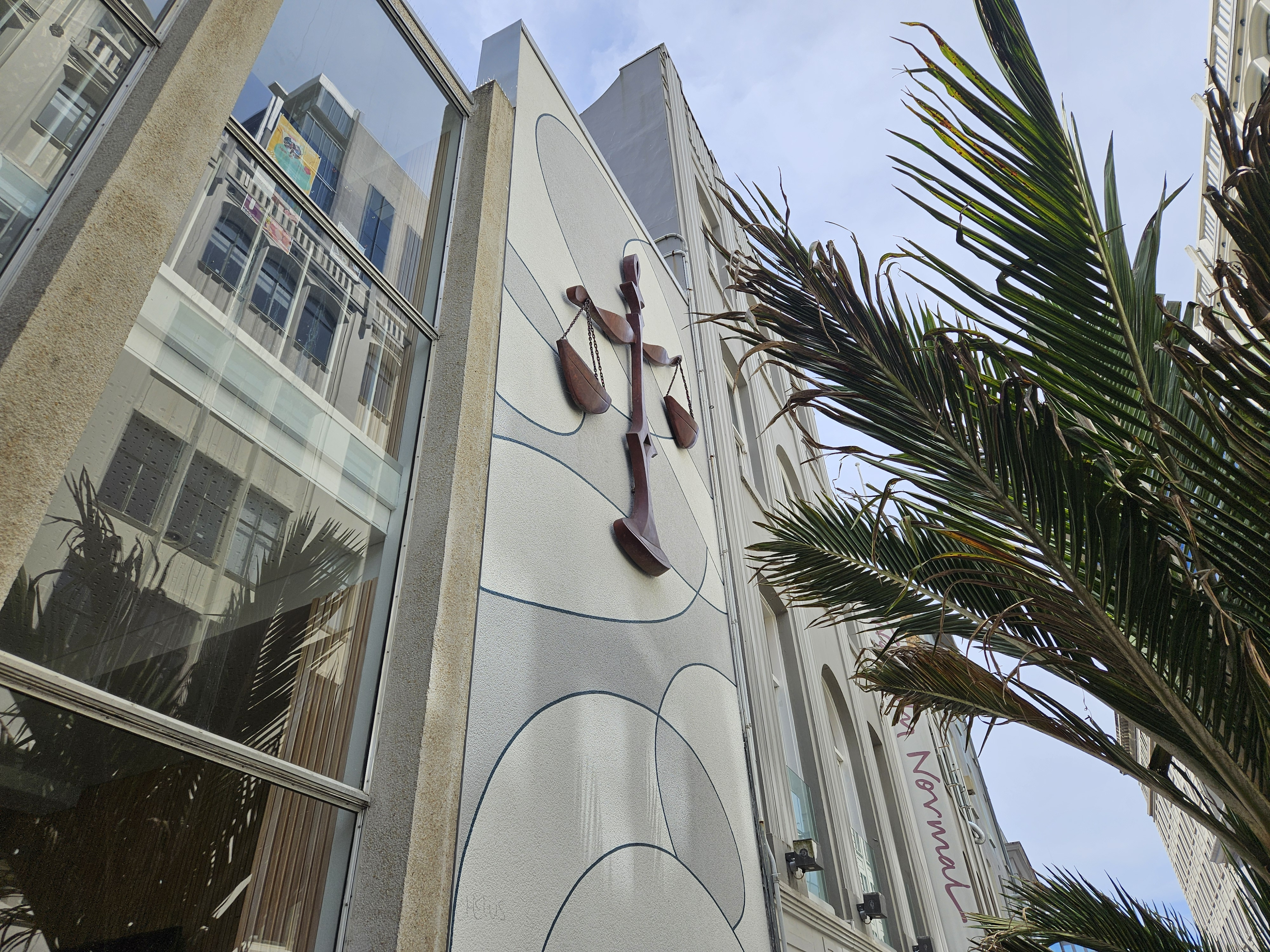
Justice (2017) at the Ellen Melville Centre, Auckland

=== Public artworks ===
Created to celebrate the life of Ellen Melville, the large bronze sculpture Justice adorns the wall of the Ellen Melville Centre in central Auckland. The work depicts the scales of justice but tipped in favour of women.

== Honours and awards ==
In 2015 Reihana was recognised with the Te Tohu Toi Kē award from Creative New Zealand for "making a positive difference to ngā toi Māori".

In the 2018 New Year Honours, Reihana was appointed a Member of the New Zealand Order of Merit for services to art. She was promoted to Companion of the New Zealand Order of Merit, for services to the arts, in the 2022 Queen's Birthday and Platinum Jubilee Honours.
