= Diane Prince (artist) =

New Zealand Māori artist

- Born: 1952 (age 73–74); Wellington, New Zealand
- Known for: Contemporary Māori art

Diane Prince (born 1952) is a painter, weaver, installation art practitioner and set designer and affiliates to the Maori iwi Ngā Puhi and Ngāti Whātua from the north of New Zealand.

== Biography ==
Prince was born in Wellington in 1952. She obtained tertiary education from Wellington Teachers' College and University of Auckland. In the 1970s, Prince was part of the Bastion Point protests including as a researcher, the protests and occupation resulted in the New Zealand Government returning the land to Ngāti Whātua in the 1980s.

Prince has been exhibiting artwork since 1986 nationally and internationally, much of her art revolves around Māori rights, especially Māori women's rights. She is often described as a multimedia artist as she creates installations, she weaves and she paints. Prince and artist Shona Rapira Davies are long time collaborators. In 1995, an installation artwork of Prince's bringing attention to New Zealand identity raised controversy leading to protests and the eventual removal of the artwork.

A solo exhibition of Prince's at the City Gallery in Wellington in 2001 is called Veiled Legacy. It was about the loss of legal status Māori women experienced once laws from Britain were imposed after the signing of the Treaty of Waitangi. The curator said of the work: 'Veiled Legacy are images of loss and alienation, but the paintings also speak of Māori women's ongoing strength and resilience'.

A number of Prince's works are in the collections at Te Papa Tongarewa The Museum of New Zealand.

== Works and exhibitions ==
- Nga Toi o te Iwi - Nga Hua o te Iwi (1988), National Library of New Zealand, group exhibition
- Diane Prince and Emare Karaka (1989), McDougall Art Annex, Christchurch Art Gallery
- Choice! Artspace, Auckland, group exhibition
- Flagging the Future: Te Kiritangata - The Last Palisade (1995)
- Korurangi: New Māori Art (1995), Auckland Art Gallery, group exhibition
- Purapurawhetu, (1997) by Briar Grace-Smith, Downstage Theatre (and touring), set designer Diane Prince and Mark McEntyre
- Women Far Walking (2000) by Witi Ihimarea, New Zealand Festival, set and costume designers Diane Prince and Mark McEntyre
- Harururu Mai (2000) by Briar Grace-Smith, New Zealand Festival, set and costume designers Diane Prince and Mark McEntyre
- Veiled Legacy (23 February - 25 March 2001), Wellington City Art Gallery, paintings by Diane Prince
- Te Aro Park - mural on public building (2011), Wellington
- Poi Poi Poi, Works by Gabrielle Belz, Diane Prince and Shona Rapira Davies (19 June - 20 July 2014), Bottle Creek Gallery, Pataka, Porirua
- Maori Art Today exhibition which accompanied Te Maori
- Mana Tiriti, Wellington City Art Gallery, group exhibition
- 1981 by John Broughton, Centrepoint Theatre, Palmerston North, set designer Diane Prince
- Commissioned woven waka, Tapu Te Ranga Marae, Island Bay, Wellington
