= Matt Te Hau =

New Zealand educationalist (1912–1978)

Matiu Te Auripo Te Hau OBE (11 July 1912 – 9 November 1978) was a notable New Zealand teacher, educationalist and community leader. Of Māori descent, he identified with the Te Whakatohea iwi. He was born in Omarumutu, Bay of Plenty, New Zealand, on 11 July 1912, and was appointed an Officer of the Order of the British Empire in the 1973 New Year Honours, for services to Māori education.

In both 1956 and 1968 he stood unsuccessfully for a seat on the Auckland City Council. He was a member of the National Party and was the Northern Maori electorate secretary in 1954 and its chairman from 1965 to 1974, and again in 1978. He served three spells as a member of its national executive as National's Maori vice president from 1963 to 1965, 1969 to 1971 and again 1975 to 1977.
