= Choice! (exhibition) =

Contemporary Māori art exhibition in Auckland, New Zealand

- Exhibition poster for Choice!
- Date: 25 July – 17 August 1990
- Venue: Artspace
- Location: Auckland
- Theme: Contemporary Māori art

Choice! was a ‘game-changing’ exhibition of contemporary Māori art curated by George Hubbard and exhibited in the Auckland gallery Artspace from 25 July to 17 August 1990.

== Context ==
In 1990 New Zealand marked the 150th anniversary of the signing of the Treaty of Waitangi. On 1 December of that year, as part of this anniversary, the National Art Gallery (now Te Papa Tongarewa) presented a large exhibition of contemporary Māori art Kohia Ko Taikaka Anake: Artists Construct New Directions in association with Ngā Puna Waihanga. Apirana Taylor said of the artists in the exhibition, ‘Their source is a traditional Māori culture and they've brought these values with them into the modern world of contemporary art.’ Four months prior, on 25 July, Artspace in Auckland launched the exhibition "Choice!" with a distinct approach to contemporary Māori art. Curator George Hubbard's argument questioned both Pākehā and Māori views on just what constituted Māori art.

== Exhibition ==
As stated in the exhibition hand-out sheet, Choice! was intended ‘To challenge viewers’ perceptions of what Māori art is or can be, and its place within New Zealand art as indigenous art ... who decides what Māori art is? Māori – it's a Māori CHOICE!’ Or, as historian Peter Brunt has put it, ‘Choice! was a critique of biculturalism...Choice! wanted to de-centre Māori art’ and in turn subvert biculturalism's simplistic view of Māori art. Art curator and writer Robert Leonard described the exhibition as, ‘game-changing’.

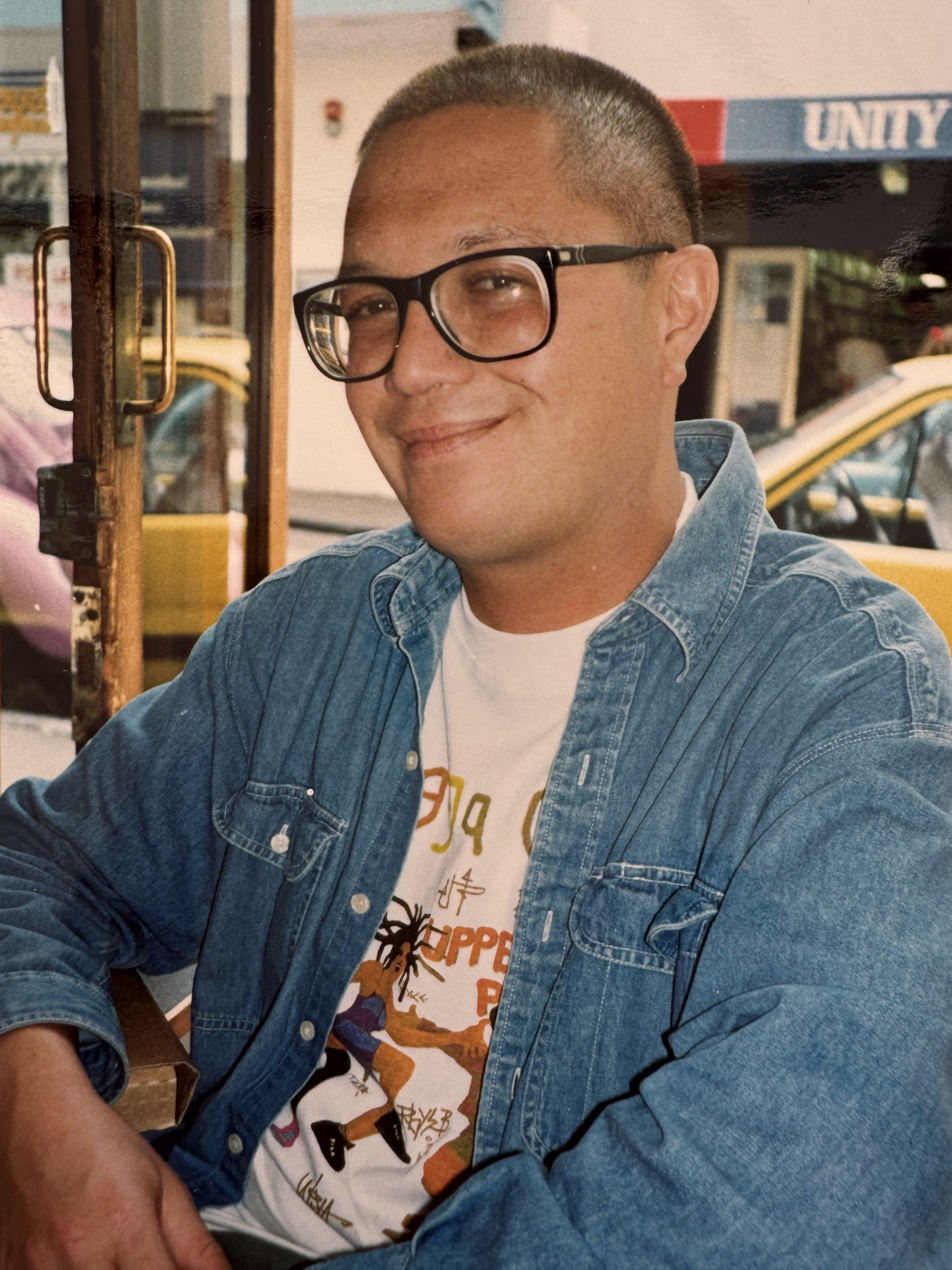
George Hubbard, Auckland 1993

== Curator ==
George Hubbard was born in 1961 and educated in Wellington. An interest in photography led him to collecting works by contemporary New Zealand photographers, and in 1985 he started working at the Wellington Arts Centre under the management of contemporary Māori artist Darcy Nicholas.

Nicholas believed in ‘encouraging contemporary Māori art’ claiming that there was ‘too much emphasis on traditional Māori art forms.’ Nicholas also allowed Hubbard to open his first gallery space by renaming the Arts Centre Hubbard's Cupboard.’ In 1989 Hubbard moved to Auckland and worked on sound tracks for artists including Lisa Reihana and et al.

== Artists and their works ==
The exhibition featured the artists Jacqueline Fraser, Rongotai Lomas, Barnard McIntyre, Michael Parekōwhai, Diane Prince, Lisa Reihana, and Darryl Thomson.

Jaqueline Fraser (Ngāi Tahu) Te Wai Ponamu (1990)

The title of Fraser's installation in Choice! references the Māori name for the South Island of New Zealand, her birthplace. Art critic Gregory Burke suggested that the Māori imagery in the work might be a reaction to Hubbard's statement that ‘Choice! was not a 'koru' show.’ He noted that, ‘Fraser's decision to use Māori symbolism for this installation is indicative of her continuing refusal to work from one point of view. Even so, the 'Māoriness' of the installation remains lightly pinned.’

Rongotai Lomas (Ngāti Hikairo, No Kāwhia Moana, No Kāwhia Kai, No Kāwhia Tangata ) Choice (1990)

Lomas was a street artist and designer. In 1996 he and Hubbard designed a set of six stamps based on Māori craft items for New Zealand Post.

Barnard McIntyre (Ngā Puhi) Untitled (1989–90)

In his review of the exhibition art writer and artist Giovanni Intra described McIntyre's work as, ‘a quiet wooden construct seemingly turning in and investigating itself….its internal structure and its façade of fake brick paper ….seems to express a vulnerability and structural frailty…’ McIntyre himself has said of his work, ‘I prefer people to have their own ideas about whatever my mixture of shapes may mean to them, but at the same time I’ve given them a lot of clues.’

Michael Parekōwhai (Ngā Riki / Te Aitanga-a-Māhaki) Four works all made in 1990 consisting of Contiki Nett 150, Atarangi:1350, Everyone will Live Quietly 4:4 Micah 1840, and Mike P ‘me etahi atu’ The Indefinite Article.

Curator and art writer Robert Leonard described Parekowhai's four works as being, ‘placed at the heart of the exhibition and its argument…They put us in a position where we have to choose whether to read them as authentic or fake, Māori or Pākehā, pure or impure, devoted or blasphemous. Our choices will be informed by things cultural, whether we can read Māori or not, are believers or disbelievers etc.’

Diane Prince (Ngā Puhi / Ngāti Whātua) Untitled (1990)

Prince's large wall work combined traditional Māori materials and techniques with their European counterparts. In reviewing the exhibition Stephen Zepke described the installation as a ‘subversion of the Pākehā / other opposition…’

Lisa Reihana (Ngāti Tahu / Ngā Puhi) Wog Features (1988-1990)

Hubbard worked with Reihana on the soundtrack for the film that features images of golliwogs, and Reihana herself dressed to showcase various stereotypical cultural roles. Art historian Roger Horrocks and film maker Shirley Horrocks noted that Reihana's work, ‘while eclectic’, showed ‘a special talent for mediating between different cultures.’

Darryl Thomson (Ngāti Kahungunu) Rap (1990), Life in the City (1990), Ozone (1990)

Thomson (known as DLT) was a spray paint bomber and a member of the hip-hop group Upper Hutt Posse that was managed by Hubbard.

== Legacy ==
In 2025 Artspace Aotearoa in Auckland acknowledged the 35th anniversary of Choice! by exhibiting Michael Parekowhai’s sculpture The Indefinite Article alongside Choice! memorabilia and with works by the Turner Prize winning artist Lubaina Himid.
