= Socialist Party of Aotearoa =

Defunct New Zealand political party

- Leader: Brendan Tuohy
- Secretary: Warren Brewer
- Founder: G. H. Andersen
- Founded: 1990
- Split from: Socialist Unity Party of New Zealand
- Preceded by: Socialist Unity Party, Communist Party of New Zealand
- Headquarters: Lyttelton, Canterbury
- Newspaper: Red Flag
- Ideology: Communism; Marxism-Leninism
- International affiliation: International Meeting of Communist and Workers' Parties
- Colours: Red
- House of Representatives: 0 / 121
- Local Government: 0 / 1,626

Website
- www.socialistparty.org.nz

The Socialist Party of Aotearoa was a minor political party in New Zealand. It was formed in 1990 through a split in the Socialist Unity Party, led by G. H. (Bill) Andersen. The last known leader of the party was Brendan Tuohy.

The party published a monthly newspaper called Red Flag. Its former members continue to operate the Workers' Institute of Scientific Socialist Education (WISSE).

The party is best known through the influence of its late founder Bill Andersen, a well-known trade unionist who served as president of the Auckland Trades Council, national secretary of the Socialist Unity Party, and president of the National Distribution Union.

It did not stand any candidates at the 2014 election.

== See also ==
- Communism
- List of Communist Parties
- Politics of New Zealand
- Socialist Unity Party of New Zealand
- Communist Party of New Zealand
- Workers Party of New Zealand
