= George Forsyth (trade unionist) =

New Zealand trade unionist and politician

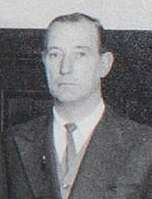
- Forsyth in 1962

Member of the Auckland City Council
- In office 17 November 1953 – 12 October 1968
- Constituency: At-large

Member of the Auckland Regional Authority
- In office 1 November 1963 – 9 October 1965
- Constituency: Auckland City

Personal details
- Born: 23 October 1898 England
- Died: 13 August 1974 (aged 75) Auckland, New Zealand
- Party: Labour Party
- Spouse: Edith Elizabeth Ellen Jordan (m. 1925; died 1972)
- Children: 1
- Profession: Trade unionist

Military service
- Allegiance: Great Britain
- Branch/service: Royal Navy
- Years of service: 1915–1930
- Rank: Petty officer
- Battles/wars: First World War

George Frederick Harry Forsyth (23 October 1898 – 13 August 1974) was a New Zealand trade unionist and politician.

== Biography ==
=== Early life ===
Forsyth was born in England in 1898. He served in the Royal Navy during World War I and fought at the Battle of Jutland, Dogger Bank, Heligoland and the Zeebrugge Raid. One of his most vivid memories from the war was meeting Colonel T. E. Lawrence whilst he was serving off the Palestinian and Syrian coast aboard the Sportive. He was subsequently a member of the King's Empire Veterans.

In 1925 he married Edith Elizabeth Ellen Jordan. During World War II he commanded the Auckland Home Guard.

=== Union and public involvement ===
He came to New Zealand in 1923 as a seamanship instructor and became active in union affairs before finally retiring from the Navy in 1930. Forsyth was an active trade unionist for 44 years until retiring as the President of the Auckland Caretakers, Cleaners, Lift Attendants and Watchmen's Union at the age of 74. By his retirement he was a life member of the union. He had also been the national President of that union and was a long time member of the Auckland Trades Council and was a delegate to 34 conferences of the Federation of Labour. He also represented New Zealand at two conferences of the International Labour Organization.

He was a member of the Auckland State Housing Allocation Committee but resigned from it in 1967 in protest against the Holyoake Government's policy on the housing of Pacific Islanders. In 1968 he proposed visiting Hanoi to try and negotiate an end to the Vietnam War.

After the Kaitawa disaster, when the MV Kaitawa sunk in 1966 losing all hands, Forsyth was chairman of the Kaitawa relief fund.

=== Political career ===
In 1953 became member of the Auckland City Council. He was re-elected in 1956 but resigned from the Labour Party in 1958 after a major disagreement with the Auckland Labour Representation Committee over his support for the council's plans to build a western bus terminal. This was against Labour Party policy who censured him for defying party policy. At the 1959 election he was elected as a Civic Reform candidate (a combined ticket of Labour and the United Independents) but in 1962 he rejoined the Labour Party and along with Alex Dreaver ran again as Labour candidates. This was part of a widening rift between Labour (Forsyth in particular) and Dove-Myer Robinson, the then Mayor of Auckland City. At the 1962 elections Forsyth campaigned for Edgar Faber, the past president of the Auckland Chamber of Commerce, who ran against Robinson.

Forsyth believed that working class people in Auckland should be given the opportunity to vote for a Labour Party candidate at every election. Despite Robinson having many policy agreements with Labour (such as improving public transport and council housing, increasing council redevelopment of the inner city's working class suburbs) he was not a Labour Party member. Consequently, Forsyth and other Labour stalwarts felt that Robinson was getting a free ride and promoted the idea of standing a Labour candidate for the mayoralty. In March 1965 Forsyth had proposed at the Auckland Labour Representation Council that the party should run a full council ticket, including a mayoral candidate. His motion was defeated, but the matter was referred to the party branches in Auckland City for their input. The branches gave favourable responses to the idea and the feeling was that the traditional Labour council ticket would be assisted by a genuine Labour mayoral candidate, which could help bring a larger number of Labour candidates to the city council. As a result Labour decided to run a mayoral candidate for the 1965 elections and Forsyth was chosen as the candidate.

During the campaign he was vocal in his criticisms of Robinson's political style and predilection for self-promotion. At one public meeting he said "Civic leaders are so busy creating an image for themselves they are forgetting the people they should be serving" and later in the campaign Forsyth was even less subtle, describing Robinson as someone "who had set himself up as a god [and] who thinks it wrong for anyone to stand against him". Forsyth finished a distant third with 3,373 votes, splitting the vote with Robinson to let the Citizens & Ratepayers candidate Roy McElroy to win by 1,134 votes. Forsyth was re-elected to the council along with Dreaver but no other Labour candidates were elected as had been predicted by Forsyth's mayoral candidature.

Ahead of the 1968 elections Robinson was invited to attend a Labour Representation Council meeting where Forsyth put it that if Robinson were to join the party and subscribe to its principles and policies, he would fully support him for mayor. Robinson declined and Forsyth withdrew his offer of conditional support. By this time however it had become clear that a Labour mayoral candidate had not brought further Labour candidates to the council as had been hoped, nor could a Labour candidate win a three-way race. Labour supporters did not view a further three years of McElroy as appealing with McElroy having no policies, except possibly in the area of council housing, that had benefited working-class people whilst Robinson's proposals to build a rapid rail system could provide them employment opportunities and cheaper transit. Forsyth and a minority of Labour members felt differently though and remained hostile to Robinson's political independence and his personal style.

After failing to convince the Labour Party to run a mayoral candidate, Forsyth did the unthinkable and decided to resign and run as an independent candidate. Labelling himself a "Labour Independent", he viewed himself as the guardian of the Labour's true principles and consequently the genuine candidate. It is speculated that he would have known his chances of victory were non-existent, but as Forsyth preferred McElroy to Robinson he was content to be the spoiler against Robinson's potential comeback candidate. Despite being members of different parties Forsyth and McElroy were friends and viewed each other as team players (contrasting to Robinson's individualistic style). Facing bitter opposition to his independent candidature Forsyth received half a dozen threatening telephone calls (who did not reveal their names) and even members of his family were abused whilst travelling publicly in buses. Forsyth said he was not worried about the callers but thought it was a "pretty poor state of affairs" that he could not offer himself as a candidate for public office in without encountering "Chicago-style opposition." Forsyth's vote fell to less than half his 1965 total and Robinson defeated McElroy. He was also defeated for a seat on the city council.

Despite having twice resigned from the party he described himself as "true to the principles of Labour and to the service of my city and my country".

Forsyth was a member of the Auckland Regional Authority, Auckland Metropolitan Drainage Board and Auckland Metropolitan Fire Board where he was chairman of the staff committee. He was also a member of the Auckland Electric Power Board and was still a member of the board at the time of his death. Earlier in 1974 he declared his intention to stand for re-election once again, but in a surprise announcement, would do so as a Citizens & Ratepayers candidate.

=== Later life and death ===
After retiring he moved to the Selwyn Village retirement complex in Point Chevalier. Forsyth died 13 August 1974 aged 75 years. He was survived by his daughter, his wife having predeceased him in 1972. He was buried at Waikumete Cemetery.

His vast personal papers were donated to the Auckland War Memorial Museum and are still housed there.
