= Betty Wark =

New Zealander social worker (1924–2001)

Elizabeth Cecilia Wark QSM (née Te Wheao, 6 June 1924–16 May 2001) was a New Zealand social worker and politician.

== Biography ==
=== Early life and family ===
Wark was born at Omanaia in 1924 to unmarried parents; Cyril Chapman and Nau (Mabel) Rini Te Wheao who was of Ngāpuhi descent. Raised in a foster home she did not meet her biological parents until she was in her twenties. Her Catholic foster home was not a happy one where her bedroom was a storage shed and her foster father was abusive. She attended Motutī Native School and in 1938 she received a government scholarship to attend St Joseph's Māori Girls' College, Napier. There the school emphasized service to humanity and a spiritual path in life. The nuns who taught her provided her strong female role models, crediting them with giving her a moral base, integrity and social conscience.

After leaving school in 1941 she became a trainee nurse at Wairoa. After six months she became a housekeeper in Napier. She met Charles Turner, an American marine, at a dance and later got engaged. Wark became pregnant soon before Turner was killed in action in the Pacific. She gave birth to her and Turner's son in Wellington in 1944. At that time there were few welfare provisions, employment or childcare opportunities for mothers who were unwed. Placing her son in the care of family, she moved to Auckland seeking employment, working as a ward maid at Auckland Hospital and a waitress. In 1948 she had a second son with Henry Smith, who later returned to his native England. She moved to Waihi, where her second son was raised by a local family while she continued to work, returning to Auckland in 1950 was employed in a clerical position. In Auckland she met Conrad Kenneth Powell, a Canadian merchant mariner, at a dance whom she married on 28 May 1951. In 1952 she gave birth to her third son. Powell decided to return to Canada, Wark chose to remain in New Zealand. This time she was able to keep her son, being entitled to a deserted wife's benefit. In the mid-1950s she met Englishman, James Gordon (Jim) Wark. She had two sons with Wark in 1959 and 1961. She divorced Powell and married Jim Wark on 21 November 1966 at Auckland which gave her a stable home life for the first time.

=== Social work ===
Wark and her family moved to the inner Auckland suburb of Freemans Bay. During the Māori renaissance in the 1960s and 1970s she became involved in the urban Māori movement. She was an active member of the Ponsonby branch of the Māori Women's Welfare League (MWWL) and the Ponsonby Māori Community Centre. Through her community work she assisted young residents of Freemans Bay who were being displaced by gentrification in the suburb. She helped establish a hostel for young Māori who had been uprooted by urban renewal which was supported by the MWWL and the Catholic church. In 1974 Wark was part of the establishment of Arohanui Incorporated, a community-based organisation to provide accommodation and assistance to youth referred from the justice and welfare system. Separating from her husband in 1976, the same year she opened Arohanui hostel in Ponsonby, running the hostel with her youngest son. The hostel grew and with government funding literacy and numeracy classes as well as rehabilitating people with substance addictions.

In 1986 a documentary, Give me a Love, was made about her directed by Bill Saunders. The documentary displayed one month in the life of Arohanui for the audience. Wark was awarded the Queen's Service Medal in the 1986 New Year Honours.

=== Political career ===
At the 1971 and 1974 local-body elections she stood as a Labour Party candidate for the Auckland City Council, but was unsuccessful on both occasions. At the 1986 election he was elected to the council in the Ponsonby ward. She never felt comfortable as a councillor, often feeling isolated as the council's only Māori woman. She focused on working with people and on housing issues.

=== Later life and death ===
Wark was diagnosed with lung cancer in June 2000, but continued to work until she was unable to do so. Wark died on 16 May 2001, aged 76. After a requiem mass in Auckland her body was taken to Hokianga where she was buried.

A room at the Ellen Melville Centre in Auckland is named after her.
