= Lindo Ferguson (ophthalmologist, born 1923) =

New Zealand ophthalmologist and politician (1923–2014)

Lindo Ferguson CBE JP

16th Deputy Mayor of Auckland
- In office 10 November 1971 – 31 October 1977
- Mayor: Dove-Myer Robinson
- Preceded by: Max Tongue
- Succeeded by: Jolyon Firth

Personal details
- Born: 27 February 1923 Waimate, New Zealand
- Died: 19 January 2014 (aged 90) Far North District, New Zealand
- Spouse: Laetitia Bell
- Relations: Lindo Ferguson (grandfather)
- Children: 2
- Profession: Ophthalmologist

Richard Henry Lindo Ferguson CBE JP (27 February 1923 − 19 January 2014) was a New Zealand ophthalmologist and politician.

== Early life and career ==
Ferguson was born in 1923 in Waimate. He was educated at John McGlashan College and Christ's College. He studied at the University of Otago, graduating in 1947 with a Bachelor of Medicine. His grandfather was the noted ophthalmologist Sir Lindo Ferguson. He entered his family profession and became an eye surgeon.

In 1954 he married Laetitia Margaret Bell with whom he had one son and one daughter.

From 1950 to 1952 he practiced at Moorfields Eye Hospital in London. He then became the visiting ophthalmic surgeon at Auckland Hospital in 1960. He was president of the New Zealand Ophthalmological Society.

== Political career ==
Ferguson was concerned about the loss of heritage buildings in Auckland which motivated him to enter local body politics. He worked to preserve and restore several historic buildings such as Ewelme Cottage, Kinder House, Highwic, and the old Customs House. In 1968 he was elected a member of the Auckland City Councillor on the Citizens & Ratepayers (C&R) ticket. He was deputy mayor from 1971 to 1977. At the 1974 election Grahame Sims, the retiring town clerk, ran for mayor and accused Dove-Myer Robinson of being a C&R stooge. This followed Ferguson endorsing Robinson for the mayoralty. Sims called it "seat warming", insinuating Ferguson would run for mayor at the next election. Despite Sims' prediction Ferguson did not stand for mayor (or re-election to the council) in 1977.

He was also a member of the Auckland Regional Authority (ARA), first elected in 1977. He later served a period as deputy chairman of the ARA.

== Later life and death ==
Ferguson was involved in a large number of local trusts, societies and boards. He was chairman of the Cornwall Park Trust Board, chairman of the St John Ambulance Trust Board, director of the Rotary Club of Auckland, member of the Mackelvie Trust, chancellor of the University of Auckland and president of Auckland War Memorial Museum. He was also a justice of the peace.

In 1970 he purchased a near derelict property in Butler Point, Mangonui that was once owned by Captain William Butler. He and his wife spent the next 40 years restoring and refurbishing it.

In the 1987 New Year Honours, he was appointed a Commander of the Order of the British Empire, for services to medicine, education, local government and the community.

Ferguson died in the Far North District in 2014, aged 90. His wife Laetitia died in 2019.

== Citations ==
Political offices
Preceded by Max Tongue	Deputy Mayor of Auckland; 1971–1977	Succeeded by Jolyon Firth
Academic offices
Preceded by Graham Speight	Chancellor of the University of Auckland; 1981–1986	Succeeded by Mick Brown
