= HMS Sportive =

Royal Navy S class destroyer

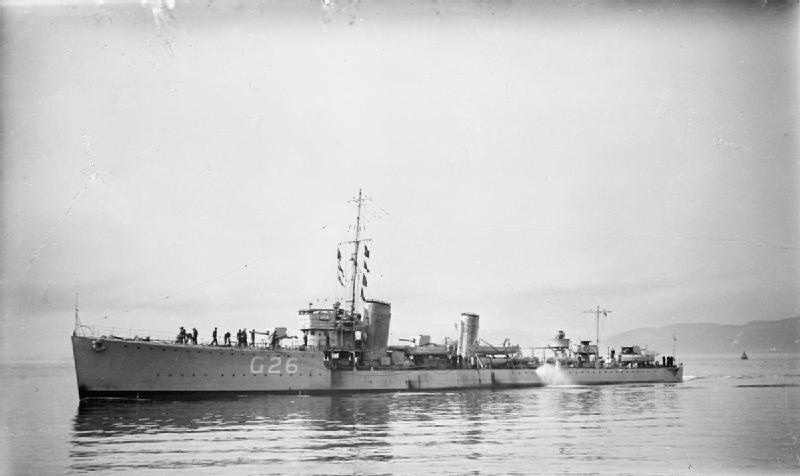
- Sister ship Sepoy in c. 1918

History

United Kingdom
- Name: Sportive
- Namesake: Sportive
- Ordered: 7 April 1917
- Builder: Swan Hunter, Wallsend
- Laid down: February 1918
- Launched: 19 September 1918
- Completed: December 1918
- Out of service: 22 July 1936
- Fate: Sold to be broken up

General characteristics
- Class & type: S-class destroyer
- Displacement: 1,075 long tons (1,092 t) normal; 1,221 long tons (1,241 t) deep load
- Length: 265 ft (80.8 m) p.p.
- Beam: 26 ft 8 in (8.13 m)
- Draught: 9 ft 10 in (3 m) mean
- Propulsion: 3 Yarrow boilers; 2 geared Parsons steam turbines, 27,000 shp
- Speed: 36 knots (41.4 mph; 66.7 km/h)
- Range: 2,750 nmi (5,090 km) at 15 kn (28 km/h)
- Complement: 90
- Armament: 3 × single QF 4 in (102 mm) guns; 1 × single 2-pdr 40 mm (1.6 in) AA gun; 2 × twin 21 in (533 mm) torpedo tubes; 2 × single 18 in (457 mm) torpedo tubes; 4 × depth charge chutes

HMS Sportive was an Admiralty S-class destroyer that served with the Royal Navy in the Russian Civil War. The S class was a development of the First World War-era R class, designed as a cheaper alternative to the V and W classes that had followed them. Launched in 1918 shortly before the Armistice, the ship was commissioned into the Fourteenth Destroyer Flotilla of the Grand Fleet before joining the Fourth Destroyer Flotilla of the Mediterranean Fleet in 1919. The destroyer assisted in the evacuation of the Crimea, helping to rescue about 1,500 people from Odessa in 1920, and supported intelligence officers, including Reginald Teague-Jones, working in the region. Placed in the Reserve Fleet, Sportive was retired and, in 1936, sold to be broken up in Inverkeithing in exchange for the liner Majestic.

== Design and development ==
Sportive was one of 33 Admiralty S-class destroyers ordered by the British Admiralty on 7 April 1917 as part of the Eleventh War Construction Programme. They were built to a design specified by the Admiralty and so were known as "Admiralty destroyers". This design was a development of the R class that were also built to an Admiralty specification. The S-class destroyers were to be introduced at the same time as, and as a cheaper and faster alternative to, the V and W classes. They were to serve as general-purpose ships in the Harwich Force while the more powerful V and W classes would be deployed to support the Grand Fleet at Scapa Flow. Differences from the R class were minor, such as having the searchlight moved aft and the ability to mount an additional pair of torpedo tubes. The destroyers were known as the Modified Trenchard or S class, as the majority were named starting with the letter S.

The destroyer had a overall length of 276 ft (84.1 m) and a length of 265 ft (80.8 m) between perpendiculars. Beam was 26 ft 8 in (8.13 m) and mean draught 9 ft 10 in (3 m). Displacement was 1,075 long tons (1,092 t) normal and 1,221 long tons (1,241 t) deep load. Three Yarrow boilers fed steam to two sets of Parsons geared steam turbines rated at 27,000 shaft horsepower (20,000 kW) and driving two shafts, giving a design speed of 36 knots (67 km/h; 41 mph) at normal loading and 32.5 knots (60.2 km/h; 37.4 mph) at deep load. Two funnels were fitted. A full load of 301 long tons (306 t) of fuel oil was carried, which gave a design range of 2,750 nautical miles (5,090 km; 3,160 mi) at 15 knots (28 km/h; 17 mph). The ship had a complement of 90 officers and ratings.

Armament consisted of three QF 4 in (102 mm) Mk IV guns on the ship's centreline. One was mounted raised on the forecastle, one on a platform between the funnels, and one aft. The ship was also armed with a single 2-pounder 40 mm (1.6 in) "pom-pom" anti-aircraft gun for air defence. Four 21 in (533 mm) torpedo tubes were carried in two twin rotating mounts aft. Four depth charge chutes were also fitted aft. Initially, typically ten depth charges were carried. The ship mounted two additional 18 in (457 mm) torpedo tubes either side of the superstructure, controlled by the commander with toggle ropes. Fire control included a training-only director, single Dumaresq and a Vickers range clock.

== Construction and career ==
Laid down on 19 February 1918 during the First World War by Swan Hunter & Wigham Richardson at their dockyard in Wallsend on the River Tyne with the yard number 1035, Sportive was launched on 9 August 1918 and completed in December shortly after the Armistice that ended the war. The vessel was the only one in Royal Navy service with the name. Sportive was commissioned into the Grand Fleet, joining the Fourteenth Destroyer Flotilla. Although the war had ended, fighting then started between Greece and Turkey and, in Russia, the civil war continued. The United Kingdom decided to send units of the Royal Navy to the front line. Sportive was one of the ships chosen. On 3 March 1919, the destroyer departed Devonport for Gibraltar as part of the Fourth Destroyer Flotilla to serve with the Mediterranean Fleet. On 28 October, the ship left for Smyrna.

On 30 January 1920, Sportive was based in Odessa and, on 6 February, fired at cavalry of the Red Army attacking the city. The ship then evacuated between 750 and 800 military personnel and civilians, including members of the Cadet Corps, from the city, arriving, on 3 February, in Constantinople. The ship then returned, evacuating an additional 700 from the city. After being recommissioned in Malta on 17 June, the destroyer was dispatched back to Constantinople on 20 June as tensions escalated in the wake of the fall of the Ottoman Empire. While there, the ship supported intelligence officers working in the region, including Reginald Teague-Jones. The destroyer returned to England on 24 August 1923 and subsequently participated in the Fleet Review that took place in the presence of George V on 26 July 1924.

Sportive was placed in the Reserve Fleet at The Nore on 5 March 1928. Like many of the class stored in reserve, the ship deteriorated and by the middle of the next decade was considered by the Admiralty to be in too poor condition to return to operations. Sportive was therefore chosen as one of twenty-two destroyers which were given to Thos. W. Ward of Sheffield in exchange for the liner Majestic. The ship was sold on 25 September 1936 and subsequently broken up at Inverkeithing.

== Pennant numbers ==
Penant numbers
Pennant number	Date
G48	September 1918
F21	November 1919
D12	October 1921
