= Socialist Unity Party of New Zealand =

Defunct political party in New Zealand

- Founded: 1966
- Dissolved: 1990
- Split from: Communist Party of New Zealand
- Ideology: Communism; Marxism–Leninism
- Political position: Far-left
- Colours: Red

The Socialist Unity Party of New Zealand was one of the better-known Marxist-Leninist parties in New Zealand. It had a certain amount of influence in the trade union movement, but never won seats in Parliament.

== History ==
The Socialist Unity Party was founded in 1966 as a splinter group of the Communist Party. The Communist Party had been bitterly divided by the Sino-Soviet Split, a dispute between the Soviet Union under Nikita Khrushchev and China under Mao Zedong. The party eventually decided to take China's side. Shortly afterwards, a number of the more prominent supporters of the Soviet position, such as Ken Douglas, George Jackson and Bill Andersen, established the Socialist Unity Party. The Socialist Unity Party retained ideological and political links to the Soviet Union for most of its existence.

The Socialist Unity Party's association with the Soviet government drew considerable criticism from mainstream politicians. In 1980, the Soviet ambassador to New Zealand, Vsevolod Sofinsky, was expelled after allegedly giving $10,000 to a member of the Socialist Unity Party. In 1987, another Soviet diplomat, Sergei Budnik, was ordered to leave the country by Prime Minister David Lange for his alleged involvement with the party.

At the same time, the Socialist Unity Party was strongly condemned by other communist groups, which accused it of not following "true" communism and of collaborating with capitalists. The Socialist Unity Party's most well known leader, Ken Douglas, was also criticised by hardliners for the comparatively moderate position he took within the trade union movement.

The Socialist Unity Party, unlike some of the more radical groups, participated in New Zealand elections, and was not wholly antagonistic to mainstream parties — it was prepared, for example, to occasionally support the Labour Party as "the lesser of two evils". The party put forward candidates in four elections; generally in safe Labour seats in the four main centres; except for Franklin and Stratford in the 1975 election and Waikato in the 1981 election. However Bill Andersen stood against Rob Muldoon in Tamaki four times.

The Socialist Unity Party has now dissolved, although the Socialist Party of Aotearoa (now also defunct), which split from the Socialist Unity Party in 1990, continued for a number of years afterwards into the early 2010s.

== Electoral results (1972–1981) ==
Election	candidates	seats won	votes	percentage
1972	5	0	444	0.03
1975	15	0	408	0.03
1978	4	0	179	0.01
1981	5	0	447	0.02
