= Bill Andersen =

New Zealand communist, social activist, and trade union leader

Gordon Harold "Bill" Andersen (21 January 1924 – 19 January 2005) was a New Zealand communist, social activist and trade union leader.

== Biography ==
Andersen was born in Auckland on 21 January 1924, the youngest child of Hans (Skip) Andersen and Minnie Boneham. He was educated at Panmure School.

Andersen was one of the participants in the 1951 Waterfront Lockout and the president of the Northern Drivers' Union and later the National Distribution Union. He was later the president of the Socialist Unity Party, which broke away from the Communist Party of New Zealand over the Sino-Soviet split, and he also led its successor, the Socialist Party of Aotearoa.

Andersen's opposition to then National Party Prime Minister Robert Muldoon made him a household name in New Zealand during the 1970s. He stood for parliament in the safe National seat of Tamaki against Muldoon in the 1972, 1975, 1978 and 1981 elections, receiving 108, 39, 62 and 188 votes respectively. Whenever the two flew from Auckland to Wellington, sympathetic NAC and Air New Zealand staff ensured the two leaders were seated next to each other.

Bill Andersen supported the Ngāti Whātua occupation of Bastion Point, now the site of Ōrākei marae. He organised union support for the Māori claiming ownership of the land.

He remained an active trade unionist all his life. In May 2003 he was arrested on a picket line for obstruction. He kept working at the National Distribution Union and Northern Drivers Charitable Trust until the week of his death.

Andersen died on 19 January 2005 aged 80. Despite requests for no funeral, a large group gathered for a memorial ceremony to him at Ōrākei Marae which was attended by workers and activists as well as cabinet ministers, local councillors and mayors.

He is the great-uncle of Labour MP Ginny Andersen.
