= Jafa =

Resident of Auckland, New Zealand

Jafa is a slang term (sometimes pejorative) for a resident of Auckland, New Zealand. It is an acronym, standing for Just Another Fucking Aucklander. This prejudice against Aucklanders started to appear around the 1900s, when Premier Richard John Seddon referred to Aucklanders as "Rangitoto Yanks," and is considered to be representative of the boorishness of Aucklanders, or the envy of the rest of New Zealand, depending on the perspective. The term is also misspelled as Jaffa, a chocolate confection from Dunedin, and is often used in sentences which render the original term useless in the grammatical sense. The term has wider currency than the earlier derogatory term "Rangitoto Yank". A variant is Jaffa, Just Another Fuckwit From Auckland.

== Origins ==
The word Jafa often conveys dislike for Aucklanders. While only a small part of New Zealand geographically, Auckland makes up 29% of the population of New Zealand, by far the largest city, and has greater economic power (mainly through the centralisation of many companies) than its population share would indicate.

Other factors in the use of the word:

- Auckland is alleged to dominate in national politics and society, a claim possibly somewhat overstated, as much of the political power is concentrated in Wellington, the country's capital. In terms of society recognition, Wellingtonians are also more than twice as likely to be selected to receive Commonwealth honours such as those on the New Year's Honour List.
- Auckland is alleged to receive more than its fair share of government funds, though often in the past, as in 2005, it "received less than its share in terms of its proportion of total population", and a report in 1991 showed that out of $150 million in fuel taxes, only $84 million had come back to the Auckland Region in transport investment.
- Auckland is alleged to be a drain on the national economy. In fact, it is the main business centre in the country, but rural New Zealand produces the agricultural majority of the nation's exports. Auckland produces around 35 percent of New Zealand's GDP, however on a per-capita basis, it is second behind only Wellington.
- Auckland is alleged to be full of rude, greedy and arrogant people, having a similar reputation as Mumbai and Kolkata in India, Milan and Rome in Italy, Paris in France, London in the United Kingdom, New York City in the United States, Jakarta in Indonesia, or Moscow and St. Petersburg in Russia.
- Auckland is alleged to be full of cars and especially SUVs (often referred to by detractors as 'Remuera Tractors', with Remuera being the stereotypical 'rich people's suburb'), and its drivers preferring them to other types of transportation, but Aucklanders use them less than the rural population.
- Auckland is alleged to be a culturally alien place due to the much higher proportion of non-Māori and nonwhite populations than the rest of the country. Percentage-wise, Auckland has the seventh largest ethnic Chinese population among all urban areas outside Greater China. In the 2006 census, Asians comprised 18.9% of Auckland's population but only 7.9% in Christchurch, and 14.4% of Auckland's but merely 2.8% of Christchurch's population are Pacific Islanders. Most new immigrants to Auckland are from East Asia and South Asia, while people immigrating to other parts of the country show higher percentage rates of UK and South African origins. Auckland is finding itself increasingly marginalised on sports traditionally identified with New Zealand culture, such as rugby and netball, because of high immigrant numbers from countries with little tradition of such sports.
- Auckland is one of the few areas in New Zealand that has the traffic volumes associated with a major city. Most of New Zealand, including other cities, has a rural traffic pattern. This has given rise to the idea that 'Auckland Drivers' are overly aggressive.

== Use in Auckland ==
- In 1999 the Tourism Auckland organisation launched a "Jafa" advertising campaign.
- Aucklanders initially adopted the word ironically.
- The New Zealand Herald, the main Northern North Island (encompassing Northland, Greater Auckland, and Waikato) daily newspaper, now sometimes uses "Jafa" as a nickname for Aucklanders without any hint of irony.
- This use of "Jafa" amongst Aucklanders, as a positive, self-referential term, has led to the reinterpretation of the acronym by some to mean Just Another Fabulous Aucklander.
- In 2004, mayor Dick Hubbard launched a free JafaCab service for the Auckland CBD, by driving a cab down Queen St. The occupants were Nicky Watson and Santa.
- From 2005 onwards, there have been some Aucklanders using this term with civic pride, as part of the general trend of rising self-confidence among the local residents identifying with the city.
- The term Jafa is also used in the name of an independent student-owned film / media group, Jafa TV Productions, run by students of the University of Auckland and Auckland University of Technology. It describes itself as "an interactive hub where independent filmmakers network with other filmmakers freely and directly".

== Related words and sayings ==
- "New Zealand stops (or starts) at the Bombay Hills" – used by Aucklanders and non-Aucklanders alike
- "Jafaland", "J'land", "Jafastan" / "Jafastani" – Auckland / Aucklander
- "Queen Street Farmer" – Urban businessman with rural investments and supposedly little understanding of rural life
- "Remuera Tractor" – An SUV vehicle.
- "The Bridge" – referring to the Auckland Harbour Bridge, usually in connection with traffic issues
- "Rangitoto Yanks" – An old term which suggested a rude obnoxious American-styled person from Auckland. Was made more popular when Auckland's motorways and high-rises were first built
- "Jafugee" – a former resident of Auckland who has moved to nearby city, such as Tauranga, due to the high cost of living in Auckland

== Use in advertising ==
- Transit NZ had a road safety campaign on State Highway 2 using the term "JAFA" – "Just Another Fatigued Aucklander"
- Transit NZ also ran a similar road safety campaign running north from Hastings using the term "JAFA" as "Just Another Fatal Accident"
- In the name of an Auckland taxi company, "Jafacabs"

== Other uses ==
It has been claimed in one 2007 tourist article that in the United Kingdom, the term JAFA has also come to stand for Just Another Fucking Australian, apparently in reference to the hard drinking and allegedly arrogant behaviour of many travelling Australians.

The acronym is also used, particularly by Australian Antarctic personnel, for Just Another Fucking Academic.

== See also ==
- Bombay Hills, New Zealand
- Helengrad (pejorative term for New Zealand's capital city (Wellington), referring to Helen Clark)
- South Island nationalism
