= Tamil New Zealanders =

Ethnic group in New Zealand

Total population
- 12,474 (2023)

Languages
- Tamil; New Zealand English

Religion
- Hinduism; Christianity; Islam

Related ethnic groups
- Sri Lankan Tamils; Indian Tamils

Tamil New Zealanders are New Zealand citizens and residents of Tamil ethnicity or ancestry. As of 2023, an estimated number of 12,474 Tamils currently reside in the country. In the 2013 New Zealand census, there were 303 Indian Tamils and 732 Sri Lankan Tamils who were usually residents.

== Notable Tamil New Zealanders ==
- Brannavan Gnanalingam - Novelist and film critic
- Ahi Karunaharan - Actor, Writer, Director, Musician and Producer
- Mayu Pasupati, Jaffna-born New Zealand cricketer
- Vanushi Walters - Human rights activist, lawyer, and politician
- Kumar Velambalam - President of the New Zealand Sri Lanka Foundation
- Suren Sivalingam JP - Justice of the Peace. Trustee of the Pillayar Kovil Trust, Treasurer of the Canta Lankans Association, Former Secretary, Treasurer of Canterbury TAMIL Society

== Tamil Societies ==
•

- Canterbury Indian Tamil Association
- Canterbury TAMIL Society
- Wellington Tamil Society Inc
- Wellington Muthamizh Sangam
- New Zealand Tamil Society
- Auckland Tamil Association Inc
- Dunedin Tamil Society
- Muth Tamil Sangam Inc.
- Tamil Society Waikato Incorporated
