= Helen Clark =

Prime Minister of New Zealand from 1999 to 2008

The Right Honourable Helen Clark ONZ SSI PC
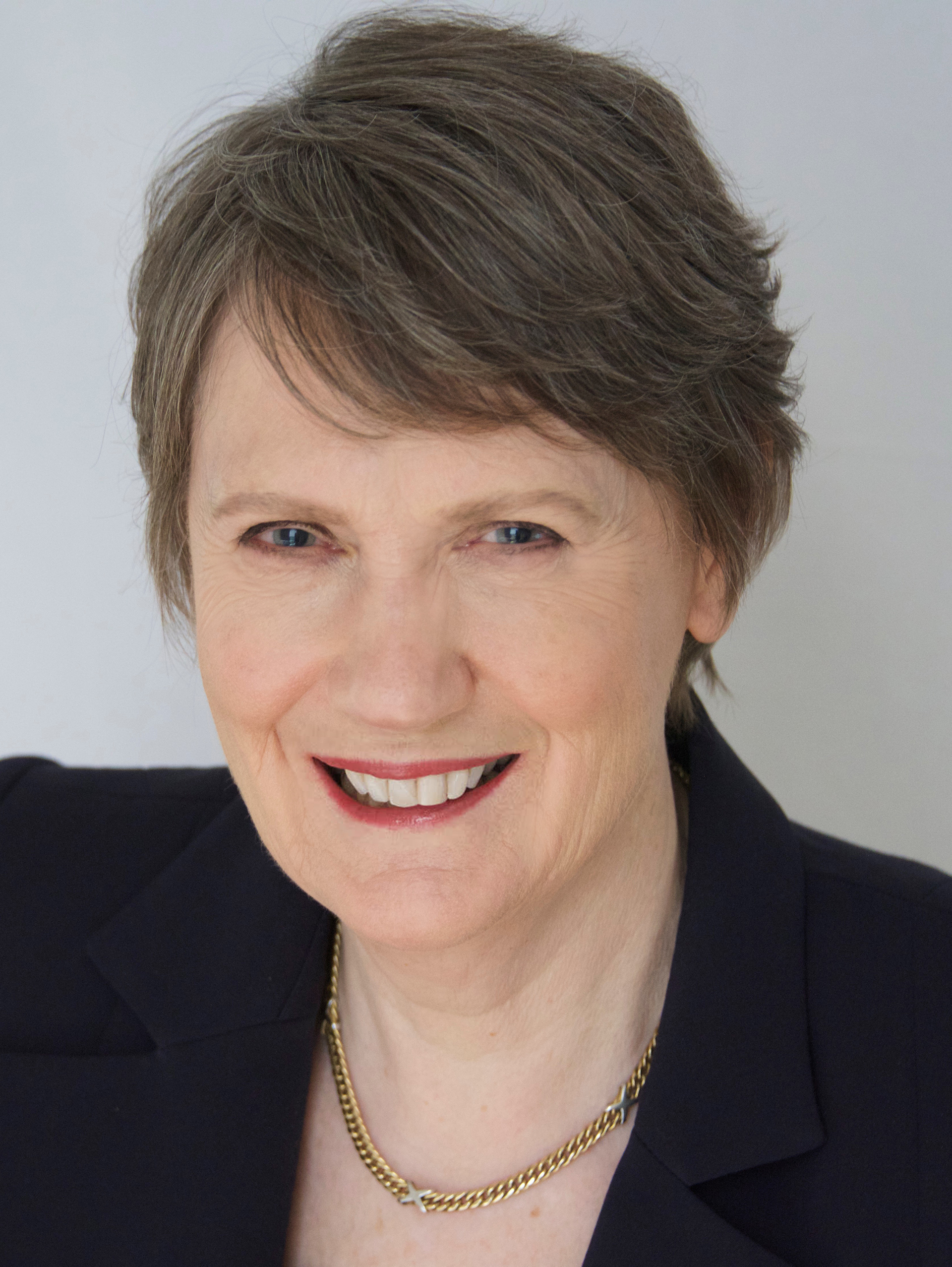
- Clark in 2016

37th Prime Minister of New Zealand
- In office 10 December 1999 – 19 November 2008
- Monarch: Elizabeth II
- Governors-General: Michael Hardie Boys; Silvia Cartwright; Anand Satyanand
- Deputy: Jim Anderton; Michael Cullen
- Preceded by: Jenny Shipley
- Succeeded by: John Key

8th Administrator of the United Nations Development Programme
- In office 17 April 2009 – 19 April 2017
- Secretary-General: Ban Ki-moon; António Guterres
- Preceded by: Kemal Derviş
- Succeeded by: Achim Steiner

Minister of Foreign Affairs
- Acting; 29 August 2008 – 19 November 2008
- Preceded by: Winston Peters
- Succeeded by: Murray McCully

27th Leader of the Opposition
- In office 1 December 1993 – 10 December 1999
- Prime Minister: Jim Bolger; Jenny Shipley
- Deputy: David Caygill; Michael Cullen
- Preceded by: Mike Moore
- Succeeded by: Jenny Shipley

12th Leader of the Labour Party
- In office 1 December 1993 – 11 November 2008
- Deputy: David Caygill; Michael Cullen
- Preceded by: Mike Moore
- Succeeded by: Phil Goff

11th Deputy Prime Minister of New Zealand
- In office 8 August 1989 – 2 November 1990
- Prime Minister: Geoffrey Palmer; Mike Moore
- Preceded by: Geoffrey Palmer
- Succeeded by: Don McKinnon

11th Deputy Leader of the Labour Party
- In office 8 August 1989 – 1 December 1993
- Leader: Geoffrey Palmer; Mike Moore
- Preceded by: Geoffrey Palmer
- Succeeded by: David Caygill

29th Minister of Health
- In office 30 January 1989 – 2 November 1990
- Prime Minister: David Lange; Geoffrey Palmer; Mike Moore
- Preceded by: David Caygill
- Succeeded by: Simon Upton

Member of the New Zealand Parliament for Mount Albert Owairaka (1996–1999)
- In office 28 November 1981 – 17 April 2009
- Preceded by: Warren Freer
- Succeeded by: David Shearer

Personal details
- Born: Helen Elizabeth Clark; 26 February 1950 (age 76) Te Pahu, New Zealand
- Party: Labour
- Spouse: Peter Davis (m. 1981)
- Parent(s): Frederick George Clark; Margaret McMurray
- Education: University of Auckland

Helen Elizabeth Clark ONZ SSI PC (born 26 February 1950) is a New Zealand politician who served as the 37th prime minister of New Zealand from 1999 to 2008 and was the administrator of the United Nations Development Programme from 2009 to 2017. She was New Zealand's fifth-longest-serving prime minister, and the second woman to hold that office.

Clark was brought up on a farm outside Hamilton. She entered the University of Auckland in 1968 to study politics and became active in the New Zealand Labour Party. After graduating she lectured in political studies at the university. Clark entered local politics in 1974 in Auckland but was not elected to any position. Following one unsuccessful attempt, she was elected to Parliament in 1981 as the member for Mount Albert, an electorate she represented until 2009.

Clark held numerous Cabinet positions in the Fourth Labour Government, including minister of housing, minister of health and minister of conservation. She was the 11th deputy prime minister of New Zealand from 1989 to 1990 serving under prime ministers Geoffrey Palmer and Mike Moore. After Labour's narrow defeat in the 1993 election, Clark challenged Moore for leadership of the party and won, becoming the leader of the Opposition. Following the 1999 election, Labour formed a governing coalition, and Clark was sworn in as prime minister on 10 December 1999.

Clark led the Fifth Labour Government, which implemented several major economic initiatives including Kiwibank, the New Zealand Superannuation Fund, the New Zealand Emissions Trading Scheme and KiwiSaver. Her government also introduced the Foreshore and Seabed Act 2004, which caused major controversy. In foreign affairs, Clark sent troops to the Afghanistan War, but did not contribute combat troops to the Iraq War, and ordered deployment to the 2006 East Timorese crisis. She was ranked by Forbes as the 20th-most powerful woman in the world in 2006. She advocated a number of free-trade agreements with major trading partners, including becoming the first developed nation to sign such an agreement with China. After three successive electoral victories, her government was defeated in the 2008 election; Clark resigned as prime minister and party leader on 19 November 2008. She was succeeded as prime minister by John Key of the National Party, and as leader of the Labour Party by Phil Goff.

Clark resigned from Parliament in April 2009 to become the first female head of the United Nations Development Programme (UNDP). In 2016, she stood for the position of secretary-general of the United Nations, but was unsuccessful. She left her UNDP administrator post on 19 April 2017 at the end of her second four-year term and was succeeded by Achim Steiner. In 2019, Clark became the patron of the Helen Clark Foundation.

== Early life ==
Clark was the eldest of four daughters of a farming family at Te Pahu, west of Hamilton, in the Waikato. Her mother, Margaret McMurray, of Irish birth, was a primary school teacher. Her father, Frederick George Clark, who went by the name George, was born in Frankton in 1922 and ran the Clarks' farm from his early adulthood to retirement in 1987, when the elder Clarks retired to Waihi Beach. Margaret Clark died in 2017 at the age of 87. George Clark died in 2025 at the age of 103.

Clark studied at Te Pahu Primary School, at Epsom Girls' Grammar School in Auckland and at the University of Auckland, where she majored in politics and graduated with an MA (Honours) in 1974. Her thesis focused on rural political behaviour and representation. As a teenager Clark became politically active, protesting against the Vietnam War and campaigning against foreign military bases in New Zealand.

Clark has worked actively in the New Zealand Labour Party for most of her life. In 1971 she assisted Labour candidates to the Auckland City Council, three of whom were elected. Following this, she stood for the Auckland City Council herself in 1974 and 1977. While generally polling well, she never won a seat, missing out by only 105 votes in the latter.

Clark was a junior lecturer in political studies at the University of Auckland from 1973 to 1975. In 1974 she sought the nomination for the Auckland Central electorate, but lost to Richard Prebble. She instead stood for Piako, a National safe seat. Clark studied abroad on a University Grants Committee post-graduate scholarship in 1976, and then lectured in political studies at Auckland again while undertaking her PhD (which she never completed) from 1977 until her election to Parliament in 1981. Her father supported the National Party in that election.

Clark served as a member of Labour's national executive committee from 1978 until September 1988, and again from April 1989. She chaired the University of Auckland Princes Street branch of the Labour Party during her studies, becoming active alongside future Labour politicians including Richard Prebble, David Caygill, Margaret Wilson and Richard Northey. Clark held the positions of president of the Labour Youth Council, executive member of the party's Auckland Regional Council, secretary of the Labour Women's Council and member of the Policy Council. In 1980 she stood as a candidate for the position of junior vice-president. However, on the second day of the party conference, she withdrew her candidacy, allowing union secretary Dan Duggan to be elected unopposed.

Clark represented the New Zealand Labour Party at the congresses of the Socialist International and of the Socialist International Women in 1976, 1978, 1983 and 1986, at an Asia-Pacific Socialist Organisation Conference held in Sydney in 1981, and at the Socialist International Party Leaders' Meeting in Sydney in 1991.

== Member of Parliament ==
New Zealand Parliament
Years	Term	Electorate	List	Party
1981–1984	40th	Mount Albert		Labour
1984–1987	41st	Mount Albert		Labour
1987–1990	42nd	Mount Albert		Labour
1990–1993	43rd	Mount Albert		Labour
1993–1996	44th	Mount Albert		Labour
1996–1999	45th	Owairaka	1	Labour
1999–2002	46th	Mount Albert	1	Labour
2002–2005	47th	Mount Albert	1	Labour
2005–2008	48th	Mount Albert	1	Labour
2008–2009	49th	Mount Albert	1	Labour

Clark did not contest the 1978 election, but in 1980 she put her name forward to replace long serving MP Warren Freer in the safe Labour seat of Mount Albert. She beat six other contenders including electorate chairman Keith Elliot, former MP Malcolm Douglas and future MP Jack Elder for the nomination.

Clark was duly elected to the New Zealand House of Representatives in the 1981 general election, as one of eight female members in the 40th Parliament. In winning the Mount Albert electorate in Auckland, she became the second woman elected to represent an Auckland electorate, and the seventeenth woman elected to the New Zealand Parliament. Her first parliamentary intervention, on taking her seat was on 12 April 1982 to give notice, she would move a motion condemning the US Navy's deployment of nuclear cruise missiles in the Pacific. Two weeks later in her maiden speech, with unusual emphasis on defence policy and the arms race, Clark again condemned the deployment of cruise, Pershing and SS20 missiles and the global ambitions of both superpowers' navies, but claimed the Soviet admirals did not plough New Zealand's waters and expressed particular concern about the expansion of the 1965 memo of ANZUS understanding for the resupply of weapons to New Zealand to include nuclear weapon resupply.

During her first term in the House (1981–1984), Clark became a member of the Statutes Revision Committee. In her second term (1984–1987), she chaired the Select committee on Foreign Affairs and the Select Committee on Disarmament and Arms Control, both of which combined with the Defence Select Committee in 1985 to form a single committee. In 1983 she was appointed as Labour's spokesperson for Overseas Aid and Disarmament.

=== Cabinet minister ===
In 1987, Clark became a Cabinet minister in the Fourth Labour Government, led by David Lange (1984–1989), Geoffrey Palmer (1989–1990) and Mike Moore (1990). She served as Minister of Conservation from August 1987 until January 1989 and as Minister of Housing from August 1987 until August 1989. She became minister of health in January 1989 and took on additional portfolios as minister of labour and deputy prime minister in August 1989. As health minister, Clark introduced a series of legislative changes that allowed midwives to practice autonomously. She also introduced the Smoke-free Environments Act 1990, a law which restricted smoking in places such as workplaces and schools.

As deputy prime minister, Clark chaired the Cabinet Social Equity Committee and was a member of several other important Cabinet committees, such as the Policy Committee, Economic Development and Employment Committee, and Domestic and External Security Committee.

=== Leader of the Opposition ===
From October 1990 until December 1993 Clark held the posts of Deputy Leader of the Opposition, Shadow spokesperson for Health and Labour, and member of the Social Services Select Committee and of the Labour Select Committee. After the National Party won the 1993 general election with a majority of one seat, Clark successfully challenged Mike Moore for the leadership of the parliamentary party. She was particularly critical of Moore for delivering blurred messages during the 1993 election campaign, and accused him of failing to re-brand Labour as a centre-left party which had jettisoned Rogernomics.

Clark became the Leader of the Opposition on 1 December 1993. She led the Labour Party in opposition to the National-led government of Jim Bolger (1990–1997) and Jenny Shipley (1997–1999). Clark announced her first shadow cabinet on 13 December 1993, but the ousted Moore refused any portfolios. There were frequent changes after several party defections took place during the parliamentary term in the lead up to the new MMP voting system. At one reshuffle, in June 1995, Clark herself took the shadow foreign affairs portfolio.

The Labour Party rated poorly in opinion polls in the run-up to the 1996 general election, and Clark suffered from a low personal approval rating. At one point polls suggested that New Zealand First of Winston Peters would even poll 30% and Labour would be beaten into third place. However, she survived an attempted leadership coup by senior members who favoured Phil Goff. Labour lost the election in October 1996, but Clark remained as Opposition leader. Clark was seen as having convincingly won the election debates which led to Labour doing better than predicted. Shortly before the election she also achieved a rapprochement with Moore (who was previously thinking of setting up his own party) who accepted the foreign affairs and overseas trade portfolios, calming internal tensions.

During the 1998 Waitangi Day celebrations, Clark was prevented from speaking on the marae by activist Titewhai Harawira in protest over Clark's being allowed to speak in direct contradiction of traditional Māori protocol. The ensuing argument saw Clark being reduced to tears on national television.

In 1999, Clark was involved in a defamation case in the High Court of New Zealand with Auckland orthopaedic surgeon Joe Brownlee, resulting in Clark's making an unreserved apology. The case centred on a press statement issued by Clark criticising Brownlee, triggered by a constituent's complaint over the outcome of a hip replacement. Clark admitted the criticism was unjustified in that the complication suffered by her constituent was rare, unforeseen and unavoidable.

== Prime Minister (1999–2008) ==
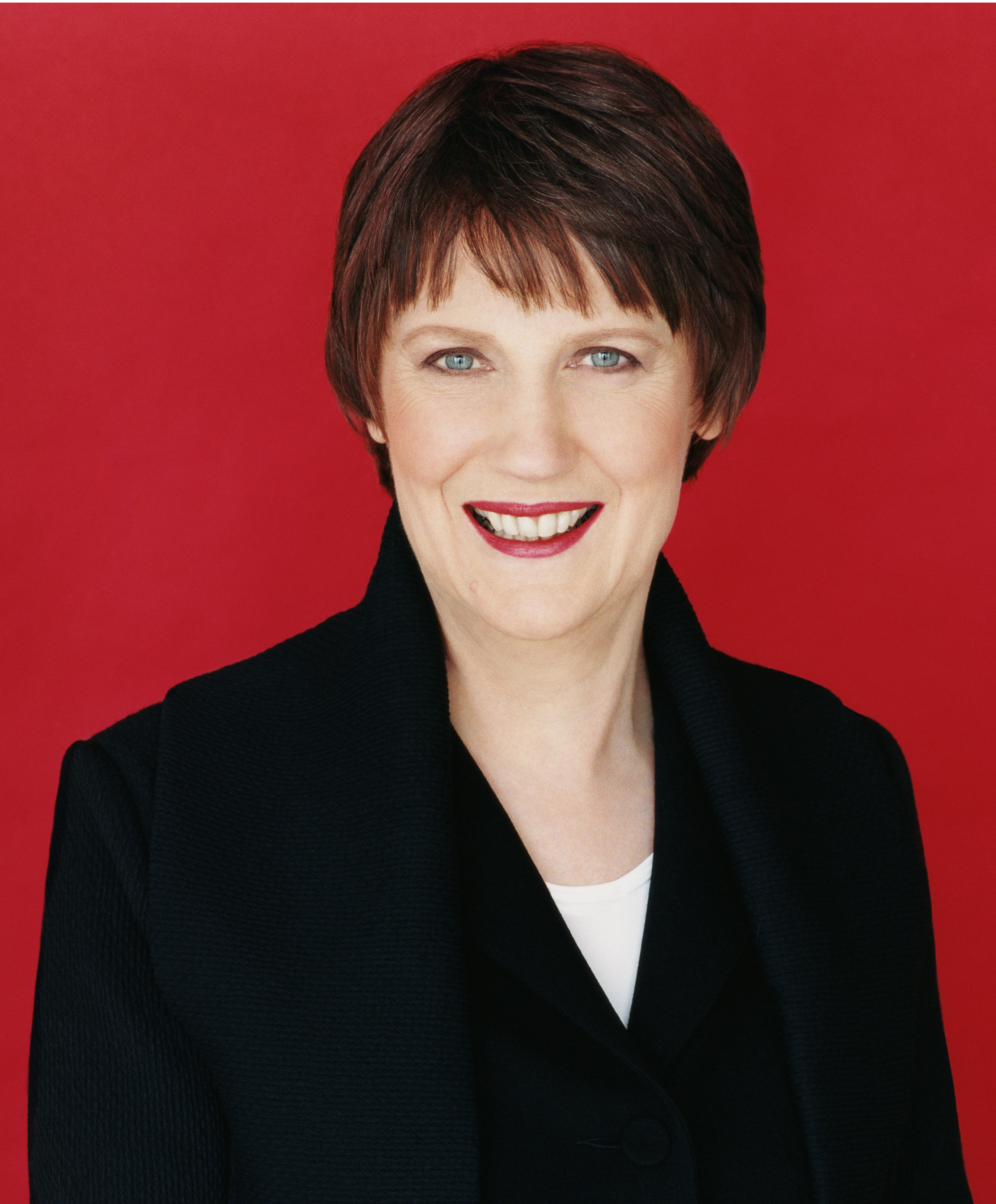
- Premiership of Helen Clark; 10 December 1999 – 19 November 2008
- Monarch: Elizabeth II
- Cabinet: Fifth Labour Government of New Zealand
- Party: New Zealand Labour Party
- Election: 1999, 2002, 2005
- Appointed by: Michael Hardie Boys
- Seat: Premier House

Under Clark's leadership, Labour became the largest party in parliament from 1999 to 2008. Clark became the second woman to serve as Prime Minister of New Zealand, and the first to have won office at an election. She also served as the Minister for Arts, Culture and Heritage throughout her premiership. She had additional ministerial responsibility for the New Zealand Security Intelligence Service (NZSIS) and for Ministerial Services. During her period in office, women held a number of prominent elected and appointed offices in New Zealand, such as the Governor-General, Speaker of the House of Representatives and Chief Justice—these major offices of state were simultaneously occupied by women between March 2005 and August 2006. As a female head of government, Clark was a member of the Council of Women World Leaders.

Clark entered office just three years after the adoption of the mixed member proportional (MMP) voting system, which had produced an unstable National-led government under Bolger and Shipley. Clark negotiated the formation of successive coalition governments. Political scientist Bryce Edwards identified Clark's ability to lead stable governments as her most significant achievement, arguing that her ability to work with a variety of coalition partners—including the Alliance, Jim Anderton's Progressive Party, Green, United Future and New Zealand First—consolidated public support for MMP.

Clark's particular interests included social policy and international affairs. A strong supporter of nuclear disarmament, Clark pursued a policy of peace-making within the Pacific region. She set herself the task of making New Zealand the first ecologically sustainable nation, describing this as "central to New Zealand's unique national identity". Her government's major policy achievements include the Working for Families package, increasing the minimum wage 5% a year, interest-free student loans, creation of District Health Boards, the introduction of a number of tax credits, overhauling the secondary school qualifications by introducing NCEA, and the introduction of fourteen weeks’ parental leave. Commentators praised Clark (along with Michael Cullen, the Minister of Finance) for overseeing a period of sustained and stable economic growth, with an increase in employment that saw a gradual lowering of the unemployment rate to a record low of 3.6% (in 2005).

Clark made every attempt to make sure that gender was not an issue in politics. However, Bryce Edwards states that others did. Clark was portrayed as bloodsucking, cold, and humourless. Clark says herself that when her male counterparts spoke in the media, they looked strong and determined, whereas when she portrayed the same characteristics, the media made it to look like she was "tough" and "nagging."

In 2006 Clark was 20th in Forbes magazine's ranking of the world's 100 most powerful women. By the time she left office in 2008 this had fallen to 56th.

=== First term: 1999–2002 ===
The 1999 general election produced a historic moment for New Zealand; for the first time, two women, Clark and Shipley, campaigned against each other as leaders of the country's two major parties. Clark repeatedly stated her desire to "govern alone" rather than as part of a coalition. However, in the lead up to the election, Labour made overtures to the left-wing Alliance. Clark addressed the Alliance's annual conference in August 1998. On polling day Labour returned 49 seats, an increase of 12, ahead of National's 39 seats. The first Clark-led Cabinet linked Labour with the Alliance and supported by the Green Party. Alliance leader Jim Anderton served as Deputy Prime Minister under Clark until 2002. The full ministerial team, and portfolios, was announced on 9 December—12 days after the election—and the new government was sworn in the following day. The coalition partners pioneered "agree to disagree" procedures to manage policy differences. Such procedures lessened the chances of Cabinet becoming publicly divided and running the risk of losing the confidence of the House of Representatives.

In January 2000, the then Police Commissioner, Peter Doone, resigned after The Sunday Star-Times alleged he had prevented the breath testing of his partner Robyn, who had driven the car they occupied, by telling the officer "that won't be necessary". Both Doone and the officer involved denied this happened. Doone sued the Sunday Star-Times for defamation in 2005, but the paper revealed they had checked the story with Clark. She confirmed this, but denied that she had made attempts to get Doone to resign and defended being the source as "by definition I cannot leak". Clark also responded by saying that National supporters had funded Doone's defamation-suit. Opinion on the significance of this incident varied.

In 2000, Labour MP Chris Carter investigated the background of one of Clark's Cabinet colleagues, Māori Affairs Minister Dover Samuels, regarding allegations of historic statutory rape. Ex-convict John Yelash claimed that Carter had approached him to help with the investigation; a claim that Carter denied. Clark backed her MP, referring to Yelash as a "murderer" when he had in fact been convicted of manslaughter, a less serious offence. Yelash sued Clark for defamation, resulting in an out-of-court settlement.

In April 2001, Clark met with Chinese president Jiang Zemin during an official visit to Beijing. Jiang referred to the Prime Minister as an "old friend". He stated that China hoped to "establish bilateral long-term and stable overall cooperative relations [with New Zealand]". Clark strongly supported China's entry into the World Trade Organization.

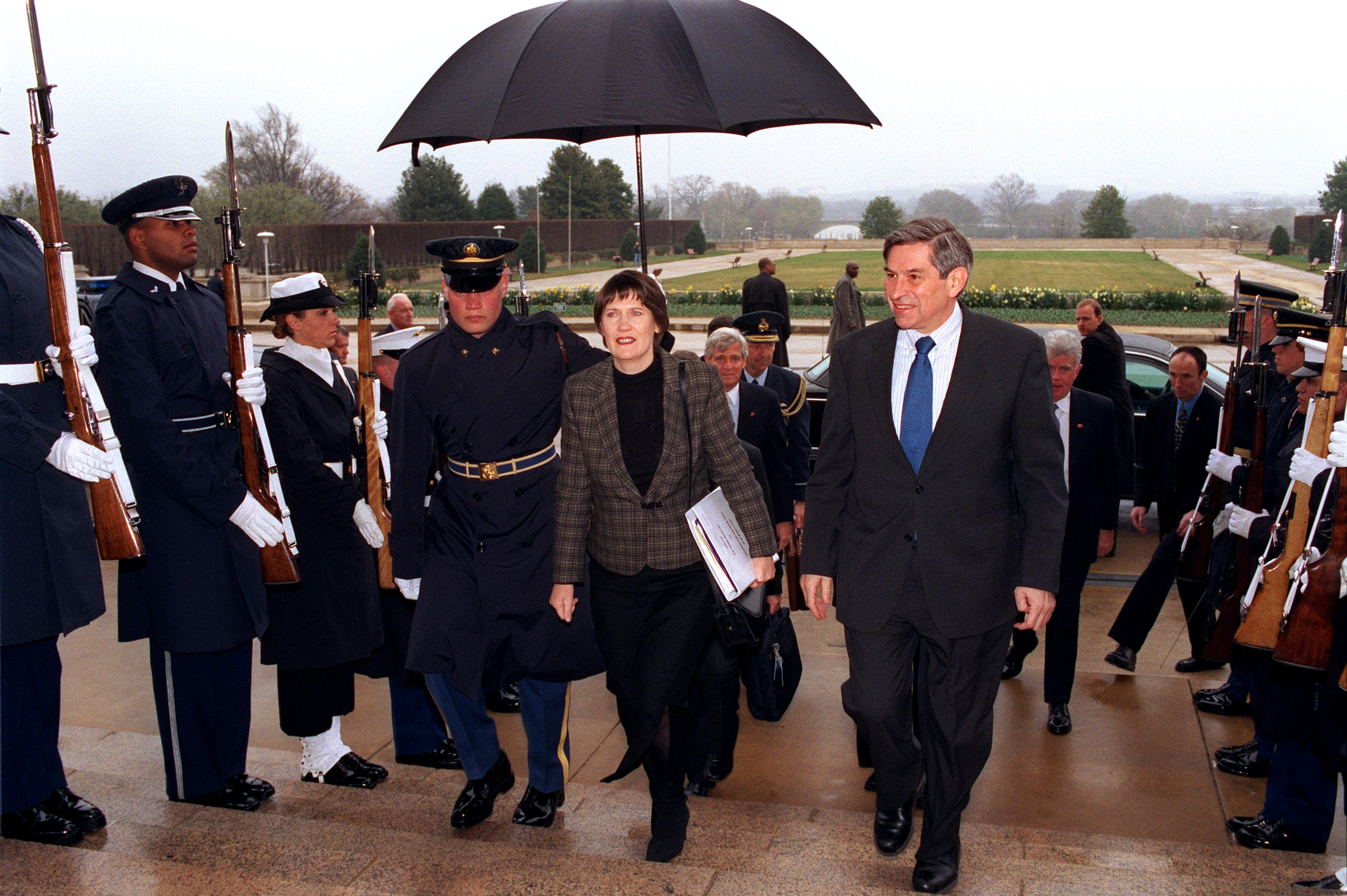
With Paul Wolfowitz at the Pentagon, 26 March 2002

In March 2002, Clark made her first visit to the United States as prime minister. She visited "Ground Zero", the former site of the World Trade Center, where the New York City Police Department presented her with a New Zealand flag that had been recovered from the rubble after the September 11 attacks. On 26 March, Clark visited the Pentagon and Washington, D.C., where she met with American officials, including a private meeting with President George W. Bush. Most of the agenda for Clark's visit focused on the joint counter-terrorism campaign (dubbed the "war on terror").

As Opposition Leader in 1998, Clark signed her name to a canvas that had been painted on by another artist. The painting was subsequently auctioned to charity. After the act came to light in April 2002, the opposition National Party referred the matter to the Police. A police report found evidence for a prima facie case of forgery, but determined that it was not in the public interest to prosecute Clark.

In June 2002, Clark apologised on behalf of New Zealand for aspects of the country's treatment of Samoa during the colonial era. Clark's apology was made in Apia during the 40th anniversary of Samoa's independence and televised live to New Zealand where Samoans applauded the Prime Minister's gesture.

The Alliance split in 2002 over the Government's commitment of New Zealand troops to the War in Afghanistan, leading to the imminent dissolution of Labour's coalition with that party. Consequently, Clark called for an early election to be held on 27 July. Political opponents claimed that Clark could have continued to govern, and that a snap election was called to take advantage of Labour's strong position in opinion polls. In opinion surveys conducted during the election campaign, Clark scored high approval ratings and was far ahead of other party leaders as "preferred Prime Minister".

A major issue during the 2002 election campaign was the end of a moratorium on genetic engineering, strongly opposed by the rival Green Party. The debate was reignited when investigative journalist Nicky Hager published a book, Seeds of Distrust, in which he alleged that Clark's government had covered up a contamination of genetically modified corn plants in 2000. A television interview with John Campbell was terminated by Clark when she was taken by surprise by the allegations, which she claimed to have known nothing about prior to the interview. The affair was dubbed "Corngate" by the media.

=== Second term: 2002–2005 ===
Clark won a second term in the 2002 general election—her party increased both its share of the vote and number of seats. Labour subsequently entered into a coalition with Jim Anderton's Progressive Party (a spin-off of the Alliance), with parliamentary confidence and supply coming from United Future, and a good-faith agreement with the Green Party. Michael Cullen, who served as minister of finance, was appointed deputy prime minister by Clark, replacing Anderton.

I think it's inevitable that New Zealand will become a republic and that would reflect the reality that New Zealand is a totally sovereign-independent 21st century nation 12,000 miles from the United Kingdom

— Prime Minister Helen Clark

A republican, Clark stated in 2002 that she thought it was "inevitable" that New Zealand would become a republic in the near future. Her term in office saw a number of alleged moves in this direction, under her government's policy of building national identity. Examples include the abolition of appeals to the Privy Council in London and the foundation of the Supreme Court of New Zealand; the abolition of titular knighthood and damehood honours (restored in 2009); and the abolition of the title "Queen's Counsel" (replaced by "Senior Counsel", restored in 2012).

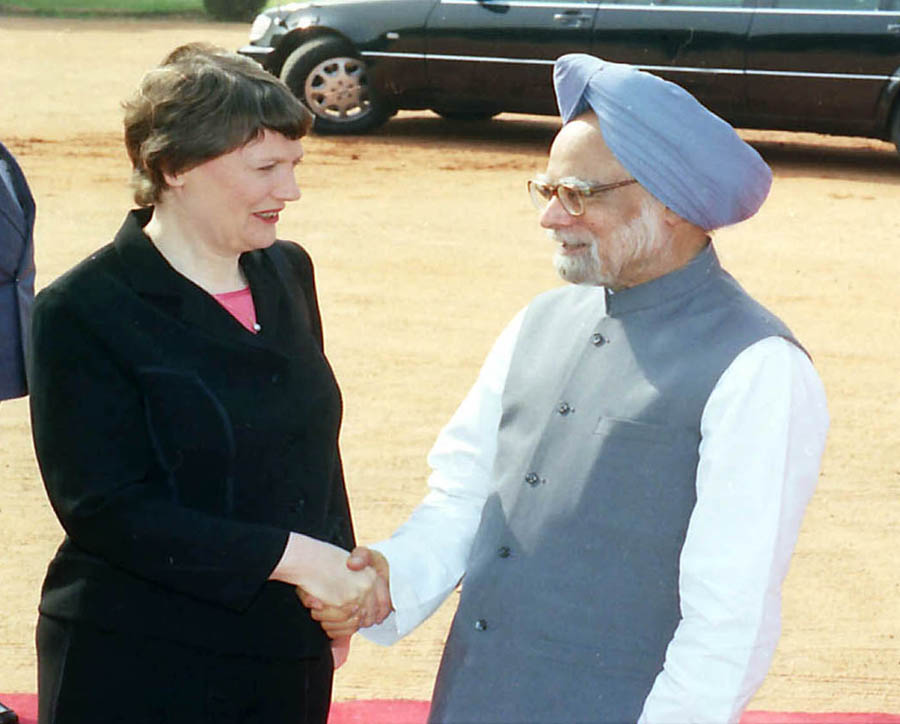
Clark with Indian Prime Minister Manmohan Singh, 20 October 2004

In 2003, Clark criticised the Invasion of Iraq without an explicit United Nations mandate, and her government opposed New Zealand military action in the Iraq War. Her government did not send combat troops to Iraq, although some medical and engineering units were sent. Clark's foreign policy reflected the priorities of liberal internationalism, especially the promotion of democracy and human rights; the strengthening of the role of the United Nations; the advancement of antimilitarism and disarmament; and the encouragement of free-trade. In March 2003, referring to the US-led coalition's actions in Iraq, Clark told the newspaper The Sunday Star-Times that, "I don't think that 11 September under a Gore presidency would have had this consequence for Iraq." She later sent a letter to Washington apologising for any offence that her comment may have caused.

On 17 July 2004, a motorcade involving police, Diplomatic Protection Squad, and Ministerial Services staff reached speeds of up to 172 km/h when taking Clark and Cabinet Minister Jim Sutton from Waimate to Christchurch Airport so she could attend a rugby union match in Wellington. The courts subsequently convicted the drivers involved for driving offences, but appeals resulted in the quashing of these convictions in December 2005 and August 2006. Clark said that she was busy working in the back seat and had no influence or role in the decision to speed and did not realise the speed of her vehicle.

In November 2004, Clark announced that negotiations with China had commenced for a free-trade agreement, eventually signing a comprehensive agreement in July 2008. It was New Zealand's largest trade deal since the 1983 Closer Economic Relations agreement with Australia.

=== Third term: 2005–2008 ===
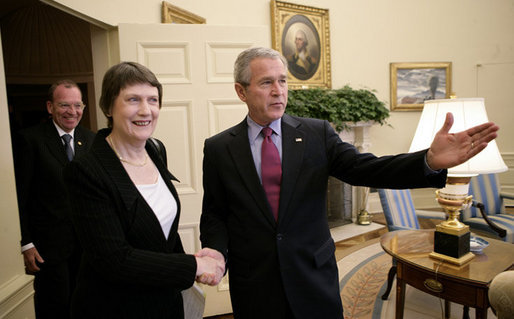
Clark meets US president George W. Bush at the White House, 22 March 2007.

In 2005, following that year's general election, Labour and the Progressive Party renewed their coalition, with confidence and supply arrangements with both New Zealand First and United Future in exchange for giving the leaders of those parties ministerial positions outside Cabinet. Greens were excluded from the resulting coalition, due to a refusal by United Future and NZ First to work with the Greens in cabinet. They were, however, able to negotiate a cooperation agreement which saw limited input into the budget and broad consultation on policy. Both co-leaders were appointed as government spokespeople outside cabinet, responsible for Energy Efficiency and for the Buy Kiwi Made campaign. Clark became the first Labour leader to win three consecutive elections. Clark won 66% of her electorate's votes, or 20,918 votes with a 14,749 majority.

On Armistice Day, 11 November 2006, Clark attended a service in Hyde Park, London, where a monument commemorating New Zealand's war dead was unveiled. During her visit she met Queen Elizabeth, Prince Charles and British prime minister Tony Blair.

On 26 May 2006, Clark ordered a military deployment to the 2006 East Timorese crisis alongside international partners.

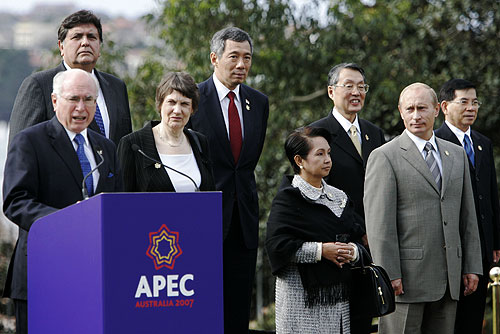
Clark in the Asia-Pacific Economic Cooperation Summit in Sydney, 9 September 2007

Clark's major overseas visit of her third term was a trip to the United States in March 2007, where she met with George W. Bush in Washington. Despite her strained relationship with the President, they agreed on many issues, including working cooperatively in foreign affairs, commerce and the need for both nations to work toward energy security.

On 8 February 2008, Clark was recognised as the longest-serving leader of the Labour Party in its history (although some uncertainty exists over the exact date when Harry Holland became party leader), having served for 14 years, 69 days. By 26 October 2008 she had passed Holland's longest possible term and her position as longest-serving Labour leader was put beyond doubt. (Note: No recent Prime Minister of New Zealand has lasted more than three terms in office, or their party as government. Keith Holyoake (1957; 1960–1972) was the last to do so, and William Massey (1912–1925) and Richard Seddon (1893–1906) both died one year into their fifth term.)

By the end of her tenure in office, Clark had come to be seen as a divisive figure, going from a Herald-DigiPoll popularity rating of nearly 60% in 2005 to 42% at the time of the 2008 general election. Portrayals of Clark as controlling and manipulative after the 2005 election increased when she abandoned her consensus-managerial approach, such as during the New Zealand foreshore and seabed controversy, and her support of the Crimes (Substituted Section 59) Amendment Act 2007 (the so-called anti-smacking law). She was accused of having a "nanny state" approach to social issues, a perception captured by the pejorative term 'Helengrad'.

Labour had been consistently behind the National Party in opinion polls since 2006, and the gap widened significantly in early 2007. On 5 August 2008 the Treasury announced that the New Zealand economy had entered a recession.

Clark's personal popularity was eclipsed by John Key soon after the latter's election as National Party Leader in November 2006. In the final media polls prior to the 2008 election Key was ahead of Clark in preferred prime minister polls by eight points in the Fairfax Media Nielsen poll and four points in the One News Colmar Brunton poll. In the 2008 election campaign, Clark attacked the National Party as "insincere" in its promise to maintain many of her government's flagship projects, such as KiwiSaver and Kiwibank.

National overtook Labour as the largest party following the 2008 election. Labour did not have the numbers to ally with smaller parties and no viable path to government; Clark conceded defeat to Key and announced that she was standing down as party leader. On 11 November 2008 Clark was succeeded by Phil Goff as Leader of the Labour Party. In the first Labour Party conference after its defeat Phil Goff acknowledged that Clark's government had become identified with "nanny-state" policies in the public mind, and said that the party wanted to "draw a line under the past and say, yes, we made mistakes, we didn't listen."

== Reputation and legacy ==
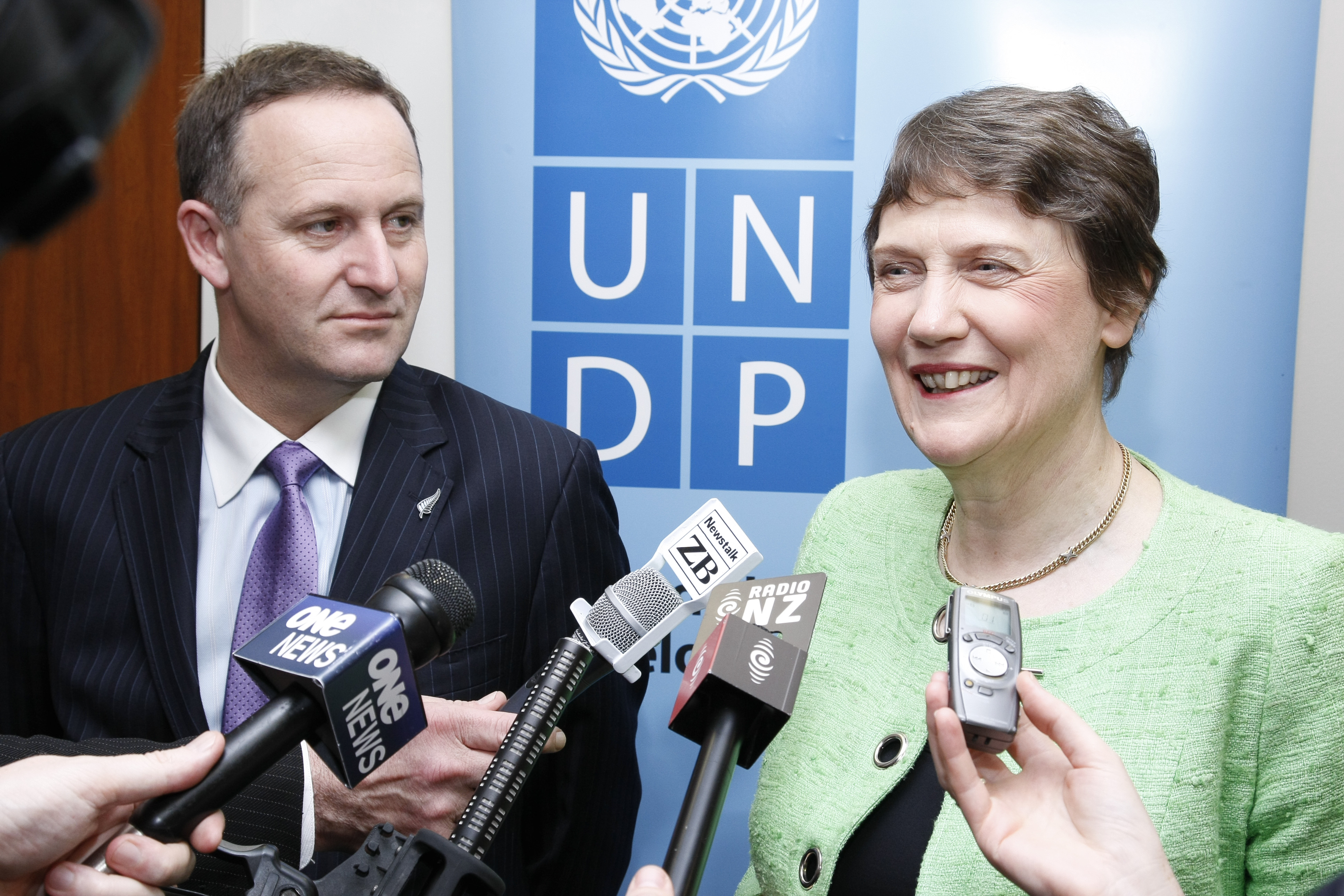
With her successor as Prime Minister, John Key, 22 September 2009

Early in her career, Clark gained a reputation as a capable advocate of nuclear disarmament and public health policy. As party leader, Clark denounced Rogernomics as "a ghastly period" and won the 1999 election by abandoning its legacy. However, biographer Denis Welch has argued that she did not do enough to repudiate the paradigm created by Rogernomics, instead allowing Labour and National to become "increasingly hard to tell apart" on many issues.

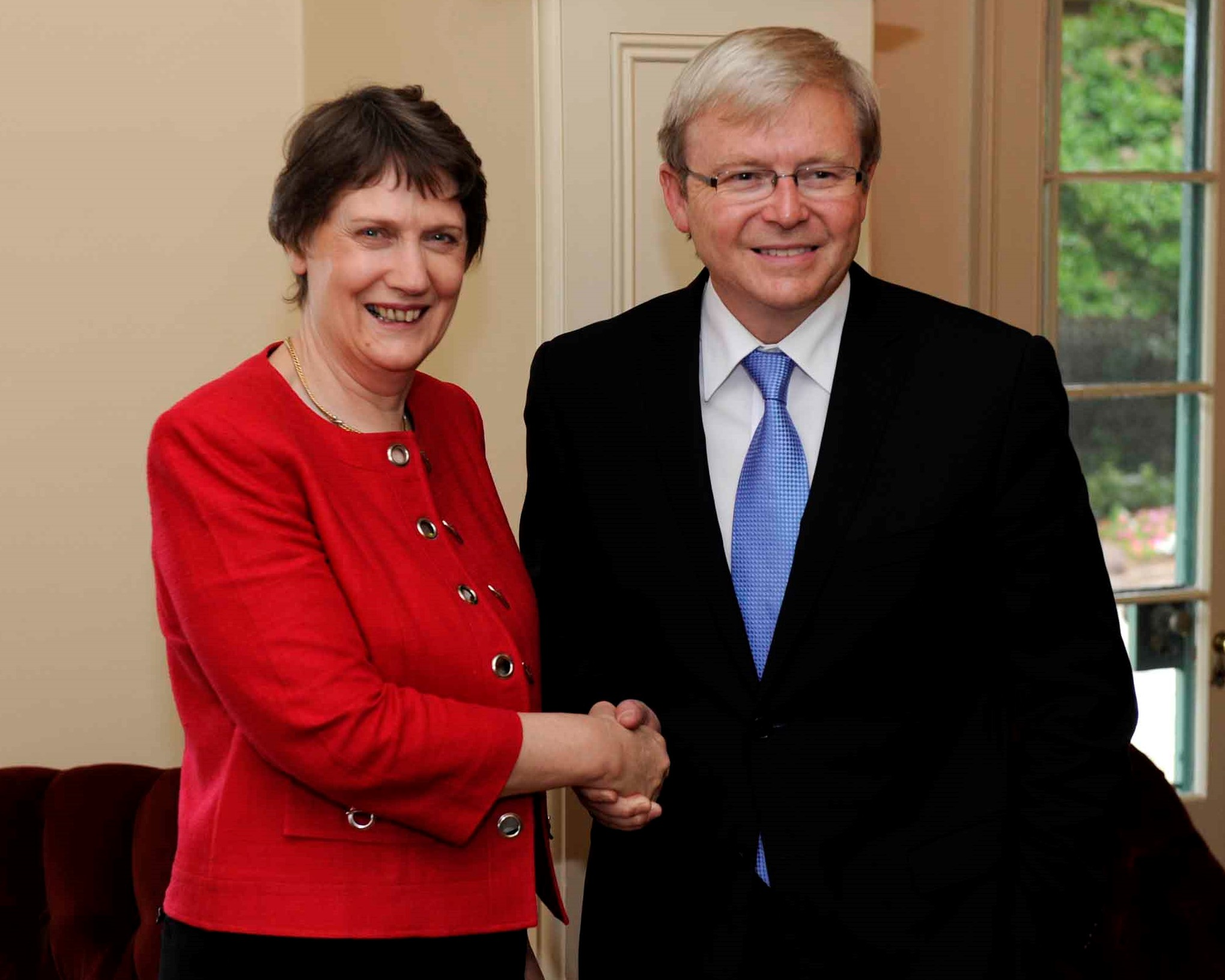
Clark with Australian Prime Minister (and Labor Party leader) Kevin Rudd, 12 February 2010

Clark's government was pragmatic, managerial, concerned with stability, and focused on incremental changes over grand projects. Political scientist Bryce Edwards argues that Clark was never a "conviction politician" and set out to be a "successful" rather than "great" politician, leaving behind a legacy of incremental reforms of New Zealand and good management of the status quo, but no bold ambitions. Likewise, commentator John Armstrong, while praising Clark, describes her as a "technocratic" prime minister "who will be remembered more for her management abilities than a capacity to inspire".

In January 2009, two months after losing office, Clark was voted 'Greatest Living New Zealander' in an opt-in website poll run by The New Zealand Herald. In a close race she received 25 per cent of the vote, ahead of Victoria Cross recipient Willie Apiata at 21 per cent. Then Prime Minister John Key said he was not surprised by the poll, saying "she is well thought of as a New Zealand Prime Minister."

Forbes magazine ranked Clark the 22nd most powerful woman in the world in 2016, down from 20th in 2006.

== Post-prime ministerial career ==
Clark was the first defeated Labour prime minister to immediately resign the party leadership rather than lead it in Opposition. She served as the shadow foreign affairs spokesperson in the Shadow Cabinet of Phil Goff for several months before retiring from Parliament in April 2009 to accept a position with the United Nations (UN).

=== United Nations Development Programme ===
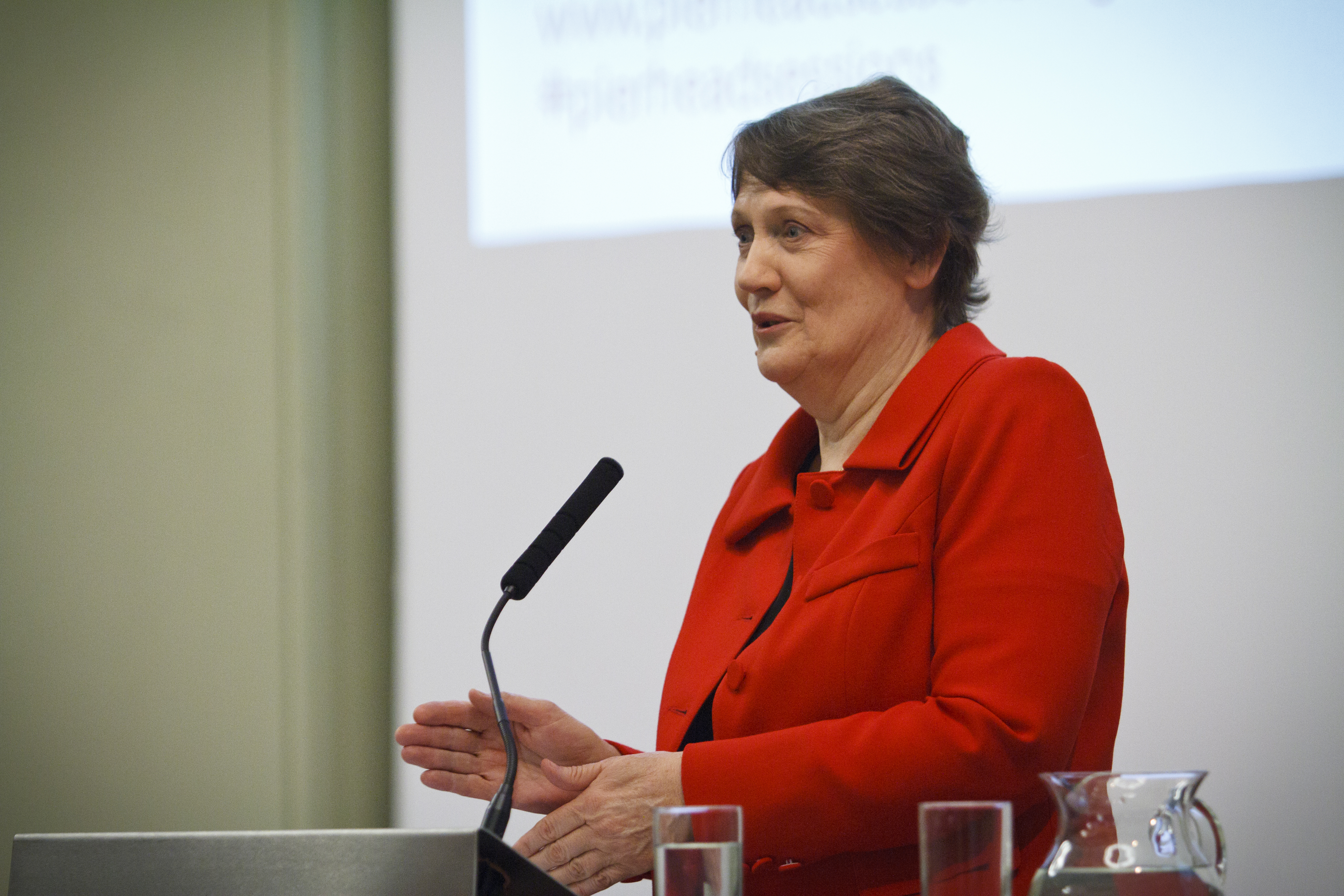
Clark at the Welsh Assembly, 17 April 2012

Clark became the Administrator of the United Nations Development Programme (UNDP) on 17 April 2009, and was the first woman to lead the organisation. She was also the Chair of the United Nations Development Group, a committee consisting of the heads of all UN funds, programmes and departments working on development issues. The New Zealand Government strongly supported her nomination, along with Australia, the Pacific Island nations and Prime Minister of the United Kingdom, Gordon Brown. She also received the support of the five countries on the bureau of the UNDP board (Iran, Haiti, Serbia, The Netherlands and Tanzania) and was unanimously confirmed by the General Assembly on 31 March. She was sworn in by UN Secretary-General Ban Ki-moon on 27 April 2009. In this position, Forbes deemed her the 23rd most powerful woman in the world.

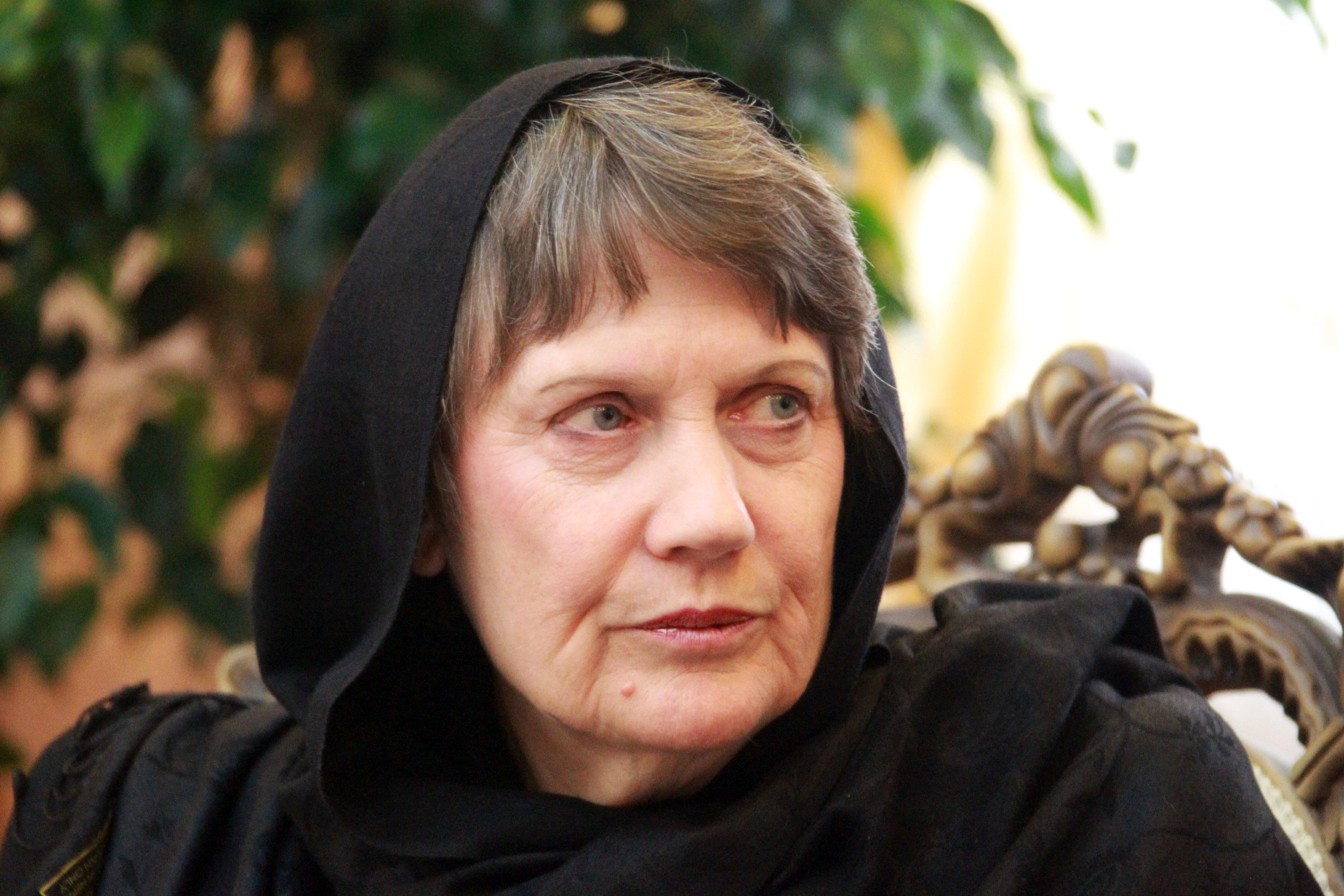
Clark wearing hijab in Tehran during a meeting with Iranian president Hassan Rouhani, 4 August 2013

In 2013, Forbes upgraded her position to 21st most powerful woman in the world after she was appointed to administer UNDP for a second term and for her potential future as UN Secretary General. She was the only New Zealander to make the list.

Clark was recognised for her managerial style of leadership. During her tenure, she was an advocate of China's Belt and Road Initiative. She worked to reform the administration and bureaucracy of UNDP, with an emphasis on greater transparency in the organisation. The Publish What You Fund campaign ranked UNDP as the most transparent aid organisation in the world in 2015 and 2016, under Clark's administration.

In February 2015, Clark visited Guinea, Liberia and Sierra Leone to express solidarity with those working to prevent the spread of Ebola.

During her tenure, the ratio of women to men at UNDP reached 50%, including at the most senior level of the organisation.

On 24 May 2016, a Foreign Policy article alleged that Clark's tenure as Administrator had "left a trail of embittered peers and subordinates", and accused her of "undercutting the UN's promotion of human rights". The article centred on an allegation that her senior staff retaliated against a critical report of the UNDP by forcing out an official who had participated in the investigation. Both the UNDP and Clark have denied the claims.

On 26 January 2017, Clark announced that she would not seek re-election as UNDP Administrator after the completion of her four-year term. She said it had been an "honour and privilege" to have served in the role. She left UNDP on 19 April 2017.

=== United Nations Secretary-General selection ===
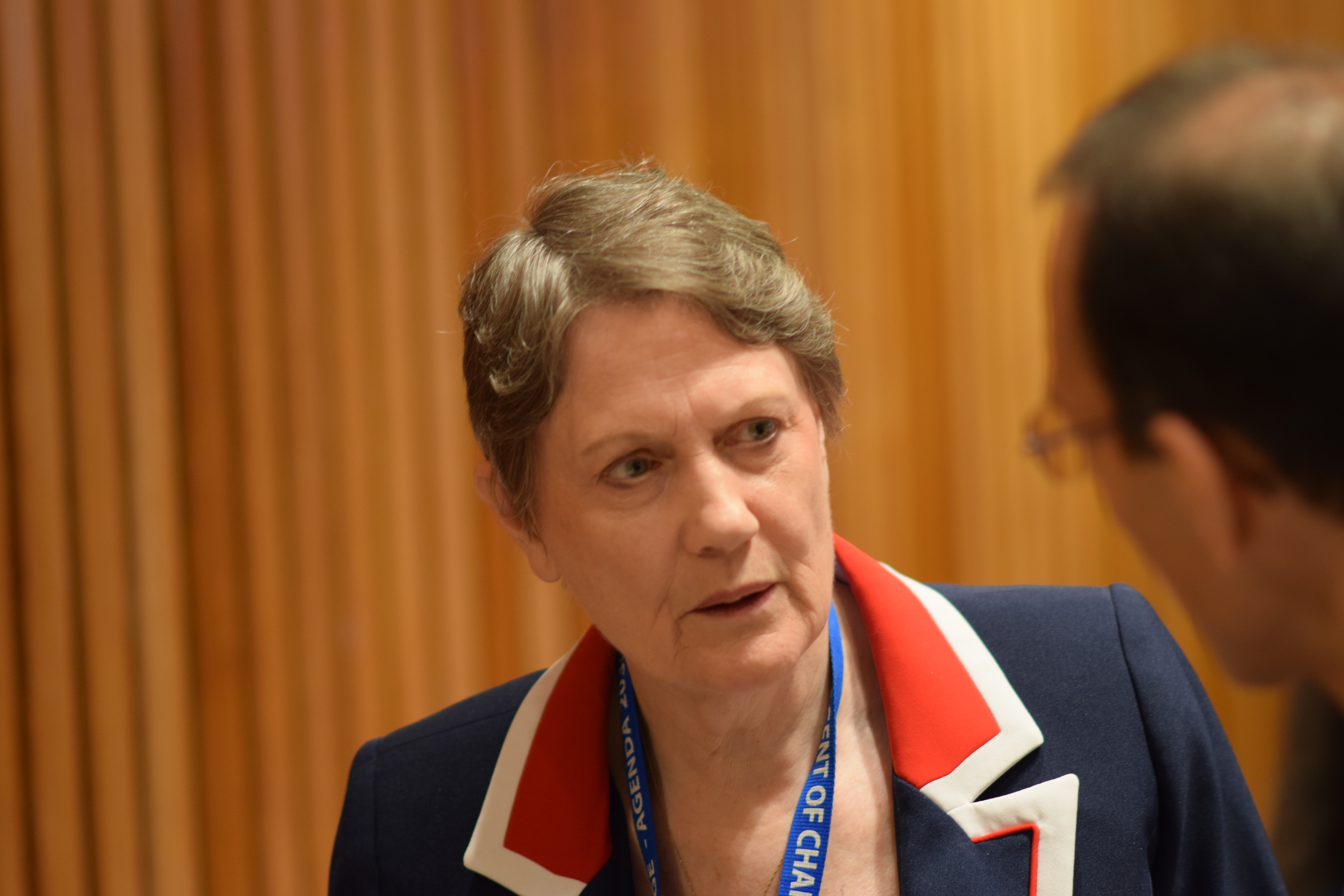
Clark at the United Nations General Assembly, July 2016

In January 2014, a Guardian interview with Clark raised the possibility that she could take over as UN Secretary-General after Ban Ki-moon's retirement in 2016. She did not confirm her interest, but commented: "There will be interest in whether the UN will have a first woman because they're looking like the last bastions, as it were." She also said in the same interview that: "If there's enough support for the style of leadership that I have, it will be interesting." In response, Prime Minister John Key said the New Zealand Government would support a bid, but cautioned that it would be a tough task to get the job.

On 4 April 2016, Helen Clark officially submitted her nomination as New Zealand's candidate for the 2016 UN Secretary-General selection. In an interview on the same day, Clark stressed that she was running as the gender-neutral best candidate and not "on the basis of being a woman."

The UN's role in the Haiti cholera outbreak has been widely discussed and criticised. There has been indisputable evidence that the UN is the proximate cause for bringing cholera to Haiti. Peacekeepers sent to Haiti from Nepal were carrying asymptomatic cholera and they did not treat their waste properly before dumping it into Haiti's water stream. When asked about compensation for victims, Clark has declined to take a position, calling it "legal issues."

Another issue that received attention during Clark's candidacy was allegations of sexual exploitation and abuse by UN peacekeepers. This gross problem was brought to light after Anders Kompass exposed the sexual assault of children by peacekeepers in the Central African Republic. During the United Nations Secretary General Candidate informal dialogues, Clark said that the UN needed to deal quickly with sexual exploitation and abuse, and gender-based violence by peacekeepers.

Straw polls were taken by secret ballot in October 2016. Clark finished fifth place in the sixth poll; her candidacy was effectively vetoed when three of the permanent Security Council members voted against her.

Clark's bid for Secretary-General is the topic of a documentary film, My Year With Helen, directed by Gaylene Preston, which premiered in February 2018.

=== World Health Organization ===
On 9 July 2020 the World Health Organization (WHO) appointed Clark as co-chair of a panel reviewing the WHO's handling of the COVID-19 pandemic and the response of governments to the outbreak. The Independent Panel for Pandemic Preparedness and Response (IPPR) examined how the outbreak occurred and how future pandemics can be prevented. She served in the role alongside former Liberian president Ellen Johnson Sirleaf, and of her appointment Clark said she hesitated before accepting because she felt the panel's task was "mission impossible". Clark's appointment to this panel drew criticism from UN Watch's Executive Director Hillel Neuer, who criticised her close ties with the pro-Beijing UN Goodwill Ambassador James Chau and her previous endorsement of Cuba for sending medical personnel abroad. On 11 November, Neuer called on Clark to resign, claiming that her alleged favouritism towards China and the WHO, would affect the investigation into China's handling of the COVID-19 pandemic. Clark responded that she had no ties with China.

On 19 January, the independent panel concluded that Chinese officials could have moved faster in January 2020 to curb the initial COVID-19 outbreak, and criticised the WHO for not declaring an international emergency until 30 January 2020. In the final report published in May 2021, the panel concluded that the pandemic could have been prevented if countries had taken a more proactive approach in February 2020; Clark said "so many countries chose to wait and see".

=== 2025 China Victory Day Parade ===
Clark along with fellow former prime minister John Key attended the 2025 China Victory Day Parade held in Beijing's Forbidden City on 3 September 2025 to mark the 80th anniversary of Japan's surrender at the end of World War II. The two former heads of governments also met with General Secretary of the Chinese Communist Party and Chinese president Xi Jinping. Clark and Key were among 70 special international guests invited by Xi to attend the military parade. Clark later told Stuff that she avoided speaking with Russian president Vladimir Putin, North Korean Supreme Leader Kim Jong Un and Belarusian president Alexander Lukashenko, who also attended the military parade. Chinese Ambassador Wang Xiaolong praised the two prime ministers for attending the commemorative events, stating that China and New Zealand had fought side by side during World War II.

== Personal life ==
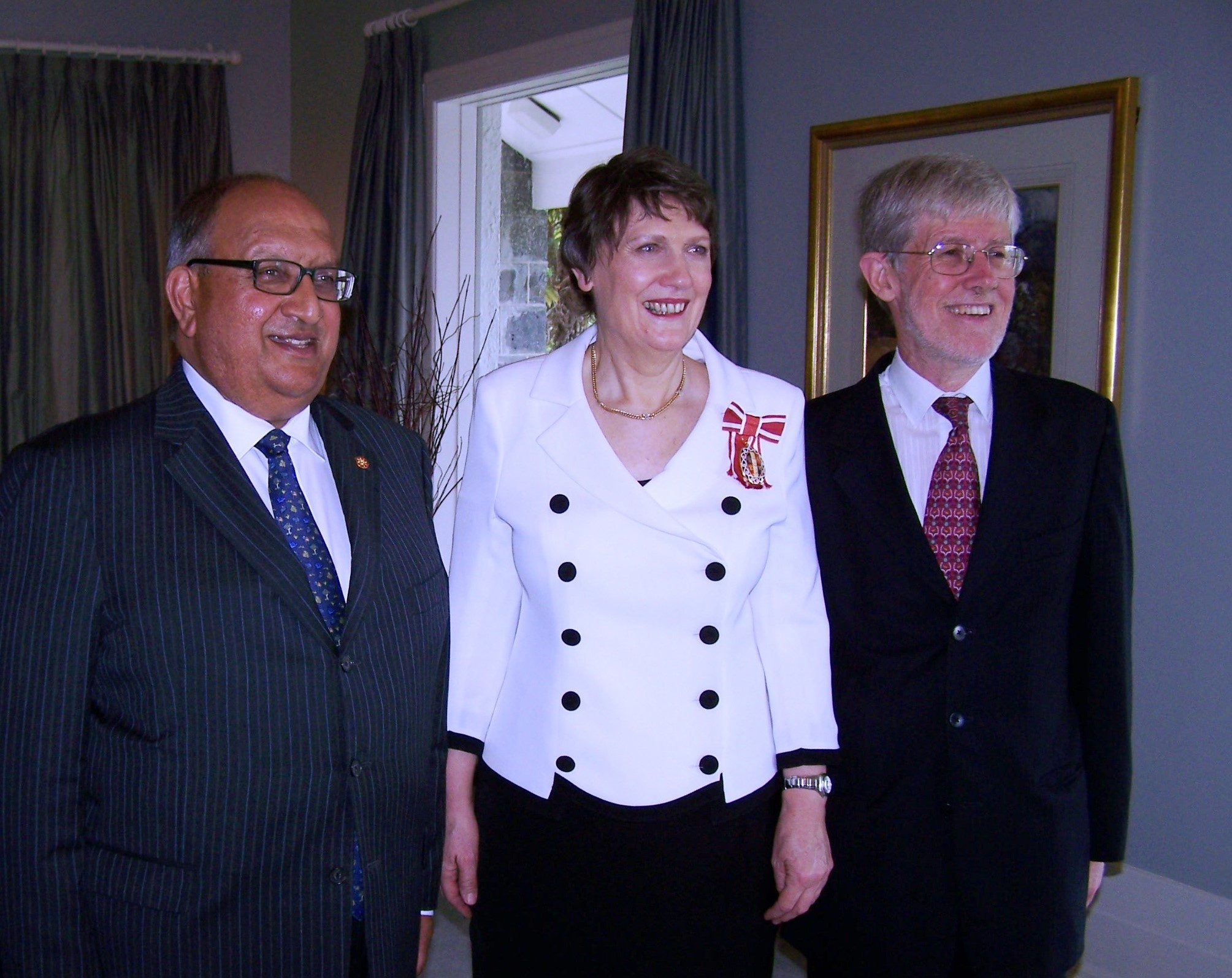
Then Governor-General Sir Anand Satyanand (left) pictured with Clark and her husband, Peter Davis, on the occasion of Clark's investiture as a Member of the Order of New Zealand, 17 February 2010

Clark was brought up as a Presbyterian, attending Sunday school weekly. When she was prime minister she described herself as an agnostic.

She married sociologist Peter Davis in 1981, shortly before she was elected to Parliament. Davis had been Clark’s partner for 5 years but she had come under pressure from some Labour members to marry for political purposes, despite her personal reservations about marriage. Davis is currently a professor in medical sociology and was director of COMPASS (Centre of Methods and Policy Application in the Social Sciences) at the University of Auckland.

After the 1981 elections Clark said: "It was a difficult campaign". In an essay for the book Head and Shoulders in 1984 she said: "As a single woman I was really hammered. I was accused of being a lesbian, of living in a commune, having friends who were Trotskyites and gays...".

In March 2001, Clark referred to National MP Wyatt Creech as a "scumbag" and a "sleazeball" for having raised the issue of a potential conflict of interest involving Davis, who was leading an academic research team studying government health reforms.

Clark is a keen hiker and mountaineer. In August 2008, an expedition group that included Clark and her husband became stranded on the Two Thumb Range, a spur of the Southern Alps, when their guide (and Clark's friend), Gottlieb Braun-Elwert, collapsed and died from a suspected heart attack.

== Views and positions ==
=== Social media ===
During her tenure as UNDP administrator and afterwards, Clark's presence on social media and avid use of Twitter has attracted positive attention in news media. She has called for greater regulation of social media platforms, and supports the Christchurch Call.

=== Cannabis reform ===
During the 2020 New Zealand cannabis referendum, Clark publicly supported the "Yes" vote campaign to decriminalise recreational cannabis, arguing that prohibition did not work. She also featured in the "We Do" campaign supporting the proposed "Cannabis Legalisation and Control Bill."

=== Israeli–Palestinian conflict and Iran ===
During the Gaza war, Clark criticised the decision by New Zealand and several other Western governments to halt their aid contributions to UNRWA (the United Nations Relief and Works Agency for Palestinian Refugees in the Near East) following allegations that several UNRWA workers had participated in the 2023 Hamas-led attack on Israel. She said it was "most regrettable that countries have acted in this precipitous way to defund the organisation on the basis of allegations". While Clark acknowledged that the allegations against UNRWA were serious, she said that "defunding the agency without knowing the outcome of the investigation was not the right decision."

In early March 2026, Clark described the US and Israeli airstrikes during the 2026 Iran war as a "clear breach" of the United Nations Charter, comparing it to the Iraq war and the Russian invasion of Ukraine. She criticised Prime Minister Christopher Luxon's unwillingness to condemn US and Israeli actions in Iran as inconsistent with New Zealand's traditional support for international law and the "international rules-based order."

=== AUKUS ===
In April 2024, Clark criticised the National-led coalition government's interest in associate membership of AUKUS, stating that New Zealand foreign policy towards its Western allies was lurching away from "hitherto bipartisan settings." She described this shift as "profoundly undemocratic". Clark also said "that New Zealand has worked on a bipartisan basis for decades to balance its economic interests, democratic values, and nuclear-free and independent foreign policy." She expressed concerns about the country getting drawn into geopolitical games.

In July 2024, Clark joined former National and ACT leader Don Brash in criticising the Government's perceived pro-US shift in New Zealand foreign policy. This came in response to Prime Minister Christopher Luxon's remarks that the Government would be more willing to disclose cases of Chinese espionage in New Zealand and participating in AUKUS Pillar 2.

=== Cook Islands ===
In mid-February 2025, Clark criticised Cook Islands Prime Minister Mark Brown for signing a strategic partnership agreement with China without consulting New Zealand. She said that Brown "seems to have signed behind the backs of his own people as well as of New Zealand."

=== Five Eyes ===
During an interview on TVNZ's Q+A current affairs programme, Clark questioned New Zealand's continued involvement in the Five Eyes intelligence network, saying that it had strayed from its original purpose of being merely a coordinating group for US, British, Canadian, Australian and NZ intelligence agencies into a basis for policy positioning on various issues including joint ministers and finance minister meetings. She said:

There's been some talk in the media that Trump might want to evict Canada from it… Please could we follow?

=== China ===
In June 2025 Clark co-signed a letter with fellow former Prime Minister Geoffrey Palmer to criticise the New Zealand government for actions against China. The letter cited a number of decisions as potentially souring New Zealand's relationship with China, including: authorising a naval vessel to sail through the Taiwan Strait "despite knowing that would antagonise China", strengthening military ties with the Philippines "at a time when it is in a low-level military stand-off with China in the South China Sea", sending delegations of MPs to Taiwan "knowing that the visit would cause offence".

=== United Nations ===
In October 2026 Clark voiced disagreement with New Zealand's abstention from a vote at the United Nations General Assembly on strengthening global pandemic preparedness and international cooperation. Foreign Minister Winston Peters had instructed the New Zealand delegation to abstain from the non-binding resolution, citing New Zealand First's "national interest test" in its coalition agreement with the Sixth National Government. New Zealand joined Paraguay in abstaining from the vote while the United States, Israel and Argentina opposed the resolution.

== Awards and honours ==
For almost nine years, Helen Clark shouldered both the powers and responsibilities of being Prime Minister confidently and adeptly. That only four other New Zealanders (Seddon, Massey, Holyoake, and Fraser) have held the Office for longer speaks much of Helen Clark's acumen, abilities and judgement.

— Governor-General Sir Anand Satyanand

- In 1986, Clark was awarded the annual Peace Prize of the Danish Peace Foundation for her work in promoting peace and nuclear disarmament.
- In 1990, Clark received the New Zealand 1990 Commemoration Medal.
- In 1993, Clark was awarded the New Zealand Suffrage Centennial Medal.
- In 2002, she was presented with the Nuclear-Free Future Award, for "installing New Zealand at the forefront of the world political movement to rid the earth of nuclear weapons".
- In 2005, the government of the Solomon Islands awarded Clark (with John Howard) the Star of the Solomon Islands in recognition of New Zealand's role in restoring law and order in the Solomon Islands. This award allows her to use the post-nominal letters "SSI".
- In January 2008, Clark won the United Nations Environment Programme Champions of the Earth award in recognition of the government's promotion of sustainability initiatives.
- In April 2009, she was awarded an honorary Doctor of Laws degree by the University of Auckland, her alma mater.
- In the 2010 New Year Honours, Clark was appointed a Member of the Order of New Zealand, New Zealand's highest honour, for services to New Zealand.
- She was recognised as one of the BBC's 100 women of 2013.
- In September 2017, she received a Lifetime Achievement Award at the New Zealand Women of Influence Awards
- In December 2017, she was awarded the Grand Cordon of the Order of the Rising Sun.
- In 2018, she was awarded an honorary Doctor of Laws from Carleton University.
- In June 2024, she was awarded an honorary Doctor of Laws degree by the University of St Andrews, exactly half a century since her graduation.

Patronage

- Clark is the patron for The Helen Clark Foundation.
- Clark is an Honorary Member of The International Raoul Wallenberg Foundation.
- She was the patron of the New Zealand Rugby League between 2002 and 2011, and has served as the patron of the Mount Albert Lions rugby league club for over 20 years.
- Clark is an International Honorary Member of Zonta International Zonta International

== In popular culture ==
In 1996, Clark guest starred as herself in the popular New Zealand soap opera Shortland Street. A satirical book, later adapted as a play, titled On the Conditions and Possibilities of Helen Clark Taking Me as Her Young Lover, by Richard Meros, was published by Lawrence and Gibson in 2005. Clark has also guest-starred on bro'Town, the New Zealand animated television series.

In 2020, the Eden Park Trust Board requested the right to stage six concerts a year, without having to seek individual planning permission – a process that had forced it to drop past concert plans. Clark said concerts at Eden Park stadium would "represent a home invasion of noise" and told a planning hearing the bid for six gigs a year should be rejected. Clark lives four streets from the stadium and told the independent planning commission "one's home is one's sanctuary". The former prime minister moved into her home in 1981 when Eden Park was a venue for daytime cricket and rugby.

== See also ==
- Electoral history of Helen Clark
- List of Nuclear-Free Future Award recipients
- Politics of New Zealand
- List of heads of government that have visited the South Pole

== Bibliography ==
- East, Roger; Thomas, Richard (2003). Profiles of People in Power: The World's Government Leaders. Psychology Press. ISBN 9781857431261. Archived from the original on 25 November 2017.
- Eyley, Claudia Pond; Salmon, Dan (2015). Helen Clark: Inside Stories. Auckland: Auckland University Press. ISBN 978-1-77558-820-7. Archived from the original on 15 February 2017.

New Zealand Parliament
Preceded by Warren Freer	Member of Parliament for Mount Albert; 1981–2009	Succeeded by David Shearer
Political offices
Preceded by David Caygill	Minister of Health; 1989–1990	Succeeded by Simon Upton
Preceded by Geoffrey Palmer	Deputy Prime Minister of New Zealand; 1989–1990	Succeeded by Don McKinnon
Preceded by Mike Moore	Leader of the Opposition; 1993–1999	Succeeded by Jenny Shipley
Preceded by Jenny Shipley	Prime Minister of New Zealand; 1999–2008	Succeeded by John Key
New office	Minister for Arts, Culture and Heritage; 1999–2008	Succeeded by Chris Finlayson
Preceded by Winston Peters	Minister of Foreign Affairs; Acting; 2008	Succeeded by Murray McCully
Party political offices
Preceded by Geoffrey Palmer	Deputy Leader of the Labour Party; 1989–1993	Succeeded by David Caygill
Preceded by Mike Moore	Leader of the Labour Party; 1993–2008	Succeeded by Phil Goff
Honorary titles
Preceded by Jonathan Hunt	Mother of the House; 2005–2009	Succeeded by Michael Cullen
Diplomatic posts
Preceded by Kemal Derviş	Administrator of the United Nations Development Programme; 2009–2017	Succeeded by Achim Steiner
