= Alice Tawhai =

New Zealand writer

Alice Tawhai is the pen name of a New Zealand fiction writer. She is of Tainui and Ngāpuhi tribes.

Tawhai's writing focuses on the experiences of ethnic minorities in New Zealand. She also highlights the voice of contemporary Māori culture. Her publication Festival of Miracles was shortlisted for the Montana Book Award for Best First Book and her collection of short stories, Luminous, was shortlisted for the Montana Book Award for Fiction in 2008.

In 2021, she released her debut novel Aljce in Therapy Land which was long-listed for the Jann Medlicott Acorn Prize for Fiction at the 2022 Ockham New Zealand Book Awards. The novel deals with themes of bullying at work, marijuana and draws multiple strands of plot and character development from Lewis Carroll's Alice in Wonderland. Writing for The Spinoff Rebecca K Reilly, said the book "takes risks, is experimental with pacing, uses a lot of expository dialogue and frequently slips between reality and fantasy." Writing for Landfall, Gina Cole described it as a "delightfully crazy and, at times, hilarious story and an engaging comment on the strangeness of life by a great storyteller."

== Publications ==
- Festival of Miracles (2005, Huia Publications)
- Luminous (2007, Huia Publications)
- Dark Jelly (2011, Huia Publications)
- Aljce in Therapy Land (2021, Lawrence and Gibson)
