= Electoral history of Helen Clark =

List of elections featuring Helen Clark as a candidate

This is a summary of the electoral history of Helen Clark, Prime Minister of New Zealand (1999–2008), Leader of the Labour Party (1993–2008) and Member of Parliament for Mount Albert (1981–2008).

== Local-body elections ==
=== 1974 election ===
1974 election: Auckland Regional Authority, Auckland city ward
Party	Candidate	Votes	%	±%
Citizens & Ratepayers	John Allsopp-Smith	17,644	55.78	+0.12
Citizens & Ratepayers	Tom Pearce	17,419	55.07	−5.94
Independent	Sir Dove-Myer Robinson	17,258	54.56	−6.53
Citizens & Ratepayers	Ian McKinnon	15,290	48.34	−5.91
Citizens & Ratepayers	Bill Barrett	14,583	46.10	−7.72
Labour	Helen Clark	12,050	38.10	
Citizens & Ratepayers	Bob Johnson	11,963	37.82	
Labour	Alex Dreaver	11,791	37.28	−11.15
Labour	Richard Northey	10,808	34.17	−1.78
Labour	BJ Kirkwood	10,063	31.81	
Values	Reg Clough	7,413	23.43	
Labour	Peter Neilson	7,392	23.37	
Values	Brian Jessup	4,458	14.09	
Turnout		31,627	34.44	+2.22
Registered electors		91,807		

=== 1977 election ===
1977 election: Auckland Regional Authority, Auckland city and Waiheke Island ward
Party	Candidate	Votes	%	±%
Citizens & Ratepayers	Lindo Ferguson	20,359	57.78	
Independent	Sir Dove-Myer Robinson	19,719	55.96	+1.40
Citizens & Ratepayers	Mel Tronson	19,415	55.10	
Labour	Jim Anderton	17,846	50.64	−1.41
Citizens & Ratepayers	Jolyon Firth	17,466	49.57	
Citizens & Ratepayers	Ian McKinnon	15,465	43.89	−4.45
Citizens & Ratepayers	Bill Barrett	14,655	41.59	−4.51
Labour	Helen Clark	13,345	37.87	−0.23
Labour	Richard Northey	10,832	30.74	−3.43
Labour	John Clarke	9,438	26.78	
Labour	H R Green	9,212	26.14	
Values	Jeanette Fitzsimons	6,966	19.77	
Socialist Unity	Les Bravery	1,452	4.12	
Turnout		35,234	34.10	−0.34
Registered electors		103,321		

== Parliamentary elections ==
=== 1975 election ===
1975 general election: Piako
Party	Candidate	Votes	%	±%
National	Jack Luxton	10,248	59.9	+4.5
Labour	Helen Clark	4,074	23.8	
Social Credit	Alex Mikkelson	2,322	13.6	−1.8
Values	Sally Ruth Child	460	2.7	
Majority		6,174	36.1	+6.7
Turnout		20,538	83.5	

=== 1981 election ===
1981 general election: Mount Albert
Party	Candidate	Votes	%	±%
Labour	Helen Clark	10,027	51.32	
National	Warren Moyes	6,120	31.32	
Social Credit	Harold Dance	3,391	17.35	+5.84
Majority		3,907	19.99	
Turnout		19,538	86.34	+2.00
Registered electors		22,627		

=== 1984 election ===
1984 general election: Mount Albert
Party	Candidate	Votes	%	±%
Labour	Helen Clark	12,231	56.74	+5.42
National	Rod Cavanagh	6,024	27.94	
NZ Party	Michelle Gonsalves	2,390	11.08	
Social Credit	Douglas McGee	908	4.21	
Majority		6,207	28.79	+8.80
Turnout		21,553	89.82	+3.48
Registered electors		23,995		

=== 1987 election ===
1987 general election: Mount Albert
Party	Candidate	Votes	%	±%
Labour	Helen Clark	11,326	62.25	+5.51
National	Rob Wheeler	5,989	32.91	
Democrats	Gillian Dance	861	4.73	
Independent	Malcolm Moses	17	0.09	
Majority		5,537	30.43	+1.64
Turnout		18,193	84.02	−5.80
Registered electors		21,653		

=== 1990 election ===
1990 general election: Mount Albert
Party	Candidate	Votes	%	±%
Labour	Helen Clark	7,914	43.48	−18.77
National	Larry Belshaw	6,684	36.72	
Green	Harry Parke	1,774	9.74	
NewLabour	Jennie Walker	1,418	7.79	
McGillicuddy Serious	Adrian Holroyd	151	0.82	
Social Credit	Richard Povall	133	0.73	
Democrats	Syd Leach	127	0.69	
Majority		1,230	6.75	−23.68
Turnout		18,201	82.19	−1.83
Registered electors		22,143		

=== 1993 election ===
1993 general election: Mount Albert
Party	Candidate	Votes	%	±%
Labour	Helen Clark	9,546	49.41	+5.93
National	Vanessa Brown	4,890	25.31	
Alliance	Doug McGee	2,873	14.87	
NZ First	Elizabeth Anderson	1,370	7.09	
Christian Heritage	Jens Meder	259	1.34	
McGillicuddy Serious	KT Julian	195	1.00	
Workers Rights	Ivan Sowry	97	0.50	
Natural Law	Stewart Sanson	62	0.32	
Defence Movement	Anthony Van Den Heuvel	25	0.12	
Majority		4,656	24.10	+17.35
Turnout		19,317	83.45	+1.26
Registered electors		23,146		

=== 1996 election ===
1996 general election: Owairaka
Party	Candidate	Votes	%	±%
Labour	Helen Clark	16,686	51.20	+1.79
National	Phil Raffills	10,706	32.85	
NZ First	Jason Keiller	2,297	7.05	
Alliance	Keith Locke	1,775	5.45	
ACT	Andrew Couper	768	2.36	
McGillicuddy Serious	Julia Johnson	217	0.67	
Natural Law	Martin Davy	90	0.28	
Advance New Zealand	Eric Chuah	50	0.15	
Majority		5,980	18.35	−5.75
Turnout		32,589		

=== 1999 election ===
1999 general election: Mount Albert
Party	Candidate	Votes	%	±%
Labour	Helen Clark	18,982	64.37	+13.17
National	Noelene Buckland	5,874	19.92	
Alliance	Jill Ovens	1,139	3.86	
ACT	Daniel King	1,062	3.60	
Green	Mike Johnson	1,032	3.50	
Christian Heritage	Diane Taylor	658	2.23	
NZ First	Seini Mafi	403	1.37	
McGillicuddy Serious	Kerry Hoole	193	0.65	
United NZ	Hassan Hosseini	124	0.42	
Republican	Jane Hotere	23	0.08	
Majority		13,108	44.45	+26.10
Turnout		29,490		

=== 2002 election ===
2002 general election: Mount Albert
Party	Candidate	Votes	%	±%
Labour	Helen Clark	19,514	68.49	+4.12
National	Raewyn Bhana	3,490	12.24	
ACT	Bruce Williams	1,550	5.44	
Green	Jon Carapiet	1,537	5.39	
United Future New Zealand	Hassan Hosseini	726	2.54	+2.1
Christian Heritage	Pauline Cooper	426	1.49	
Alliance	Jill Ovens	334	1.17	−2.7
Progressive	Gillian Dance	299	1.04	
Legalise Cannabis	Daphna Whitmore	116	0.40	
Independent	Rick Stevenson	52	0.18	
Majority		16,024	56.24	+11.79
Turnout		28,491		

=== 2005 election ===
2005 general election: Mount Albert
Party	Candidate	Votes	%	±%
Labour	Helen Clark	20,918	66.55	−1.94
National	Ravi Musuku	6,169	19.63	
Green	Jon Carapiet	1,485	4.72	
NZ First	Julian Batchelor	746	2.37	
ACT	David Seymour	746	2.37	
United Future New Zealand	Tony Gordon	529	1.68	
Progressive	Jenny Wilson	407	1.29	
Destiny	Anne Williamson	337	1.07	
Independent	Jim Bagnall	83	0.26	
Anti-Capitalist Alliance	Daphna Whitmore	79	0.25	−0.15
Independent	Anthony Ravlich	47	0.15	
Direct Democracy	Howard Ponga	30	0.10	
Independent	Erik Taylor	29	0.09	
Majority		14,749	46.40	−9.84
Turnout		31,747		

=== 2008 election ===
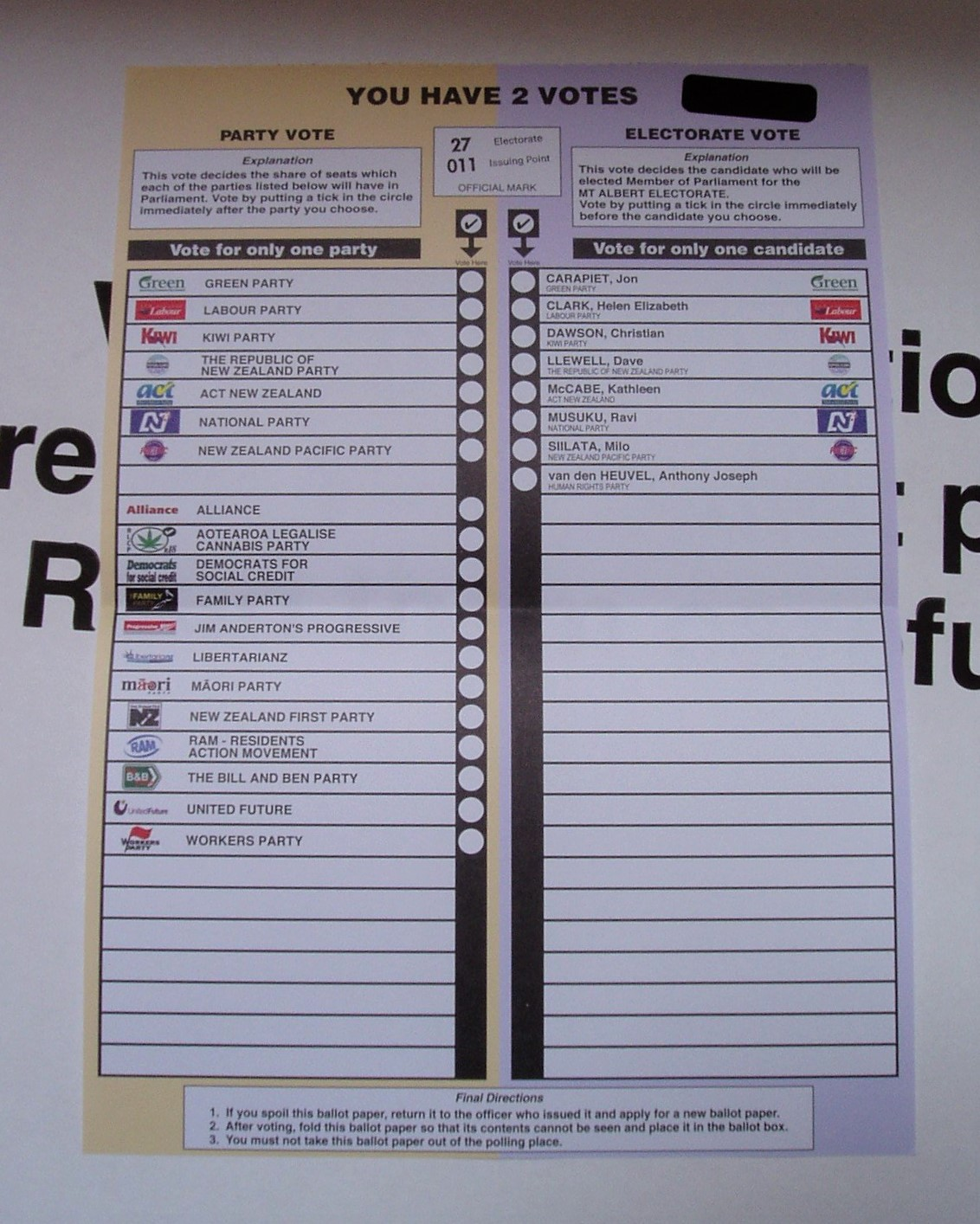
Helen Clark listed on a ballot paper for the 2008 election

2008 general election: Mount Albert
Party	Candidate	Votes	%	±%
Labour	Helen Clark	20,157	59.29	−7.26
National	Ravi Musuku	9,806	28.84	+9.21
Green	Jon Carapiet	2,019	5.94	+1.22
ACT	Kathleen McCabe	1,392	4.09	
Kiwi	Christian Dawson	249	0.73	
Pacific	Milo Siilata	234	0.69	
Independent	Anthony van den Heuvel	87	0.26	
RONZ	Dave Llewell	53	0.16	
Majority		10,351	29.30	−17.10
Turnout		33,997		

== Leadership elections ==
=== 1989 deputy-leadership election ===
Candidate	Votes	%
Helen Clark	29	53.71
Roger Douglas	25	46.29
Majority	4	7.40
Turnout	54	—N/a

=== 1993 leadership election ===
Candidate	Votes	%
Helen Clark	26	57.77
Mike Moore	19	42.23
Majority	7	15.55
Turnout	45	—N/a

== United Nations elections ==
=== United Nations Secretary-General selection, 2016 ===
United Nations Secretary-General selection straw poll results
Candidate	21 July			5 August			29 August			9 September			26 September			5 October			Final Vote
Candidate	E	D	N	E	D	N	E	D	N	E	D	N	E	D	N	E	D	N	Final Vote
(Bulgaria) Irina Bokova	9	4	2	7	7	1	7	5	3	7	5	3	6	7	2	7 (3P)	7 (2P)	1	Withdrawn
(New Zealand) Helen Clark	8	5	2	6	8	1	6	8	1	6	7	2	6	9	0	6 (1P)	8 (3P)	1 (1P)	Withdrawn
(Costa Rica) Christiana Figueres	5	5	5	5	8	2	2	12	1	5	10	0	Withdrawn						
(Bulgaria) Kristalina Georgieva	Not yet nominated															5 (2P)	8 (2P)	2 (1P)	Withdrawn
(Moldova) Natalia Gherman	4	4	7	3	10	2	2	12	1	3	11	1	3	11	1	3 (1P)	11 (3P)	1 (1P)	Withdrawn
(Portugal) António Guterres	12	0	3	11	2	2	11	3	1	12	2	1	12	2	1	13 (4P)	0	2 (1P)	Acclaimed
(Serbia) Vuk Jeremić	9	5	1	8	4	3	7	5	3	9	4	2	8	6	1	7 (2P)	6 (3P)	2	Withdrawn
(North Macedonia) Srgjan Kerim	9	5	1	6	7	2	6	7	2	8	7	0	6	9	0	5 (2P)	9 (3P)	1	Withdrawn
(Slovakia) Miroslav Lajčák	7	3	5	2	6	7	9	5	1	10	4	1	8	7	0	7 (2P)	6 (2P)	2 (1P)	Withdrawn
(Montenegro) Igor Lukšić	3	7	5	2	9	4	Withdrawn												
(Argentina) Susana Malcorra	7	4	4	8	6	1	7	7	1	7	7	1	7	7	1	5 (2P)	7 (1P)	3 (2P)	Withdrawn
(Croatia) Vesna Pusić	2	11	2	Withdrawn															
(Slovenia) Danilo Türk	11	2	2	7	5	3	5	6	4	7	6	2	7	7	1	5 (1P)	8 (4P)	2	Withdrawn

Candidate received at least one "encouraged" from a veto-wielding P5 member
Candidate received at least one "discouraged" from a veto-wielding P5 member
