= Brannavan Gnanalingam =

Sri Lankan-born New Zealand lawyer and writer

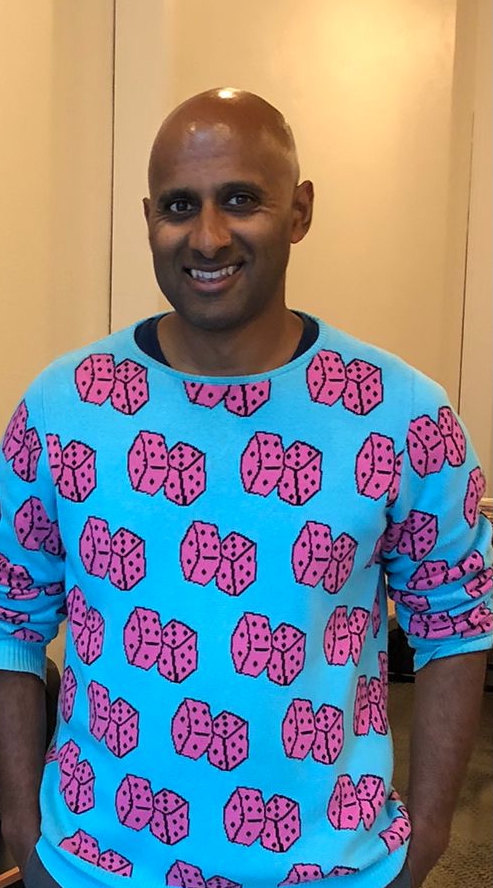
- Brannavan Gnanalingam at a book launch in 2024.
- Born: 20 October 1983 (age 43); Sri Lanka
- Citizenship: New Zealand
- Occupations: Author, Lawyer

Brannavan Gnanalingam (born 20 October 1983, Sri Lanka) is a New Zealand author and practicing lawyer with the New Zealand firm Buddle Findlay at its Wellington office.

== Biography ==
Gnanalingam was born in Sri Lanka and grew up in Lower Hutt. His debut novel Getting Under Sail was published by Lawrence and Gibson in 2011. The novel was based on a trip Gnanalingam undertook with two friends from Morocco to Ghana, which included being mistakenly detained for the French tourist killings in Mauritania. The book was praised for "the narrator’s wry honesty, miles away from the usual Africa travelogue clichés". In 2013 his second novel You Should Have Come Here When You Were Not Here was published and received positive reviews in New Zealand. The book follows a trip by a middle-aged woman to Paris, who instead of finding it the city of love, experiences it as a cold and disorienting place. The book was based on Gnanalingam's time spent in Paris between 2012 and 2013. His third novel, Credit in the Straight World (2015), his first set in New Zealand, is "a satirical account of the global financial crisis" described by the New Zealand Herald as a "tale of surreal humour and genuine insight". His fourth novel, A Briefcase, Two Pies and a Penthouse (2016), was longlisted for the 2017 Ockham New Zealand Book Awards novel of the year.

His fifth novel published in 2017, Sodden Downstream, was shortlisted for the 2018 Ockham New Zealand Book Awards novel of the year with The Spinoff books editor Steve Braunias noting that his inclusion was "a particularly good call." In a review of the book The Pantograph Punch said, "His rendition of Kiwi idiom is some of the best you’ll read." Gnanalingam confessed to The Dominion Post, talking about Sodden Downstream, "...[T]here are so few Sri Lankan characters in New Zealand literature. I wanted to reflect that....It's...based on the fact that the Sri Lankan Civil War was something that my family and I went through, so I can write from personal experience."

His 2020 novel, Sprigs, won the 2021 Best Novel prize at the Ngaio Marsh Awards and was shortlisted for the 2021 Fiction award at the Ockham New Zealand Book Awards. The Guardian described Sprigs as "an incendiary novel" and "an important examination of racism, violence and toxic masculinity that everyone should read".

In 2022, Gnanalingam novel, Slow Down, You're Here, was released. The book was described as a horror novel, received critical praise and was listed as one of the best books of the year by The Spinoff. This novel was followed by The Life and Opinions of Kartik Popat (2024), which is a fictional autobiography of a South Asian right-wing, political grifter. Writing at the time of publication, Gnanalingam citing an interview between Ann Coulter and Vivek Ramaswamy as the inspiration for the book:

Ramaswamy shows that you can grease up to racist folks by doing some of the heavy lifting for them, but they’ll still never view you as one of them. You’re just the hired help. And they’ll still view you as a loser.

From 2006–2016, Gnanalingam contributed to the online publication The Lumière Reader, which is now on hiatus. He covered film festivals such as Venice, Berlin, Rotterdam, and Cannes when writing for this publication. He has also written for The Spinoff, The New Zealand Listener, the New Zealand Herald and The Dominion Post. He is also a contributing editor for Wellington-based Lawrence & Gibson publishing collective, alongside Murdoch Stephens.

== Select publications ==
- U.X.O. (Wellington: Lawrence & Gibson, 2026).
- The Life and Opinions of Kartik Popat (Wellington: Lawrence & Gibson, 2024) ISBN 978-0-473-72597-6
- Slow Down, You're Here (Wellington: Lawrence & Gibson, 2022) ISBN 978-0-473-61732-5
- Sprigs (Wellington: Lawrence & Gibson, 2020). ISBN 9780473526382
- Sodden Downstream (Wellington: Lawrence & Gibson, 2017). ISBN 9780473410292
- A Briefcase, Two Pies and a Penthouse (Wellington: Lawrence & Gibson, 2016). ISBN 9780473356347
- Credit in the Straight World (Wellington: Lawrence & Gibson, 2015). ISBN 9780473319106
- You Should Have Come Here When You Were Not Here (Wellington: Lawrence & Gibson, 2013). ISBN 9780473257187
- Getting Under Sail (Wellington: Lawrence & Gibson, 2011). ISBN 9780473184674
