= Refugees in New Zealand =

Refugee migration into New Zealand

Refugees in New Zealand have two main pathways for gaining protection in the country. Asylum seekers may seek protection after arrival in New Zealand (either as refugees or protected persons). Refugees may also be resettled from offshore through New Zealand's Refugee Quota Programme. In 2017/18 a community sponsorship pathway was trialled, extended from 2021.

A refugee who is resettled into New Zealand is granted permanent residency and may apply for citizenship. Much of the discussion in recent years has focussed on whether the annual United Nations High Commissioner for Refugees (UNHCR) resettlement quota is adequate, focussed on the most vulnerable and on the outcomes for refugees coming through this system. New Zealand is one of the few countries in the world that receive more quota refugees than asylum applications. The resettlement process is primarily managed by Immigration New Zealand, who contract out settlement services to numerous community organisations including New Zealand Red Cross.

== History of refugees in New Zealand ==
Even before the 1951 United Nations Convention was being adopted by member states, New Zealand accepted refugees.

Those granted refugee status prior to the UNHCR Convention were

- 1100 German Jewish refugees, during the 1930s
- 837 Polish refugees, mostly children, who arrived in 1944
- 4,500 refugees from Europe, between 1949 and 1952

New Zealand acceded to the UNHCR Convention in 1960, and refugee policy is based on the obligations that flow from that, namely to offer protection to refugees. The text is currently set out in the Sixth Schedule of the Immigration Act 1987. The Immigration Act is not a description of policy, but rather a framework for assessing and determining claims made by people in New Zealand seeking refugee status. The 1987 Act formalised an annual resettlement quota of 800 places, which was decreased to 750 places in 1997.

Those granted refugee status post the signing of the UNHCR Convention were:

- Approximately 1,100 Hungarian refugees following the1956 Hungarian revolution
- In 1965, 80 Russian Christians belonging to the Old Believers religious group
- Around 125 Czechoslovaks from the 1968 Prague uprising
- 244 Asians fleeing Uganda during president Idi Amin’s expulsion of Asians in the 1970s
- 354 Chileans fleeing the government of General Pinochet from 1974-1981
- 335 Soviet Jews, 292 Poles, and 507 Eastern European refugees fleeing Soviet control from 1974-1991
- Those fleeing wars in Vietnam, including 5,200 Cambodians, 4,500 Vietnamese, and 1,200 Laotians between 1977 and 1993
- Baha'i refugees fleeing the Iran-Iraq war in 1979 and from 1987-1989
- Burma, Somalia, Ethiopia, Sri Lanka, Sudan, and the former Yugoslavia in the 1990s
- Since 2000, Burundi, Eritrea, Djibouti, and Bhutan
- Colombian refugees since 2008.
- Syrian refugees from 2014.

In 2009, the incoming National government moved to a focus on refugees in the Asia-Pacific region which substantially decreased the number of refugees coming from both the Middle East and Africa. New Zealand now restricts quota refugees from both the Middle East and African unless (a) they already have family in New Zealand, (b) they are part of an emergency quota outside of the annual intake or (c) refugees from this region are able to register with the UNHCR outside of the Middle East and Africa. These restrictions have led to prominent advocates comparing New Zealand's policies to the "Muslim Ban" of Donald Trump.

After the Mosque attacks in Christchurch in 2019, attention turned to the coalition government's continued restrictions on African and Middle Eastern refugees. Immigration Minister Iain Lees-Galloway described the policy as "the very definition of discrimination" and indicated the policy would be reviewed. Both the Prime Minister Jacinda Ardern and the Foreign Minister Winston Peters questioned whether the policy was racist, but also indicated the policy - as well as the broader make-up of the quota - was under review.

In early October 2019, the Immigration Minister Iain Lees-Galloway announced that the Labour-led coalition government would be scrapping the discriminatory requirement that African and Middle Eastern refugee applicants already have relatives who were residing in New Zealand. While the African and Middle Eastern regions had their refugee allocation quota increased from 14% to 15%, the Government would still continues its focus on the Asia-Pacific region, which is allocated 50% on the annual refugee quota. This change followed criticism of the Government's refugee resettlement policy by refugee advocates Guled Mire and Murdoch Stephens, petition from World Vision, and comments from Race Relations Commissioner Meng Foon.

On 16 May 2020, the Green Party's immigration spokesperson Golriz Ghahraman announced that the Government will be doubling the cap on New Zealands' family reunification scheme from 300 to 600 over the next three years under a new NZ$21 million funding boost. For the first time in the programme's history, funding would go towards the programme that would take away some of the burden on sponsoring families.

In mid-March 2022, the New Zealand Government introduced a two-year work visa programme allowing New Zealand citizens and residents of Ukrainian descent to sponsor Ukrainian family members seeking to shelter in New Zealand following the 2022 Russian invasion of Ukraine. This "Special Ukraine Policy" aims to bring over 4,000 Ukrainians to New Zealand and comes with work and study rights.

On 24 March 2022, the New Zealand and Australian Governments agreed to accept 450 asylum seekers over a three year period from the Nauru Regional Processing Centre and those temporarily in Australia for "processing." Refugees being resettled in New Zealand will have to go through the United Nations High Commissioner for Refugees (UNHCR) process and meet the criteria for NZ's refugee quota requirements. The Morrison government had decided to accept a 2012 deal between former New Zealand Prime Minister John Key and Australian Prime Minister Julia Gillard for New Zealand to accept several asylum seekers who had travelled to Australia by sea. Subsequent Australian governments had reneged on New Zealand's offer due to concerns that it would encourage more asylum seekers to travel by boat to Australia and that former asylum seekers could enter Australia via New Zealand.

== The refugee quota (resettlement) ==
Historically in New Zealand, the largest number of refugees have arrived through the quota refugee system. New Zealand is still one of a handful of countries that takes the majority of their refugees through a quota system. Each year, New Zealand accepts approximately 1,500 refugees as part of an agreement with the United Nations High Commissioner for Refugees (UNHCR). These people have been assessed as refugees with a high need of protection by UNHCR and referred to New Zealand, based on the regional allocations decided every three years by the government. Since 2020, the top countries for refugee quota arrivals have been Syria, Afghanistan, Colombia, Myanmar, the Democratic Republic of Congo and Pakistan.

The quota is set every three years, with the next decision due to be made and implemented in July 2025. Included within the current quota are places for women at risk (>150), medical/disabled (<75), large scale crisis response (200 - used for Syrians in 2022/23), which are decided year by year, and emergency protection (100) cases. The rest of the cases are general humanitarian In doing so the country offers some preferential places for those who are already marginalised and vulnerable, and for whom it is the most difficult to find resettlement locations. For this New Zealand had gained international respect for its humanitarianism. Refugees who have been resettled can apply to sponsor relatives to join them, though those being sponsored need not be refugees themselves and there is a significant backlog of places across both Tier One and Tier Two of this Refugee Family Support Category.

=== Settlement locations ===
Those refugees arriving under the UNHCR quota, arrive in Auckland in groups of about 180, and stay for the first six weeks at the Mangere Refugee Resettlement Centre. They are offered a programme of residential and employment orientation, and then move off to one of the seven major resettlement areas, Auckland (restricted to family connected cases in 2016), Hamilton, Palmerston North, Wellington, Nelson, Christchurch, Dunedin and, Invercargill. To accommodate the increased refugee quota in 2020 and the pressure in other regions, five more regions – Levin, Masterton, Blenheim, Timaru and Ashburton – were added as resettlement locations.

Asylum seekers who apply for refugee status on shore are usually allowed to live in the community, with none being placed in prison or detention since a report and inquiry in 2021. During the first year of resettlement, the government provides quota refugees basic housing, employment and health services. If they are found to be genuine refugees they will be granted residence, then they are technically able to access Social welfare in New Zealand and the same benefits provided by the state as any permanent resident. In practice, however, accessing these services is a slow and difficult process.

=== Double The Quota campaign ===
In June 2013 Doing Our Bit, a small Wellington-based charitable trust led by Murdoch Stephens launched the Double The Quota campaign. The campaign had two goals: to double the number of refugees welcomed through the annual resettlement quota from 750 to 1500 and to double the funding for resettlement services. The campaign justified this increase based on population growth since the quota was set at 800 places in 1987, and a sharp decrease in the number of asylum seekers accepted from 2001 onwards. They argued that the quota had not increased for three decades, that Australia welcomed five times as many refugees per capita as New Zealand, and that New Zealand ranked around 90th in the world at hosting refugees per capita.

Prior to the 2014 election only the Green Party and United Future had policies on increasing the quota. The National party had a policy of decreasing the quota to 500 places in 2002 but this policy was not continued, nor implemented when they gained power in 2008. At the 2014 election the Labour party indicated they would support raising the quota to 1,000.

In early 2015 Amnesty International joined the call to double the quota. The public awakening to the refugee crisis in August of that year led to doubling the quota becoming a popular argument for how New Zealand should respond, gaining support from mayors, churches, other NGOs, the National Party's youth wing, and media commentators. Public pressure saw the government agree to admit 600 additional Syrian refugees, with 150 places also set aside from within the quota for Syrians. They also said they would consider increasing the quota at the triennial review due in 2016.

A broad-based campaign ran in the first six months of 2016 to encourage the government to double the quota. While it was ultimately unsuccessful in that goal, the government did set in place an increase of the quota to 1,000 places for July 2018. More importantly, United Future, Labour and the Greens all took on a policy of doubling the quota.

In the lead up to the 2017 election, Doing Our Bit continued the campaign with a nationwide speaking tour securing pledges of Members of Parliament and candidates to double the quota. Among those signing was then deputy leader of the opposition, Jacinda Ardern. When Ardern eventually became Opposition leader and then leader of the coalition government with New Zealand First, she reiterated that the refugee quota would grow to 1,500 places. The Green party also secured a review of the numbers admitted under family reunification for their confidence and supply support. In August 2018, a book by Stephens was released documenting the campaign through publisher Bridget Williams Books.

On 19 September 2018, the Sixth Labour Government announced that New Zealand will raise the annual refugee quota from 1,000 to 1,500 in July 2020, Prime Minister Jacinda Ardern had announced. Labour campaigned on increasing the refugee quota to 1,500 over three years, and providing the funding to manage refugee resettlement. In June 2023, it was announced that the doubled quota had been reached for the first time.

== Asylum seekers ==
New Zealand receives relatively few asylum seekers (the vast majority by air), whose claim is then either approved or declined by the Refugee Status Branch of the Immigration New Zealand, or by the Immigration and Protection Tribunal. In 2022/23, 708 refugee status applications were received; in that same time there were 104 people approved at a rate of 21.6%. Assistance that addresses asylum seeker's specific needs as they attempt to integrate into New Zealand is very limited.

=== Asylum seekers by boat ===
New Zealand has had a long-standing concern about boat arrivals of asylum seekers with particular public concern during the Vietnam War and in the late 1990s. New Zealand has been an active participant in the Bali Process to prevent boat arrivals. No mass boat arrival has ever made it to New Zealand, although small numbers of individuals have arrived on passenger, cargo or other boats and subsequently lodged an asylum claim.

In 2013 a Migration Amendment Bill was introduced which would allow the government to mandatorily detain refugees who arrive by boat in groups of ten or more. The bill, colloquially referred to as the Mass Arrivals Bill, was passed as the Migration Amendment Act 2014 but only after Peter Dunne insisted the number rise from ten to thirty people.

Refugee advocates have claimed that the New Zealand government is scare-mongering over asylum seekers in a manner similar to that deployed in Australian politics. In January 2018, leaked intelligence reports to Australian media suggested Australian authorities reportedly turned around four new boats just before Christmas 2017, and intelligence sources have said Ardern's criticisms of Australia's refugee policy are the likely cause. However former Australian Border Force Commissioner Roman Quaedvlieg, said before the May 2018 attempt from Malaysia there "was only ever one vessel intercepted south of Papua New Guinea that was capable of reaching NZ physically and with an experienced crew; this one also looks like it could have."

A number of refugees or reports have claimed that asylum seekers are attempting to travel to New Zealand in recent years. Examples include:

- Jun 2011: 85 Tamils were detained by Indonesia's maritime police off Sumatra, who were claiming they were travelling to New Zealand. New Zealand Immigration Minister Jonathan Coleman said there was "no concrete evidence" that the Sri Lankan people were actually trying to reach New Zealand.
- Apr 2012: 10 Chinese asylum seekers attempting to travel to NZ by boat in April 2012 who were taken to Darwin after making a distress call" Another source report that they eventually decided not to seek asylum in New Zealand but elected to claim asylum in Australia
- May 2015: the Andika (see below).
- Dec 2017: an Australian naval patrol intercepted a boatload of 29 Sri Lankans off the coast of Western Australia. Those on board told Australian authorities they were bound for New Zealand.
- May 2018: Malaysian police intercepted a tanker with 131 Sri Lankans believed bound for Australia and New Zealand.
- Jan 2019: Australian and Malaysian agencies combined forces to bust the operation, which was preparing to send a boat with 24 Sri Lankans and 10 Indians, including 11 women and seven children [to Australia or New Zealand].
- Jan 2019: A fishing boat with between 100 and 200 people on board is reportedly on its way to Australia or New Zealand, according to media reports quoting local police in India. The vessel left a port in the southern state of Kerala on 12 January and was never heard from again.
- October 2021: 64 men were arrested in Sri Lanka for allegedly trying to organise a boat to New Zealand. The boat did not leave and there is no evidence the plan was advanced.

New legislation was introduced to Parliament in the final year of the sixth Labour government, but did not pass before the House rose. Both the National and Green parties, as well as almost all submitters, opposed the bill. The bill was reinstated by the sixth National Government and has the support of coalition partners.

==== The Andika ====
In May 2015 a ship with passengers including 54 Sri Lankans (Tamils), 10 Bangladeshis, one person from Myanmar (Rohingya) and five additional crew was sailing towards New Zealand in international waters. According to an Amnesty International report the boat had a credible chance of arriving in New Zealand however it was intercepted by Australian authorities outside of Australian jurisdiction. The treatment of these refugees was also documented in the 2019 film Stop the Boats - the lie of savings lives at sea.

The boat departed from Indonesia on 5 May and was first intercepted by Australian forces on 17 May 2015, and again on 22 May when the refugees were removed. They were sent back on two less seaworthy boats, and shipwrecked off Rote Island, Indonesia on 31 May 2015. News about the ship broke on 1 June 2015 by the Indonesian police

On 2 June 2015, New Zealand Prime Minister John Key was asked about the situation in the New Zealand media. He said if one boat made it New Zealand "it would open up a pretty easy pathway to replicate". In one interview he would not say which New Zealand authorities first found out about the boat, or whether New Zealand's spy agencies had been involved, saying it was "a while ago, but I can't really go into all the details for some obvious reasons, but yeah, I knew some time ago." In another interview however he said they had been advised "a couple of weeks back" about the seaworthiness of the boat to reach New Zealand and was getting daily updates from ODESC. Labour politicians attacked Key in parliament for scare-mongering denying the possibility of the boat arriving. The Green Party raised the possibility that the New Zealand intelligence agencies had been involved in tracking the boat and if so were "complicit in violating international law, the Refugee Convention and ignoring the UN’s criticism of Australia".

Newspaper editorials strongly criticised the operation and called on PM John Key to distance the government from likely payments made by Australia to the ship to the ships crew to be turned around. This was also raised by Michael Timmins Former Green MP Keith Locke said the incident "raises the question of whether the Australian navy is under instructions from the New Zealand government to intercept any such boat and send it back to Indonesia." Ahead of the 2017 general election a number of MPs and activists signed an open-letter calling on the government to bring the passengers of the Andika to New Zealand to have their asylum claims assessed in New Zealand

== Other intakes ==
=== Community sponsorship ===
In August 2017, the Fifth National Government approved a pilot "Community Organisation Refugee Sponsorship Category (CORS) Category" scheme, that was launched in 2018 in response to the 2015 European migrant crisis. This scheme allowed 24 refugees to settle in New Zealand with the support of four community organisations. The CORS scheme is separate to New Zealand's annual refugee quota of 1,500. Refugees participated in the CORS programmed must meet the United Nations' refugee criteria, "which means they have been displaced from their own country because of persecution, conflict, violence or "seriously disturbed public order", and require international protection."

By November 2018, Amnesty International New Zealand confirmed that 23 people had been resettled in New Zealand under the Community Organisation Refugee Sponsorship programme. That same year, Amnesty International submitted a petition with 10,276 signatures to Immigration Minister Iain Lees-Galloway calling for the CORS scheme to be made permanent. The petition received the support of Green Party co-leader Marama Davidson, Green MP Golriz Ghahraman, Labour MP Michael Wood and Mayor of Wellington Justin Lester. Prominent journalist and media commentator Alison Mau described the extension of the pilot as, politically "2019's most obvious no-brainer." In the 2020 budget, the trial was extended for three years with 50 places available per year and a co-design process set to be launched.

As part of the 2020 budget, the Sixth Labour Government extended the CORS scheme from 1 July 2021 to 30 June 2024, allowing 50 community sponsored refugees a year for each financial year to be settled in New Zealand; amounting to a total of 150 people over a period of three years. In addition, a co-design process set was launched.

In September 2021, Radio New Zealand reported that applications for refugee sponsors would open in October 2021. Immigration New Zealand's manager for refugee and migrant support Sarah Ward confirmed that community groups could nominate someone to sponsor or be matched with a person in need. Refugees participating in the Community Organisation Refugee Sponsorship programme need to have a basic level of English and either three years of work experience or two years of tertiary study. By December 2021, an umbrella organisation called HOST Aotearoa had been set up to aid refugees' integration into New Zealand and to provide training and support for community organisations including accessing support by government agencies.

In late June 2026, Associate Immigration Minister Casey Costello announced that Community Organisation Refugee Sponsorship scheme would be made permanent from July 2026 and also expanded to 200 spaces per annum from 2027. The community refugee scheme will operate alongside the Government's Refugee Quota Progamme, which has an annual intake of 1,500 refugees a year.

=== 2021 Afghan evacuation and subsequent intake ===
Following the 2021 Taliban offensive that reinstated Taliban rule in Afghanistan in mid–August 2021, the New Zealand Government dispatched military forces including a Royal New Zealand Air Force C-130 Hercules plane to assist in international evacuation efforts at Hamid Karzai International Airport in Kabul. Besides New Zealand citizens and residents, NZ forces were tasked with evacuating Afghans who had assisted the New Zealand Defence Force and their families. By 23 August, the first batch of Afghan evacuees had arrived in New Zealand via the United Arab Emirates, with the Australian Defence Force helping to facilitate their travel to New Zealand.

On 26 August, the Ministry of Foreign Affairs and Trade (MFAT) suspended the processing of residency applications from Afghan nationals in late August 2021, citing the deteriorating situation in Afghanistan. The suspension of Afghan residency applications was criticised by human rights advocates and Afghan migrants. Former Afghan interpreter Diamond Kazimi stated that 200 Afghan families who had assisted the NZDF were still waiting for their visa applications to be processed. On 26 August, the RNZAF completed its last evacuation flight from Kabul following the 2021 Kabul airport attacks. By that stage, about 300 of the 520 people in Afghanistan registered with MFAT had been evacuated.

In response to the Afghan crisis, the University of Waikato law academic Alexander Gillespie called on the Government to do a one-off intake of 1,500 additional refugees on top of the country's existing refugee quota. Similarly, the Council for International Development's (CID) Humanitarian Manager Aaron Davy called on the Government to lift the refugee quota to 1,000 in order to take in Afghan refugees and to increase humanitarian aid to Afghanistan.

In early November 2021, Community Law Waikato challenged Immigration New Zealand's decision to stop processing visas by Afghan migrants and refugees in 2020. Crown lawyer Robert Kirkness defended the department's decision, citing New Zealand's COVID-19 border restrictions. On 23 November, the High Court ruled against Immigration NZ's decision to cease processing Afghan interpreters' visas due to the COVID-19 pandemic and for not making humanitarian grounds following the Taliban takeover. Immigration NZ subsequently defied the High Court's ruling and issued a new ruling suspending the processing of Afghan visa applications, contending that the humanitarian crisis was irrelevant to the processing of travel requests. Following a second judicial challenge by Community Law Waikato, the High Court rejected Immigration NZ's decision to cease processing Afghan visa applications. However, evacuation plans were hindered by the suspension of MFAT-sponsored emergency flights during the 2021–2022 summer season.

In early February 2022, Radio New Zealand reported that only 17 of the 77 Afghan applicants since November 2021 had received a Family Support Category visa and that these 17 were unable to enter the country due to a lack of official assistance. MFAT had declined to assist them on the grounds that these visa holders did not fit the criteria to get help, which focused on people who helped New Zealand agencies in Afghanistan and their immediate families. Immigration New Zealand had initially assigned two staff members to process their visas following the court ruling but had since increased the number of personnel to nine. Community Law CEO Sue Moroney criticised the Government for blocking Afghan applicants from resettling in New Zealand.

== Notable refugees in New Zealand ==
The following people are former refugees who settled in New Zealand:

- Daniel Gamboa – Colombian-born New Zealand refugee rights advocate, Justice of the Peace (JP), and co-founder and chief executive of the New Zealand National Refugee Youth Council.
- Behrouz Boochani - Kurdish-Iranian writer and journalist.
- Rez Gardi - Harvard-educated, international lawyer and Young New Zealander of the Year 2017.
- Golriz Ghahraman - Oxford-educated, UN lawyer and New Zealand's first refugee member of parliament. Elected as a list candidate for the New Zealand Green Party.
- Guled Mire - prominent community advocate, writer and senior policy advisor. He is also a media commentator on refugee, race and Muslim issues, especially related to the Christchurch Mosque attacks.
- Ibrahim Omer - Labour Party List MP, New Zealand's first African member of parliament and former refugee from Eritrea.
- Eliana Rubashkyn - Stateless refugee born in Colombia whose gender was recognised internationally under a UN resolution.
- Jorge Sandoval - Chilean cyclist and Member of New Zealand Order of Merit (MNZM).
- Omar Slaimankhel - professional rugby league player, born in Pakistan to parents from Afghanistan.
- Ahmed Zaoui - Algerian asylum seeker, politicians and poet.

New Zealand is also home to numerous high-profile second-generation refugees including Sir John Key, investigative journalist Nicky Hager and blogger David Farrar.
