= On the Conditions and Possibilities of Helen Clark Taking Me as Her Young Lover =

Satirical 2005 book, adapted to play by Arthur Meek and Geoff Pinfield

- Author: Richard Meros
- Language: English
- Genre: Humor
- Publication date: 2005

On the Conditions and Possibilities of Helen Clark Taking Me as Her Young Lover is a satirical book, published in 2005 with a new edition released in 2008, by the pseudonymous author Richard Meros, and an adapted play of the same name written by Arthur Meek and Geoff Pinfield.

== Book ==
The book was conceived while the author was in Minneapolis, and completed while he was writing a Masters thesis at Victoria University of Wellington. It centres on the author's belief that Helen Clark, then Prime Minister of New Zealand, would find personal and political rejuvenation if she was to take on a younger lover, and that the ideal person to be that lover is Meros. The author contends that Helen Clark is a woman of intellectual pursuits and that:

"her surroundings of subordinates ... probably leaves her with unfulfilled desires for a situation where roles are reversed and she can become the double-double agent of gender deconstructions."

It covers such subjects as Rogernomics and a bus strike. The book also contains detailed descriptions of flesh and bodily fluids.

The first edition was published by Lawrence and Gibson had a print-run of only 50 copies, but further editions were subsequently released. As of January 2008 the author claimed that only 16 copies had been sold, but in August of that year, after the success of the play, stated that over 400 had been sold.

Promotional image.

=== Critical reception ===
The Guardian described the book as a treatise of "sociology, psychoanalysis and cringe-making erotica".

== Stage adaptation ==
The book was adapted for stage by actor Arthur Meek and director Geoff Pinfield, and premiered at Wellington's BATS Theatre in early 2008. In the play Meek portrays Meros giving a PowerPoint presentation lecture tour, narrating why Helen Clark needs a young lover, bringing the issue to the Prime Minister's attention, and impressing her intellect:

"She is a very rational woman. It would take more than chocolates or flowers to woo her. The show is designed to appeal to that rationality"

He critiques individualist liberalism and imagines being taken by Clark to a secret "pleasure dome" and bolsters his argument with Kantian theory. The play was well received critically and described as "slightly disturbing, but highly entertaining... sharp political satire". The play is said to have been seen by staffers of Helen Clark, and recommended by her husband Peter Davis. After a successful first season the play toured New Zealand, and returned to Wellington's Downstage Theatre for a second season.
