= Lawrence & Gibson =

- Founded: 2005
- Country of origin: New Zealand
- Headquarters location: Wellington
- Publication types: Books (fiction)
- Official website: www.lawrenceandgibson.co.nz

Lawrence & Gibson is an independent publisher founded in Wellington, New Zealand in 2005. The organisation functions as a non-profit worker collective where profits are split 50/50 between author and publisher.

Their most notable releases are Richard Meros' On the Conditions and Possibilities of Helen Clark Taking Me as Her Young Lover (2005) and Brannavan Gnanalingam's Sprigs (2020). As of 2023, the collective is steered by Murdoch Stephens (co-founder), Brannavan Gnanalingam (2011) and Thomasin Sleigh, all of whom have released multiple titles with the collective.

== Notable authors ==
Notable authors include Richard Meros, William Dewey, Brannavan Gnanalingam, Thomasin Sleigh, Murdoch Stephens, Alice Tawhai, Tīhema Baker, Rhydian Thomas, and Sharon Lam. The Dominion Post described it as one of the capital city's most promising independent publishers.

The collective announced that the 2023 release of Turncoat by Tīhema Baker was their new best selling novel, replacing the previous bestseller Sprigs.

== Publications and awards ==
In 2016, Gnanalingam's A Briefcase, Two Pies and a Penthouse, which was long-listed for novel of the year in New Zealand's Ockham Book Awards. The following year, his novel Sodden Downstream was short-listed for the Ockham New Zealand Book Awards novel of the year.

Both of their 2017 novels—Milk Island and Sodden Downstream —received critical acclaim. Milk Island was judged as the fifth best book of 2017 by the Spinoff, while Sodden Downstream was described by the same publication as 'surely the best local novel of 2017 by a long stretch. No other novel comes close to achieving such a close examination of life in New Zealand right now.'

The 2019 release of Lonely Asian Woman by Sharon Lam marked the twenty-fifth publication from the collective. The novel was long-listed for the Ockham New Zealand Book Awards novel of the year.

In 2020, the publisher and founder of Lawrence & Gibson, Murdoch Stephens revealed himself as the author behind the Richard Meros novels. Concurrently, the collective released a debut novel under Stephens' own name Rat King Landlord.

Gnanalingam's sixth book with the collective, Sprigs, was released to widespread acclaim in 2020. It was short-listed for the best fiction of the year and described by The Spinoff as "having that rare thing in a novel: impetus" . The success of the novel led to Gnanalingam authoring a fortnightly column in the Sunday Star-Times. Sprigs won the Ngaio Marsh Award for best work of crime fiction in the 2021 ceremony.

In 2026 a number of events were slated to celebrate their 21st birthday, including a panel at Word Christchurch. At the same time, the collective released three new books, including a debut from Frances Pavletich, Brannavan Gnanalingam's U.X.O. and Murdoch Stephens' Pākehā Metapahysics.
