= Helengrad =

Neologism in New Zealand politics

Helengrad is a satirical or pejorative term applied to New Zealand's capital city Wellington as the seat of Helen Clark's Fifth Labour Government. It was employed by the Labour Party's opponents and critics to underscore the perceived characteristics and political climate of Wellington during Clark's tenure, often extending to reflect the entirety of New Zealand at the time.

In January 2008, the neologism Helengrad, "a noun used to describe the iron grip of New Zealand's prime minister over Wellington", was reported as having entered Australia's Macquarie online dictionary, along with 85 other new words.

== Origin ==
The Helen aspect is derived from Helen Clark, Prime Minister of New Zealand from 1999 to 2008. The suffix -grad (-град in Cyrillic) alludes to cities of the former Soviet Union named after political leaders, such as Leningrad and Stalingrad. The term was used derisively by political opponents of Clark and the Labour Party to equate their ideology and political views with socialism and communism. In a similar way they referred to Helen Clark as "Comrade Helen".

== Usage ==
The term was reputedly first used by a caller to Lindsay Perigo's 'Politically Incorrect Show' on Radio Pacific in late 1999 or early 2000, and went on to gain traction in the media and in political circles following its appearance on the cover of the May/June 2000 issue of the magazine 'The Free Radical,' published early April 2000. A commentary in the Evening Post ascribed the reason to the nickname "Does she (Helen Clark) know the Capital's earned the nickname, Helengrad, such is her total command of issues, initiatives and air time?"

In a 2000 feature article, "Siege of Helengrad," The Australian newspaper wrote that Clark's "uncompromisingly autocratic and pervasive leadership has seen New Zealand dubbed Helengrad".

== See also ==
- Fifth Labour Government of New Zealand
