= Murdoch Stephens =

New Zealand author

Murdoch Stephens (born 1981) is a New Zealand author, researcher and refugee advocate. He is founding editor of Lawrence & Gibson publishing and previously wrote under the name Richard Meros. In 2013 he founded the Double the Refugee Quota campaign that led to the doubling of New Zealand's refugee quota in 2020.

Stephens was raised in South Otago and attended South Otago High School, before studying at the University of Otago.

== Advocacy and academic work ==
After living in Syria, prior to the Civil War, and finding a series of photos of Afghan refugees, Stephens began the Double the Quota campaign in 2013.

By the time of the 2017 election, the campaign had gained prominence with civil society, media and political parties. His experience of the campaign was published as a book by Bridget Williams Books in 2018. Stephens also campaigned against race-based restrictions in New Zealand's refugee quota, which were removed in late 2019.

Stephens completed a PhD, which was published as an academic book in 2018. He lectured at Massey University before becoming a Senior Research Fellow at the University of Auckland's Centre for Asia Pacific Refugee Studies (CAPRS).

In 2025, he published Visas Now! Aotearoa's response to global humanitarian emergencies on how New Zealand responded to refugee crises with a chapter each on Syria, Afghanistan and Ukraine in the past ten years.The book featured an introduction from Ibrahim Omer and contributions from former refugees and community members including Behrouz Boochani.

== Fiction ==
=== As Richard Meros ===
Richard Meros is a pseudonym used by Stephens, as well as appearing as a character in another of his novels, released under the name Nestor Notabilis. Prior to the revelation of his identity, it had been speculated that Meros' real persona was either Stephens, actor Arthur Meek or one of the other members of Lawrence & Gibson publishing.

First published in 2005, On the Conditions and Possibilities of Helen Clark Taking Me as Her Young Lover, received favourable reviews in New Zealand and international press. The book, often shortened to OTC&POHCTMAHYL, asked why Helen Clark, the Prime Minister at the time would want a young lover and then why the young lover would be Meros. The book is a work of metafiction as it concludes that the greatest likelihood of Meros being taken as a young lover would be if he wrote a book on the conditions and possibilities of being taken as a young lover. The Guardian described it as 'decidedly lascivious' and the NZ Listener called it a 'mock philosophical treatise' before praising it as 'the underground publishing hit of the decade'.

The book was reissued and adapted into a play of the same name in 2007, touring nationally and was nominated for theatrical performance of the year. For his role as Meros, Arthur Meek was awarded the most promising male newcomer of 2008 at the Chapman Tripp Awards. In 2015, the book was once again adapted into a play that substitutes Hillary Clinton for Helen Clark.

In total, Stephens has released eight books under the Meros pseudonym through Lawrence & Gibson in New Zealand, including novels and political/cultural satire, though none have achieved the success of On the conditions and possibilities of Helen Clark taking me as her Young Lover. These other books include two adapted for theatre, both of which toured widely:

- In 2007 Stephens released Richard Meros salutes the Southern Man, a pastoral account of the cultural persona of a male from the south of New Zealand's South Island. This was adapted by the same team that made on the conditions and possibilities of Helen Clark taking me as her Young Lover and toured to positive reviews winning best touring production at the Dunedin Theatre Awards. The book was reissued for the theatrical tour with an introduction by Duncan Sarkies.
- When Privatising Parts was released in 2011, it was viewed by New Zealand media as a follow up to on the conditions and possibilities of Helen Clark taking me as her Young Lover. This book was adapted into a play that toured New Zealand and Australia in 2012 and 2013.

As Meros he has also written for a wide range of publications in New Zealand from current affairs magazine NZ Listener and daily newspaper the Dominion Post to arts publications White Fungus and Pantograph Punch. In 2015, he was a recipient of Eleanor Catton's Horoeka Grant. In response he wrote the essay 'New Bourgeoizealand'.

=== As Murdoch Stephens ===
In 2020, he released his first novel under his own name, Rat King Landlord, with Lawrence & Gibson. The book was well received featuring on best of the year lists and was subsequently praised as "last year's surprise literary hit". The novel led to some public commentary on the problems with New Zealand's housing market, and a 2023 partnership with Renters United to re-release ten thousand copies of the novel in tabloid format with launches and events around the county.

In 2022 he released Down from Upland, which was long-listed for the Jann Medlicott Acorn Prize for Fiction, Ockham New Zealand Book Awards 2023. Writing in Landfall, Craig Cliff, said:

Just as the content of the novel revolves around maturity, how teenagers seek it and Millennial parents shirk it, Down from Upland feels like a confident stride towards a new, fully-fledged form for Murdoch Stephens.

In addition to being an author he maintains his role of an editor at Lawrence & Gibson publishing and regularly writes for a range of news media including the Spinoff and Stuff.

== Selected publications ==
=== Novels ===
As Murdoch Stephens:

- Rat King Landlord Lawrence & Gibson (2020)
  - Rat King Landlord - Renters United edition (2023)
- Down from Upland Lawrence & Gibson (2022)

As Richard Meros:

- On the Conditions and Possibilities of Helen Clark Taking Me as Her Young Lover Lawrence & Gibson (2005) ISBN 978-0-473-10248-7
- Richard Meros salutes the Southern Man Lawrence & Gibson (2007) ISBN 978-0-473-12429-8
- Beggars & Choosers: The Complete Written Correspondence between Richard Meros and Creative New Zealand volume one Lawrence & Gibson (2008) ISBN 978-0-473-14005-2
- Privatising Parts Lawrence & Gibson (2011) ISBN 978-0-473-18475-9
- Zebulon: A cautionary tale Lawrence & Gibson (2011) ISBN 978-0-473-18836-8
- Easy Whistle Solo Lawrence & Gibson (2012) ISBN 978-0-473-21922-2
- $30 Meat Pack: The Complete Written Correspondence between Richard Meros and Creative New Zealand volume two Lawrence & Gibson (2012) ISBN 978-0-473-22900-9
- Dating Westerners: tips for the new rich of the developing world Lawrence & Gibson (2014) ISBN 978-0-473-27501-3

=== Non Fiction books ===
- Visas Now! Aotearoa's response to global refugee emergencies. Left of the Equator (2025)
- Doing Our Bit: the campaign to double the refugee quota Bridget Williams Books (2018)
- Critical Environmental Communication: How Does Critique Respond to the Urgency of Climate Change? Lexington Books (2018)

=== Essays ===
- 'On the birth of TEZA' an essay on special economic zones and the TEZA art project.
- 'New Bourgeoizealand' an essay for the Horoeka Grant.
