= 1977 Auckland City mayoral election =

New Zealand mayoral election

← 1974	8 October 1977	1980 →
- Turnout: 41,659 (40.32%)
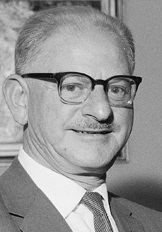

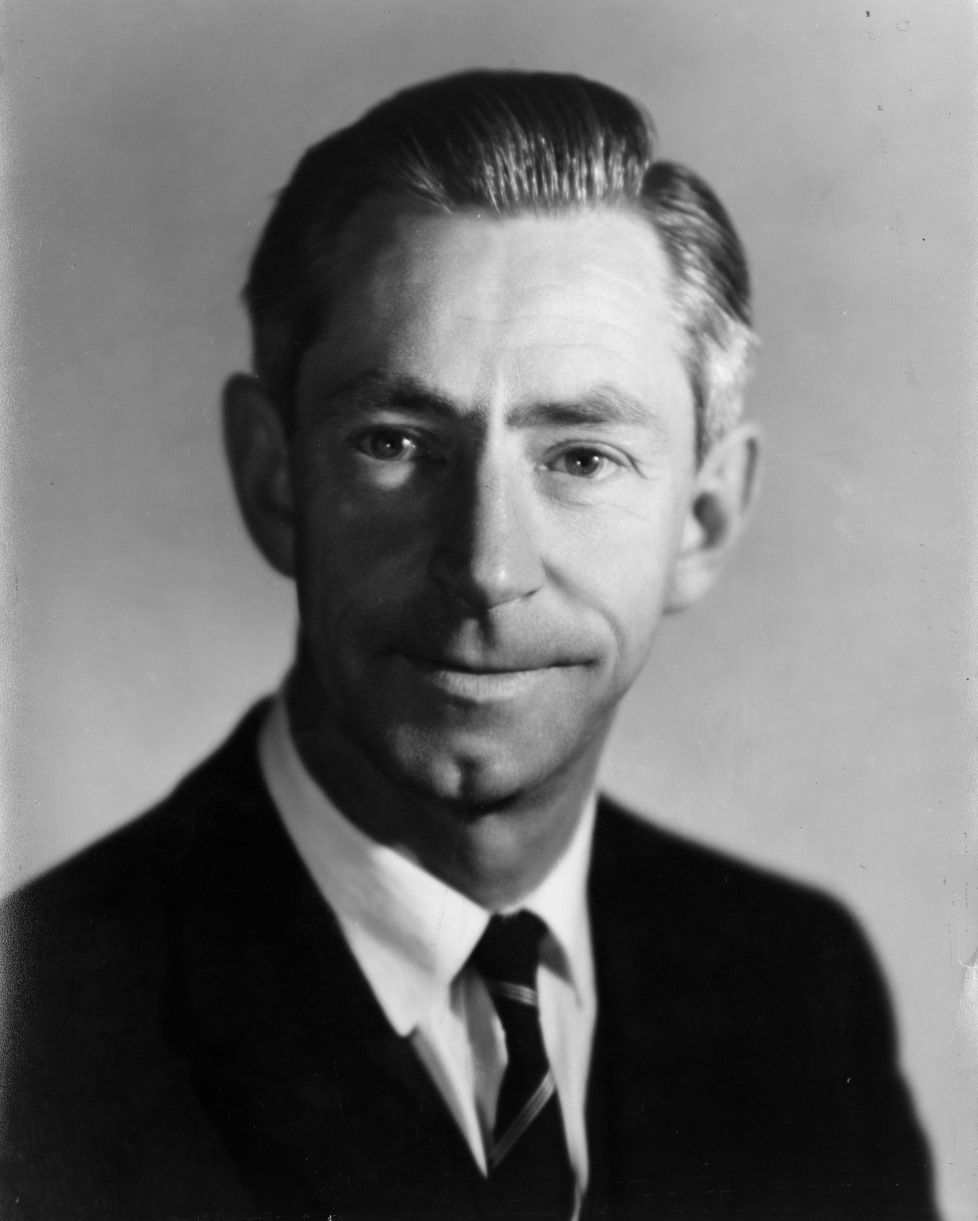
Candidate	Dove-Myer Robinson	Jim Anderton
Party	Independent	Labour
Popular vote	17,773	12,140
Percentage	42.66	29.14
Candidate	Colin Kay	Mel Tronson
Party	Independent	Citizens & Ratepayers
Popular vote	7,340	4,266
Percentage	17.61	10.24
Mayor before election
Dove-Myer Robinson
Elected mayor
Dove-Myer Robinson

The 1977 Auckland City mayoral election was part of the New Zealand local elections held that same year. In 1977, elections were held for the Mayor of Auckland plus other local government positions including twenty-one city councillors. The polling was conducted using the standard first-past-the-post electoral method.

== Background ==
Incumbent Mayor Dove-Myer Robinson was re-elected seeing off a challenges from Labour Party candidate Jim Anderton, former councillor Colin Kay and Citizens & Ratepayers nominee Mel Tronson.

== Mayoralty results ==
1977 Auckland mayoral election
Party	Candidate	Votes	%	±%
Independent	Dove-Myer Robinson	17,773	42.66	−6.89
Labour	Jim Anderton	12,140	29.14	−2.76
Independent	Colin Kay	7,340	17.61	
Citizens & Ratepayers	Mel Tronson	4,266	10.24	
Independent	Matthew Connor	150	0.36	
Majority		5,633	13.52	−4.14
Turnout		41,659	40.32	−3.12

== Councillor results ==
1977 Auckland City Council election
Party	Candidate	Votes	%	±%
Citizens & Ratepayers	Norman Ambler	23,073	55.38	+2.46
Citizens & Ratepayers	Sue Picot	22,891	54.94	
Citizens & Ratepayers	Sheila Horton	22,780	54.68	+3.68
Citizens & Ratepayers	Paddy Walker	22,161	53.19	+5.39
Citizens & Ratepayers	Jolyon Firth	22,092	53.03	+2.00
Citizens & Ratepayers	Harold Goodman	21,981	52.76	
Citizens & Ratepayers	John Strevens	21,140	50.74	+1.34
Citizens & Ratepayers	Ian McKinnon	20,736	49.77	+1.24
Citizens & Ratepayers	Clive Edwards	20,642	49.54	
Labour	Catherine Tizard	20,576	49.39	+1.77
Citizens & Ratepayers	Selwyn Dawson	20,056	48.14	+3.27
Citizens & Ratepayers	Gordon Barnaby	20,039	48.10	+1.81
Citizens & Ratepayers	Bill Barrett	20,029	48.07	
Citizens & Ratepayers	Keith Max Tongue	19,356	46.46	
Citizens & Ratepayers	Emmett Charles Keenan	18,909	45.38	
Citizens & Ratepayers	Trevor Rogers	18,721	44.93	
Citizens & Ratepayers	Herb Dyer	18,687	44.85	
Citizens & Ratepayers	Maxwell Johnson	18,594	44.63	
Citizens & Ratepayers	Roland Edward Barnes	18,580	44.60	
Citizens & Ratepayers	Bill Clark	18,580	44.60	+3.23
Citizens & Ratepayers	Cec Field	18,348	44.04	+4.86
Citizens & Ratepayers	Bob Johnson	17,701	42.49	
Labour	Helen Clark	16,475	39.54	+3.57
Labour	Alex Dreaver	15,297	36.71	+0.20
Labour	Margaret Wilson	15,084	36.20	
Labour	Richard Northey	14,294	34.31	+0.32
Labour	Maisie Fitton	13,750	33.00	
Labour	Glenda Fryer	13,684	32.84	
Labour	Felicity Christine Lynch	13,475	32.34	
Labour	Brian Francis Healy	13,122	31.49	+3.62
Labour	Sofi Pua	13,081	31.40	
Labour	Audie Cooke-Pennefather	12,911	30.99	
Labour	Helena Rae Philson	12,872	30.89	
Labour	Elsa Smith	12,790	30.70	
Labour	John Clearwater	12,563	30.15	
Labour	Audrey Marion Sharp	12,512	30.03	
Labour	Michael Roger Stenson	12,364	29.67	+0.48
Labour	Michael Joseph Gourley	12,351	29.64	
Labour	Graeme Mark Hansen	12,344	29.63	
Labour	Syd Jackson	12,040	28.90	
Labour	Cecil David Vinson Perkins	11,395	27.35	
Independent	Matthew Connor	7,429	17.83	
Socialist Unity	Bill Andersen	3,513	8.43	+1.89
