= 1983 Auckland City mayoral election =

New Zealand mayoral election

← 1980	8 October 1983	1986 →
- Turnout: 34,035
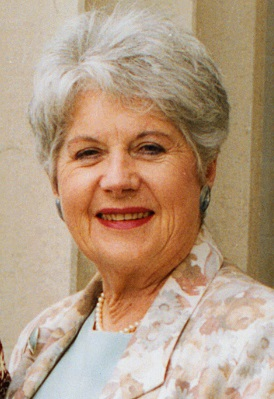

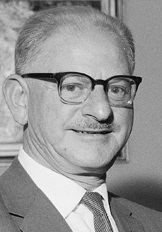
Candidate	Catherine Tizard	Colin Kay
Party	Labour	Independent
Popular vote	11,701	8,559
Percentage	34.37	25.14
Candidate	John Horrocks	Dove-Myer Robinson
Party	Citizens & Ratepayers	Independent
Popular vote	7,393	3,823
Percentage	21.72	11.23
Mayor before election
Colin Kay
Elected mayor
Catherine Tizard

The 1983 Auckland City mayoral election was part of the New Zealand local elections held that same year. In 1983, elections were held for the Mayor of Auckland plus other local government positions including twenty-one city councillors. The polling was conducted using the standard first-past-the-post electoral method.

== Background ==
Incumbent Mayor Colin Kay was defeated by Labour Party candidate Catherine Tizard who became Auckland's first female Mayor and first from the Labour Party, while the council saw a landslide result to the Citizens & Ratepayers ticket who picked up all but one council seat.

It also marked the last time in Auckland where local body elections elected councillors at large.

== Mayoralty results ==
1983 Auckland mayoral election
Party	Candidate	Votes	%	±%
Labour	Catherine Tizard	11,701	34.37	+2.93
Independent	Colin Kay	8,559	25.14	−11.35
Citizens & Ratepayers	John Horrocks	7,393	21.72	
Independent	Dove-Myer Robinson	3,823	11.23	−20.03
Independent	Michael Hart	2,416	7.09	
Independent	Malcolm Moses	78	0.22	
Independent	William Peter Bradley	65	0.19	
Majority		3,142	9.23	
Turnout		34,035		

== Councillor results ==
1983 Auckland City Council election
Party	Candidate	Votes	%	±%
Labour	Catherine Tizard (Note: As Tizard won the Mayoralty her election to the council was voided and her seat was awarded to the highest polling unsuccessful candidate.)	19,923	58.53	+2.19
Citizens & Ratepayers	Harold Goodman	17,332	50.92	−9.55
Citizens & Ratepayers	Elizabeth Currey	15,313	44.99	
Citizens & Ratepayers	Denese Henare	14,837	43.59	
Citizens & Ratepayers	Phil Warren	14,664	43.08	−1.72
Citizens & Ratepayers	Marie Quinn	14,642	43.02	−8.17
Citizens & Ratepayers	John Strevens	14,229	41.80	−13.88
Citizens & Ratepayers	Gordon Barnaby	13,620	40.01	−7.47
Citizens & Ratepayers	Clive Edwards	12,907	37.92	−13.02
Citizens & Ratepayers	Juliet Yates	12,748	37.45	
Citizens & Ratepayers	Bill Clark	12,639	37.13	−7.15
Citizens & Ratepayers	Barrie Hutchinson	12,382	36.38	
Citizens & Ratepayers	Patricia Thorp	12,303	36.14	−15.13
Citizens & Ratepayers	Trevor Rogers	12,203	35.85	−7.45
Citizens & Ratepayers	Sefulu Ioane	11,852	34.82	
Citizens & Ratepayers	Patricia Tauroa	11,772	34.58	
Citizens & Ratepayers	Stephen Kirkwood	11,728	34.45	
Citizens & Ratepayers	Bob Johnson	11,669	34.28	−7.87
Citizens & Ratepayers	Ian McKinnon	11,547	33.92	
Citizens & Ratepayers	Ross Johns	11,099	32.61	
Citizens & Ratepayers	Douglas Ross	10,863	31.91	
Labour	Richard Northey	10,668	31.34	−5.86
Citizens & Ratepayers	Winsbury Robinson	10,520	30.90	
Citizens Independent	Mel Tronson	10,450	30.70	
Independent	Olly Newland	9,634	28.30	−14.09
Labour	Audrey Evans	9,458	27.78	
Labour	Janice Scott	9,312	27.36	
Labour	Elsa Kaye	9,097	26.72	
Labour	James Cullen	8,231	24.18	
Labour	Graham Baird	8,182	24.03	
Labour	John Clarke	8,116	23.84	
Labour	Robin Tulloch	8,049	23.69	
Independent	Selwyn Dawson	8,024	23.57	−12.00
Citizens Independent	Herb Dyer	7,975	23.43	−20.69
Labour	John Collyns	7,923	23.27	
Labour	John Buckingham	7,693	22.60	
Labour	Tepare Kavana	7,471	21.95	
Labour	Alan Graham	7,412	21.77	
Labour	Anthony Daly	7,215	21.19	
Labour	Chris Eichbaum	7,188	21.11	
Labour	Garth Houltham	7,093	20.84	
Labour	John King	7,052	20.71	
Labour	Neil Morris	6,782	19.92	
Labour	Gene Leckey	6,744	19.81	
Labour	Harry Manaman	6,725	19.75	
Labour	Bute Hewes	6,612	19.42	
Labour	Gordon Welsh	6,605	19.40	
Independent	David Christie	5,903	17.34	
Independent	Peter Boys	5,634	16.55	
Independent	Conway McCarthy	5,588	16.41	
Independent	Des Roberts	5,329	15.65	
Independent	Ratu Danieia	5,247	15.41	
Independent	Malcolm Moses	4,728	13.89	
Citizens Alternative	Cec Field	4,658	13.68	
Independent	Alister MacDonald	4,170	12.25	
Independent	Bradley Stanford	3,751	11.02	−7.56
Independent	William Peter Bradley	2,571	7.55	
Socialist Unity	Bill Andersen	2,025	5.94	
Socialist Unity	Peter Devlin	1,256	3.69	

Table footnotes:
