= Catherine Tizard =

Governor-General of New Zealand from 1990 to 1996

The Honourable Dame Catherine Tizard ONZ GCMG GCVO DBE QSO DStJ
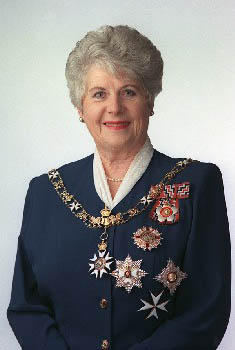

16th Governor-General of New Zealand
- In office 13 December 1990 – 21 March 1996
- Monarch: Elizabeth II
- Prime Minister: Jim Bolger
- Preceded by: Sir Paul Reeves
- Succeeded by: Sir Michael Hardie Boys

35th Mayor of Auckland City
- In office 26 October 1983 – 28 September 1990
- Deputy: John Strevens (1983–86); Harold Goodman (1986–88); Phil Warren (1988–90)
- Preceded by: Colin Kay
- Succeeded by: Les Mills

Spouse of the Deputy Prime Minister of New Zealand
- In role 10 September 1974 – 12 December 1975
- Preceded by: Irene Frances Watt
- Succeeded by: Patricia Talboys

Personal details
- Born: Catherine Anne Maclean; 4 April 1931 Auckland, New Zealand
- Died: 31 October 2021 (aged 90) Auckland, New Zealand
- Party: Labour
- Spouse: Bob Tizard (m. 1951; div. 1980)
- Children: 4; including Judith
- Education: University of Auckland

Dame Catherine Anne Tizard ONZ GCMG GCVO DBE QSO DStJ (née Maclean; 4 April 1931 – 31 October 2021) was a New Zealand politician who served as mayor of Auckland City from 1983 to 1990, and the 16th governor-general of New Zealand from 1990 to 1996. She was the first woman to hold either office.

== Personal life and early career ==
Catherine Anne Maclean was born in Auckland on 4 April 1931 to Scottish immigrants Neil and Helen Maclean, and grew up in Waharoa, near Matamata, Waikato. Her father worked at the local dairy factory. She attended Matamata College, gaining a University Bursary in her final year, 1948. In 1949 Catherine enrolled at Auckland University College, studying zoology.

While at university, she met Bob Tizard, then president of the Auckland University Students Association. On their second date, Bob told Catherine he was "going into politics. And I'm going to marry you." They married in 1951 and had four children; their daughter Judith is also a politician.

Between 1972 and 1975 Tizard's husband was a Cabinet Minister in the Third Labour Government, serving first as Minister of Health and later as Deputy Prime Minister and Minister of Finance. The family moved to Wellington, and Tizard commuted to Auckland for council business.

Tizard served on the committee of her local Playcentre and later became its president. She was also elected to the Board of Governors of the Eastern Suburbs Secondary Schools. In 1961 Tizard returned to university to complete her degree. She then taught and worked at the university from 1962 to 1983, during which time she co-authored at least two papers with Patricia Bergquist on sponges, and provided technical assistance as preparator for a third.

From 1976 to 1985 Tizard appeared on the popular TVNZ chat show Beauty and the Beast, along with Selwyn Toogood and Shona McFarlane. She later attributed her success in politics to this show.

== Political career ==
=== Auckland City Council ===
Tizard was elected to the Auckland City Council in 1971 and was re-elected in 1974, 1977, and 1980. She was also elected to the Auckland Regional Authority in 1980, simultaneously running for mayor of Auckland against the incumbent, Sir Dove-Myer Robinson, and councillor Colin Kay. This three-way split gave the election to Kay by a margin of 1,681 votes. Tizard opposed the 1981 Springbok tour, and an attempt to ban Hare Krishna from performing chants on Queen Street.

=== Mayor of Auckland City ===
Tizard decided to run for mayor of Auckland City again at the 1983 local elections, and won, defeating the incumbent Colin Kay. She was the first woman to serve as mayor of Auckland.

During Tizard's term as mayor, the Aotea Centre next to Aotea Square was developed. She was also the patron of the 99th Police recruit wing in 1985 in which all 75 recruits after graduation were sent to Auckland to serve. She was re-elected in 1986, and once again in 1989 following a major amalgamation of local authorities. In 1990 Auckland hosted the Commonwealth Games, an event Tizard had worked to secure for Auckland.

=== Governor-General ===
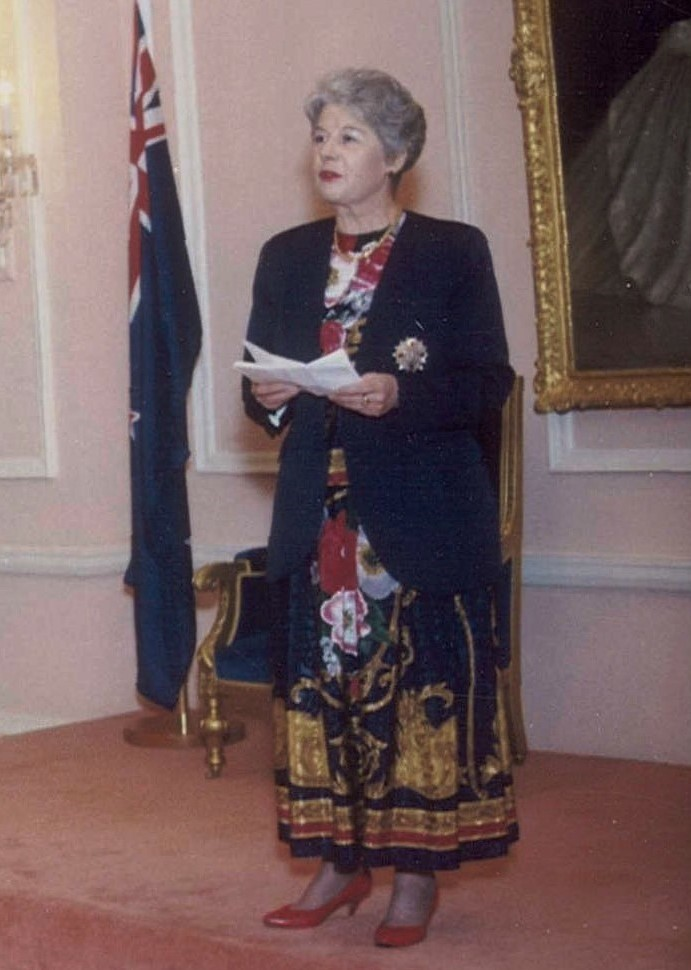
Tizard delivering a speech at an official function, 1992

In 1989 Tizard was appointed by Elizabeth II, Queen of New Zealand, as the nation's first female governor-general on the advice of Prime Minister Geoffrey Palmer. She took office on 13 December 1990, causing a by-election for the mayoralty of Auckland. She accepted on the proviso that the Queen be informed before her Royal tour in February 1990, and that the leader of the opposition be informed.

Then-Deputy Prime Minister Helen Clark and Labour Party President Margaret Wilson pushed for a female governor-general, as the 100th anniversary of women's suffrage in New Zealand would occur during the governor-general's term in 1993. Tizard had been informed of her impending appointment by her former husband Bob Tizard, who was a member of Cabinet at the time. She later commented that this was the only time Bob breached cabinet confidentiality. Tizard ended the practice of bowing to the governor-general, declaring, "No New Zealander should have to bow to another". She also ended the practice of members of staff ceasing to clean whenever she entered the room.

The 19th Governor-General of New Zealand, Sir Anand Satyanand, described how, when she was governor-general, she was not keen on a particular piece of legislation. After consideration and discussion with her official she finally said: "All right, I will sign my assent, but I will do it in black ink!" He said that a special bottle had to be obtained.

==== Controversies ====
Prior to the second referendum on electoral reform in New Zealand in June 1993 Tizard caused some outrage by making an unscripted suggestion in a lecture on the role of the governor-general that under mixed-member proportional representation the governor-general would have to use their reserve powers more often, which would create instability.

The 1993 New Zealand general election – the last under the "First Past the Post" electoral system – nearly resulted in a hung parliament, with the election night result having the two major parties tied. She asked Sir David Beattie to form a committee, along with three retired appeal court judges, to decide whom to appoint as prime minister. National won one more seat once special votes were counted, and was returned to power when Labour's Sir Peter Tapsell agreed to become Speaker of the New Zealand House of Representatives, thus ensuring National had a one-seat majority.

In an interview with North & South in 1996, Tizard stated that she could not believe "...some of the idiocies of the health system", causing great consternation from the Minister of Health.

== Retirement and late career ==
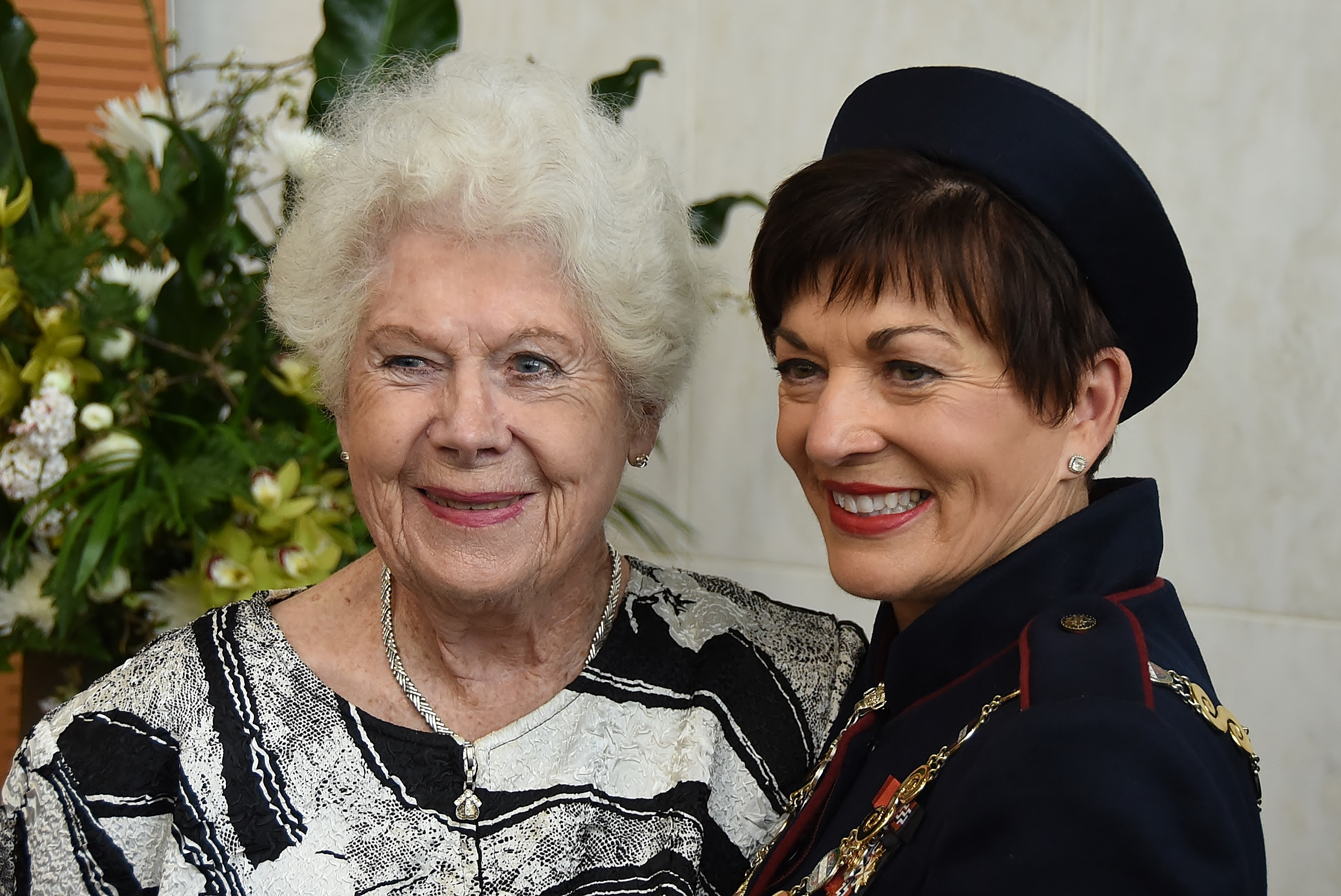
Tizard (left) in 2016, with Dame Patsy Reddy, after Reddy's swearing-in as governor-general

Upon Tizard's retirement from office, Sir Geoffrey Palmer, who had nominated her, stated: "She has been a powerful, yes a presidential public presence. She has been a part of New Zealand's growing up." In 2004 Tizard stated that she supported a New Zealand republic "in principle" and when she was governor-general, had discussed the issue of republicanism with the Queen: "She is quite sanguine about these things. She has always said it is a decision for New Zealand to make, and 'whatever decision New Zealand makes, of course we would accept it'."

In December 2004 Tizard became a member of the NZ Flag.com Trust, supporting a referendum on whether the New Zealand flag should be changed. She said, "Our present flag served a young post-colonial country well, but the time has come to consider a change which more appropriately recognises our changed identity and confidence in ourselves. Let's find out what the country thinks of the idea of a change." In 2007 Tizard supported former mayor of Auckland, Dick Hubbard's campaign for re-election as mayor at the local body elections.

In 2010 Tizard published her memoirs, entitled Cat Amongst the Pigeons, a reference to her personal arms. In December 2012 Tizard starred in an online video campaign supporting gay marriage, alongside New Zealand singers Anika Moa, Boh Runga, and Hollie Smith, as well as Olympian Danyon Loader.

== Death ==
Tizard died in Auckland, New Zealand on 31 October 2021, following a long illness. She was 90 years old.

== Honours and awards ==
In the 1985 New Year Honours, she was appointed a Dame Commander of the Order of the British Empire, for public and community service. In 1990 she received a New Zealand 1990 Commemoration Medal and was also made a Dame of Justice of the Order of St John and a Dame Grand Cross of the Order of St Michael and St George. In 1992, Tizard was awarded an Honorary Doctor of Law by the University of Auckland. In 1993, on the 100th anniversary of women's suffrage, Tizard received the New Zealand Suffrage Centennial Medal. In 1995 she was made a Dame Grand Cross of the Royal Victorian Order and in 1996 she was made an Additional Companion of the Queen’s Service Order.

In the 2002 Queen's Birthday and Golden Jubilee Honours, Tizard was appointed an Additional Member of the Order of New Zealand. On 9 October 2007 Tizard was appointed Honorary Colonel of the 3rd Auckland (Countess of Ranfurly's Own) and Northland Regiment, a largely ceremonial role. Changes to the rules of the use of titles in 2006 granted Tizard the use of the style The Honourable for life, as a consequence of having been governor-general.

== Arms ==
Coat of arms of Catherine Tizard
Notes The arms of Dame Catherine Tizard, granted on 9 December 1994 consist of: Crest Upon a helm with a wreath argent and azure within a circlet upon the rim eight New Zealand ferns (five manifest) argent a Cat a Mountain guardant sable holding in its foreclaws a "Kate Sheppard" Camellia slipped and leaved proper mantled azure doubled argent. Escutcheon (shown at left) Barry wavy argent and azure overall a lymphad oars in action the sail sable charged with a representation of the royal crown proper pennons gules between three escallops or. Supporters Two New Zealand Wood Pigeons wings elevated addorsed proper that on the dexter supporting with its interior foot a representation of the mace of the House of Representatives of New Zealand and that on the sinister likewise supporting with its interior foot a representation of the mace of the City of Auckland. Compartment All on a compartment comprising a grassy mount from which grow New Zealand fern and thistles all proper. Motto Floreat Feles Felix (May the happy cat flourish)

== See also ==
- List of elected and appointed female heads of state and government

Honorary titles
Preceded by Irene Frances Watt	Spouse of the Deputy Prime Minister of New Zealand; 1974–1975	Succeeded by Patricia Talboys
Political offices
Preceded by Colin Kay	Mayor of Auckland City; 1983–1990	Succeeded by Les Mills
Government offices
Preceded by Sir Paul Reeves	Governor-General of New Zealand; 1990–1996	Succeeded by Sir Michael Hardie Boys
