= 1980 Auckland City mayoral election =

- 11 October 1980
- Turnout: 33,299

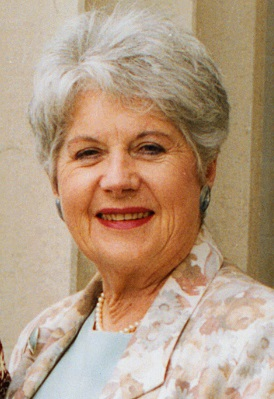

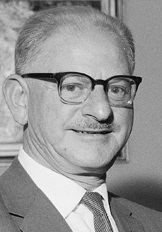
| Candidate | Colin Kay | Catherine Tizard | Dove-Myer Robinson |
| Party | Independent | Labour | Independent |
| Popular vote | 12,151 | 10,470 | 10,410 |
| Percentage | 36.49 | 31.44 | 31.26 |
Mayor before election
Dove-Myer Robinson
Elected mayor
Colin Kay

The 1980 Auckland City mayoral election was part of the New Zealand local elections held that same year. In 1980, elections were held for the Mayor of Auckland plus other local government positions including twenty-one city councillors. The polling was conducted using the standard first-past-the-post electoral method.

== Background ==
Long serving Mayor Dove-Myer Robinson reneged on his 1977 promise to retire in 1980 and stood for re-election. He was defeated by former Citizens & Ratepayers councillor Colin Kay, who stood as an independent.

== Mayoralty results ==
1980 Auckland mayoral election
| Party | Candidate | Votes | % | ±% |
|---|---|---|---|---|
| Independent | Colin Kay | 12,151 | 36.49 | +18.88 |
| Labour | Catherine Tizard | 10,470 | 31.44 | |
| Independent | Dove-Myer Robinson | 10,410 | 31.26 | −11.40 |
| Independent | Matthew Connor | 268 | 0.80 | +0.44 |
| Majority | | 1,681 | 5.04 | |
| Turnout | | 33,299 | | |

== Councillor results ==
1980 Auckland City Council election
| Party | Candidate | Votes | % | ±% |
|---|---|---|---|---|
| Citizens & Ratepayers | Jolyon Firth | 21,141 | 63.48 | +10.45 |
| Citizens & Ratepayers | Harold Goodman | 20,137 | 60.47 | +7.71 |
| Citizens & Ratepayers | Sue Picot | 19,647 | 59.00 | +4.06 |
| Citizens & Ratepayers | Norman Ambler | 18,880 | 56.69 | +1.31 |
| Labour | Catherine Tizard | 18,761 | 56.34 | +6.95 |
| Citizens & Ratepayers | John Strevens | 18,543 | 55.68 | +4.94 |
| Citizens & Ratepayers | Manahi Paewai | 18,192 | 54.63 | |
| Citizens & Ratepayers | Patricia Thorp | 17,074 | 51.27 | |
| Citizens & Ratepayers | Marie Quinn | 17,407 | 51.19 | |
| Citizens & Ratepayers | Clive Edwards | 16,965 | 50.94 | +1.40 |
| Citizens & Ratepayers | Sheila Horton | 16,950 | 50.90 | −3.78 |
| Citizens & Ratepayers | Michael Hart | 16,763 | 50.34 | |
| Citizens & Ratepayers | Gordon Barnaby | 15,811 | 47.48 | +0.62 |
| Citizens & Ratepayers | George Mulder | 15,474 | 46.46 | |
| Citizens & Ratepayers | Phil Warren | 14,919 | 44.80 | |
| Citizens & Ratepayers | Ian McKinnon | 14,754 | 44.30 | −5.47 |
| Citizens & Ratepayers | Bill Clark | 14,748 | 44.28 | +4.49 |
| Citizens & Ratepayers | Herb Dyer | 14,692 | 44.12 | −0.73 |
| Citizens & Ratepayers | Trevor Rogers | 14,420 | 43.30 | −1.63 |
| Citizens & Ratepayers | Olly Newland | 14,116 | 42.39 | |
| Citizens & Ratepayers | Bob Johnson | 14,036 | 42.15 | −0.34 |
| Citizens & Ratepayers | Maxwell Johnson | 13,640 | 40.96 | −3.67 |
| Labour | Richard Northey | 12,389 | 37.20 | +2.89 |
| Independent | Selwyn Daswon | 11,846 | 35.57 | −12.57 |
| Labour | Margaret Wilson | 11,314 | 33.97 | −2.23 |
| Labour | Jan Foote | 11,165 | 33.52 | |
| Labour | Suzanne Sinclair | 11,128 | 33.41 | |
| Labour | Glenda Fryer | 10,470 | 31.44 | −1.40 |
| Labour | Alex Dreaver | 9,964 | 29.92 | −6.79 |
| Labour | Tom Paki | 9,403 | 28.23 | |
| Labour | Lorraine Wilson | 9,249 | 27.77 | |
| Labour | Anne-Marie Cervin | 8,704 | 26.13 | |
| Labour | Maisie Fitton | 8,647 | 25.96 | |
| Labour | Brian Mason | 8,367 | 25.12 | |
| Labour | Mike Shone | 8,367 | 25.12 | |
| Labour | Peter Davis | 8,227 | 24.70 | |
| Labour | Deborah Smith | 7,649 | 22.97 | |
| Labour | Raine Simister | 7,606 | 22.84 | |
| Labour | Sofi Pua | 7,596 | 22.81 | −8.59 |
| Labour | Robyn Thompson | 7,549 | 22.67 | |
| Labour | Anne Tia | 7,473 | 22.44 | |
| Independent | Jack Brady | 7,436 | 22.33 | |
| Labour | John Antonio | 7,110 | 21.35 | |
| Independent | Gray Bartlett | 6,934 | 20.82 | |
| Independent | Patrick Hohepa | 6,910 | 20.75 | |
| Independent | Rex Boyens | 6,796 | 20.40 | |
| Independent | Neil Hyde | 6,530 | 19.61 | |
| Independent | Bradley Stanford | 6,188 | 18.58 | |
| Independent | Matthew Connor | 4,054 | 12.17 | −5.66 |
