= Ian Hassall =

New Zealand paediatrician (1941–2021)

Sir Ian Hassall KNZM
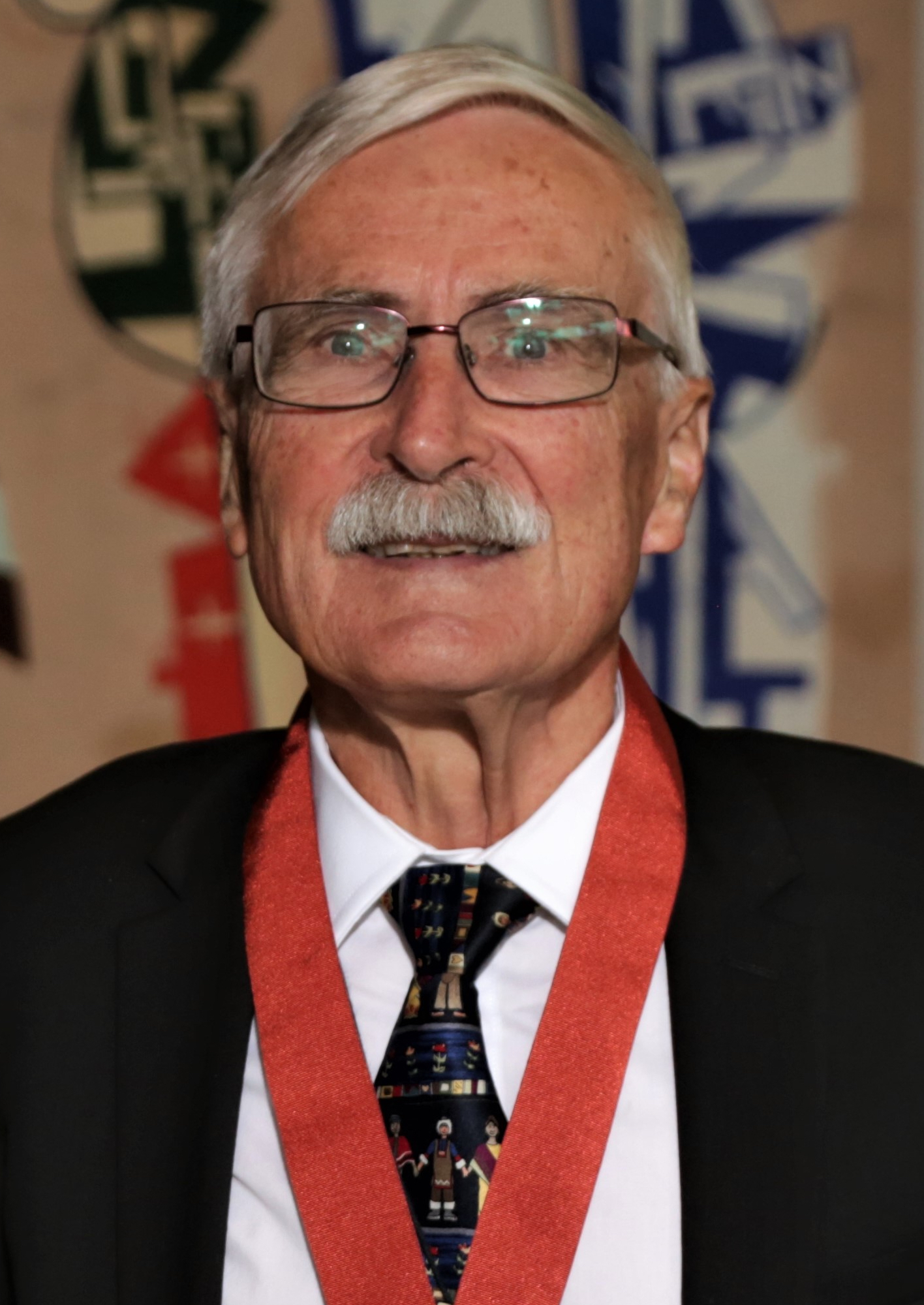
- Hassall in 2019
- Born: Ian Bruce Hassall; 10 August 1941; Arapuni, New Zealand
- Died: 14 June 2021 (aged 79)
- Occupation: Paediatrician

Sir Ian Bruce Hassall KNZM (10 August 1941 – 14 June 2021) was a New Zealand paediatrician and children's advocate. He was New Zealand's first Commissioner for Children from 1989 to 1994. His career entailed working for children and their families as clinician, strategist, researcher and advocate. He was awarded the Aldo Farina Award by UNICEF in 2010 for his dedication to improving child welfare.

Since 2002 he was Senior Researcher at the Institute of Public Policy (IPP) at AUT University in Auckland. With Emma Davies and Kirsten Hanna he undertook research and advocated for attitudes, processes and structures that advance children's interests. He was part of the Every Child Counts campaign to place children's interests at the centre of government. He taught the undergraduate paper, Children and Public Policy.

== Early life and family ==
Born at Arapuni on 10 August 1941, Hassall was educated at Mount Albert Grammar School in Auckland. He went on to study medicine at the University of Otago, graduating MB ChB in 1965, before earning specialist qualifications DCH (London) and FRACP (Auckland).

In 1966, Hassall married Jennifer Ann Millman, and the couple went on to have four children.

== Career ==
Hassall worked as a paediatrician at the Auckland, St Helens and Karitane Hospitals and at the Mangere Health Centre. He became interested in the health problems associated with disadvantage and in the increasingly evident problem of child maltreatment. In 1974 he was a founder of the Child Abuse Prevention Society (Parent Help) which publicised family violence and its prevention and set up a telephone helpline.

In 1978 Hassall was appointed Deputy Medical Director of the Plunket Society to help develop a project that brought a higher level of service and support to South Auckland, which was then widely seen as a disadvantaged area. Notable additional projects in which he took a leading role were, the 'Stamp Out Measles', 'Fencing of Swimming Pools' and 'Plunket-in-Neighbourhoods' campaigns. He was a member of the research team led by Professor Ed Mitchell which provided the first convincing evidence that prone lying was a major risk factor for Sudden Unexpected Death in Infancy (SUDI).

With David Geddis, Plunket's Medical Director, he was a member of the Ministerial Advisory Committee on the Prevention of Child Abuse and Neglect. They helped develop the 1989 Children, Young Persons and Their Families Act which adopted a radical, family-centred approach to the secondary prevention of child maltreatment. In 1989 Hassall was appointed Commissioner for Children. His five-year term saw the establishment of the role as an independent public advocate for children, based initially on the Norwegian model.

Following his term as Commissioner, Hassall continued in public and private roles as a children's advocate convening, with Robin Fancourt and Claire Hurst, the 12th International Congress in Auckland in 1998 of the International Society for the Prevention of Child Abuse and Neglect (ISPCAN). In 1998-99 he was international fellow at the Chapin Hall Center for Children, University of Chicago.

He was a co-founder, with Robin Fancourt, Judy Bailey and Dame Lesley Max, of the BrainWave Trust which lobbies policy-makers on behalf of children. With Jocelyn Cowern, Allan Barber and Andrew Davidson he co-founded the Kids Help Foundation Trust which operates the 'What's Up' national helpline for children and young people. He was chair of the child advocacy group, Children's Agenda. In 2001 Hassall began work with the Domestic Violence Centre (now Preventing Violence in the Home) as tutor and health sector manager and in 2002 he joined the Institute of Public Policy.

== Awards and honours ==
In the 2019 New Year Honours, Hassall was appointed a Knight Companion of the New Zealand Order of Merit, for services to the welfare of children.
