= 1990 New Zealand Labour Party leadership election =

New Zealand party leadership election

- 4 September 1990

56 New Zealand Labour Party members of the New Zealand Parliament 29 members needed to win
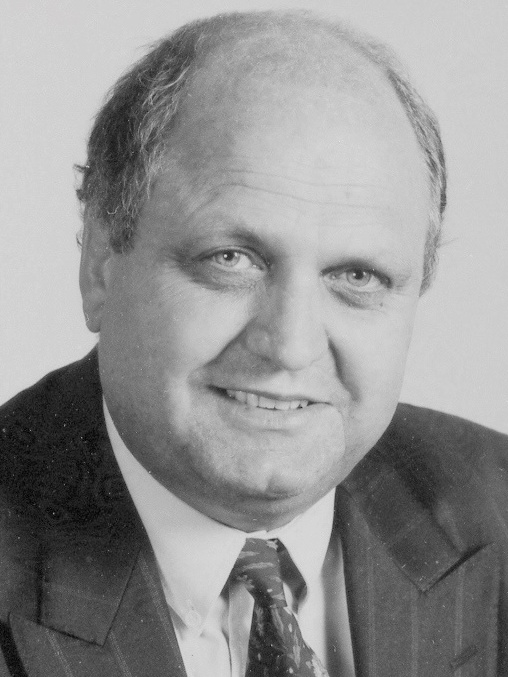

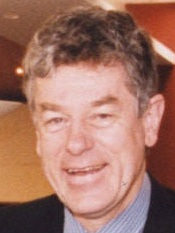
| Candidate | Mike Moore | Richard Northey |
| Leader's seat | Christchurch North | Eden |
| Popular vote | 41 | 15 |
| Percentage | 73.21% | 26.79% |
Leader before election
Geoffrey Palmer
Elected Leader
Mike Moore

The 1990 New Zealand Labour Party leadership election was held on 4 September to determine the leadership of the New Zealand Labour Party. The leadership was won by Christchurch North MP Mike Moore.

== Background ==
By 1990 the Labour Party had been torn apart by internal frictions between the supporters of Rogernomics (open market free trade policy) and those still favouring Labour's traditional protectionist fiscal policies. There had been two leadership challenges in the past 12 months with opponents of Rogernomics being successful. However Labour's popularity had fallen further still due to the increasing public outrage over the reforms. After seeing off a challenge from Roger Douglas in 1988, David Lange had resigned mid-1989 and replaced with Geoffrey Palmer who, while respected, was unpopular. Palmer was persuaded to step aside in favour of a more suitable candidate more capable of lessening the damage of what was already being predicted as a certain defeat for Labour.

== Candidates ==
=== Mike Moore ===
Moore was one of the senior cabinet ministers in the government and was ranked third in Labour's caucus. He was a supporter of the Rogernomics reforms, albeit less radical. As a result he was seen as a more acceptable alternative leader to both Douglas and his supporters as well as critics of Douglas. He had previously stood for the leadership in 1989 against Palmer but was defeated.

=== Richard Northey ===
Northey, an MP serving since 1984, was a surprise candidate to most. He was the sitting member for Eden and was not a member of cabinet. Many saw his candidature as merely token and he was viewed as a stalking horse like figure.

== Result ==
A caucus vote was held on 4 September 1990 in which Moore was successful. Helen Clark, Palmer's deputy leader retained her position despite the change in leaders.

=== Leadership ballot ===
1990 New Zealand Labour Party leadership election
| Candidate | Votes | % |
|---|---|---|
| Mike Moore | 41 | 73.21 |
| Richard Northey | 15 | 26.79 |
| Total | 56 | 100.00 |
| Mike Moore elected leader | | |

== Aftermath ==
Moore would lead Labour until he himself was defeated as leader in 1993 by his deputy Helen Clark. He served as prime minister for 8 weeks before going on to lose the next election in a landslide, and narrowly lose in 1993. Northey lost his seat in the 1990 election, but returned in 1993 only to be defeated again in 1996. Palmer later stated he had been prepared to lead the party to a likely defeat but was just as happy to step aside "I was actually pretty pleased to get out at the end of 1990. I was quite happy to run through as PM and take the defeat, but if other people wanted to do it — be my guest"!
