= 1986 Auckland City mayoral election =

New Zealand mayoral election

← 1983	11 October 1986	1989 →
- Turnout: 52,618
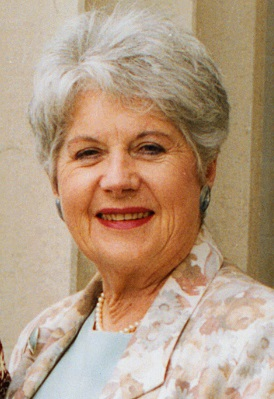

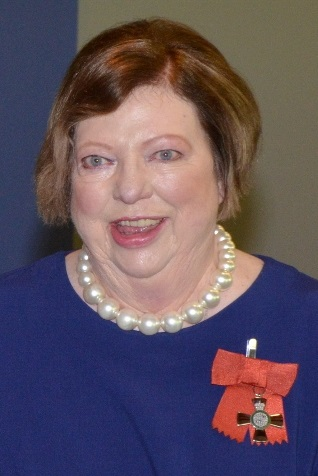
Candidate	Catherine Tizard	Marie Quinn
Party	Labour	Independent
Popular vote	32,390	20,228
Percentage	61.55	38.44
Mayor before election
Catherine Tizard
Elected mayor
Catherine Tizard

The 1986 Auckland City mayoral election was part of the New Zealand local elections held that same year. In 1986, elections were held for the Mayor of Auckland plus other local government positions including twenty-one city councillors. The polling was conducted using the standard first-past-the-post electoral method.

== Background ==
Incumbent Labour Party Mayor Catherine Tizard was re-elected for a second term with a substantial majority over former Citizens & Ratepayers councillor Marie Quinn, while the council saw a landslide result to the Citizens & Ratepayers ticket.

Electoral reforms were implemented at the 1986 municipal elections, the method of electing councillors at large which had been used for decades was replaced with a ward system of local electoral districts.

== Mayoralty results ==
The following table gives the election results:

1986 Auckland mayoral election
Party	Candidate	Votes	%	±%
Labour	Catherine Tizard	32,390	61.55	+27.18
Independent	Marie Quinn	20,228	38.44	
Majority		12,162	23.11	+13.88
Turnout		52,618		

== Ward results ==
Candidates were also elected from wards to the Auckland City Council.

Party/ticket	Councillors
Citizens & Ratepayers	15
Labour	5
Independent	1
