= Aussie Malcolm =

New Zealand politician (1940–2024)

The Honourable Aussie Malcolm

26th Minister of Health
- In office 11 December 1981 – 26 July 1984
- Prime Minister: Robert Muldoon
- Preceded by: George Gair
- Succeeded by: Michael Bassett

40th Minister of Immigration
- In office 12 February 1981 – 26 July 1984
- Prime Minister: Robert Muldoon
- Preceded by: Jim Bolger
- Succeeded by: Kerry Burke

Member of the New Zealand Parliament for Eden
- In office 29 November 1975 – 14 July 1984
- Preceded by: Mike Moore
- Succeeded by: Richard Northey

Personal details
- Born: Anthony George Malcolm; 11 December 1940 Melbourne, Victoria, Australia
- Died: 11 September 2024 (aged 83) Whangārei, New Zealand
- Party: National
- Spouse: Astrid Silver (m. 1965; died 2000)
- Children: 4
- Education: Victoria University of Wellington

Anthony George "Aussie" Malcolm (11 December 1940 – 11 September 2024) was a New Zealand National Party politician. He served three terms in parliament (1975–1984) and was a cabinet minister in Robert Muldoon's government. After politics, Malcolm became involved with the New Zealand team in the America's Cup campaign. Later, he formed what became the country's largest dive charter company.

== Early life ==
Malcolm was born in Melbourne, Australia, on 11 December 1940. He was educated in Canada and Australia (Sydney Church of England Grammar School), and then attended Wellington College and Victoria University of Wellington. He was the son of Joseph Anthony Malcolm, a New Zealand government official serving overseas. At school his classmates gave him the nickname "Aussie", which stuck with him the rest of his life.

Malcolm's early career was as a social worker with the Child Welfare Division of the Department of Education in Wellington and Palmerston North but by the mid-1970s he was owner of Malcolm & Hansard Ltd, an accredited advertising agency in Auckland.

== Member of Parliament ==
New Zealand Parliament
Years	Term	Electorate	Party
1975–1978	38th	Eden	National
1978–1981	39th	Eden	National
1981–1984	40th	Eden	National

Malcolm became the member of parliament for the Eden electorate in 1975, defeating Mike Moore, remaining there until he was in turn defeated in 1984 by Richard Northey.

=== Cabinet minister ===
Malcolm was a cabinet minister during the third term of the Muldoon National government, serving at various times as Associate Minister of Transport, Civil Aviation and Railways, Minister of Health, and Minister of Immigration.

==== Rail ====
As Associate to Colin McLachlan, Malcolm's focus was on New Zealand Railways. He managed the transition from government department to corporation, upgraded Wellington's commuter services with Hungarian built Ganz-Marvag electric units, electrified commuter services to Paraparaumu and commenced electrification of the main trunk line.

==== Immigration ====
Malcolm became involved with immigration as Parliamentary Under Secretary to Jim Bolger in 1977 and continued, as Minister, until 1984. Malcolm made use of his ministerial discretion to stop dawn raid deportations when children or other exceptional circumstances were involved. The Prime Minister Robert Muldoon publicly disagreed with Malcolm's decision to end legal action against Pacific visa overstayers and Malcolm twice attempted to resign, which Muldoon did not accept. Malcolm's attempts to resign caused Muldoon to publicly u-turn on the issue.

His response to the Vietnamese refugee crisis was the foundation for New Zealand refugee policies that persist to the present. Seven hundred refugees were taken in from Vietnam, then known as Indochina, by New Zealand. For both approaches, he received criticism from the political right. Later, by issuing visas to the 1981 Springboks, he received criticism from the political left. Malcolm was highly interventionist, making individual case decisions and instituting policies some regarded as "quirky" at the time, such as permitting restaurants to employ ethnic chefs, Chinese market gardeners to employ family members to replace their own children who were moving into the professions, the entry of skilled musicians and artists, and the first "entrepreneur" policy. After widespread review and submissions his new Immigration Bill was to undertake its second reading the night Muldoon announced the snap election in 1984. His legislation re-emerged later as the Labour-sponsored Immigration Act of 1987.

==== Tobacco ====
As the Minister of Health during the 1981–84 National government, Malcolm negotiated a voluntary agreement restricting tobacco advertising while a petition of 4,270 signatures calling for the abolition of cigarette advertising was being considered by Parliament.

== Later life ==
In 1984 Malcolm was involved in the KZ 7 campaign, joining the project as campaign director. The team finished second in the 1987 Louis Vuitton Cup. Malcolm later established Malcolm Pacific Limited, an immigration consultancy firm, where he was a director. He briefly considered re-entering politics, contemplating seeking the National Party nomination for the 1992 Tamaki by-election after Muldoon's resignation from parliament. He decided against it and supported Clem Simich, Muldoon's preferred successor.

In 1999 Malcolm and diving friend Jeroen Jongejans formed Dive! Tutukaka, New Zealand's largest dive charter company, operating at the Poor Knights Islands.

== Personal life and death ==
On 27 February 1965, Malcolm married Astrid Margaret Silver, the daughter of Frederick Brailsford Silver and Helga Adela Elisabeth Silver (née Henkel). Astrid Malcolm was elected to the Auckland City Council for the Mount Eden ward on the Citizens & Ratepayers ticket from 1989 to 1998. She died of a suspected embolism during a diving accident at the Poor Knights Islands in 2000. The couple had three daughters and one son. They also fostered numerous children from his retirement until his death.

Malcolm died on 11 September 2024. The following day, his family announced his death in Whangārei at the age of 83.

=== Sexual abuse allegations ===
Days after Malcolm's death, Stuff revealed that police were investigating claims that he had sexually abused children. Complaints against him were made to police in 1992 and 2012. Both complainants, who were boys under 16 at the time of the alleged abuse, had made statements about Malcolm to the Royal Commission of Inquiry into Abuse in Care, which prompted police to open a new investigation in July 2024. The investigation was ongoing at the time of his death. Police Commissioner Andrew Coster said that while a prosecution was no longer possible, police were interested to hear from other potential victims, and to "provide support". One of the alleged victims, now in his 50s, expressed a desire to see the investigation continue, comparing the situation to that of the Jimmy Savile sexual abuse scandal. Another called for those who had assisted Malcolm to be prosecuted.

In August 2025 a police investigation concluded that Malcolm likely abused multiple young boys, and that the cumulative evidence, if properly considered, could have supported prosecution.

== Honours and awards ==
In 1977, Malcolm was awarded the Queen Elizabeth II Silver Jubilee Medal, and in 1990 he received the New Zealand 1990 Commemoration Medal. On 31 August 1984, Malcolm was granted retention of the title "The Honourable", in recognition of his term as a member of the Executive Council.

== Notes ==
New Zealand Parliament
Preceded by Mike Moore	Member of Parliament for Eden; 1975–1984	Succeeded by Richard Northey
Political offices
Preceded by George Gair	Minister of Health; 1981–1984	Succeeded by Michael Bassett
Preceded by Jim Bolger	Minister of Immigration; 1981–1984	Succeeded by Kerry Burke
