= Duncan Rae =

New Zealand politician (1888–1964)

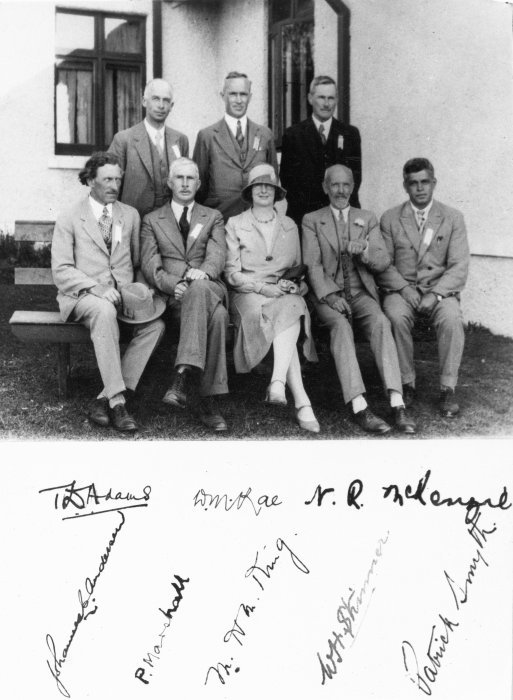
Rae (back row, centre) with other teachers in 1930

Duncan McFadyen Rae CMG (2 June 1888 – 3 February 1964) was a New Zealand politician of the National Party.

== Biography ==
New Zealand Parliament
Years	Term	Electorate	Party
1946–1949	28th	Parnell	National
1949–1951	29th	Parnell	National
1951–1954	30th	Parnell	National
1954–1957	31st	Eden	National
1957–1960	32nd	Eden	National

Rae was born in Mataura in 1888. He received his education at Knox College and at Otago University, where he gained an MA and a diploma of education. He was in the NZEF in World War I. He taught at East Cape School in Invercargill for ten years, and was then Vice-Principal (1924–1929) then Principal (1929–1947) at the Auckland Teachers' Training College.

Rae represented the Auckland electorates of Parnell from 1946 to 1954, and then Eden from 1954 (succeeding Wilfred Fortune) to 1960, when he retired. Rae suggested that an organisation for the protection of the country's heritage should be set up and put in a private member's bill in 1953. Whilst this did not proceed, the First National Government of New Zealand (of which he was a member) took responsibility of the issue and the Historic Places Act 1954 was passed, which established the National Historic Places Trust as a non-governmental organisation (NGO). This organisation has since evolved as an autonomous Crown entity known as Heritage New Zealand.

Rae was made Consul-General to Indonesia (1961–1963) then Chargé d'Affaires to Indonesia (1963).

In 1953, Rae was awarded the Queen Elizabeth II Coronation Medal. He was appointed a Companion of the Order of St Michael and St George in the 1963 New Year Honours. He died suddenly on 3 February 1964 in Auckland.

== Notes ==
New Zealand Parliament
Vacant Constituency recreated after abolition in 1938 Title last held by Bill Endean	Member of Parliament for Parnell; 1946–1954	Constituency abolished
Preceded by Wilfred Fortune	Member of Parliament for Eden; 1954–1960	Succeeded by John Rae
