= 1989 Auckland City mayoral election =

New Zealand mayoral election

← 1986	14 October 1989	1990 →
- Turnout: 83,268 (42.09%)
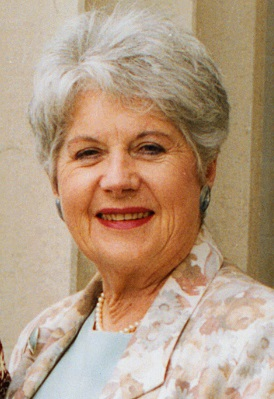

Candidate	Catherine Tizard	Malcolm Moses
Party	Labour	Independent
Popular vote	61,627	7,909
Percentage	74.01	9.49
Mayor before election
Catherine Tizard
Elected mayor
Catherine Tizard

The 1989 Auckland City mayoral election was part of the New Zealand local elections held that same year. In 1989, elections were held for the Mayor of Auckland plus other local government positions including twenty-four city councillors. The polling was conducted using the standard first-past-the-post electoral method.

== Background ==
The 1989 local elections were the first following a major overhaul of local government in New Zealand. The existing Auckland City Council remained in place but greatly expanded, absorbing several surrounding borough councils. Incumbent Mayor Catherine Tizard, a Labour Party backed candidate, was re-elected with a huge majority while the council saw a strong performance by the Citizens & Ratepayers ticket.

== Mayoralty results ==
The following table gives the election results:

1989 Auckland mayoral election
Party	Candidate	Votes	%	±%
Labour	Catherine Tizard	61,627	74.01	+12.46
Independent	Malcolm Moses	7,909	9.49	
Independent	Dan Watson	4,462	5.35	
Green	Jack Conran	4,257	5.11	
Independent	Laurence Watkins	1,949	2.34	
Blokes Liberation Front	Chris Brady	1,794	2.15	
McGillicuddy Serious	Mark Servian	1,270	1.52	
Majority		53,718	64.51	+41.40
Turnout		83,268	42.09	

== Ward results ==
Candidates were also elected from wards to the Auckland City Council.

Party/ticket	Councillors
Citizens & Ratepayers	17
Labour	3
Independent	3
Community Independent	1
