= Phil Warren (promoter) =

New Zealand music promoter and politician

Phil Warren QSO JP
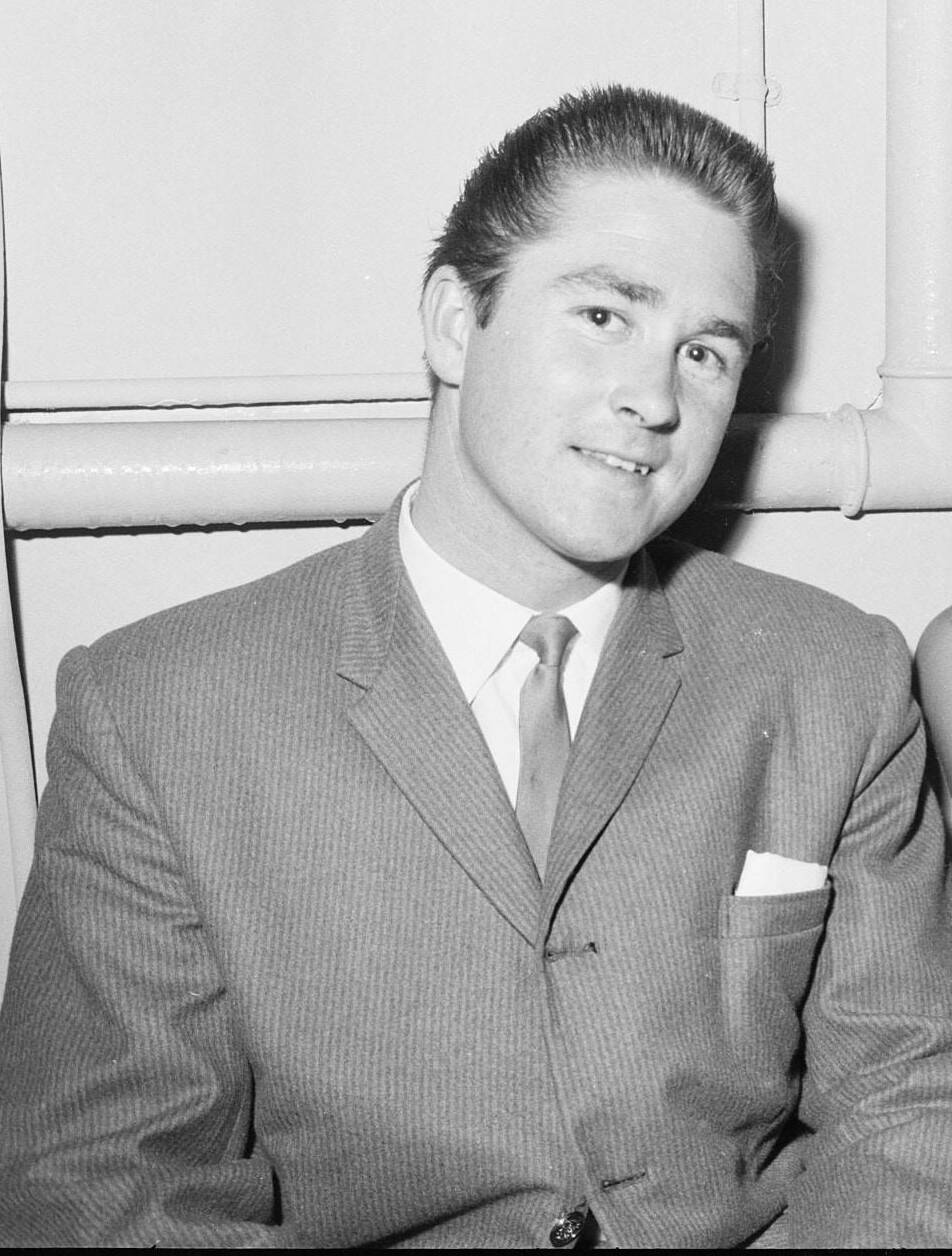
- Warren at the Crystal Palace Ballroom in 1960

20th Deputy Mayor of Auckland
- In office 2 September 1988 – 14 February 1991
- Mayor: Catherine Tizard; Les Mills
- Preceded by: Harold Goodman
- Succeeded by: David Hay

Personal details
- Born: 12 March 1938 Auckland, New Zealand
- Died: 23 January 2002 (aged 63) Auckland, New Zealand
- Spouse: Pat Warren
- Children: 2
- Profession: Promoter

Philip Reece Warren QSO JP (12 March 1938 – 23 January 2002) was a New Zealand music promoter, manager, agent and later a politician.

== Background ==
He came from Kingsland, an Auckland suburb, and went to Mount Albert Grammar School. He was the father of two children and was married to Pat Warren who died in 2000.

== Music and career as an entertainment promoter ==
In 1955, he was a drummer playing part-time. He also started work at Begg's Music Store that year. In 1956 at the age of 17, he also formed Prestige Records which was used to distribute independent material from overseas labels. In 1958, he signed up Johnny Devlin and recorded him.

He purchased the Fuller's Entertainment Bureau from founder Mary Throll in the mid-1960s. Under his control, it became one of the biggest management and booking agencies in New Zealand. He had Ray Columbus and Lew Pryme working for him, managing Fuller's. At the time, the Fuller's roster included Sandy Edmonds, The Keil Isles, The Chicks, The Rumour, and Shane. One of the artists he would book regularly was Tahitian singer, George Tumahai.

Warren promoted and funded Redwood 70, the first modern New Zealand multi-day music festival. Held in Swanson, West Auckland, New Zealand, the festival resulted in a loss, but had a major impact on the music scene in the country, influencing future festivals held later in the 1970s.

In early 1972, a syndicate headed by Lew Pryme and Glen Tabuteau purchased Fuller's Entertainment Bureau from Warren. In late 1972, Warren spotted singer Andy Waretini on the New faces contest, and later booked him for the summer period to appear at selected holiday centres with David Whitfield, an entertainer from the UK.

In May 1974, he engaged The Bulldogs All Star Goodtime Band as a supporting act for Daniel Boone and the Dillinger Show band on their New Zealand tour.

In 1975 he was presented the Benny Award from the Variety Artists Club of New Zealand for his contribution to New Zealand entertainment. He was presented a Scroll of Honour and made a Life Member of the VAC in 1995 and 1996 respectively.

== Record labels ==
In 1959 Phil Warren started up the Top Rank Records label. He was a 50% shareholder and the other 50% was split between the cinema chain Kerridge-Odeon and the Rank Organisation, a UK company. Due to some issues with Warner Brothers, the label changed its name to Allied International in 1960. In 1961 the conglomerate of Warren, Kerridge and Top Rank sold the company to G.A. Wooller & Co. Ltd to the record division of Pye (NZ) Limited which was G.A. Wooller & Co. Ltd.

== Political career ==
In a 1979 by-election he stood as an independent for the Auckland City Council, placing fourth. He stood again at the 1980 local elections on the Citizens & Ratepayers (C&R) ticket and was successful. In 1988 he was appointed deputy mayor of Auckland following the death of Harold Goodman. Following mayor Catherine Tizard's resignation in 1990, Warren contested the subsequent by-election for the mayoralty. He was initially the favourite and lead in opinion polls, but surprisingly finished a distant sixth. Following his failed mayoral bid he declined to stand again for the C&R caucus leadership, with media speculating this was because Warren was intending to stand for mayor again at the 1992 local elections. He was succeeded by David Hay as C&R leader and subsequently deputy mayor.

In later years he was Chairman of the Auckland Regional Council.

In the 1994 Queen's Birthday Honours, Warren was appointed a Companion of the Queen's Service Order for public services.

== Death ==
On 23 January 2002, he died of a heart attack at age 63.

Political offices
Preceded by Harold Goodman	Deputy Mayor of Auckland; 1988–1991	Succeeded by David Hay
Preceded by Colin Kay	Chair of the Auckland Regional Council; 1992–2002	Succeeded by Gwen Bull
