= Wilfred Fortune =

New Zealand politician

The Honourable Wilfred Fortune
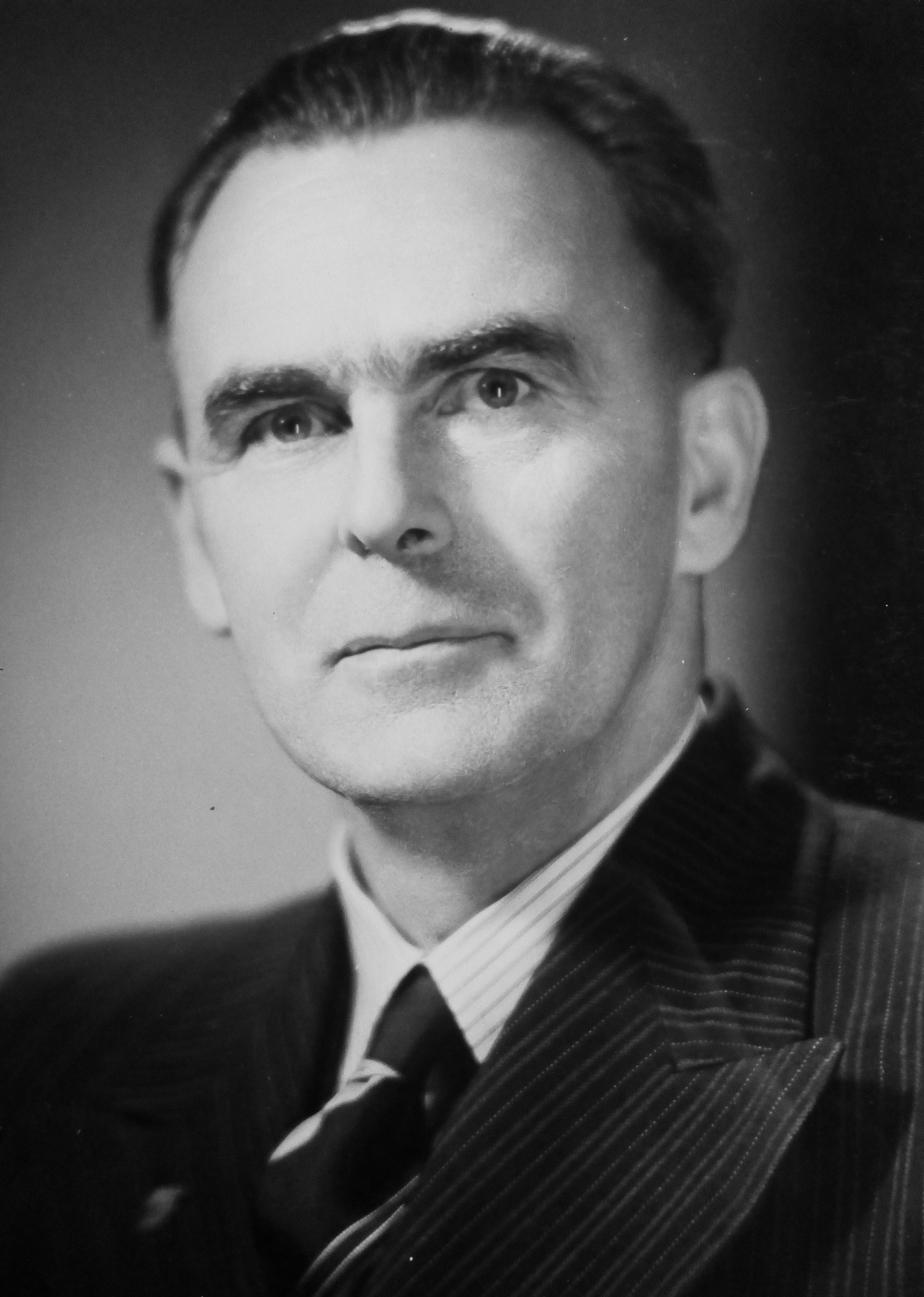

Member of the New Zealand Parliament for Eden
- In office 27 November 1946 – 13 November 1954
- Preceded by: Bill Anderton
- Succeeded by: Duncan Rae

Personal details
- Born: 9 October 1897 Paeroa, New Zealand
- Died: 28 February 1961 (aged 63) Auckland, New Zealand
- Party: National
- Education: University of Auckland

Military service
- Allegiance: New Zealand Army
- Rank: Lieutenant Colonel
- Battles/wars: World War II

Wilfred Henry Fortune (9 October 1897 – 28 February 1961) was a New Zealand politician of the National Party.

== Personal life ==
Fortune was born in 1897 in Paeroa. He received his education at Auckland Grammar School, the Auckland Teachers' Training College, and the University of Auckland. He obtained a B.A., a B.Com., and a diploma in social sciences. He initially worked as a teacher, then became a public secretary, and was then managing director of Young and Fortune Ltd. During World War II, he was a lieutenant colonel with the New Zealand Expeditionary Force (NZEF) in the Pacific. Fortune died on 28 February 1961.

== Political career ==
New Zealand Parliament
Years	Term	Electorate	Party
1946–1949	28th	Eden	National
1949–1951	29th	Eden	National
1951–1954	30th	Eden	National

As an Independent, he contested the 1940 by-election in the Auckland West electorate resulting from Michael Joseph Savage's death, but was beaten by Labour's Peter Carr. He stood for National in the 1943 election, but was beaten by the incumbent, Labour's Bill Anderton, by only 14 votes. In 1941 he won a seat on the Auckland City Council, serving two terms.

=== Member of parliament ===
Fortune was first elected to parliament at the subsequent election in 1946, when Anderton successfully stood in Auckland Central, and Fortune was returned in Eden. Fortune held Eden until the 1954 election, when he was defeated for Onslow. He was a member of the Executive Council from 1949 to 1954 in the First National Government. In January 1950 he was appointed Minister of Police.

In 1953, Fortune was awarded the Queen Elizabeth II Coronation Medal. In 1955, he was granted the use of the title of "Honourable" for life, having served more than three years as a member of the Executive Council.

=== After parliament ===
From 1956 until his death, he chaired the National Party in Auckland. In 1957 he won a by-election to regain a seat on the Auckland City Council. His interests lay in education and health, and he was a member of the Auckland Education Board, and the Seddon Memorial Technical College Board of Governors. He was a director of the YMCA, and chaired the Auckland Central Health Camp Council.

== Notes ==
Political offices
Preceded by Sidney Holland	Minister of Police; 1950–1954	Succeeded by Sidney Holland
New Zealand Parliament
Preceded by Bill Anderton	Member of Parliament for Eden; 1946–1954	Succeeded by Duncan Rae
