= Margaret Wilson =

New Zealand politician (born 1947)

The Honourable Margaret Wilson DCNZM
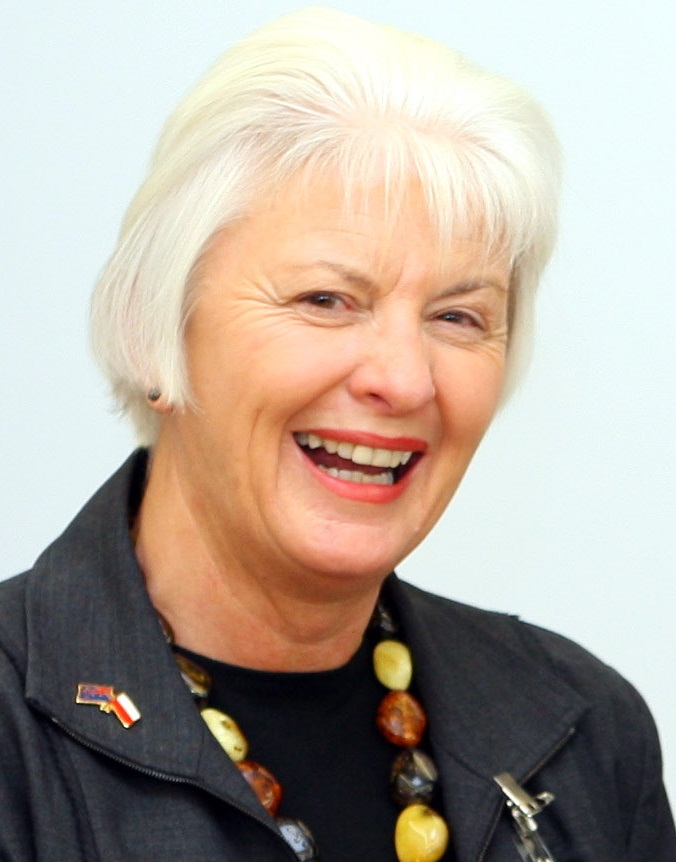
- Wilson in 2008

27th Speaker of the House of Representatives
- In office 3 March 2005 – 8 December 2008
- Prime Minister: Helen Clark; John Key
- Preceded by: Jonathan Hunt
- Succeeded by: Lockwood Smith

7th Minister of Commerce
- In office 21 February 2004 – 21 December 2004
- Prime Minister: Helen Clark
- Preceded by: Lianne Dalziel
- Succeeded by: Pete Hodgson

30th Attorney-General
- In office 10 December 1999 – 28 February 2005
- Prime Minister: Helen Clark
- Preceded by: Doug Graham
- Succeeded by: Michael Cullen

7th Minister of Labour
- In office 10 December 1999 – 26 February 2004
- Prime Minister: Helen Clark
- Preceded by: Max Bradford
- Succeeded by: Paul Swain

Member of the New Zealand Parliament for Labour Party list
- In office 27 November 1999 – 3 October 2008

26th President of the Labour Party
- In office 8 September 1984 – 9 November 1987
- Vice President: Stu McCaffley
- Preceded by: Jim Anderton
- Succeeded by: Rex Jones

Personal details
- Born: Margaret Anne Wilson; 20 May 1947 (age 79) Gisborne, New Zealand
- Party: Labour
- Profession: Academic

Margaret Anne Wilson DCNZM (born 20 May 1947) is a New Zealand lawyer, academic and former Labour Party politician. She served as Attorney-General from 1999 to 2005 and Speaker of the House of Representatives from 2005 to 2008, during the Fifth Labour Government.

== Early life and career ==
Born in Gisborne, Wilson was raised in Morrinsville where her parents Bill and Patricia (Paddy) ran a small store. She was the eldest of four children. As a seven-year-old, she spent several months living in Auckland with her great-aunt and great-uncle after her father had a nervous breakdown. Wilson's family were Catholic and Labour-voting; Bill's father's cousin was the Labor Party Premier of New South Wales, Bob Heffron.

Wilson returned to Auckland to receive secondary education at St Dominic's College, and completed her final year as the only female student at Morrinsville College. She had a leg amputated due to cancer at the age of 16, which cut short her plans to be a physical education teacher. Instead, she studied law and graduated LLB(Honours) from the University of Auckland in 1970. Briefly, she worked as a law clerk and solicitor in Auckland from 1970 to 1972 (in 1971 she was secretary of the legal employees' union), before a master's in jurisprudence on workers' participation in management in New Zealand was completed in 1974. In her memoir, Wilson reports that only seven in her undergraduate class of 200 were women; her female classmates included future Chief Justice of New Zealand Sian Elias and future judge of the Hong Kong Court of First Instance Clare-Marie Beeson. Future members of Parliament David Lange and Jim McLay were also in the cohort. Wilson began lecturing in the University of Auckland law faculty in 1972 and continued in lecturing roles until 1990 (latterly in a part-time capacity as she became more politically active).

Wilson campaigned for Eddie Isbey, the Labour Party candidate in Grey Lynn, in 1969 and 1972. In 1975, she spent a year studying for a doctorate at Osgoode Hall Law School in Toronto, Ontario, which she did not complete. Before her overseas studies, Wilson had begun to campaign for women's rights; she returned to these aims in 1976 and joined the Labour Party as a means to those ends. She stood unsuccessfully for the Auckland City Council on a Labour Party ticket in both 1977 and 1980. In her memoir, Wilson reflected that future Prime Minister and her then-University of Auckland colleague Helen Clark encouraged her candidacy.

In the 1980s, Wilson was a senior figure in the extra-parliamentary Labour Party. She was elected as a women's representative on the Labour Party Council for two one-year terms in 1980 and 1981 and to the vice-presidency in 1982. From 1984 to 1987, she was president of the Labour Party, the first woman to do so. She contributed to the party's manifesto commitments on women's equality, which included the establishment of the Ministry for Women's Affairs, for the 1984 general election. It was suggested that Wilson stand for Parliament in 1987; she declined. Following her term as Labour president, she chaired the government's working group on equal employment opportunities and equal pay, served on the Law Commission, and was appointed as a director of the Reserve Bank. Between 1989 and 1990, she worked as chief political advisor to the Prime Minister, Geoffrey Palmer.

Wilson established the University of Waikato School of Law as New Zealand's fifth law school in 1990. She was its first Professor of law and founding Dean until 1999 when she became a Member of Parliament. Wilson was the first female Dean of a law school in New Zealand.

In 1993, Wilson was awarded the New Zealand Suffrage Centennial Medal.

== Member of Parliament ==
New Zealand Parliament
Years	Term	Electorate	List	Party
1999–2002	46th	List	9	Labour
2002–2005	47th	List	9	Labour
2005–2008	48th	List	3	Labour

After nine years of a National-led Government, including three years of testing coalition arrangements, Labour anticipated forming a government after the 1999 election. Wilson's former Auckland University colleague Helen Clark, now leader of the Labour Party, invited Wilson to stand for election on the Labour Party list, with a view to being the Attorney-General should Labour successfully form a new government. Wilson agreed and also stood for election in the Tauranga electorate, displacing Labour's expected candidate, union organiser and former Tauranga Labour electorate committee chairman Terry Hughes. She placed third behind New Zealand First leader Winston Peters and National candidate Katherine O'Regan in a close race. Wilson sought a judicial recount as since New Zealand First won less than five percent of the party vote they would have no seats in parliament in at all if Peters lost the electorate (allowing Labour to govern solely with the Alliance and not needing the Greens). Peters criticised the recount as a waste of money. The recount resulted in Peters' majority increasing by one vote from 62 to 63.

As the ninth candidate on the Labour list, Wilson entered Parliament as a list MP and immediately gained election to the Cabinet. In addition to being appointed Attorney-General, she was additionally made Minister of Labour, Minister in charge of Treaty of Waitangi Negotiations, and associate minister for justice and state services. In the justice portfolio, she had delegated responsibility for constitutional and electoral policy, human rights, privacy and the Māori–Crown relationship.

Across her portfolios, Wilson had a strong focus on women's equality. She established the position of Equal Employment Opportunities commissioner at the Human Rights Commission and progressed reform to matrimonial property law. She also oversaw the replacement of the Employment Contracts Act 1991 with the Employment Relations Act 2000 and, as Attorney-General, revived and completed previous governments' attempts to cease using the Privy Council as the New Zealand's court of last resort and establish an independent Supreme Court of New Zealand.

Wilson remained a list MP after the 2002 election and, over the term, gained a more varied set of portfolios. She initially continued as Attorney-General, Minister of Labour, Minister in charge of Treaty of Waitangi Negotiations and Associate Minister of Justice. She was Minister for Courts until May 2003, until that role was reassigned to Rick Barker with Wilson as the associate minister. In February 2004, Wilson became Minister of Commerce (Paul Swain picked up the labour portfolio) and in November 2004, Wilson became the first Minister for Building Issues.

=== Speaker of the House ===
In December 2004, the Government announced that it would nominate Wilson for the post of Speaker of the House of Representatives, a position which would become vacant with the pending retirement of Jonathan Hunt. Previous speculation had focused on Mark Burton, the Minister of Defence. In her memoir, Wilson recalled advising Prime Minister Helen Clark toward the end of 2004 that she could not see herself doing a third term as a minister and that she intended to retire at the 2005 election. Clark suggested that Wilson consider the speakership instead.

On 3 March 2005, Parliament elected Wilson as its new speaker over candidacies by Clem Simich from the New Zealand National Party and Ken Shirley from the ACT Party. Wilson became New Zealand's first female speaker. After the 2005 election, she was re-elected to the position unopposed.

On 21 June 2005, Wilson ejected the Prime Minister Helen Clark from Parliament's Chamber for interjecting while National's Nick Smith was speaking.

Her style was noticeably different from her predecessor. In July 2006, National attempted a vote of no confidence in Wilson, after she refused to send a report on Labour MP Taito Phillip Field to the Privileges Committee, but Labour blocked the move. The most serious challenge to her authority as speaker came on 26 August 2008, when Act leader Rodney Hide initially refused her order to leave the debating chamber, saying, "I actually won't go now, Madam Speaker." She told him to "think carefully", but did not apply to have Hide named after he left. Wilson oversaw the launch of Parliament TV in July 2007.

Wilson announced in February 2008 that she would not be standing for re-election in 2008, and was considering academia rather than a diplomatic posting. She finished her role by closing the 48th Parliament.

In the 2009 New Year Honours, Wilson was appointed a Distinguished Companion of the New Zealand Order of Merit, in recognition of her services as a Member of Parliament and as Speaker. Following the restoration of titular honours by the New Zealand government later in 2009, Wilson declined re-designation as a Dame Companion.

== Political views ==
Wilson strongly promotes various social causes such as feminism and multiculturalism, and opponents often painted her as Labour's most "politically correct" minister. She was the Minister responsible for the introduction of the new Supreme Court, which was controversial at the time, as well as changing the law on dividing property between partners after a separation, known now as relationship property law.

Wilson, alongside Helen Kelly, were noted opponents of neoliberalism and tried to support the union movement whilst in Government. However, Wilson acknowledged that the Labour Relations Act 1987 was a "an awkward compromise" between neoliberal economic values, and the rights of organised labour.

== Return to academia ==
After leaving Parliament, she resumed her academic career at the Waikato University law school, being appointed Professor of Law and Public Policy (2009). In September 2020 she was awarded the title of Emeritus Professor by the University of Waikato.

Wilson published her memoir Activism, Feminism, Politics and Parliament in 2021.

== Publications ==
=== Author ===
- Wilson, Margaret (1989). Labour in Government, 1984-1987. Allen & Unwin Australia. ISBN 978-0-04-641049-0.
- Wilson, Margaret (2015). The Struggle for Sovereignty. Wellington: Bridget Williams Books. ISBN 978-0-908321-20-9.
- Margaret, Wilson (2021). Activism Feminism Politics And Parliament. Wellington, New Zealand: Bridget Williams Books. ISBN 978-1-988587-84-4. OCLC 1253316004.

=== Co-editor ===
- Wilson, Margaret; Yeatman, Anna (1995). Justice and Identity: Antipodean Practices. Wellington: Bridget Williams Books. ISBN 0-908912-60-9.
- McGregor, Judy; Wilson, Margaret Anne; Bell, Sylvia A. (2016). Human Rights in New Zealand. ISBN 978-0-947492-74-8.

=== Contributor ===
- Wilson, Margaret (1986). "Working for Change". In Clark, Margaret (ed.). Beyond Expectations. Wellington: Bridget Williams Books. pp. 155–166. ISBN 978-0-86861-650-6.
- Wilson, Margaret (2017). "The Politics of Workplace Reform: 40 Years of Change". In Anderson, Gordon (ed.). Transforming Workplace Relations. Wellington: Victoria University Press. pp. 44–59. ISBN 978-1-77656-173-5.
- Wilson, Margaret (2025). "The Role of Political Parties in New Zealand's Democracy". The Futures of Democracy, Law and Government. Wellington: Te Herenga Waka University Press. ISBN 9781776921195.

Political offices
Preceded by Doug Graham	Attorney-General; 1999–2005	Succeeded by Michael Cullen
Preceded by Lianne Dalziel	Minister of Commerce; 2004	Succeeded by Pete Hodgson
New Zealand Parliament
Preceded by Jonathan Hunt	Speaker of the House; 2005–2008	Succeeded by Lockwood Smith
Party political offices
Preceded by Jim Anderton	President of the Labour Party; 1984–1987	Succeeded by Rex Jones
