= Eden (New Zealand electorate) =

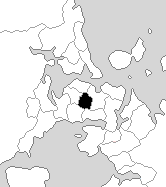
Eden electorate boundaries between 1993 and 1996

Eden, a former New Zealand parliamentary electorate, lay in the general area of the suburb of Mount Eden in the city of Auckland.

== Population centres ==
The 1870 electoral redistribution was undertaken by a parliamentary select committee based on population data from the 1867 census. Eight sub-committees were formed, with two members each making decisions for their own province; thus members set their own electorate boundaries. The number of electorates was increased from 61 to 72, and Eden was one of the new electorates.

The electorate was urban, and comprised a number of inner-city suburbs in the central-south part of Auckland.

== History ==
The Eden electorate was created in 1871 for the 5th Parliament. The first elected representative was Robert James Creighton, who won the 1871 election. He was succeeded in 1876 by Joseph Tole, who served until 1887. In the 1879 election, Tole beat Frederick Whitaker. Edwin Mitchelson won the 1887 election. He served three parliamentary terms until 1896, when he unsuccessfully contested the City of Auckland electorate.

John Bollard was the next representative, elected in the 1896 election. He held the electorate until 1914. In the 1899 election, he had a wafer-thin majority of just four votes over Malcolm Niccol. Bollard was succeeded by James Parr, who won the 1914 election. Parr resigned on 26 March 1926, as he had been appointed as High Commissioner to the United Kingdom.

Rex Mason won the resulting 1926 by-election, as the Reform Party vote was split between two candidates. He held the electorate for the remainder of the term until 1928. He was succeeded by Arthur Stallworthy, who won in the 1928 election. He was defeated in 1935 by Bill Anderton, who held Eden until 1946, when he was elected for Auckland Central. Wilfred Fortune won Eden in 1946 and held the electorate for three terms until 1954, when he was defeated for the Onslow electorate.

Premier and Attorney-General Frederick Whitaker stood unsuccessfully for Eden in 1879; as did John Kerr in 1871.

The electorate was abolished in 1996, when it was replaced by the new MMP electorate of Epsom.

=== Members of Parliament ===
Eden was represented by 15 Members of Parliament.

Key

Independent Conservative Reform Labour United National

Election	Winner
1871 election	Robert Creighton
1876 election	Joseph Tole
1879 election	Joseph Tole
1881 election	Joseph Tole
1884 election	Joseph Tole
1887 election	Edwin Mitchelson
1890 election	Edwin Mitchelson
1893 election	Edwin Mitchelson
1896 election	John Bollard
1899 election	John Bollard
1902 election	John Bollard
1905 election	John Bollard
1908 election	John Bollard
1911 election	John Bollard
1914 election	James Parr
1919 election	James Parr
1922 election	James Parr
1925 election	James Parr
1926 by-election	Rex Mason
1928 election	Arthur Stallworthy
1931 election	Arthur Stallworthy
1935 election	Bill Anderton
1938 election	Bill Anderton
1943 election	Bill Anderton
1946 election	Wilfred Fortune
1949 election	Wilfred Fortune
1951 election	Wilfred Fortune
1954 election	Duncan Rae
1957 election	Duncan Rae
1960 election	John Rae
1963 election	John Rae
1966 election	John Rae
1969 election	John Rae
1972 election	Mike Moore
1975 election	Aussie Malcolm
1978 election	Aussie Malcolm
1981 election	Aussie Malcolm
1984 election	Richard Northey
1987 election	Richard Northey
1990 election	Christine Fletcher
1993 election	Christine Fletcher
(Electorate abolished in 1996; see Epsom)

== Election results ==
=== 1993 election ===
1993 general election: Eden
Party	Candidate	Votes	%	±%
National	Christine Fletcher	10,121	49.38	+3.34
Labour	Verna Smith	6,727	32.82	
Alliance	Keith Locke	2,878	14.04	+10.51
Christian Heritage	Ewen McQueen	375	1.82	
McGillicuddy Serious	Aidrian Bridgeman-Sutton	164	0.80	+0.18
Independent	Julie Halligan	82	0.40	
Defence Movement	Michael Bowden	76	0.37	
Natural Law	John Hodgson	70	0.34	
Majority		3,394	16.56	+8.87
Turnout		20,493	84.73	−1.65
Registered electors		24,184		

=== 1990 election ===
1990 general election: Eden
Party	Candidate	Votes	%	±%
National	Christine Fletcher	9,117	46.04	
Labour	Richard Northey	7,593	38.35	−18.49
Green	Robyn Dormer	1,814	9.16	
NewLabour	Keith Locke	700	3.53	
Democrats	Mary Tierney	293	1.47	
McGillicuddy Serious	Aidrian Bridgeman-Sutton	124	0.62	
NZ Party	Stephen Greenfield	116	0.58	
Independent	W Littlewood	42	0.21	
Majority		1,524	7.69	
Turnout		19,799	86.38	−3.12
Registered electors		22,919		

=== 1987 election ===
1987 general election: Eden
Party	Candidate	Votes	%	±%
Labour	Richard Northey	11,916	56.84	+8.28
National	Hiwi Tauroa	8,512	40.60	
Democrats	Arthur Drabble	380	1.81	
NZ Party	Blanche Victoria Holloway	153	0.72	
Majority		3,404	16.23	+6.15
Turnout		20,961	89.50	−4.19
Registered electors		23,419		

=== 1984 election ===
1984 general election: Eden
Party	Candidate	Votes	%	±%
Labour	Richard Northey	11,106	48.56	
National	Aussie Malcolm	8,800	38.43	−3.36
NZ Party	Richard Cullen	2,294	10.03	
Social Credit	Ken Harris	571	2.49	
Values	Sylvia Williams	96	0.41	
Majority		2,306	10.08	
Turnout		22,867	93.69	+5.53
Registered electors		24,406		

=== 1981 election ===
1981 general election: Eden
Party	Candidate	Votes	%	±%
National	Aussie Malcolm	8,526	41.79	−1.47
Labour	Ian Scott	8,409	41.22	
Social Credit	Allan Scott	3,303	16.19	
Values	Rosa Tyson	162	0.79	
Majority		117	0.57	−2.67
Turnout		20,400	88.16	+32.44
Registered electors		23,138		

=== 1978 election ===
1978 general election: Eden
Party	Candidate	Votes	%	±%
National	Aussie Malcolm	8,653	43.26	−6.22
Labour	John Hinchcliff	8,005	40.02	
Social Credit	Les Tasker	1,836	9.18	+6.66
Values	Margaret Crozier	877	4.38	
Independent National	Max Louis Peers	525	2.62	
Independent Labour	Barry Moss	53	0.26	
Cheer Up	Vince Terreni	49	0.24	
Majority		648	3.24	−3.53
Turnout		19,998	55.72	−18.18
Registered electors		35,888		

=== 1975 election ===
1975 general election: Eden
Party	Candidate	Votes	%	±%
National	Aussie Malcolm	9,725	49.48	
Labour	Mike Moore	8,394	42.71	−5.48
Values	Paul Lunberg	991	5.04	
Social Credit	Leslie Clark	497	2.52	
National Socialist	Colin King-Ansell	19	0.09	−0.09
Independent Labour	Marilyn Voss	16	0.08	
Democratic Labour	Norma Hughes	11	0.05	
Majority		1,331	6.77	
Turnout		19,653	73.90	−14.65
Registered electors		26,591		

=== 1972 election ===
1972 general election: Eden
Party	Candidate	Votes	%	±%
Labour	Mike Moore	9,046	48.19	
National	Mary Kidd	8,258	43.99	
Values	Bert Keiller	656	3.49	
Social Credit	Neil Morrison	646	3.44	
New Democratic	C W Bott	60	0.31	
Independent	F W Bell	48	0.25	
National Socialist	Colin King-Ansell	35	0.18	
Liberal Reform	G T Tudor	21	0.11	
Majority		788	4.19	
Turnout		18,770	88.55	+1.21
Registered electors		21,196		

=== 1969 election ===
1969 general election: Eden
Party	Candidate	Votes	%	±%
National	John Rae	8,887	48.88	−5.70
Labour	Keith Sinclair	8,569	47.13	
Social Credit	Heather-Ann Molloy	975	5.36	
Majority		67	0.36	−18.17
Turnout		18,180	89.76	+7.42
Registered electors		20,254		

=== 1966 election ===
1966 general election: Eden
Party	Candidate	Votes	%	±%
National	John Rae	7,502	54.58	−3.15
Labour	John William Stewart	4,954	36.04	
Social Credit	Thomas Tansfield	1,288	9.37	
Majority		2,548	18.53	−3.13
Turnout		13,744	82.34	−5.77
Registered electors		16,690		

=== 1963 election ===
1963 general election: Eden
Party	Candidate	Votes	%	±%
National	John Rae	8,887	57.73	+3.51
Labour	Frank Knipe	5,552	36.06	
Social Credit	Alfred George Grove	632	4.10	+0.61
Liberal	William Wynyard Rayner	323	2.09	
Majority		3,335	21.66	+9.72
Turnout		15,394	88.11	+1.07
Registered electors		17,471		

=== 1960 election ===
1960 general election: Eden
Party	Candidate	Votes	%	±%
National	John Rae	8,632	54.22	
Labour	Russell Penney	6,730	42.27	
Social Credit	Alfred George Grove	556	3.49	+0.09
Majority		1,902	11.94	
Turnout		15,918	87.04	−5.55
Registered electors		18,288		

=== 1957 election ===
1957 general election: Eden
Party	Candidate	Votes	%	±%
National	Duncan Rae	8,744	49.71	+1.83
Labour	Ian Watkins	8,246	46.88	
Social Credit	Alfred George Grove	599	3.40	
Majority		498	2.83	+2.78
Turnout		17,589	92.59	+3.40
Registered electors		18,995		

=== 1954 election ===
1954 general election: Eden
Party	Candidate	Votes	%	±%
National	Duncan Rae	6,910	47.88	
Labour	John Stewart	6,902	47.74	
Social Credit	Allan Donovan	644	4.45	
Majority		8	0.05	
Turnout		14,456	89.19	+2.01
Registered electors		16,208		

=== 1951 election ===
1951 general election: Eden
Party	Candidate	Votes	%	±%
National	Wilfred Fortune	7,016	62.47	+3.15
Labour	John Ronald Burfitt	4,214	37.53	
Majority		2,802	24.95	+6.30
Turnout		11,230	87.18	−7.19
Registered electors		12,881		

=== 1949 election ===
1949 general election: Eden
Party	Candidate	Votes	%	±%
National	Wilfred Fortune	7,184	59.32	+4.33
Labour	Pat Curran	4,925	40.68	
Majority		2,259	18.65	+8.67
Turnout		12,109	94.37	+2.18
Registered electors		12,831		

=== 1946 election ===
1946 general election: Eden
Party	Candidate	Votes	%	±%
National	Wilfred Fortune	7,055	54.99	+9.38
Labour	Warren Freer	5,774	45.01	
Majority		1,281	9.98	
Turnout		12,829	92.19	−0.82
Registered electors		13,915		

=== 1943 election ===
1943 general election: Eden
Party	Candidate	Votes	%	±%
Labour	Bill Anderton	7,266	45.70	−10.73
National	Wilfred Fortune	7,252	45.61	
Democratic Labour	Terrence Nixon	730	4.59	
Real Democracy	Gertrude Brooks	304	1.91	
People's Movement	David Wilson	201	1.26	
Informal votes		149	0.93	+0.10
Majority		14	0.08	−14.60
Turnout		15,899	91.37	+0.13
Registered electors		17,400		

=== 1938 election ===
1938 general election: Eden
Party	Candidate	Votes	%	±%
Labour	Bill Anderton	8,969	56.43	+10.84
National	Donald Pool	6,636	41.75	
Country Party	Albert Robinson	155	0.97	
Informal votes		132	0.83	+0.22
Majority		2,333	14.68	−4.22
Turnout		15,892	91.50	+1.86
Registered electors		17,368		

=== 1935 election ===
1935 general election: Eden
Party	Candidate	Votes	%	±%
Labour	Bill Anderton	5,946	45.59	+14.37
Democrat	Arthur Stallworthy	3,481	26.69	−15.57
United	Clifton Clarke	3,458	26.51	
Independent	Cecil Pickering	155	1.18	
Informal votes		80	0.61	−0.84
Majority		2,465	18.90	
Turnout		13,040	89.64	+7.64
Registered electors		14,546		

=== 1931 election ===
1931 general election: Eden
Party	Candidate	Votes	%	±%
United	Arthur Stallworthy	4,860	42.26	−7.71
Labour	Bill Anderton	3,590	31.22	+12.41
Independent	William Henry Nagle	1,823	15.85	
Reform	Richard Glover-Clark	874	7.60	
Independent	Vivian Potter	352	3.06	−26.47
Informal votes		169	1.45	−0.05
Majority		1,270	11.04	−9.41
Turnout		11,668	82.00	−3.61
Registered electors		14,230		

=== 1928 election ===
1928 general election: Eden
Party	Candidate	Votes	%	±%
United	Arthur Stallworthy	5,953	49.98	
Reform	Vivian Potter	3,517	29.53	
Labour	Bill Anderton	2,241	18.81	
Christian Socialist	Ormond Burton	200	1.68	
Informal votes		135	1.12	−0.33
Majority		2,436	20.45	
Turnout		12,046	85.29	
Registered electors		14,123		

=== 1926 by-election ===
1926 Eden by-election
Party	Candidate	Votes	%	±%
Labour	Rex Mason	4,589	41.54	+2.06
Reform	James Gunson	4,163	37.68	
Independent Reform	Ellen Melville	2,197	19.89	
Informal votes		99	0.90	−0.02
Majority		3,811	3.86	
Turnout		11,048	80.03	−11.23
Labour gain from Reform		Swing		

=== 1925 election ===
1925 general election: Eden
Party	Candidate	Votes	%	±%
Reform	James Parr	7,158	58.61	−13.33
Labour	Rex Mason	4,822	39.48	+2.03
Liberal	Frank Walter Grigg	118	0.96	
Informal votes		113	0.92	−0.18
Majority		2,336	19.13	+11.30
Turnout		12,211	91.26	−0.77
Registered electors		13,379		

=== 1922 election ===
1922 general election: Eden
Party	Candidate	Votes	%	±%
Reform	James Parr	3,901	45.28	−6.69
Labour	Rex Mason	3,226	37.45	
Liberal	Frederick Stanley Morton	1,392	16.15	
Informal votes		95	1.10	−0.30
Majority		675	7.83	−20.25
Turnout		8,614	92.03	+8.35
Registered electors		9,359		

=== 1919 election ===
1919 general election: Eden
Party	Candidate	Votes	%	±%
Reform	James Parr	3,431	51.97	−2.02
Labour	Oscar McBrine	1,577	23.89	
Liberal	Robert Hornblow	1,500	22.72	
Informal votes		93	1.40	+0.52
Majority		1,854	28.08	+2.73
Turnout		6,601	83.68	−2.52
Registered electors		7,888		

=== 1914 election ===
1914 general election: Eden
Party	Candidate	Votes	%	±%
Reform	James Parr	5,231	53.99	
Liberal	William Tuck	2,775	28.64	
Social Democrat	Wesley Richards	1,682	17.36	
Informal votes		86	0.88	
Majority		2,456	25.35	
Turnout		9,688	86.20	
Registered electors		11,239		

=== 1899 election ===
1899 general election: Eden
Party	Candidate	Votes	%	±%
Conservative	John Bollard	2,255	50.04	
Liberal	Malcolm Niccol	2,251	49.96	
Informal votes		52	0.94	
Majority		4	0.09	
Turnout		4,558	82.30	
Registered electors		5,538		

=== 1893 election ===
1893 general election: Eden
Party	Candidate	Votes	%	±%
Conservative	Edwin Mitchelson	1,515	43.03	−17.73
Liberal	Malcolm Niccol	1,189	33.77	
Liberal	Joseph Dargaville	817	23.20	
Majority		326	9.26	−12.27
Turnout		3,521	75.20	+27.59
Registered electors		4,682		

=== 1890 election ===
1890 general election: Eden
Party	Candidate	Votes	%	±%
Conservative	Edwin Mitchelson	728	60.76	
Liberal	Joseph Greenwood	470	39.23	
Majority		258	21.53	
Turnout		1,198	47.61	
Registered electors		2,516		

=== 1887 election ===
1887 general election: Eden
Party	Candidate	Votes	%	±%
Conservative	Edwin Mitchelson	901	65.96	
Independent	J. A. Connell	465	34.04	
Majority		436	31.92	
Total valid votes		1,366	99.49	
Informal votes		7	0.51	
Turnout		1,373	72.26	
Registered electors		1,900		

=== 1879 election ===
1879 general election: Eden
Party	Candidate	Votes	%	±%
Independent	Joseph Tole	409	56.96	+1.59
Independent	Frederick Whitaker	309	43.04	
Majority		100	13.92	
Total valid votes		718		
Informal votes		9		
Rejected ballots		4		
Turnout		731		
Registered electors				

NB: Officially there are 731 ballot papers, 9 informal votes, and 2*2 duplicate votes. After removing 13 from consideration, 718 total valid votes were counted. So technically, turnout is 729 voters.

=== 1876 election ===
1876 general election: Eden
Party	Candidate	Votes	%	±%
Independent	Joseph Tole	263	55.37	
Independent	Allan Kerr Taylor	212	44.63	
Majority		51	10.74	
Turnout		475	64.54	
Registered electors		736		
