= Lesley Max =

New Zealand children's advocate

Dame Lesley Max DNZM MBE
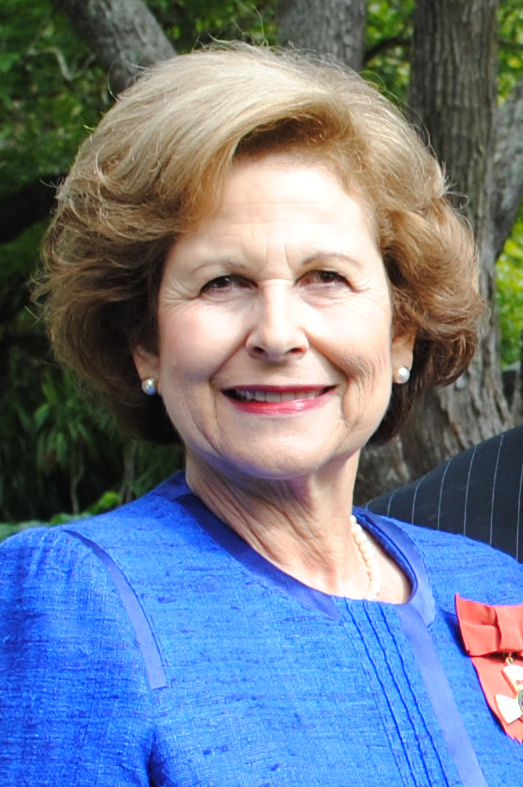
- Max in 2010
- Born: Lesley Shieff; 20 September 1945 (age 81); Auckland, New Zealand
- Education: Takapuna Grammar School
- Alma mater: University of Auckland
- Known for: Children's advocacy
- Spouse: Robert Peter Max (m. 1967)
- Children: 4
- Relatives: Barbara Goodman (cousin)

Dame Lesley Max DNZM MBE (née Shieff; born 20 September 1945) is a New Zealand children's advocate.

== Early life and family ==
Max was born Lesley Shieff in Auckland on 20 September 1945. She was educated at Takapuna Grammar School, and then studied at the University of Auckland between 1963 and 1966, graduating MA(Hons).

In 1967, she married Robert Peter Max, an orthodontist, and the couple went on to have four children.

== Career ==
Max worked as a secondary school teacher and freelance journalist. After one of her children was born with a disability, Max began to focus on child development, and finding ways to allow children to develop to their full potential.

In 1990, Max and Gordon Dryden established the Great Potentials Foundation, an organisation that assists underprivileged children and young people to succeed, with Max becoming the chief executive officer. She advocated strongly for the formation of a national programme for the prevention of child abuse, which led to the establishment of Family Start. She has also chaired the Parenting Council, was a government appointee on the Northern Regional Health Authority and the Family Violence Advisory Committee, and was a founding member of the Brainwave Trust. Max introduced programmes to New Zealand to assist parents and young people, including the Home International Programme for Parents and Youngsters (HIPPY) and the Mentoring and Tutoring Education Scheme (MATES). Her book, Children: Endangered Species?, was published by Penguin in 1990.

Max was an executive member of the Auckland branch of the IHC Society, and a member of advisory committees at Auckland Institute of Technology, Auckland College of Education, and the University of Auckland, and is patron of the Manukau Institute of Technology early childhood centre and the Family Help Trust. She has served as secretary of the New Zealand Jewish Council and an executive member of the New Zealand Zionist Federation.

== Honours and awards ==
In 1990, Max was awarded the New Zealand 1990 Commemoration Medal. In the 1994 New Year Honours, Max was appointed a Member of the Order of the British Empire, for services to children. She was made a Dame Companion of the New Zealand Order of Merit, also for services to children, in the 2010 New Year Honours. Max's damehood followed that of her cousin, Barbara Goodman, in 1989; it is thought to be the first time two Jewish cousins received damehoods.
