= Richard Northey =

New Zealand politician

Richard Northey ONZM
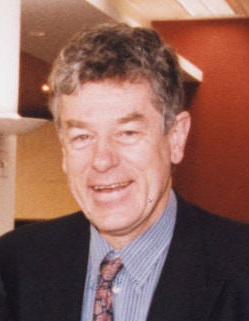
- Northey in 1999

Member of the New Zealand Parliament for Onehunga
- In office 6 November 1993 – 12 October 1996
- Preceded by: Grahame Thorne
- Succeeded by: Constituency abolished

Member of the New Zealand Parliament for Eden
- In office 14 July 1984 – 27 October 1990
- Preceded by: Aussie Malcolm
- Succeeded by: Christine Fletcher

Personal details
- Born: 28 April 1945 (age 81) Hamilton, New Zealand
- Party: Labour
- Profession: Lecturer

Richard John Northey ONZM (born 28 April 1945) is a New Zealand politician. He was an MP from 1984 to 1990, and again from 1993 to 1996. He served on the Auckland Council between 2010 and 2013, and is a member of the Labour Party.

== Biography ==
=== Early life and career ===
Northey was born in Hamilton in 1945 and was educated at Auckland Grammar School. He then attended the University of Auckland where he obtained a Bachelor of Science in chemistry and physics and a first class Master of Arts in political science.

He then found employment as a youth and recreation officer, arts advisor and employment officer. He became president of the New Zealand Campaign for Nuclear Disarmament and served on the committee of the New Zealand Consultative Committee on Disarmament. He was also an executive member of the Auckland District Council of Social Service and Citizens' Advocacy and the president of the Citizens' Association for Racial Equality (CARE).

He joined the Labour Party and became chairman of Princes Street Labour as well as the Eden Central and Orakei branches. Later he was chair of the Tamaki and Eden electorate committees. Northey also was the vice-president, and later president, of the Auckland Labour Regional Council and was a member of Labour's national executive as a youth representative.

=== Local body politics ===
Northey first stood as a Labour Party candidate for the Auckland City Council at the 1968 local elections. He stood for the council unsuccessfully four times before finally winning a seat at a by-election in February 1979. He lost his seat at the next election in 1980. After exiting the council Northey stood unsuccessfully for Parliament against the then Prime Minister, Robert Muldoon, in the Tamaki electorate in the 1981 election. In the 1983 local elections Northey regained a seat on the city council before deciding not to stand for re-election in 1986.

=== Member of Parliament ===
New Zealand Parliament
Years	Term	Electorate	Party
1984–1987	41st	Eden	Labour
1987–1990	42nd	Eden	Labour
1993–1996	44th	Onehunga	Labour

He was first elected to Parliament in the 1984 election as MP for Eden, replacing National's Aussie Malcolm. He was re-elected in the 1987 election, but was defeated in the National Party's landslide victory in the 1990 election. During this time he was chair of the Auckland Labour MPs Lobby. In 1986 Northey led the New Zealand government's youth delegation to China, attended the inter-parliamentary union conference in Bangkok in 1987 and was a delegate at the first parliamentary conference on the global environment in Washington in 1990. In September 1990 he stood for the Labour Party leadership against Foreign Affairs Minister Mike Moore. His candidature was a surprise to most given that he was not a member of cabinet. He was defeated by Moore by the wide margin of 41 votes to 15.

After losing his seat in 1990, he attempted to regain a seat on the Auckland City Council. He stood as a candidate in a 1991 by-election for the Maungakiekie Ward, finishing runner-up to Ken Graham.

In the 1993 election he returned to Parliament, now representing Onehunga which he took off National's Grahame Thorne. He was selected as the Labour candidate in Onehunga in preference to Chris Diack, a supporter of controversial former finance minister Roger Douglas. After missing out on the nomination Diack and his allies in the branch drained the electorate cash accounts by lump paying more than $6000 in outstanding debts to party headquarters, leaving just $7 to fund Northey's campaign in an act of spite. They then took ownership of an income-earning rental house from the Onehunga Labour Party and used it to instead fund the ACT Party (to whom Diack defected to in 1994) before finally being returned to the Labour Party after a long legal case in 2004.

After re-entering Parliament Northey was aligned to Helen Clark who replaced Moore as leader. Clark appointed him Labour's Shadow Minister of Local Government and Youth Affairs. In a 1995 reshuffle he was also given the disarmament and arms control portfolio. In the 1996 election he contested the Maungakiekie seat after boundary changes caused by the introduction of mixed-member proportional (MMP) representation, but was defeated in an upset by National's Belinda Vernon. He was not ranked high enough on Labour's list to remain in Parliament.

In June 2020 it was revealed that the New Zealand Security Intelligence Service had spied upon Northey during his time in Parliament, under the pretext of his support for racial equality and nuclear disarmament. At the time he was chair of the Justice and Law Reform Select Committee, which was responsible for financial oversight of the SIS, and of legislation altering its powers.

=== Return to local politics ===
Auckland Council
Years	Ward	Affiliation
2010–2013	Maungakiekie-Tāmaki	Labour

He has since entered local politics, serving on the Auckland City Council holding senior committee roles. He was elected to the Penrose Ward in 1998 until 2001 when he changed to the Maungakiekie-Tamaki Ward, holding his seat until the council was abolished in 2010. In 2007, Richard Northey became leader of the City Vision-Labour bloc on council.

Northey became a member of Labour's national council for six years and was chairman of the party's policy committee. In 2000 he stood unsuccessfully to replace Bob Harvey as President of the Labour Party, but was defeated by Mike Williams.

He was elected to the new Auckland Council in 2010, representing the Maungakiekie-Tāmaki Ward. In 2013 he contested the Maungakiekie-Tāmaki Ward again but was defeated by Denise Krum.

At the 2016 Auckland elections, Northey was elected as a member of the Waitematā Local Board for the City Vision ticket. He was re-elected in the 2019 Auckland local elections, and was subsequently elected Chair of the Local Board.

== Personal life ==
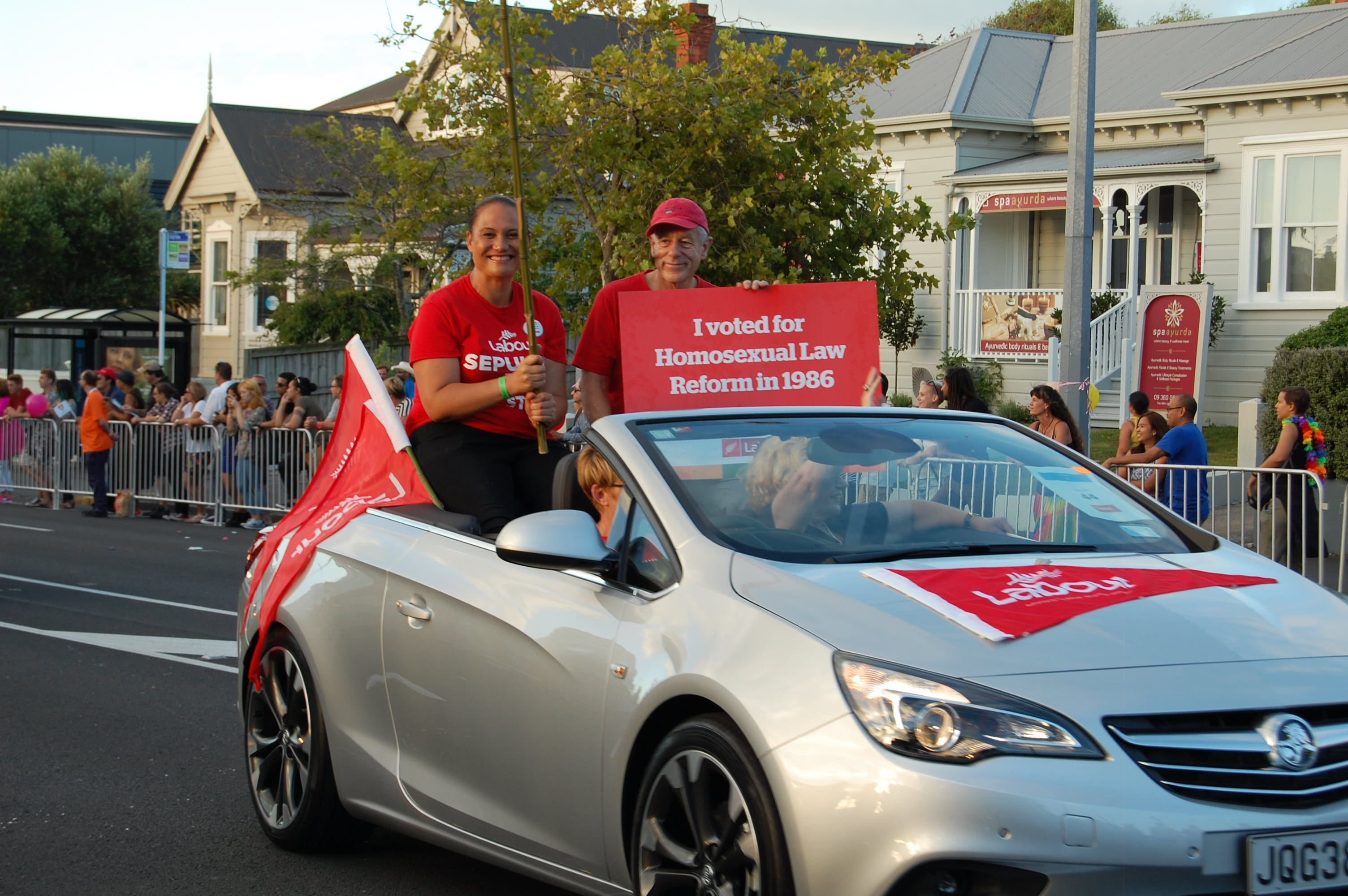
Richard Northey on Auckland Pride Parade 2016 holding a sign reading 'I voted for Homosexual Law Reform in 1986'

Northey was a lecturer in political studies and planning at the University of Auckland. In 1990, he was awarded the New Zealand 1990 Commemoration Medal. In the 2002 New Year Honours, he was appointed an Officer of the New Zealand Order of Merit, for public services.

== Notes ==
New Zealand Parliament
Preceded by Aussie Malcolm	Member of Parliament for Eden; 1984–1990	Succeeded by Christine Fletcher
Preceded by Grahame Thorne	Member of Parliament for Onehunga; 1993–1996	Constituency abolished
