= Colin Kay =

New Zealand sportsman and politician

Colin Kay CBE JP

34th Mayor of Auckland City
- In office 1980–1983
- Deputy: John Strevens
- Preceded by: Dove-Myer Robinson
- Succeeded by: Catherine Tizard

Personal details
- Born: Colin Milton Kay; 30 October 1926 Auckland, New Zealand
- Died: 5 June 2008 (aged 81)
- Spouse: Jill Viva Kay (d. 2015)

Colin Milton Kay CBE JP (30 October 1926 – 5 June 2008) was a New Zealand sportsman and politician. He was the 34th Mayor of Auckland City, elected for one term serving from 1980 to 1983, and chairman of the Auckland Regional Council from 1986 to 1992. He was also the triple jump champion of New Zealand in 1950 and 1951, and represented New Zealand at the 1950 Empire Games in Auckland.

== Biography ==
Kay was born in Auckland in 1926, his father owned and operated a womenswear manufacturing and retailing business, and his mother was a homemaker. The family lived in Remuera, and Kay attended King's College, Auckland from 1939 to 1943, where he was a house prefect, and won a tennis championship and an intercollegiate high jump competition. His mother supported his sports, attending all his sports meetings, and telling him to dig a pit in part of the family tennis court so he could practice his jumping. Kay later enrolled in accounting at the University of Auckland, while not completing his studies he was active in athletics and played rugby. He worked at and later purchased his father's business. Kay was Jewish.

Kay competed in the 1950 British Empire Games in Auckland, coming 8th in the hop step and jump at 13.91m. He was the New Zealand triple jump champion in 1950 with a jump of 14.14m, and in 1951 with a jump of 14.31m.

The University of Auckland Athletics Club successfully nominated Kay to lead the national team to the 1962 Commonwealth Games team in Perth, where New Zealand won 32 medals including 10 golds. He achieved a goal to raise $150,000 for the 1974 Commonwealth Games in Christchurch, and was on the board of directors for the 1990 Commonwealth Games in Auckland.

Kay founded the Auckland Joggers Club with Arthur Lydiard in 1962, and the annual Auckland Round the Bays fun run in 1973. With Douglas Myers in 1977 he jointly founded the New Zealand Sports Foundation, where he served as Governor for 16 years. He was a founder and the chairman of the Peter Snell Institute of Sport in 2000, and organisation with the objective of finding and promoting sporting talent in New Zealand.

He was first elected to the Auckland City Council in 1971, and was later elected mayor of Auckland in 1980, succeeding Dove-Myer Robinson. At the next election in 1983, he was beaten by Catherine Tizard. In 1986, he became chairperson of the Auckland Regional Authority (ARA). After the 1989 New Zealand local government reforms, ARA became the Auckland Regional Council and Kay remained chairperson until 1992.

Kay was appointed a Commander of the Order of the British Empire in the 1990 New Year Honours, for services to local government, sport and the community. He died in 2008, more than one year after suffering a major stroke, and was survived by his wife and three sons.

The main stand of Mt Smart Stadium was named the Colin Kay stand in his honour.

Political offices
Preceded by Dove-Myer Robinson	Mayor of Auckland City; 1980–1983	Succeeded by Catherine Tizard
Preceded by Fred Thomas	Chair of the Auckland Regional Authority; 1986–1989	Office renamed
New office	Chair of the Auckland Regional Council; 1989–1992	Succeeded by Phil Warren
