= Barbara Goodman =

New Zealand politician (1932–2013)

Dame Barbara Goodman DBE QSO JP
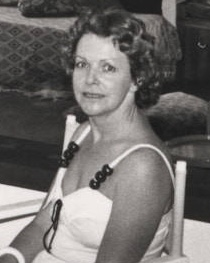
- Goodman in 1978
- Born: Pearl Barbara Robinson; 5 October 1932; Auckland, New Zealand
- Died: 21 June 2013 (aged 80); Auckland, New Zealand
- Education: St Cuthbert's College
- Spouse: Harold Goodman (m. 1954; died 1988)
- Children: 3
- Relatives: Dove-Myer Robinson (uncle); Lesley Max (cousin)

Dame Pearl Barbara Goodman DBE QSO JP (née Robinson; 5 October 1932 – 21 June 2013) was a New Zealand politician based in Auckland, the country's largest city.

== Early life and family ==
Born in Auckland on 5 October 1932, Goodman was educated at St Cuthbert's College. She married Harold Goodman in 1954, and the couple went on to have three children.

== Community and political career ==
Goodman was mayoress of Auckland City from 1968 to 1980, during the mayoralty of her uncle Sir Dove-Myer Robinson. Her husband, Harold, was an Auckland city councillor and he served as deputy mayor of Auckland City in the late 1970s. In 1973, she opened a therapeutic pool at Kingseat Hospital. Goodman was made a justice of the peace in 1980.

In the 1981 Queen's Birthday Honours, Goodman was appointed a Companion of the Queen's Service Order for community service.

Goodman's husband died on 16 August 1988, and she succeeded him onto the council in a by-election, representing the Citizens and Ratepayers group. She championed causes including homosexual law reform, abortion rights, the volunteer movement and campaigned for the Odyssey House Trust for drug rehabilitation. She served as Odyssey House Auckland's chairwoman from 1981 to 1992, overseeing a range of specialist programmes for adolescents, parents, and other adults experiencing serious difficulties with substance abuse, gambling, and other associated problems. She was patron of Volunteering Auckland for many years. In 2006, she opposed the New Zealand government's plan to build a $500 million rugby stadium on Quay Street in Auckland's waterfront area.

In the 1989 New Year Honours, Goodman was appointed a Dame Commander of the Order of the British Empire (DBE), for services to the community.

== Later life and death ==
Goodman spearheaded the project for a memorial sculpture to her uncle, Sir Dove-Myer Robinson, in Aotea Square, which was built in 2002. The sculpture celebrates the contribution "Robbie" made to the city.

Following Goodman's DBE in 1989, her cousin, Lesley Max, was also made a Dame Commander of the New Zealand Order of Merit, for services to children, in the 2010 New Year Honours. It is understood to be the first time two Jewish cousins were both made dames.

Goodman died in Auckland on 21 June 2013, aged 80, having suffered from Parkinson's disease for several years.
