= 1929 Auckland City mayoral election =

New Zealand mayoral election

- 1 May 1929
- Turnout: 23,990
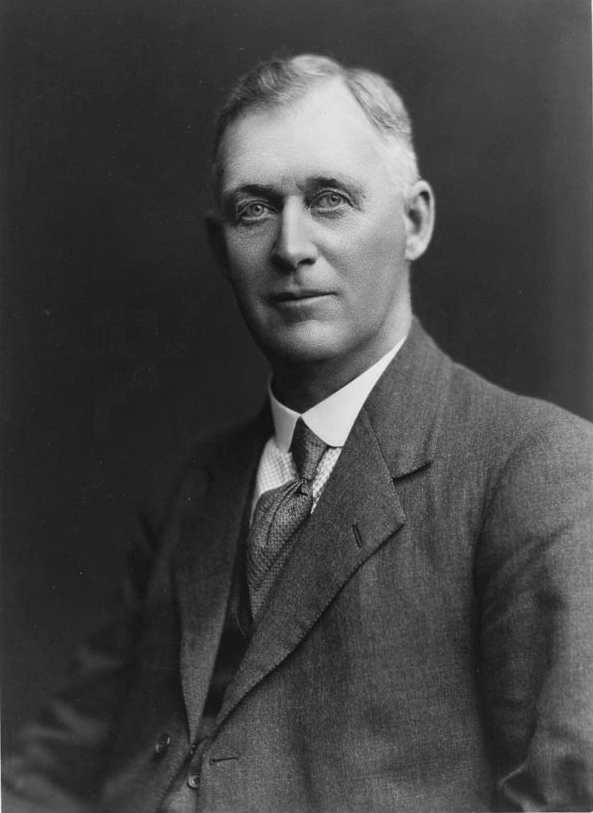

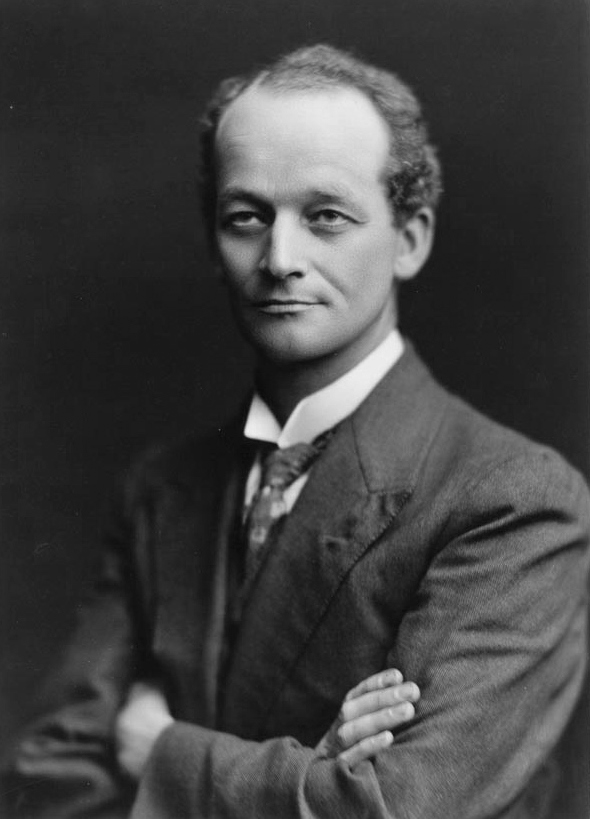
| Candidate | George Baildon | Tom Bloodworth |
| Party | Progressive Citizens' | Labour |
| Popular vote | 7,595 | 6,679 |
| Percentage | 31.65 | 27.84 |
Mayor before election
George Baildon
Elected mayor
George Baildon

The 1929 Auckland City mayoral election was part of the New Zealand local elections held that same year. In 1929, elections were held for the Mayor of Auckland plus other local government positions including twenty-one city councillors. The polling was conducted using the standard first-past-the-post electoral method.

== Mayoralty results ==
1929 Auckland mayoral election
| Party | Candidate | Votes | % | ±% |
|---|---|---|---|---|
| Progressive Citizens' | George Baildon | 7,595 | 31.65 | −9.84 |
| Labour | Tom Bloodworth | 6,679 | 27.84 | −6.09 |
| Independent | Hubert Earle Vaile | 5,187 | 21.62 | |
| Independent | Walter Harry Murray | 4,226 | 17.61 | |
| Informal votes | | 303 | 1.26 | −0.10 |
| Majority | | 916 | 3.81 | −3.75 |
| Turnout | | 23,990 | | |

== Councillor results ==
1929 Auckland City Council election
| Party | Candidate | Votes | % | ±% |
|---|---|---|---|---|
| Labour | Tom Bloodworth | 12,061 | 50.27 | −5.29 |
| Progressive Citizens' | George Hutchison | 11,310 | 47.14 | |
| Independent | Walter Harry Murray | 8,946 | 37.29 | −0.01 |
| Progressive Citizens' | Andrew Entrican | 8,502 | 35.43 | −15.49 |
| Progressive Citizens' | John Dempsey | 7,758 | 32.33 | −17.68 |
| Labour | Ted Phelan | 7,692 | 32.06 | −13.28 |
| Progressive Citizens' | George Ashley | 7,359 | 30.67 | −9.37 |
| Progressive Citizens' | Matthew John Bennett | 7,354 | 30.65 | −19.53 |
| Labour | Fred Bartram | 7,179 | 29.92 | |
| Progressive Citizens' | George Brownlee | 7,147 | 29.79 | −6.94 |
| Independent | William Lang Casey | 7,118 | 29.67 | −8.29 |
| Independent | James Donald | 7,035 | 29.32 | −13.59 |
| Progressive Citizens' | George Grey Campbell | 7,030 | 29.30 | −5.73 |
| Independent | Ellen Melville | 6,998 | 29.17 | −19.22 |
| Independent | Alice Basten | 6,868 | 28.62 | −8.39 |
| Progressive Citizens' | Brent Llewellyn Bagnall | 6,748 | 28.12 | |
| Independent | Balfour Mears Irvine | 6,550 | 27.30 | |
| Independent | John Lundon | 6,505 | 27.11 | −2.28 |
| Independent | John Barr Patterson | 6,081 | 25.34 | −18.74 |
| Independent | Michael John Coyle | 6,059 | 25.25 | −19.60 |
| Independent | Harold Percy Burton | 5,963 | 24.85 | |
| Independent | Dawson Donaldson | 5,840 | 24.34 | |
| Independent | Alfred Hall Skelton | 5,795 | 24.15 | −11.58 |
| Progressive Citizens' | John Allum | 5,774 | 24.06 | −22.72 |
| Progressive Citizens' | Thomas McNab | 5,771 | 24.05 | −8.42 |
| Independent | Samuel Crookes | 5,723 | 23.85 | −19.46 |
| Independent | Claude James Lovegrove | 5,586 | 23.28 | |
| Labour | Oscar McBrine | 5,428 | 22.62 | −15.95 |
| Progressive Citizens' | Sidney Takle | 5,271 | 21.97 | |
| Labour | Edna Macky | 5,190 | 21.63 | |
| Progressive Citizens' | Percy John Goldfinch | 5,038 | 21.00 | |
| Independent | Leonard Bailey Busfield | 5,004 | 20.85 | |
| Progressive Citizens' | John W. Kealy | 4,997 | 20.82 | |
| Independent | John William Carr | 4,983 | 20.77 | |
| Labour | John Stacey Adeane | 4,927 | 20.53 | |
| Independent | Albert Glover | 4,925 | 20.52 | |
| Progressive Citizens' | William Hugh McKinney | 4,919 | 20.50 | −10.54 |
| Independent | Almond Edmund Marsden Dunningham | 4,870 | 20.30 | |
| Progressive Citizens' | Herbert Bellam | 4,837 | 20.16 | |
| Labour | Dick Barter | 4,761 | 19.84 | −14.13 |
| Progressive Citizens' | John Francis Shanly | 4,712 | 19.64 | −6.34 |
| Labour | Jim Purtell | 4,517 | 18.82 | −14.17 |
| Independent | Duncan Carmichael Fraser | 4,492 | 18.72 | |
| Independent | Harold Schmidt | 4,470 | 18.63 | |
| Independent | George Leonard Brett | 4,371 | 18.22 | −9.90 |
| Independent | Hallyburton Johnstone | 4,349 | 18.12 | −4.28 |
| Labour | Alice Cassie | 4,257 | 17.74 | |
| Labour | Hugh Campbell | 4,148 | 17.29 | |
| Labour | John Oliver Liddell | 3,990 | 16.63 | |
| Labour | Bill Schramm | 3,980 | 16.59 | −0.10 |
| Independent | James Grace | 3,976 | 16.57 | |
| Independent | Frederick Waterston Matthews | 3,916 | 16.32 | |
| Independent | James Francis Hosking | 3,820 | 15.92 | |
| Labour | John Thomas Jennings | 3,794 | 15.84 | |
| Progressive Citizens' | Dick Thompson | 3,776 | 15.73 | −10.09 |
| Labour | Bernard Martin | 3,759 | 15.66 | −13.18 |
| Independent | George Russell Magee | 3,572 | 14.88 | |
| Independent | Isaac Gelston Gray | 3,319 | 13.83 | |
| Progressive Citizens' | Arthur Gilbert Quartley | 3,087 | 12.86 | |
| Independent | John Heard Ansell | 2,999 | 12.50 | |
| Independent | Walter Thomas Smith | 2,962 | 12.34 | |
| Independent | George Rochester Metcalfe | 2,934 | 12.23 | −11.20 |
| Labour | Harry Gordon Staley | 2,881 | 12.00 | |
| Independent | Harry Percival Taylor | 2,613 | 10.89 | |
| Labour | Paul Richardson | 2,218 | 9.24 | |
| Independent | John Jolley Thomas | 1,312 | 5.46 | |
| Independent | Harry Woodroff | 1,073 | 4.47 | |
