= 1935 Auckland City mayoral election =

New Zealand mayoral election

- 8 May 1935
- Turnout: 37,238 (60.36%)
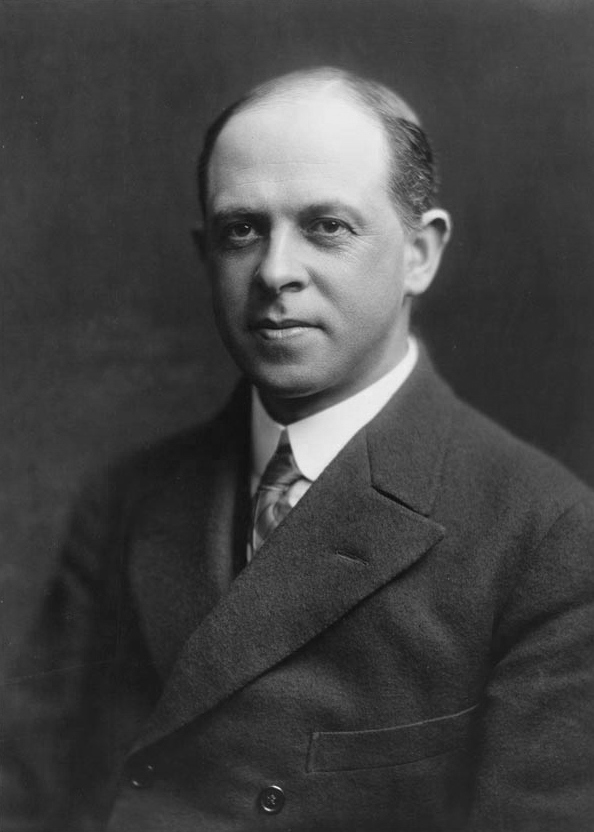

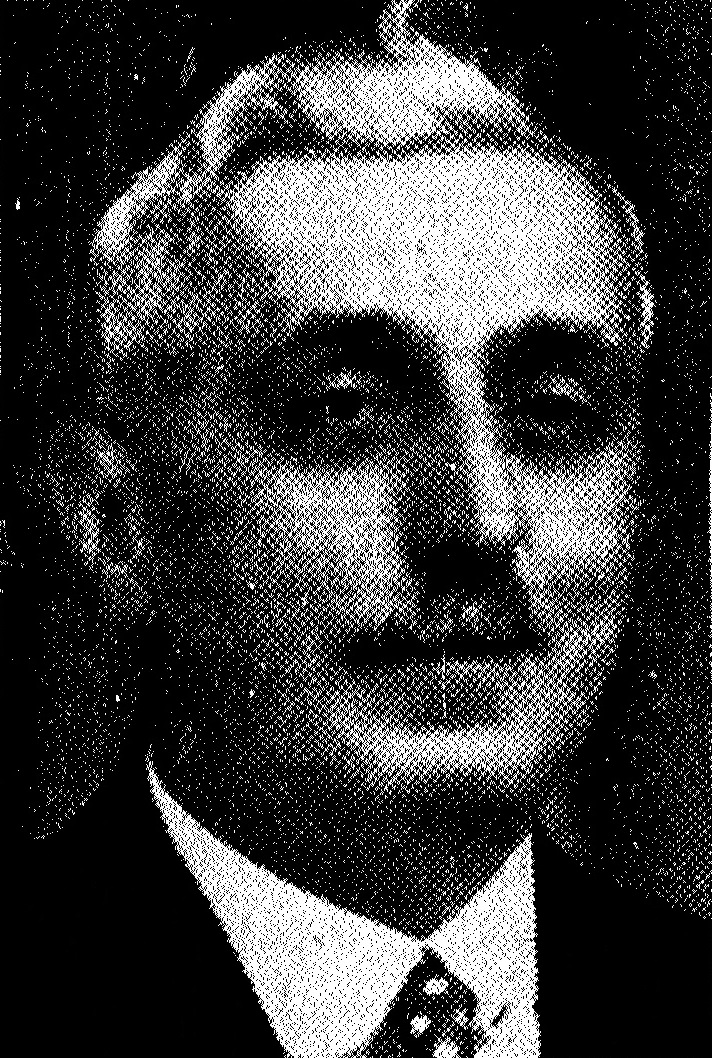
| Candidate | Ernest Davis | Joe Sayegh |
| Party | Citizens Committee | Labour |
| Popular vote | 14,267 | 13,904 |
| Percentage | 38.31 | 37.33 |
Mayor before election
George Hutchison
Elected mayor
Ernest Davis

The 1935 Auckland City mayoral election was part of the New Zealand local elections held that same year. In 1935, elections were held for the Mayor of Auckland plus other local government positions including twenty-one city councillors. The polling was conducted using the standard first-past-the-post electoral method.

== Background ==
The campaign featured a selection controversy when the Labour Party selected local businessman Joe Sayegh over prominent lawyer and MP Rex Mason with the blessing of Auckland Labour Representation Committee executive Fred Young. Sayegh was viewed a respectable individual and competent city councillor, but most gave him little chance of beating Citizens Committee candidate Ernest Davis. As Young had been employed by Davis for many years, John A. Lee and several Labour MPs alleged that Young had been bribed by Davis to ensure the selection of a weak Labour candidate for the Mayoralty which caused a rift in the Auckland Labour Party. Sayegh's campaign was not helped due to continued interference by Lee who tried to discredit Sayegh, slandering him as a "dumb wop fellow who could not even speak English". Regardless, Sayegh polled extremely well in the election, exceeding predictions and lost to Davis by only 363 votes.

Councillor Ted Phelan had earlier declined to seek the Labour nomination for mayor, citing a conflict of interest, as he was also running the Hotel Auckland (which was owned by Davis), who had already declared his candidacy. Despite Sayegh's nomination, the returning officer received a nomination for Mason, whose consent was telegraphed from Wellington, though he later sent a second telegraph to withdraw. Ellen Melville also announced her intention to stand for mayor, but ultimately decided not to stand "in view of the confusion of issues." She successfully sought re-election to the council.

The main talking point following the election was that the Labour Party had won a majority on the city council winning 15 of the 21 seats. This was the first (and only) time Labour had ever done so. There was also a huge turnout in voters with a record 60.36% of electors casting their votes, much higher than usual, an increase of nearly 12% from the 1933 election.

== Mayoralty results ==
1935 Auckland mayoral election
| Party | Candidate | Votes | % | ±% |
|---|---|---|---|---|
| Citizens Committee | Ernest Davis | 14,267 | 38.31 | |
| Labour | Joe Sayegh | 13,904 | 37.33 | |
| Independent | Arthur Stallworthy | 8,569 | 23.01 | |
| Informal votes | | 498 | 1.33 | −0.85 |
| Majority | | 363 | 0.97 | |
| Turnout | | 37,238 | 60.36 | +11.58 |

== Councillor results ==
1935 Auckland local election
| Party | Candidate | Votes | % | ±% |
|---|---|---|---|---|
| Labour | Joe Sayegh | 18,090 | 59.82 | +16.61 |
| Labour | Ted Phelan | 17,603 | 58.21 | +9.99 |
| Labour | John Albert Mason | 16,462 | 54.44 | +11.11 |
| Labour | Arthur Rosser | 16,238 | 53.70 | +14.73 |
| Labour | Bill Anderton | 16,205 | 53.59 | +12.79 |
| Labour | John William Yarnall | 15,266 | 50.48 | +11.08 |
| Labour | Charles Bailey | 15,231 | 50.37 | +10.02 |
| Labour | Ernest Frank Andrews | 14,904 | 49.28 | +8.89 |
| Citizens Committee | Leonard Coakley | 14,449 | 47.78 | +2.09 |
| Labour | Peter Carr | 13,882 | 45.90 | |
| Citizens Committee | Sir George Richardson | 13,774 | 45.55 | |
| Independent | Tom Bloodworth | 13,406 | 44.33 | +2.60 |
| Labour | Bernard Martin | 13,346 | 44.13 | +8.27 |
| Labour | John Stewart | 13,199 | 43.65 | +7.76 |
| Labour | John Thomas Jennings | 13,153 | 43.49 | +8.00 |
| Citizens Committee | James Donald | 13,085 | 43.27 | −0.16 |
| Labour | George Gordon Grant | 13,015 | 43.04 | +5.65 |
| Citizens Committee | Ellen Melville | 12,809 | 42.36 | +2.55 |
| Labour | Norman Douglas | 12,740 | 42.13 | |
| Citizens Committee | Harold Percy Burton | 12,729 | 42.09 | −3.03 |
| Labour | Frank Lark | 12,721 | 42.06 | |
| Citizens Committee | Alice Basten | 12,584 | 41.61 | ±0.00 |
| Labour | Jim Purtell | 12,478 | 41.26 | +4.34 |
| Labour | Paul Richardson | 12,430 | 41.10 | |
| Labour | Jack Lyon | 12,401 | 41.01 | |
| Labour | Charles Stephen Morris | 12,074 | 39.92 | +5.46 |
| Citizens Committee | Michael John Coyle | 11,876 | 39.27 | −2.63 |
| Citizens Committee | Sidney Takle | 11,754 | 38.87 | −0.94 |
| Labour | Hannah Harrison | 11,746 | 38.84 | |
| Labour | Harry Gordon Staley | 11,699 | 38.68 | |
| Citizens Committee | Matthew John Bennett | 11,647 | 38.51 | −2.79 |
| Citizens Committee | Christopher H. Furness | 11,603 | 38.37 | |
| Citizens Committee | George Grey Campbell | 11,496 | 38.01 | −9.26 |
| Citizens Committee | John Barr Patterson | 11,300 | 37.37 | −3.62 |
| Citizens Committee | John Walter Hollis | 10,918 | 36.10 | |
| Citizens Committee | Bryan Hislop Kingston | 10,521 | 34.79 | |
| Citizens Committee | Alan Monteith Doull | 9,554 | 31.59 | |
| Citizens Committee | George Cruickshank | 9,482 | 31.35 | |
| Citizens Committee | Augustus Charles Norden | 9,316 | 30.80 | |
| Citizens Committee | John W. Kealy | 9,263 | 30.63 | |
| Citizens Committee | David Henry | 9,190 | 30.39 | |
| Independent | Dawson Donaldson | 9,017 | 29.82 | −9.26 |
| Citizens Committee | Robert Gordon Slyfield | 8,805 | 29.11 | −3.43 |
| Citizens Committee | Herbert Tiarks | 8,034 | 26.56 | |
| Citizens Committee | George Frederick Lane | 7,717 | 25.52 | |
| Independent | John Lundon | 6,375 | 21.08 | −4.30 |
| Independent | Alfred Hall Skelton | 6,235 | 20.61 | |
| Independent | Isidor Meltzer | 6,235 | 20.61 | |
| Independent | Walter Harry Murray | 5,987 | 19.79 | −9.53 |
| Independent | William Henry Horton | 5,742 | 18.98 | |
| Independent | Arnold Ellis Ely | 5,328 | 17.62 | |
| Communist | Jim Edwards | 4,133 | 13.66 | |
| Communist | Alexander Drennan | 2,535 | 8.38 | |
| Communist | Henry Mornington Smith | 2,429 | 8.03 | |
| Independent | Maungatai Julia Babbington | 2,307 | 7.62 | |
| Independent | William James Crook | 2,266 | 7.49 | |
| Independent | Edward Thurlow Field | 1,947 | 6.43 | |
| Independent | James William Payne | 1,742 | 5.76 | |
