= 1927 Auckland City mayoral election =

New Zealand mayoral election

- 27 April 1927
- Turnout: 21,197 (51.93%)
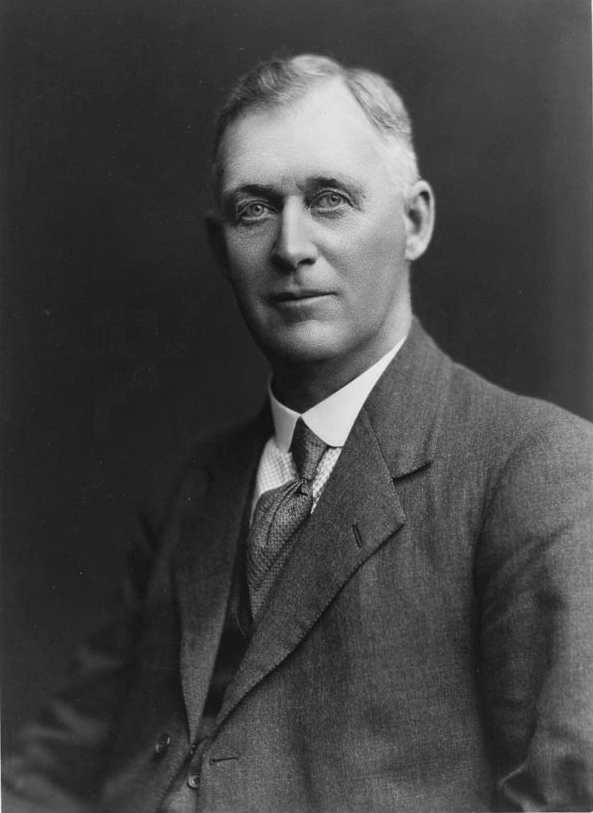

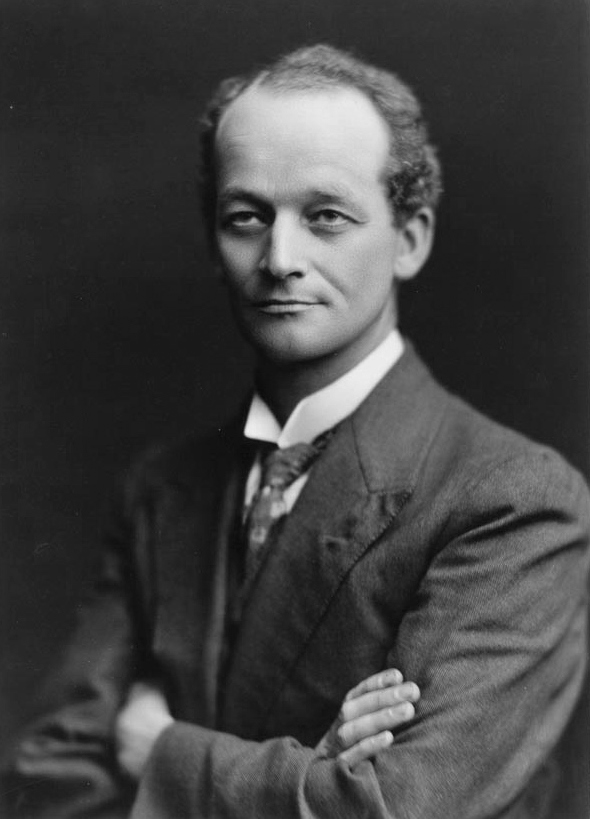
Candidate	George Baildon	Tom Bloodworth
Party	Progressive Citizens'	Labour
Popular vote	8,796	7,194
Percentage	41.49	33.93
Mayor before election
George Baildon
Elected mayor
George Baildon

The 1927 Auckland City mayoral election was part of the 1927 New Zealand local elections held that same year. In 1927, elections were held for the Mayor of Auckland plus other local government positions including twenty-one city councillors. The polling was conducted using the standard first-past-the-post electoral method.

== Mayoralty results ==
1927 Auckland mayoral election
Party	Candidate	Votes	%	±%
Progressive Citizens'	George Baildon	8,796	41.49	−20.66
Labour	Tom Bloodworth	7,194	33.93	
Independent	James Warnock	3,256	15.36	
Independent	Harold Schmidt	1,703	8.03	−29.82
Informal votes		248	1.16	
Majority		1,602	7.55	−16.75
Turnout		21,197	51.93	

== Councillor results ==
1927 Auckland local election
Party	Candidate	Votes	%	±%
Progressive Citizens'	Frederick Brinsden	8,838	51.69	
Progressive Citizens'	Andrew Entrican	8,675	50.92	−1.40
Progressive Citizens'	Matthew John Bennett	8,519	50.18	+4.39
Progressive Citizens'	John Dempsey	8,481	50.01	+0.08
Progressive Citizens'	Alfred Eady	8,407	49.66	−5.93
Independent	Ellen Melville	8,138	48.39	−2.35
Independent	John W. Court	7,871	47.13	−6.74
Progressive Citizens'	John Allum	7,797	46.78	−3.56
Progressive Citizens'	George Knight	7,563	45.67	−4.75
Labour	Ted Phelan	7,492	45.34	+13.61
Progressive Citizens'	Michael John Coyle	7,389	44.85	−0.98
Progressive Citizens'	John Barr Patterson	7,224	44.08	+2.86
Progressive Citizens'	Samuel Crookes	7,061	43.31	+3.48
Progressive Citizens'	James Donald	6,976	42.91	−2.63
Labour	George Davis	6,472	40.53	
Progressive Citizens'	George Ashley	6,369	40.04	
Independent	William Lang Casey	5,928	37.96	
Labour	Oscar McBrine	5,846	37.57	
Independent	Walter Harry Murray	5,788	37.30	
Progressive Citizens'	Alice Basten	5,726	37.01	+7.51
Progressive Citizens'	Arthur Stallworthy	5,696	36.87	
Progressive Citizens'	George Brownlee	5,668	36.73	−0.49
Independent	Alfred Hall Skelton	5,455	35.73	
Independent	George Grey Campbell	5,307	35.03	
Progressive Citizens'	Daniel Flynn	5,215	34.60	
Labour	Dick Barter	5,083	33.97	+4.05
Progressive Citizens'	Harry Jenkins	4,929	33.25	
Independent	Ewen William Alison	4,925	33.23	
Independent	Finlay McLiver	4,923	33.22	
Labour	Jim Purtell	4,874	32.99	
Labour	Arthur Rosser	4,789	32.59	
Independent	William James Potter	4,788	32.58	
Independent	Thomas McNab	4,765	32.47	
Labour	Jeremiah James Sullivan	4,596	31.68	
Independent	Alexander Eccles	4,587	31.63	
Independent	William Hugh McKinney	4,461	31.04	−0.51
Labour	Hector James Sutherland	4,432	30.90	+4.16
Labour	Charles Stephen Morris	4,299	30.28	
Labour	Charles Arthur Watts	4,276	30.17	+4.49
Independent	John Lundon	4,112	29.39	
Labour	Bernard Martin	3,995	28.84	+6.65
Labour	Bernard Clews	3,922	28.50	+4.84
Independent	George Leonard Brett	3,841	28.12	
Independent	John Brockie King	3,668	27.30	
Labour	William Edward Sill	3,488	26.45	
Independent	Martha Schmidt	3,404	26.05	
Independent	John Francis Shanly	3,389	25.98	
Independent	Dick Thompson	3,355	25.82	−10.43
Independent	H. Oakley Browne	3,284	25.49	
Progressive Citizens'	Wilfred Skegg	3,154	24.87	
Progressive Citizens'	William Henry Nagle	2,916	23.75	
Independent	George Rochester Metcalfe	2,847	23.43	+8.24
Independent	Percy McElwain	2,720	22.83	
Independent	Samuel Turkington	2,685	22.66	
Independent	Hallyburton Johnstone	2,630	22.40	−9.99
Independent	Walter Glover	2,268	20.69	+3.67
Progressive Citizens'	Thomas Clinton Pow	2,207	20.41	
Independent	Sydney Brown	2,104	19.92	
Independent	George Herbert Guy	1,618	17.63	
Labour	Bill Schramm	1,419	16.69	
Independent	Basil Howse	1,362	16.42	
