= 1931 Auckland City mayoral election =

New Zealand mayoral election

- 8 May 1931
- Turnout: 21,634 (44.87%)
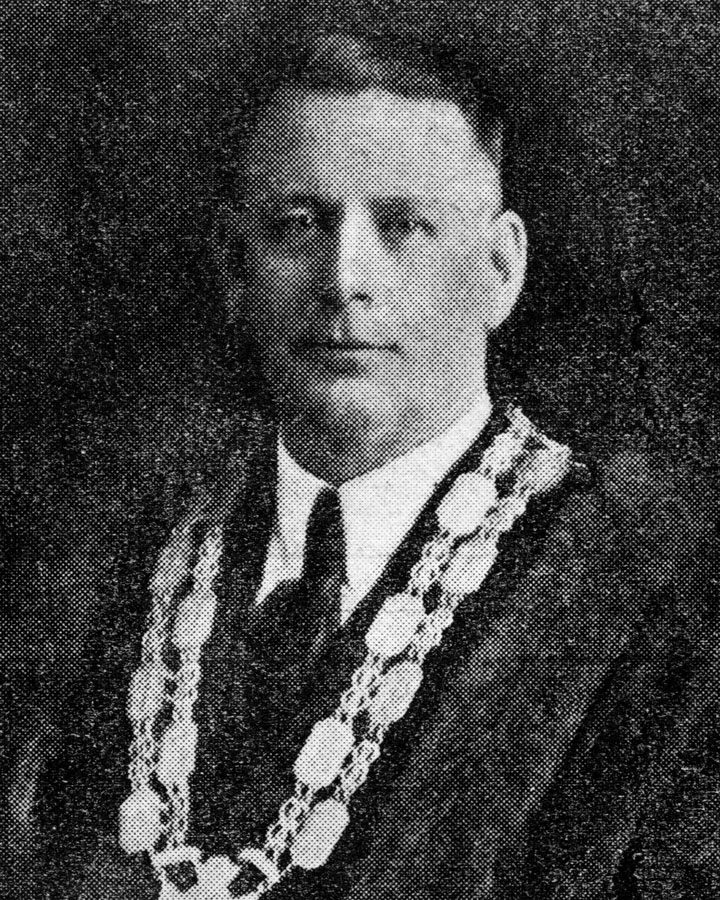

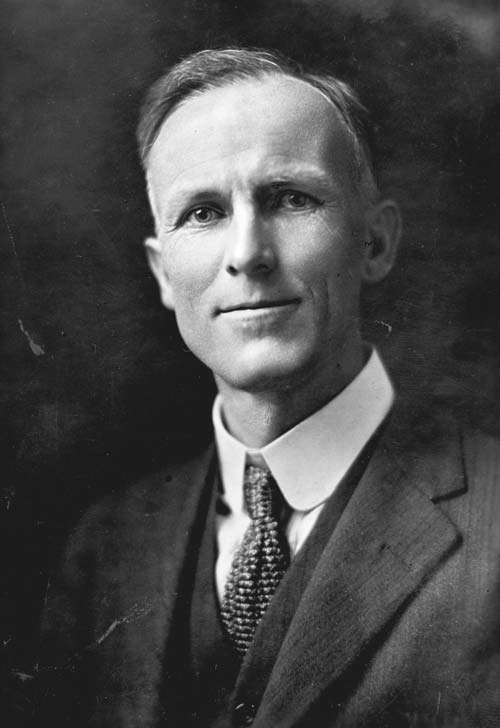
Candidate	George Hutchison	Rex Mason
Party	Citizens Committee	Labour
Popular vote	12,799	8,598
Percentage	59.16	39.74
Mayor before election
George Baildon
Elected mayor
George Hutchison

The 1931 Auckland City mayoral election was part of the New Zealand local elections held that same year. In 1931, elections were held for the Mayor of Auckland plus other local government positions including twenty-one city councillors. The polling was conducted using the standard first-past-the-post electoral method.

== Mayoralty results ==
1931 Auckland mayoral election
Party	Candidate	Votes	%	±%
Citizens Committee	George Hutchison	12,799	59.16	
Labour	Rex Mason	8,598	39.74	
Informal votes		237	1.09	−0.17
Majority		4,201	19.41	
Turnout		21,634	44.87	

== Councillor results ==
1931 Auckland local election
Party	Candidate	Votes	%	±%
Citizens Committee	George Grey Campbell	11,966	55.31	+26.01
Citizens Committee	Harold Percy Burton	11,371	52.56	+27.71
Citizens Committee	Dawson Donaldson	11,029	50.97	+26.63
Citizens Committee	Leonard Coakley	10,902	50.39	
Citizens Committee	Andrew Entrican	10,659	49.26	+13.83
Citizens Committee	Harry Jenkins	10,571	48.86	
Citizens Committee	James Robertson	10,510	48.58	
Citizens Committee	Matthew John Bennett	10,440	48.25	+17.60
Citizens Committee	Michael John Coyle	10,367	47.91	+22.66
Citizens Committee	Francis Leonard	10,298	47.60	
Independent	Tom Bloodworth	10,241	47.33	−2.94
Citizens Committee	Ellen Melville	10,179	47.05	+17.88
Labour	Ted Phelan	10,169	47.00	+14.94
Independent	John Barr Patterson	9,929	45.89	+20.55
Citizens Committee	Alice Basten	9,902	45.77	+17.15
Independent	Walter Harry Murray	9,525	44.02	+6.73
Citizens Committee	Gideon Lawrence Taylor	9,367	43.29	
Labour	Fred Bartram	9,215	42.59	+12.67
Independent	James Donald	8,975	41.48	+12.16
Citizens Committee	David Henry	8,879	41.04	
Labour	Bernard Martin	8,501	39.29	+23.63
Citizens Committee	Robert Gracie Milligan	8,441	39.01	
Independent	George McKendrick	8,351	38.60	
Independent	George Brownlee	8,341	38.55	+8.76
Labour	John Thomas Jennings	8,319	38.45	+22.61
Citizens Committee	John Allum	8,100	37.44	+13.38
Independent	William Lang Casey	8,072	37.31	+7.64
Citizens Committee	Harold Tahana Thomas	7,903	36.53	
Citizens Committee	Herbert Bellam	7,867	36.36	+16.20
Independent	John Lundon	7,799	36.04	+8.93
Labour	Arthur Rosser	7,568	34.98	
Labour	Ernest Frank Andrews	7,545	34.87	
Labour	Charles Arthur Watts	7,231	33.42	
Labour	Joe Sayegh	6,548	30.26	
Labour	Gordon Hultquist	6,345	29.32	
