= 1923 Auckland City mayoral election =

New Zealand mayoral election

- 26 April 1923
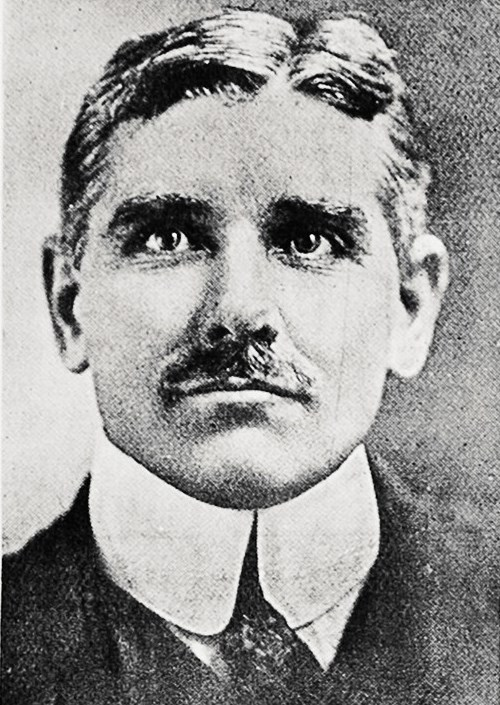
Candidate	James Gunson
Party	Progressive Citizens'
Popular vote	unopposed
Mayor before election
James Gunson
Elected mayor
James Gunson

The 1923 Auckland City mayoral election was part of the New Zealand local elections held that same year. In 1923, elections were held for the Mayor of Auckland plus other local government positions including twenty-one city councillors. The polling was conducted using the standard first-past-the-post electoral method.

Incumbent mayor James Gunson was again declared re-elected unopposed, with no other candidates emerging.

== Councillor results ==
1923 Auckland local election
Party	Candidate	Votes	%	±%
Progressive Citizens'	George Baildon	6,281	72.67	+13.52
Progressive Citizens'	George Knight	5,775	66.81	+3.70
Progressive Citizens'	James Alexander Warnock	5,741	66.30	+0.35
Progressive Citizens'	George R. Hutchison	5,675	65.31	−8.05
Labour	Tom Bloodworth	5,618	64.45	+14.27
Progressive Citizens'	John William Hardley	5,595	64.11	+1.76
Progressive Citizens'	John Allum	5,489	62.51	−4.06
Progressive Citizens'	Andrew Entrican	5,484	62.44	
Progressive Citizens'	Matthew John Bennett	5,427	61.58	+1.11
Progressive Citizens'	John Dempsey	5,330	60.12	+1.40
Progressive Citizens'	Frederick Brinsden	5,157	57.52	+9.41
Progressive Citizens'	James Donald	4,949	54.39	
Progressive Citizens'	John Barr Paterson	4,896	53.60	−4.12
Progressive Citizens'	Thomas Garland	4,893	53.61	
Progressive Citizens'	Dick Thompson	4,765	51.63	
Progressive Citizens'	Ellen Melville	4,757	51.51	−15.27
Progressive Citizens'	Christopher H. Furness	4,757	51.51	
Independent	Charles MacIndoe	4,634	49.66	
Progressive Citizens'	Samuel Crookes	4,614	53.38	
Progressive Citizens'	Aldred Edwin Lawry	4,555	52.70	
Progressive Citizens'	James Robertson	4,541	48.26	−6.09
Progressive Citizens'	George Russell Magee	3,768	36.64	
Labour	Oscar McBrine	3,588	33.93	+3.28
Labour	Bernard Martin	3,471	32.17	+7.52
Labour	Ted Phelan	3,446	31.80	−2.48
Labour	Dick Barter	3,418	31.38	−4.49
Independent	Daniel Flynn	3,248	28.82	
Independent	Alfred Hall-Skelton	3,148	27.32	−18.17
Labour	Charles Arthur Watts	3,027	25.50	−0.45
Labour	Jim Purtell	3,001	25.11	−0.76
Labour	Pat Hickey	2,578	18.75	
Independent	Frederick Coles Jordan	2,556	18.42	
Labour	Bernard Clews	2,417	16.33	−7.34
Labour	William Moxsom	2,378	15.74	−7.20
Labour	Arthur Shapton Richards	2,302	14.60	
Independent	John Henry Hannan	1,844	7.72	
Independent	Walter Glover	1,510	2.69	
