= 1925 Auckland City mayoral election =

New Zealand mayoral election

- 29 April 1925
- Turnout: 15,003
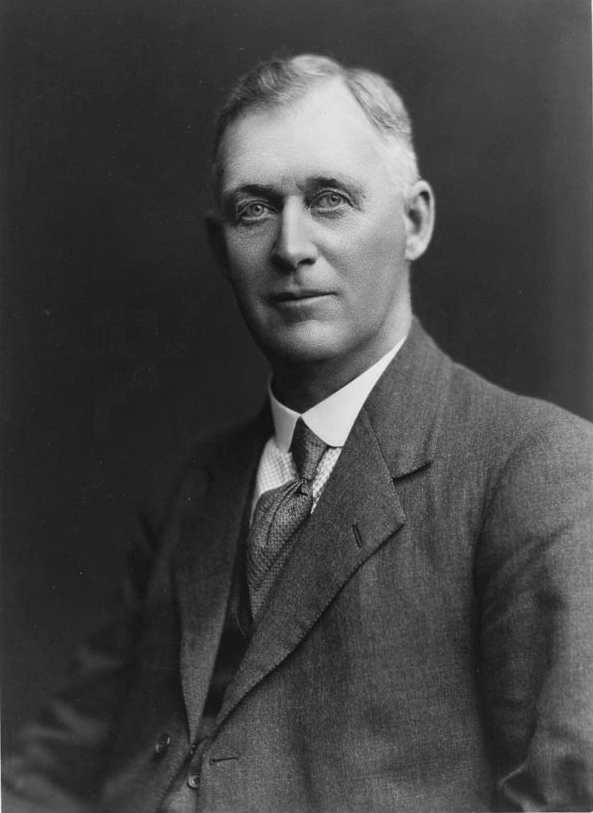

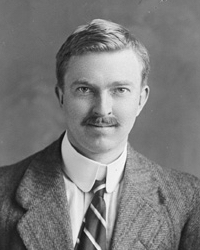
Candidate	George Baildon	Harold Schmidt
Party	Progressive Citizens'	Independent
Popular vote	9,325	5,678
Percentage	62.15	37.85
Mayor before election
James Gunson
Elected mayor
George Baildon

The 1925 Auckland City mayoral election was part of the New Zealand local elections held that same year. In 1925, elections were held for the Mayor of Auckland plus other local government positions including twenty-one city councillors. The polling was conducted using the standard first-past-the-post electoral method.

== Background ==
As part of the elections, ratepayers voted on loan schemes to the value of £ NZ750,000, the largest of which (£ NZ340,000) was for the proposed Auckland Civic Centre. The Auckland Civic Centre was supported by the outgoing mayor and those city councillors who stood for re-election, plus George Baildon who won the mayoralty. Baildon's opponent, Harold Schmidt, was an opponent of the loan. The voters were happy to support those candidates who supported the scheme but they did not approve the loan and the scheme did not go ahead.

== Mayoralty results ==
1925 Auckland mayoral election
Party	Candidate	Votes	%	±%
Progressive Citizens'	George Baildon	9,325	62.15	
Independent	Harold Schmidt	5,678	37.85	
Majority		3,647	24.30	
Turnout		15,003		

== Councillor results ==
1925 Auckland City Council election
Party	Candidate	Votes	%	±%
Labour	Tom Bloodworth	8,862	59.06	−5.39
Progressive Citizens'	John W. Court	8,083	53.87	
Progressive Citizens'	James Warnock	7,888	52.57	−13.73
Progressive Citizens'	Andrew Entrican	7,851	52.32	−10.12
Progressive Citizens'	Ellen Melville	7,614	50.74	−0.77
Progressive Citizens'	George Knight	7,565	50.42	−16.39
Progressive Citizens'	John Allum	7,553	50.34	−12.17
Progressive Citizens'	John Dempsey	7,491	49.93	−10.19
Progressive Citizens'	John William Hardley	7,286	48.56	−15.55
Progressive Citizens'	Matthew John Bennett	6,871	45.79	−15.79
Progressive Citizens'	Charles Frederick Bennett	6,851	45.66	
Progressive Citizens'	Michael John Coyle	6,583	43.87	
Progressive Citizens'	Alfred Eady	6,561	43.73	
Progressive Citizens'	James Donald	6,383	42.54	−11.85
Progressive Citizens'	John Barr Patterson	6,185	41.22	−12.38
Progressive Citizens'	James Robertson	6,185	41.22	−7.04
Progressive Citizens'	Samuel Crookes	5,976	39.83	−13.55
Progressive Citizens'	Frederick Brinsden	5,819	38.78	−18.74
Progressive Citizens'	George Brownlee	5,585	37.22	
Progressive Citizens'	Dick Thompson	5,440	36.25	−15.38
Labour	Ted Phelan	4,761	31.73	−0.07
Progressive Citizens'	William Hugh McKinney	4,734	31.55	
Labour	Dick Barter	4,490	29.92	−1.46
Progressive Citizens'	Harold Clement Jones	4,452	29.67	
Independent	Alice Basten	4,427	29.50	
Labour	Hector James Sutherland	4,013	26.74	
Labour	Charles Arthur Watts	3,854	25.68	+0.18
Independent	Harry Jenkins	3,684	24.55	
Independent	John Furness	3,656	24.36	
Independent	Alfred Coutts	3,650	24.32	
Labour	Bernard Clews	3,550	23.66	+7.33
Labour	Frederick Cox	3,534	23.55	
Labour	William Moxsom	3,384	22.55	+6.81
Labour	Bernard Martin	3,330	22.19	−9.98
Labour	Samuel Richard Goodman	3,051	20.33	
Independent	Thomas Leopold Thompson	2,830	18.86	
Independent	Frederick David Parsons	2,593	17.28	
Independent	Walter Howard Dawson	2,549	16.98	
Independent	Walter Glover	2,554	17.02	+14.33
Independent	George Metcalfe	2,280	15.19	
Independent	Daniel Bradley	2,218	14.78	
Independent	Hallyburton Johnstone	1,862	12.41	
Independent	Samuel Zobel	1,690	11.26	
Independent	Alexander Troup	1,565	10.43	
