= 1933 Auckland City mayoral election =

New Zealand mayoral election

- 4 May 1933
- Turnout: 21,327 (48.78%)
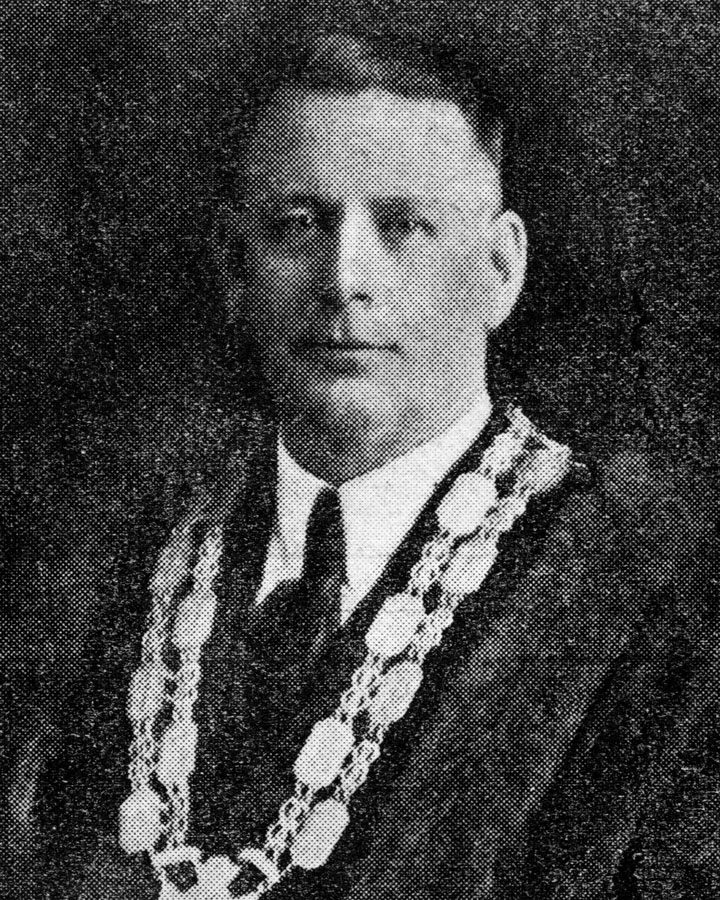

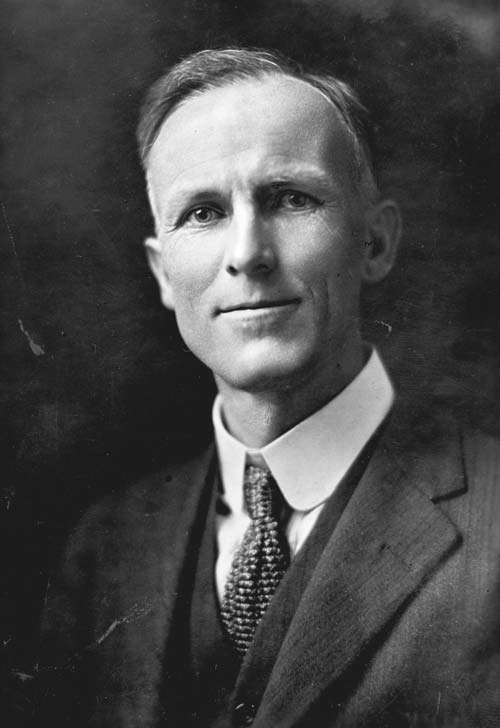
Candidate	George Hutchison	Rex Mason
Party	Citizens Committee	Labour
Popular vote	10,651	10,209
Percentage	49.94	47.86
Mayor before election
George Hutchison
Elected mayor
George Hutchison

The 1933 Auckland City mayoral election was part of the New Zealand local elections held that same year. In 1933, elections were held for the Mayor of Auckland plus other local government positions including twenty-one city councillors. The polling was conducted using the standard first-past-the-post electoral method.

== Mayoralty results ==
1933 Auckland mayoral election
Party	Candidate	Votes	%	±%
Citizens Committee	George Hutchison	10,651	49.94	−9.22
Labour	Rex Mason	10,209	47.86	+8.12
Informal votes		467	2.18	+1.09
Majority		442	2.07	−17.34
Turnout		21,327	48.78	+3.91

== Councillor results ==
1933 Auckland local election
Party	Candidate	Votes	%	±%
Labour	Ted Phelan	10,286	48.22	+1.22
Citizens Committee	George Grey Campbell	10,082	47.27	−8.04
Citizens Committee	Andrew Entrican	9,827	46.07	−3.19
Citizens Committee	Leonard Coakley	9,746	45.69	−4.70
Citizens Committee	Harold Percy Burton	9,623	45.12	−7.44
Citizens Committee	James Donald	9,263	43.43	−1.95
Labour	John Albert Mason	9,241	43.33	
Labour	Joe Sayegh	9,217	43.21	+12.95
Citizens Committee	Michael John Coyle	8,937	41.90	+6.01
Independent	Tom Bloodworth	8,900	41.73	+47.33
Citizens Committee	Alice Basten	8,875	41.61	−4.16
Citizens Committee	Matthew John Bennett	8,809	41.30	−6.95
Citizens Committee	John Barr Patterson	8,744	40.99	−4.90
Labour	Bill Anderton	8,702	40.80	
Labour	Ernest Frank Andrews	8,614	40.39	+5.52
Labour	Charles Bailey	8,607	40.35	
Citizens Committee	Ellen Melville	8,492	39.81	−7.24
Citizens Committee	Sidney Takle	8,492	39.81	
Labour	John William Yarnall	8,404	39.40	
Citizens Committee	Dawson Donaldson	8,335	39.08	−11.89
Labour	Arthur Rosser	8,312	38.97	+3.99
Labour	Mollie Lee	8,083	37.90	
Labour	George Gordon Grant	7,976	37.39	
Citizens Committee	Gideon Lawrence Taylor	7,935	37.20	−6.09
Labour	Jim Purtell	7,874	36.92	
Citizens Committee	Alan Brown	7,825	36.69	
Citizens Committee	Michael Joseph Moodabe	7,779	36.47	
Labour	John Stewart	7,656	35.89	
Labour	Bernard Martin	7,648	35.86	−3.43
Labour	John Thomas Jennings	7,569	35.49	−2.96
Citizens Committee	Ernest Robert Boucher	7,364	34.52	
Labour	Charles Stephen Morris	7,350	34.46	
Citizens Committee	David Henry	7,338	34.40	−6.64
Labour	Frederick Ernest Martin	7,282	34.14	
Labour	Gordon Hultquist	7,121	33.38	+4.06
Labour	George Marten	7,088	33.23	
Citizens Committee	Robert Gordon Slyfield	6,940	32.54	
Citizens Committee	George McKendrick	6,927	32.47	−6.13
Independent	Walter Harry Murray	6,254	29.32	−14.70
Citizens Committee	William Francis O'Donnell	6,160	28.88	
Independent	John Lundon	5,510	25.83	−10.21
Independent	Francis Leonard	2,508	11.75	−35.85
Communist	Gordon Harvey Dale	2,380	11.15	
