= 23rd New Zealand Parliament =

Term of the Parliament of New Zealand

23rd Parliament of New Zealand
←	22nd Parliament	24th Parliament	→
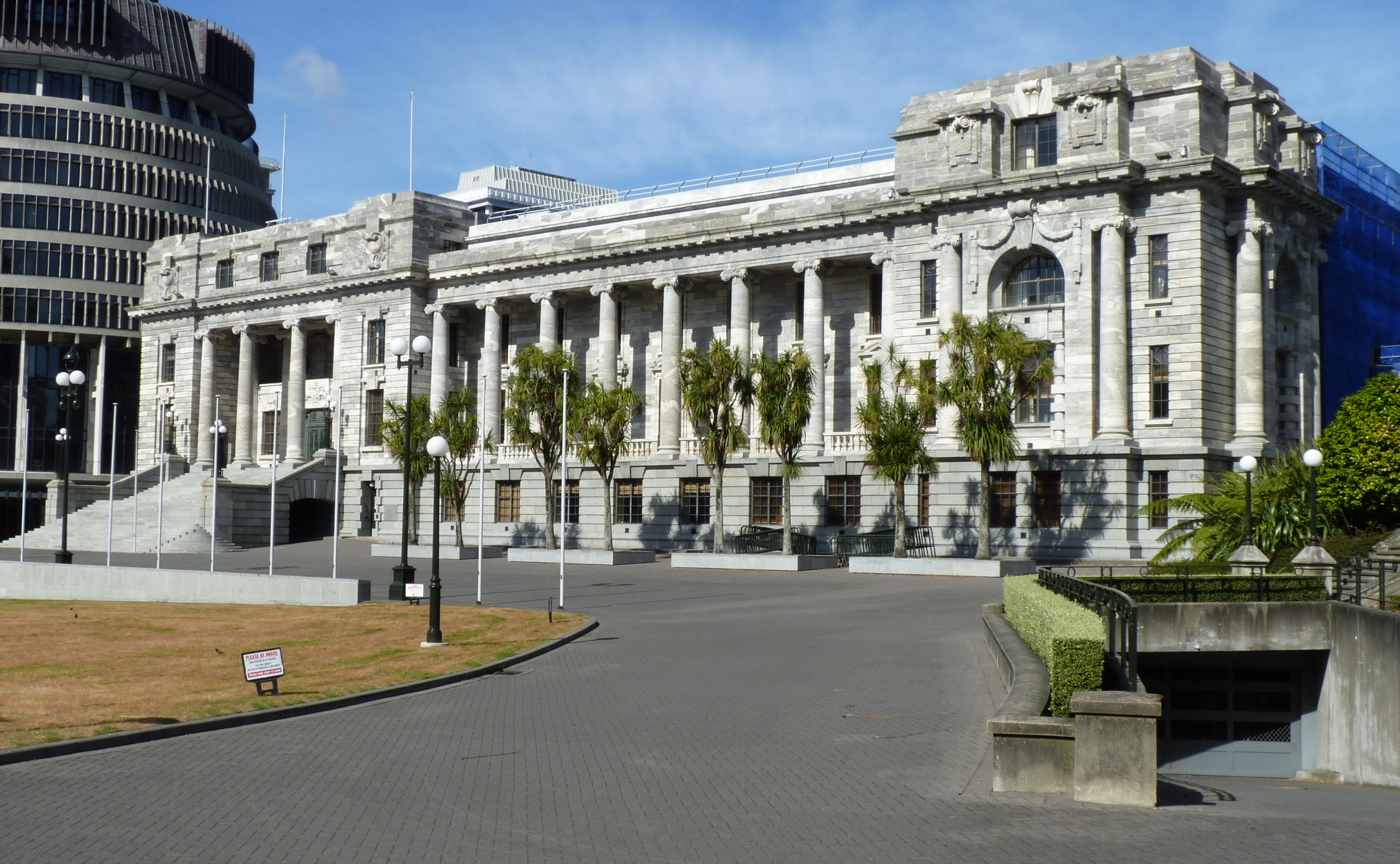
- Parliament House, Wellington

Overview
- Legislative body: New Zealand Parliament
- Term: 4 December 1928 – 11 November 1931
- Election: 1928 New Zealand general election
- Government: United Government — Reform Government until 10 December 1928

House of Representatives
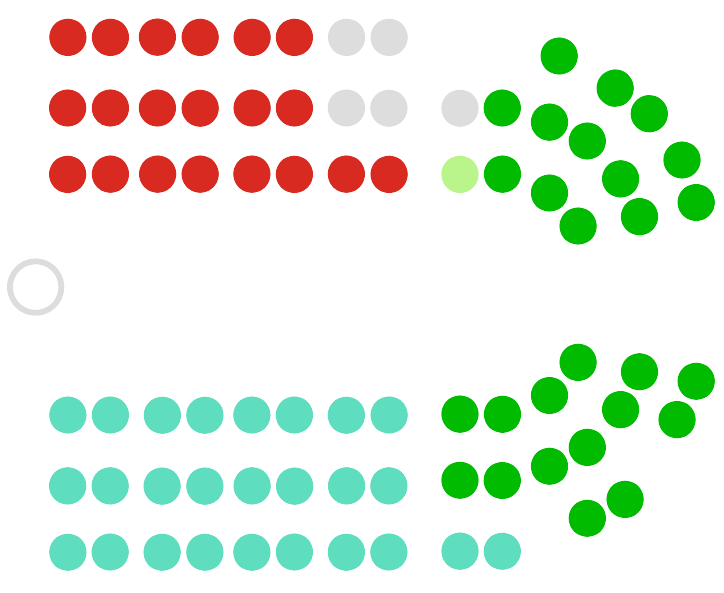
- Members: 80
- Speaker of the House: Charles Statham
- Prime Minister: George Forbes — Joseph Ward until 28 May 1930 — Gordon Coates until 10 December 1928
- Leader of the Opposition: Harry Holland — Gordon Coates until 22 September 1931 — Joseph Ward until 10 December 1928

Legislative Council
- Members: 41 (at start); 35 (at end)
- Speaker of the Council: Sir Walter Carncross
- Leader of the Council: Sir Thomas Sidey — Sir Francis Bell until 10 December 1928

Sovereign
- Monarch: HM George V
- Governor-General: HE Rt. Hon. THe Lord Bledisloe from 19 March 1930 — HE Gen. Sir Charles Fergusson until 8 February 1930

The 23rd New Zealand Parliament was a term of the New Zealand Parliament. It was elected at the 1928 general election in November of that year.

== 1928 general election ==
The 1928 general election was held on Tuesday, 13 November in the Māori electorates and on Wednesday, 14 November in the general electorates, respectively. A total of 80 MPs were elected; 47 represented North Island electorates, 29 represented South Island electorates, and the remaining four represented Māori electorates. 844,633 voters were enrolled and the official turnout at the election was 88.1%.

== Electoral boundaries ==
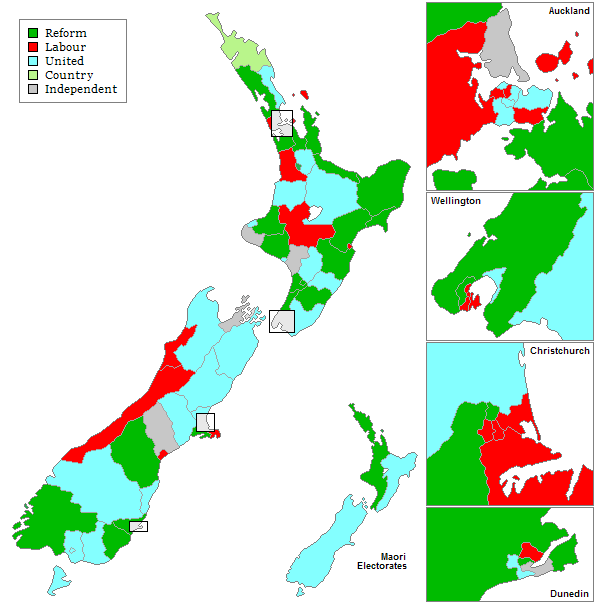

== Sessions ==
The 23rd Parliament sat for five sessions (there were two sessions in 1931), and was prorogued on 12 November 1931.

Session	Opened	Adjourned
first	4 December 1928	14 December 1928
second	27 June 1929	9 November 1929
third	26 June 1930	25 October 1930
fourth	11 March 1931	28 April 1931
fifth	25 June 1931	11 November 1931

== Party standings ==
=== Start of Parliament ===
Party	Leader(s)	Seats at start
United Party	Sir Joseph Ward	27
Reform Party	Gordon Coates	27
Labour Party	Harry Holland	19
Country Party	Harold Rushworth	1
Independents		6

=== End of Parliament ===
Party	Leader(s)	Seats at end
Reform Party	Gordon Coates	27
United Party	George Forbes	26
Labour Party	Harry Holland	20
Country Party	Harold Rushworth	1
Independents		6

== Ministries ==
The Coates Ministry led by Gordon Coates of the Reform Party had come to power in May 1925. The Reform Party lost the 1928 election, suffering a humiliating defeat, dropping from 55 seats in 1925 to 28 only three years later. Parliament was called shortly after the election, Coates lost a no confidence vote and resigned as Prime Minister.

Joseph Ward formed the second Ward Ministry on 10 December 1928 as leader of the United Party, a successor of the Liberal Party. Ward was an unwell man at this stage in life and suffered several heart attacks. In May 1930, he was pressured by his colleagues to resign as Prime Minister.

Ward was succeeded by George Forbes, again of the United Party. The Forbes Ministry was in place until September 1931. During the difficult times of the Great Depression, Forbes wanted to form a grand coalition with the Labour Party and the Reform Party. Labour refused, but Reform went into a coalition government with United from September 1931.

== Members ==
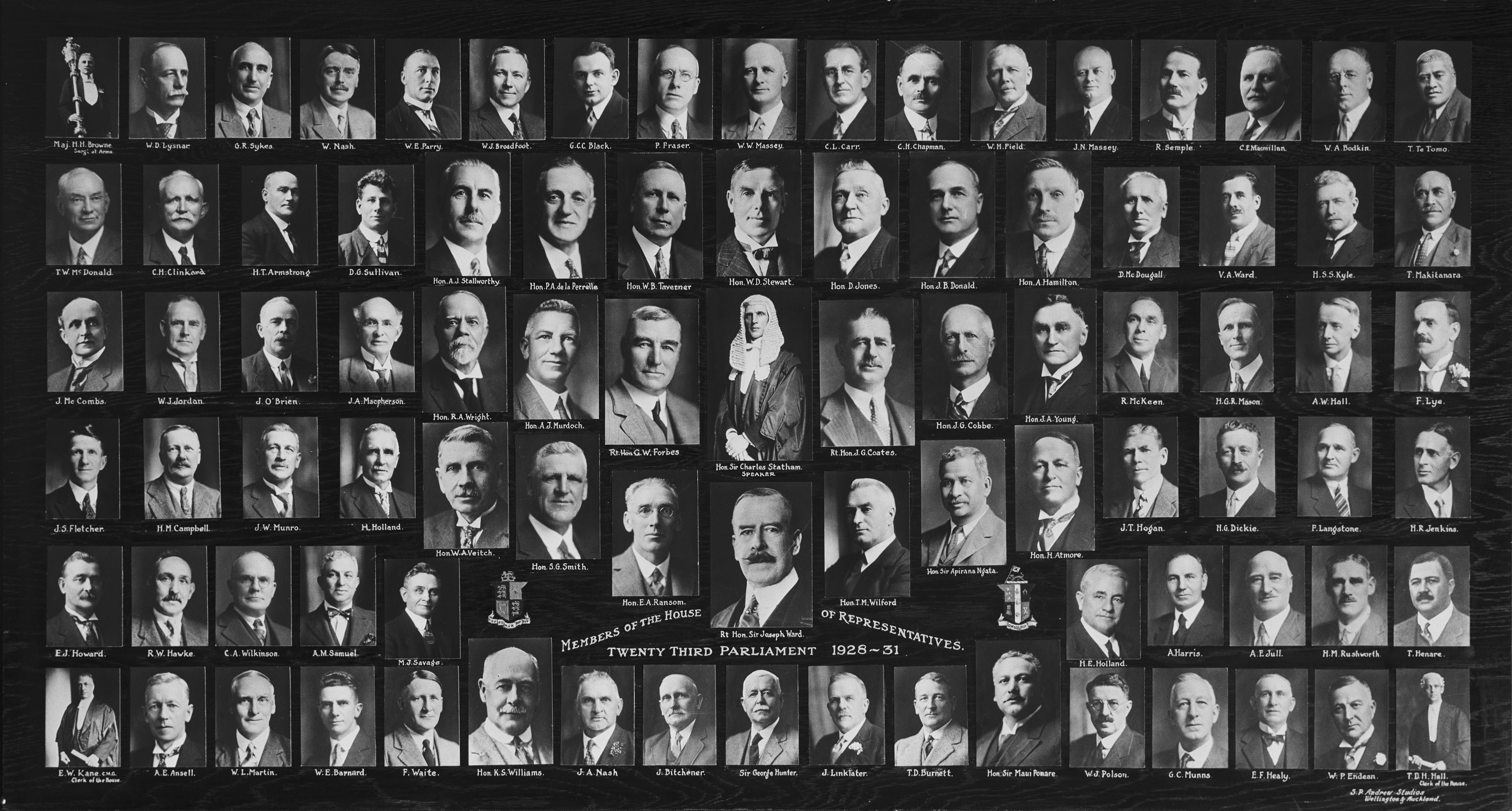
Members of the House of Representatives, Parliament of New Zealand, 1928–1931.

=== Initial MPs ===
Key

United Reform Labour Country Party Liberal–Labour Ratana Independent

Electorate results for the 1928 New Zealand general election
Electorate	Incumbent	Winner	Majority	Runner up
General electorates
Auckland Central	Bill Parry		3,024	William Hewitt
Auckland East	John A. Lee	James Donald	37	John A. Lee
Auckland Suburbs	New electorate	Rex Mason	1,098	Sir James Gunson
Auckland West	Michael Joseph Savage		1,341	Richard Speirs
Avon	Dan Sullivan		3,845	George Thomas Baker
Awarua	John Hamilton	Philip De La Perrelle	1,005	John Hamilton
Bay of Islands	Allen Bell	Harold Rushworth	2	Allen Bell
Bay of Plenty	Kenneth Williams		1,867	Alexander Moncur
Buller	Harry Holland		3,617	Dugald Macdonald Robertson
Central Otago	New electorate	William Bodkin	653	James Ritchie
Chalmers	James Dickson	Alfred Ansell	619	Norman Hartley Campbell
Christchurch East	Tim Armstrong		2,260	Denis Franklyn Dennehy
Christchurch North	Henry Holland		1,892	Ernest Andrews
Christchurch South	Ted Howard		433	Charlie McCully
Clutha	Fred Waite		523	Joseph Stephens
Dunedin Central	Sir Charles Statham		1,771	John Robinson
Dunedin North	Harold Tapley	Jim Munro	1,231	Harold Tapley
Dunedin South	Thomas Sidey	William Taverner	33	Robert William Hall
Dunedin West	Downie Stewart		1,277	Cornelius Machin Moss
Eden	Rex Mason	Arthur Stallworthy	2,436	Vivian Potter
Egmont	Oswald Hawken	Charles Wilkinson	1,286	Oswald Hawken
Franklin	Ewen McLennan	Jack Massey	134	Harry Mellsop
Gisborne	Douglas Lysnar	Douglas Lysnar (Ind R)	346	David Coleman
Grey Lynn	Fred Bartram	John Fletcher	64	Fred Bartram
Hamilton	Alexander Young		1,073	Samuel Charles Gale Lye
Hauraki	New electorate	Arthur Hall	891	Ebenezer Allan
Hawke's Bay	Hugh Campbell		690	Jack Lyon
Hurunui	George Forbes		1,839	Leslie Robert Cathcart Macfarlane
Hutt	Thomas Wilford		1,305	Walter Nash
Invercargill	Sir Joseph Ward, Bt.		3,178	Morell Macalister
Kaiapoi	David Buddo	Richard Hawke	96	James Arthur Flesher
Kaipara	Gordon Coates		2,475	Jim Barclay
Lyttelton	James McCombs		1,867	John Beanland
Manawatu	Joseph Linklater		1,466	Patrick James Small
Manukau	Bill Jordan		3,659	Kells Mason
Marsden	William Jones	Alfred Murdoch	450	William Jones
Masterton	George Sykes		1,238	William Thompson
Mataura	George Anderson	David McDougall	62	George Anderson
Mid-Canterbury	New electorate	David Jones	55	Jeremiah Connolly
Motueka	Richard Hudson	George Black	613	Richard Hudson
Napier	John Mason	Bill Barnard	418	John Mason
Nelson	Harry Atmore		2,309	Frederick William Oscar Smith
New Plymouth	New electorate	Sydney Smith	1,467	Charles Bellringer
Oamaru	Ernest Lee	John Macpherson	337	Ernest Lee
Oroua	John Eliott	John Cobbe	732	John Eliott
Otaki	William Field		813	Archie Sievwright
Pahiatua	Alfred Ransom		922	Harold Smith
Palmerston	Jimmy Nash		2,350	Walter Bromley
Parnell	James S. Dickson	Harry Jenkins	849	James S. Dickson
Patea	Harold Dickie		182	James Douglas Hislop
Raglan	Lee Martin		1,041	Walter Seavill
Rangitikei	Billy Glenn	James Hogan	1,234	Billy Glenn
Riccarton	Bert Kyle		45	Archibald Albany McLachlan
Roskill	Vivian Potter	George Munns	2,344	Arthur Richards
Rotorua	Frank Hockly	Cecil Clinkard	200	Frank Hockly
Stratford	Edward Walter	William Polson	982	Edward Walter
Tauranga	Charles Macmillan		678	Douglas Charles Chalmers
Temuka	Thomas Burnett		86	Thomas Herbert Langford
Thames	Thomas Rhodes	Albert Samuel	1,302	John Sommerville Montgomerie
Timaru	Frank Rolleston	Clyde Carr	467	Frank Rolleston
Waikato	Stewart Reid	Frederick Lye	86	Stewart Reid
Waimarino	Robert Smith	Frank Langstone	985	Robert Smith
Waipawa	Sir George Hunter		1,860	Ernest Albert Goodger
Wairarapa	Alex McLeod	Thomas McDonald	566	Alex McLeod
Wairau	William Girling	Edward Healy	292	William Girling
Waitaki	John Bitchener		1,202	Frederick Cooke
Waitemata	Alexander Harris		315	Reginald Greville
Waitomo	John Rolleston	Walter Broadfoot	532	John Rolleston
Wallace	Adam Hamilton		20	Walter Taylor
Wanganui	Bill Veitch		2,137	Bill Rogers
Wellington Central	Peter Fraser		3,458	Dunbar Sloane
Wellington East	Thomas Forsyth	Bob Semple	966	Thomas Forsyth
Wellington North	Sir John Luke	Charles Chapman	47	Sir John Luke
Wellington South	Robert McKeen		2,953	Martin Luckie
Wellington Suburbs	Robert Wright		1,985	Tom Brindle
Westland	Tom Seddon	James O'Brien	185	Tom Seddon
Māori electorates
Eastern Maori	Sir Āpirana Ngata		3,104	Pita Moko
Northern Maori	Taurekareka Henare		880	Paraire Karaka Paikea
Southern Maori	Henare Uru	Tuiti Makitanara	1	Eruera Tirikatene
Western Maori	Sir Māui Pōmare		1,599	Toko Ratana

=== By-elections during 23rd Parliament ===
There were a number of changes during the term of the 23rd Parliament.

Electorate and by-election		Date	Incumbent	Cause	Winner
Bay of Islands	1929	10 April	Harold Rushworth	Election declared void	Harold Rushworth
Hutt	1929	18 December	Thomas Wilford	Resignation	Walter Nash
Parnell	1930	7 May	Harry Jenkins	Resignation	Bill Endean
Invercargill	1930	13 August	Sir Joseph Ward	Death	Vincent Ward
Waipawa	1930	8 October	Sir George Hunter	Death	Albert Jull
Western Maori	1930	8 October	Sir Māui Pōmare	Death	Taite Te Tomo
Hauraki	1931	27 May	Arthur Hall	Death	Walter Massey
