= 1930 Parnell by-election =

New Zealand by-election

- 7 May 1930
- Turnout: 86.54%
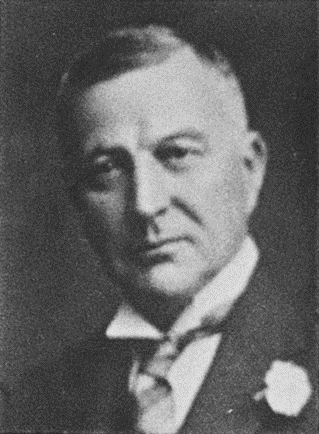

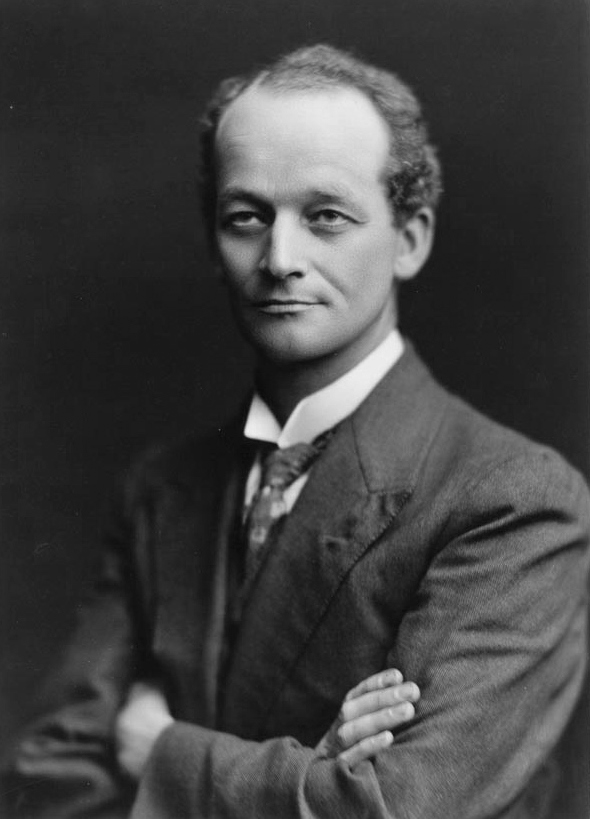
Candidate	Bill Endean	W. Alan Donald	Tom Bloodworth
Party	Reform	United	Labour
Popular vote	4,852	3,230	2,122
Member before election
Harry Reginald Jenkins
Independent
Elected Member
Bill Endean
Reform

The Parnell by-election of 1930 was a by-election in the seat of Parnell held on 7 May 1930 during the 23rd New Zealand Parliament. The by-election came about because of the resignation of the current member of parliament Harry Reginald Jenkins who chose to re-contest his seat. The seat was won by Bill Endean of the Reform Party.

== Results at general election ==
1928 general election: Parnell
Party	Candidate	Votes	%	±%
United	Harry Reginald Jenkins	5,642	46.64	
Reform	James Samuel Dickson	4,793	39.62	
Labour	John Yarnall	1,661	13.73	
Majority		849	7.02	
Informal votes		83	0.68	
Turnout		12,179	86.54	
Registered electors		14,073		

The election of Jenkins was considered a surprise. Dickson had held the seat 1911 but the Reform Party (New Zealand) suffered significant losses in this election.

== Cause of by-election ==
Jenkins was a big supporter of Gordon Coates who was the Prime Minister and leader of the Reform Party before 1928. However, at that election the United and Reform parties won an equal number of seats and the United party formed a coalition with Labour. Therefore, Joseph Ward became prime minister. Jenkins was critical of the deal United had done with Labour and so quit the party and became an independent. On 21 March, he then announced that he would resign from the electorate and contest the by-election. This was a controversial move but Michael Joseph Savage believed that he had done the "right thing".

== Selection process ==
=== Reform ===
Jenkins, after resigning, decided to join the Reform party and announced that he would try and win selection as their candidate. He said "I feel also that Reform is the safest of the three parties, because Reform will never be dictated to by Labour as the United Party has been." He also stated that he would not run as an independent if he was not selected. There were four Reform nominations for the seat, these were: R. Glover, Jenkins, Bill Endean and James Samuel Dickson. Endean was eventually selected.

=== Labour ===
Many different candidates were suspected to be involved in the selection process for labour. Among them were Tom Bloodworth who had run for this seat in the 1919 election, and Yarnall who had run at the previous election. Auckland City Councillor Ted Phelan likewise declined to seek nomination. Yarnall, however, eventually declined to run and Bloodworth won the nomination from Mary Dreaver.

=== United ===
W. Alan Donald was selected as the United candidate.

=== Others ===
W. C. Hewitt originally announced that he would stand as a Liberal-Labour candidate but did not do so. A. Fletcher intended to stand in the interests of the unemployed. These two candidates did not actually compete in the by-election.

== Campaign ==
The election was seen as a judgement on whether or not United supporters agreed with their deal with Labour. Donald spoke in defence of his party's record, claimed that a loss for his party could cause an election and that a small surplus would be announced in the budget.

Bloodworth said that Labour would introduce real measures which would bring about real changes to New Zealand.

Endean was heavily favoured to win after receiving an endorsement by the New Zealand Truth.

== Result ==
The following table gives the election results:

1930 Parnell by-election
Party	Candidate	Votes	%	±%
Reform	Bill Endean	4,852	47.55	
United	W. Alan Donald	3,230	31.65	
Labour	Tom Bloodworth	2,122	20.80	
Majority		1,622	15.90	+8.88
Informal votes		32	0.31	−0.37
Turnout		10,236	72.74	−13.81
Registered electors		14,073		

Endean won 22 of 24 polling places.
