= United Government of New Zealand =

Government of New Zealand, 1928–1931

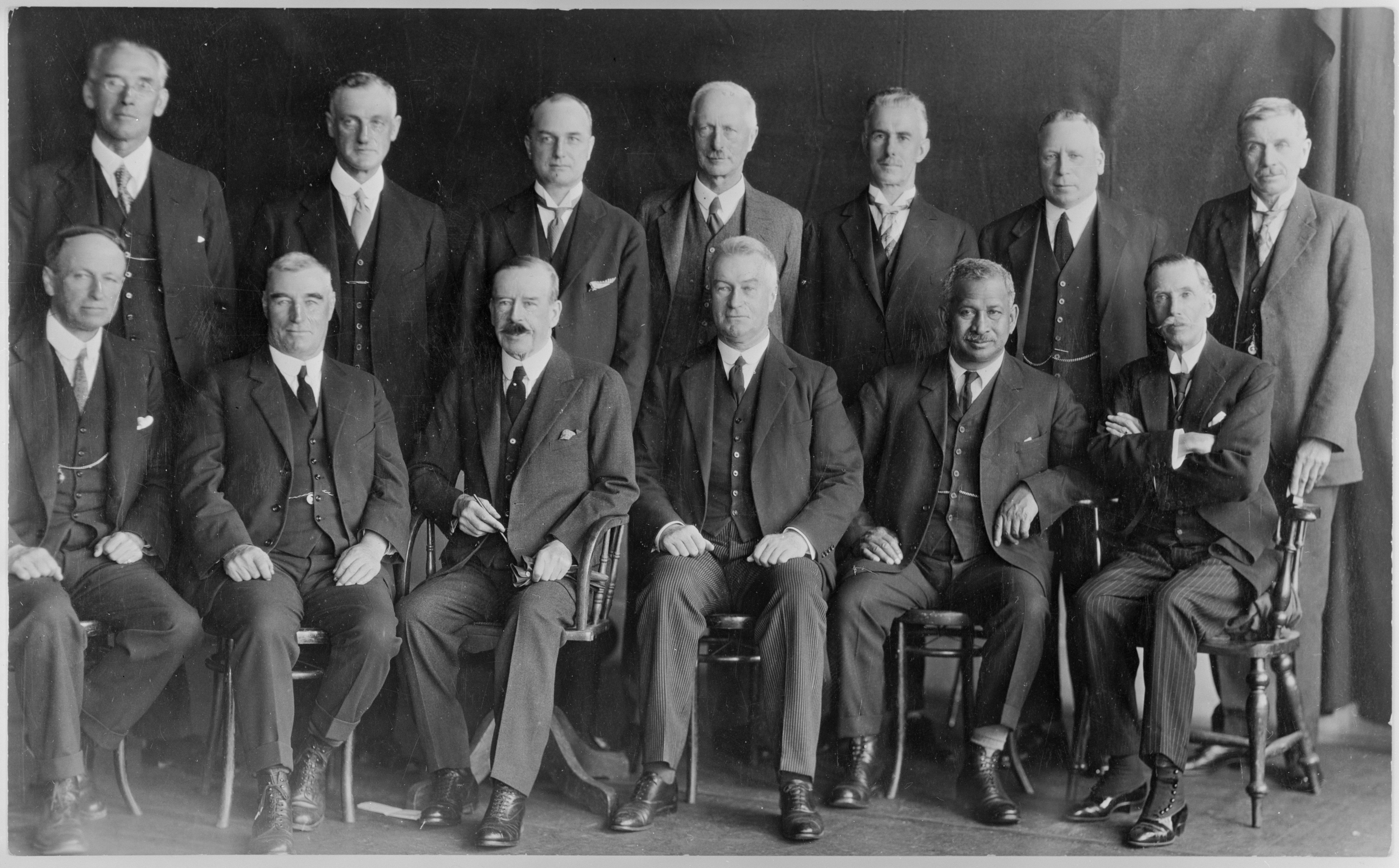
United cabinet, 1928.

The United Government of New Zealand was the government of New Zealand from 1928 to 1931, defeating the long-lived Reform Government. The United Party had been formed in 1927 from the remnants of the Liberal Party under Sir Joseph Ward, who had made a political comeback. They did not manage an outright win, but formed a government with Labour Party support. However, Ward was in poor health and was eventually succeeded by George Forbes. The new cabinet was notable for its inexperience, with four ministers not having sat in the House of Representatives previously.

== Significant policies ==
=== Economic ===
During the election campaign, Ward startled both his supporters and his audience by promising to borrow £70 million in a year to revive the economy; while this is believed to have been a mistake caused by Ward's failing eyesight, or was intended to be £70 million over eight to ten years, borrowed at £6 to £8 million per year (possibly a sympathetic amendment by the newspaper), it was popular with the electorate. Labour lost two urban seats: Auckland East (John A. Lee) and Grey Lynn (Fred Bartram), and many town workers and unionists must have heard "the musical chink of the seventy million". ... More by accident than design United seems to have manage to recreate to some extent the old Liberal combination of urban worker and rural support. In the circumstances it was ephemeral.

Chapman says that it is now clear that Ward inadvertently substituted 'seventy' for 'seven' when reading out the amount he would borrow in the first twelve months, and the correction to seventy millions spread over ten or eight years actually represented a shade less than Reform had already raised. But Reform's tactic of emphasising the larger amount backfired as many voters did not share Reform's financial orthodoxy. Ward amended the loan scheme in his final address in Dunedin to raise the sixty million portion for settlers by issuing bonds over the counter like packets of tea, and said that United would vote with Labour to oust the (Reform) Government. The resulting three-party vote astounded everyone, and was similar to 1919.

== Electoral results ==
Election	Parliament	Seats	Total votes	Percentage	Gain (loss)	Seats won	Change	Majority
1928	23rd	80	228,438	30.20%		27	+16	
1931	24th	80	396,004	55.4%		51	-3	11

== Prime ministers ==
The government was led by Sir Joseph Ward from 1928 to 1930, and then George Forbes from 1930 to 1931. Wilson gives the dates of office-holding as 10 December 1928 to 28 May 1930 for the Ward Ministry, and 28 May 1930 to 22 September 1931 for the Forbes Ministry.

Prime Ministers of the United Government

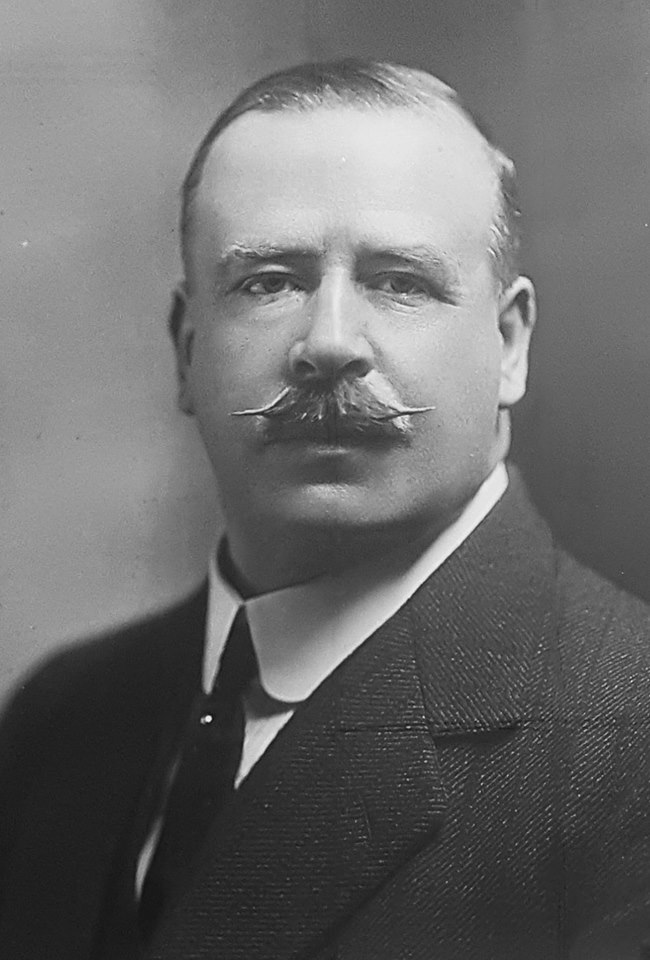
Joseph Ward
served 1928-1930

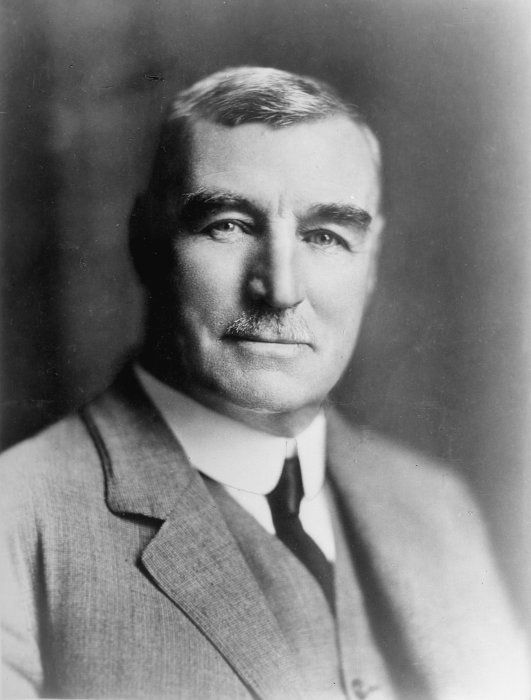
George Forbes
served 1930-1931

== Cabinet ministers ==
Party key	United Party
Party key	Independent

Portfolio	Minister	Start	End
Prime Minister	Joseph Ward	10 December 1928	28 May 1930
Prime Minister	George Forbes	28 May 1930	22 September 1931
Minister of Agriculture	George Forbes	10 December 1928	28 May 1930
Minister of Agriculture	Alfred Murdoch	28 May 1930	22 September 1931
Attorney-General	Thomas Sidey	10 December 1928	22 September 1931
Minister of Customs	William Taverner	10 December 1928	20 December 1929
Minister of Customs	James Donald	20 December 1929	28 May 1930
Minister of Customs	George Forbes	28 May 1930	22 September 1931
Minister of Defence	Thomas Wilford	10 December 1928	10 December 1929
Minister of Defence	John Cobbe	10 December 1929	22 September 1931
Minister of Education	Harry Atmore	10 December 1928	22 September 1931
Minister of Finance	Joseph Ward	10 December 1928	28 May 1930
Minister of Finance	George Forbes	28 May 1930	22 September 1931
Minister of Foreign Affairs	Joseph Ward	10 December 1928	28 May 1930
Minister of Foreign Affairs	George Forbes	28 May 1930	22 September 1931
Commissioner of State Forests	William Taverner	10 December 1928	28 May 1930
Commissioner of State Forests	Alfred Ransom	28 May 1930	22 September 1931
Minister of Health	Arthur Stallworthy	10 December 1928	22 September 1931
Minister of Immigration	John Cobbe	10 December 1928	28 May 1930
Minister of Immigration	Sydney George Smith	28 May 1930	22 September 1931
Minister of Industries and Commerce	John Cobbe	10 December 1928	18 December 1929
Minister of Industries and Commerce	James Donald	18 December 1929	28 May 1930
Minister of Industries and Commerce	Philip De La Perrelle	28 May 1930	22 September 1931
Minister of Internal Affairs	Philip De La Perrelle	10 December 1928	22 September 1931
Minister of Island Territories	Joseph Ward	10 December 1928	28 May 1930
Minister of Island Territories	George Forbes	28 May 1930	22 September 1931
Minister of Justice	Thomas Wilford	10 December 1928	18 December 1929
Minister of Justice	Thomas Sidey	18 December 1929	28 May 1930
Minister of Justice	John Cobbe	28 May 1930	22 September 1931
Minister of Labour	Bill Veitch	10 December 1928	28 May 1930
Minister of Labour	Sydney George Smith	28 May 1930	22 September 1931
Minister of Marine	John Cobbe	10 December 1928	28 May 1930
Minister of Marine	James Donald	28 May 1930	22 September 1931
Minister of Mines	Bill Veitch	10 December 1928	28 May 1930
Minister of Mines	Alfred Murdoch	28 May 1930	22 September 1931
Minister of Native Affairs	Āpirana Ngata	10 December 1928	22 September 1931
Postmaster-General	James Donald	10 December 1928	18 December 1929
Postmaster-General	Joseph Ward	18 December 1929	28 May 1930
Postmaster-General	James Donald	28 May 1930	22 September 1931
Minister of Railways	William Taverner	10 December 1928	28 May 1930
Minister of Railways	Bill Veitch	28 May 1930	22 September 1931
Minister of Revenue	Joseph Ward	10 December 1928	28 May 1930
Minister of Revenue	George Forbes	28 May 1930	22 September 1931
Minister of Science & Industrial Research	Harry Atmore	10 December 1928	28 May 1930
Minister of Science & Industrial Research	George Forbes	28 May 1930	22 September 1931
Minister of Transport	Bill Veitch	10 December 1928	28 May 1930
Minister of Transport	William Taverner	28 May 1930	22 September 1931
Minister of Works	Alfred Ransom	10 December 1928	28 May 1930
Minister of Works	William Taverner	28 May 1930	22 September 1931

== See also ==
- Governments of New Zealand
- New Zealand Liberal Party
- Reform Party (New Zealand)
