= Bill Endean =

New Zealand politician (1883–1957)

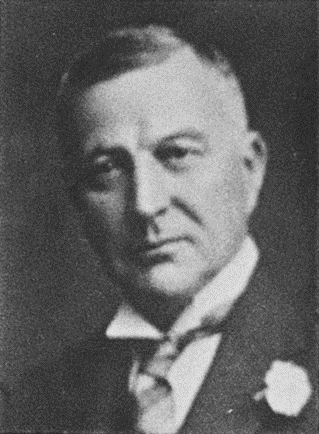
Endean, c. 1928

William Phillips Endean (26 September 1883 – 19 June 1957) was a New Zealand politician, first of the Reform Party then from 1935 the National Party. He failed to be selected for the 1943 election and was the first sitting National MP with that fate, but was called to the Legislative Council in 1950 as part of the Suicide squad. He was a lawyer by trade.

== Early life ==
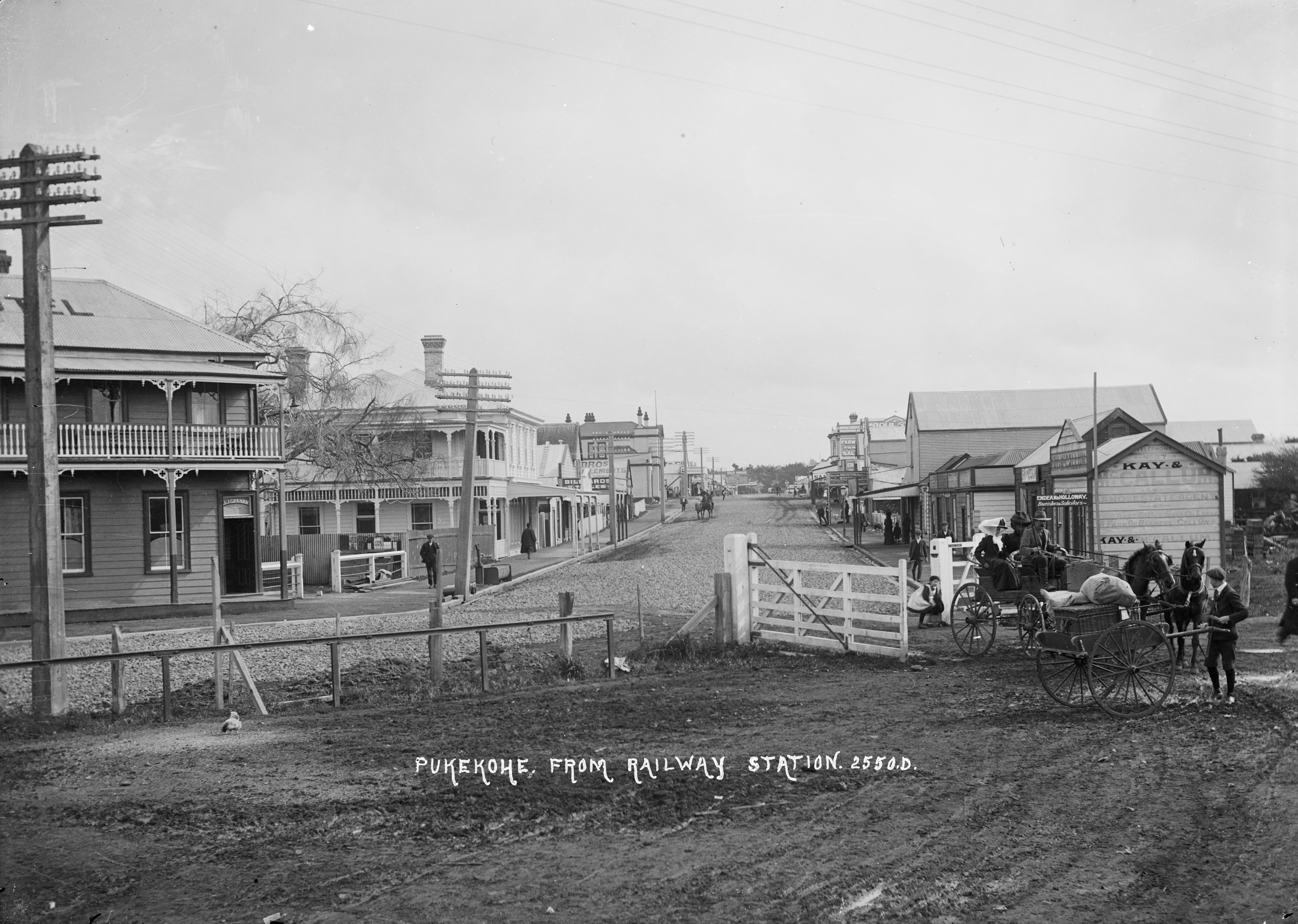
Pukekohe viewed from the railway station, with the premises of Endean & Holloway on the right near the gate

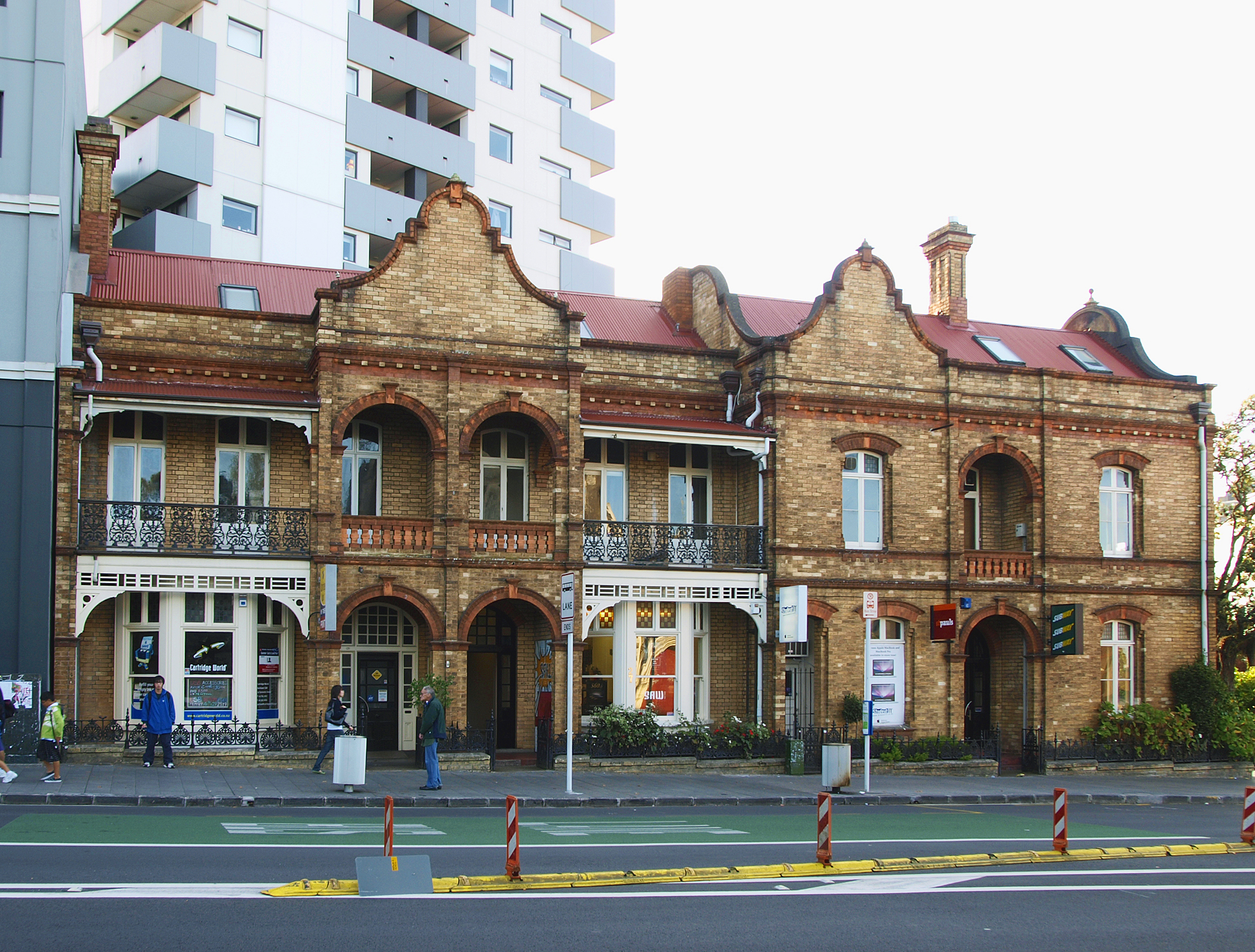
The private house of the Endean family in Symonds Street, Auckland

Endean was born in 1883 in Auckland. He was the son of John Endean, who made his money in gold mining in Australia, California and New Zealand. His father was later the proprietor of the Waitemata Hotel on the corner of Queen and Customs Street. His father built the Endeans Building on the corner of Queen and Quay Streets in Auckland in 1905, which was replaced after a fire in 1914–15; it is listed as a Category II heritage building. They lived in a large house in Symonds Street, which is listed as a Category I heritage building. His mother, Ellen Endean (née Phillips), was the first woman who stood for election to Auckland City Council in 1894, only one year after women received the vote in New Zealand. Endean's middle name was thus his mother's maiden name.

Endean graduated from Auckland University College with LLB in May 1906 and was a lawyer until 1930, but interrupted by WWI, when he served with the Royal Navy Volunteer Reserve. He worked with Frederick Baume KC and upon Baume's death in 1910, he bought his law practice off his estate. Within months, he took J. A. Holloway as a partner, whom he knew from college, and the practice was known as Endean and Holloway from then on.

Endean married Doris Linwood Simms in 1920.

== Political career ==
New Zealand Parliament
Years	Term	Electorate	Party
1930–1931	23rd	Parnell	Reform
1931–1935	24th	Parnell	Reform
1935–1936	25th	Parnell	Reform
1936–1938	Changed allegiance to:		National
1938–1943	26th	Remuera	National

Endean first entered Parliament through the 1930 Parnell by-election. The previous representative, Harry Reginald Jenkins of the United Party, had become an independent and sought the by-election to have his position reconfirmed by the electorate. Jenkins then joined the Reform Party, but Endean was selected as the party's candidate instead.

Endean represented the Auckland electorates of Parnell from 1930 to 1938, and then Remuera from 1938 to 1943. When the Reform Party merged with United to form the National Party in 1936, Endean became a National Party member. He was controversial within the National Party and in the party's 50-year history written by Barry Gustafson, it is remarked that in 1938, there was "some resistance to the National MP" in the Remuera electorate. His nomination for the planned 1941 general election only occurred after Sidney Holland had stepped in. The 1941 election was postponed due to the war, though, and Endean failed to get selected by the National Party for the 1943 election; Ronald Algie was chosen instead. Endean was overseas at the time of the selection, but even if he had been present, Gustafson believes that the "elderly, dull Endean would have been no match for the clever and witty Algie". Endean was the first sitting National MP who failed to get re-selected.

Endean was a close friend of Gordon Coates and a member of the 'win the war' group together with Coates, Adam Hamilton, Jack Massey and Bert Kyle. He had considered running as an independent in the 1943 election, but withdrew at the start of the campaign due to criticism from the National Party.

In 1935, he was awarded the King George V Silver Jubilee Medal.

=== Legislative Council ===
Endean was appointed to the Legislative Council in 1950, as one of the so-called suicide squad who voted to abolish it. He was a member from 22 June until 31 December of that year.

== Death ==
Endean died on 19 June 1957. His wife died in 1965.

== Notes ==
New Zealand Parliament
Preceded by Harry Jenkins	Member of Parliament for Parnell; 1930–1938	Vacant Constituency abolished, recreated in 1946 Title next held by Duncan Rae
New constituency	Member of Parliament for Remuera; 1938–1943	Succeeded by Ronald Algie
