= Arthur Stallworthy =

New Zealand politician

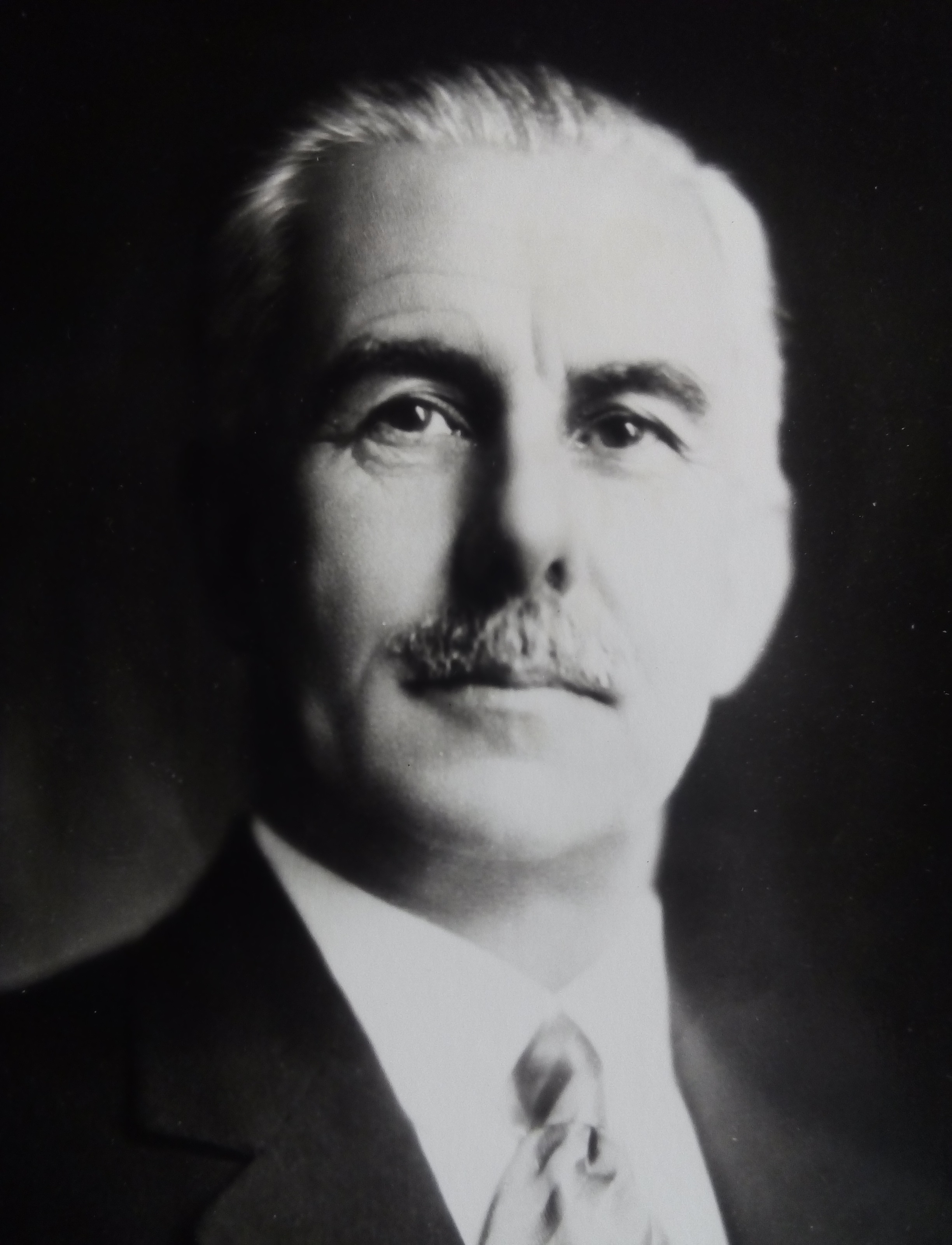
Stallworthy in 1928.

Arthur John Stallworthy (18 April 1877 – 1 August 1954) was a New Zealand politician of the United Party, and a Cabinet minister.

== Biography ==
=== Early life and career ===
Stallworthy was born in 1877 in Auckland, New Zealand. He was the eldest son of John Stallworthy, who had come to New Zealand in 1872, and who was Member of Parliament for the Kaipara electorate from 1905 to 1911. His mother was Annie Jane Stallworthy. His father was employed by the Auckland Education Board as a teacher and in 1880, he was posted to Aratapu School in Hobson County, Northland, with the family moving there. Aratapu is today a small settlement on the west bank of the Wairoa River, a short distance downstream from Dargaville, but back then economically as important as Dargaville if not ahead.

His father became a newspaper proprietor but was blind for the last ten years of his life, and Arthur Stallworthy took over the running of the Wairoa Bell and Northern Advertiser. After his father's death in November 1923, Arthur Stallworthy inherited the newspaper, which he sold soon after. He then moved to Auckland to be near his children, who attended Auckland University College.

=== Political career ===
New Zealand Parliament
| Years | Term | Electorate | Party |
|---|---|---|---|
| 1928–1931 | 23rd | Eden | United |
| 1931–1935 | 24th | Eden | United |

In 1927 he was elected a member of the Auckland City Council. He served one two-year term before deciding not to seek re-election. In 1935 he stood for Mayor of Auckland City. He placed third out of three candidates in a tight race behind Ernest Davis and Joe Sayegh.

He represented the Eden electorate from 1928 to 1935, when he was deselected by the United/Reform Coalition. He stood in the 1935 as a Democrat losing to the Labour candidate, Bill Anderton.

Stallworthy was the Minister of Health from 1928 to 1931, first under Joseph Ward and then George Forbes. In 1935, he was awarded the King George V Silver Jubilee Medal.

=== Later life and death ===
Stallworthy died in 1954. His son, John Stallworthy (1906–1993), was Nuffield Professor of Obstetrics and Gynaecology at the University of Oxford (1967–1973). His grandson, Jon Stallworthy (1935–2014), was professor emeritus of English at the University of Oxford.

== Notes ==
New Zealand Parliament
| Preceded by Rex Mason | Member of Parliament for Eden; 1928–1935 | Succeeded by Bill Anderton |
Political offices
| Preceded by Alexander Young | Minister of Health; 1928–1931 | Succeeded by Alexander Young |
