= Philip De La Perrelle =

New Zealand politician (1872–1935)

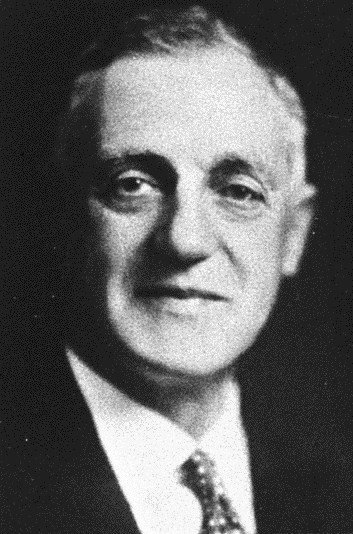
De la Perrelle in 1928.

Philip Aldborough de la Perrelle (1872 – 7 December 1935) was a New Zealand politician of the Liberal Party and the United Party.

== Biography ==
=== Early life ===
De la Perrelle was born at Arrowtown in 1872. He was a newspaper proprietor and owned the Lake Country Press from age 21, and the Winton Record from 1912.

=== Political career ===
New Zealand Parliament
| Years | Term | Electorate | Party |
|---|---|---|---|
| 1922–1925 | 21st | Awarua | Liberal |
| 1928–1931 | 23rd | Awarua | United |
| 1931–1935 | 24th | Awarua | United |

He represented the Southland electorate of Awarua in Parliament from 1922 when he defeated John Ronald Hamilton of the Reform Party. Hamilton won the electorate back in 1925, but De La Perrelle won it again in 1928 and held it to 1935, when he retired due to indifferent health, and he died within days of the 1935 election.

He was a cabinet minister in the Ward and Forbes Ministries of the United Government from 1928 to 1931; Internal Affairs (1928–1931).

In May 1935, he was awarded the King George V Silver Jubilee Medal.

De la Perrelle was twice married. He died on 7 December 1935, and was survived by his second wife and three sons.

== Notes ==
New Zealand Parliament
| Preceded by John Ronald Hamilton | Member of Parliament for Awarua; 1922–1925; 1928–1935 | Succeeded by John Ronald Hamilton |
| Preceded by John Ronald Hamilton | Member of Parliament for Awarua; 1922–1925; 1928–1935 | Succeeded by James Hargest |
