= Harry Reginald Jenkins =

New Zealand politician (1881–1970)

Harry Jenkins
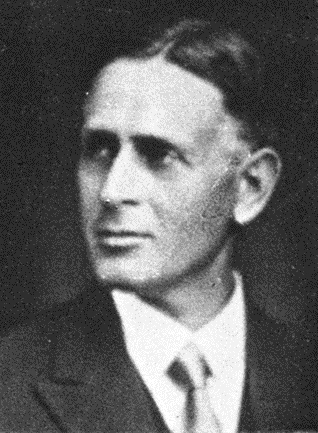
- Jenkins in 1928

Member of the New Zealand Parliament for Parnell
- In office 14 November 1928 – 7 May 1930
- Preceded by: James Dickson
- Succeeded by: Bill Endean

Personal details
- Born: 24 October 1881
- Died: 21 June 1970 (aged 88)
- Party: United

Harry Reginald Jenkins (24 October 1881 – 21 June 1970) was a New Zealand Member of Parliament for Parnell in Auckland, New Zealand, representing the United Party.

== Member of Parliament ==
New Zealand Parliament
Years	Term	Electorate	Party
1928–1930	23rd	Parnell	United
1930	Changed allegiance to:		Independent

Jenkins represented the Parnell electorate from the 1928 general election to his resignation in 1930.

In 1925 he stood unsuccessfully for the Auckland City Council as an independent candidate and was also unsuccessful in 1927 standing on a Progressive Citizens' ticket.

=== Resignation ===
In March 1930, Jenkins left the United Party and announced that he believed that the Reform Party leader, Gordon Coates, was "the ablest man in Parliament". He subsequently resigned his seat and then sought the Reform nomination in the by-election. Instead, Reform selected Bill Endean as its candidate. Endean won the by-election on 7 May 1930.

After leaving parliament, he was elected as a member of the Auckland City Council in 1931 standing on the Citizens' ticket.

== Notes ==
New Zealand Parliament
Preceded by James Dickson	Member of Parliament for Parnell; 1928–1930	Succeeded by Bill Endean
