= John Hamilton (New Zealand politician) =

New Zealand politician (1871–1940)

New Zealand Parliament
Years	Term	Electorate	Party
1919–1922	20th	Awarua	Reform
1925–1928	22nd	Awarua	Reform

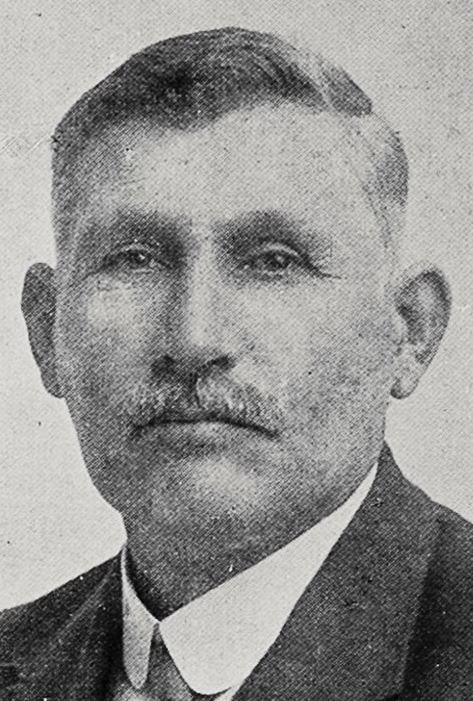
John Ronald Hamilton

John Ronald Hamilton (1871 – 12 January 1940) was a New Zealand politician of the Reform Party.

Hamilton was born in 1871 in Forest Hill in Southland, where he received his education. He later moved to the nearby Winton. He was the elder brother of Adam Hamilton.

Hamilton unsuccessfully contested the Southland electorate of Awarua in the 1911 and 1914 elections, before he was successful in 1919. He lost the 1922 election, but defeated Philip De La Perrelle of the Liberal Party in 1925, but lost to him in 1928.

In 1935, Hamilton was awarded the King George V Silver Jubilee Medal.

He died at Winton on 12 January 1940.

New Zealand Parliament
Preceded by Joseph Ward	Member of Parliament for Awarua; 1919–1922; 1925–1928	Succeeded by Philip De La Perrelle
Preceded by Philip De La Perrelle	Member of Parliament for Awarua; 1919–1922; 1925–1928	Succeeded by Philip De La Perrelle
