= James Samuel Dickson =

New Zealand politician

New Zealand Parliament
| Years | Term | Electorate | Party |
|---|---|---|---|
| 1911–1914 | 18th | Parnell | Reform |
| 1914–1919 | 19th | Parnell | Reform |
| 1919–1922 | 20th | Parnell | Reform |
| 1922–1925 | 21st | Parnell | Reform |
| 1925–1928 | 22nd | Parnell | Reform |

James Samuel Dickson (1870 – 18 October 1939) was a Reform Party Member of Parliament in New Zealand.

Born in Belfast, County Antrim, in 1870, Dickson emigrated to New Zealand in about 1887.

He won the Auckland electorate of Parnell in the 1911 general election, winning on the second ballot against a senior Liberal from Wellington, Sir John Findlay, with some support from Labour. He held the seat until 1928, when he was defeated. He was the chief government whip from 1919 to 1928, and also served as chair of the railways committee and the labour bills committee.

Outside of parliament, Dickson served on the Remuera Road Board for 15 years, including five years as chairman. He was also a member of the Auckland City Council, the Auckland Drainage Board, the Auckland Hospital Board and the Manukau County Council. He was also a Grand Master of the Orange Order.

He died in Auckland in 1939, and was buried at Purewa Cemetery.

New Zealand Parliament
| Preceded by Frank Lawry | Member of Parliament for Parnell; 1911–1928 | Succeeded by Harry Jenkins |
