= Parnell (electorate) =

Parnell was a parliamentary electorate in the city of Auckland, New Zealand, from 1861 to 1954, with one break of eight years.

== Population centres ==
In the 1860 electoral redistribution, the House of Representatives increased the number of representatives by 12, reflecting the immense population growth since the original electorates were established in 1853. The redistribution created 15 additional electorates with between one and three members, and Parnell was one of the single-member electorates. The electorates were distributed to provinces so that every province had at least two members. Within each province, the number of registered electors by electorate varied greatly. The Parnell electorate had 268 registered electors for the 1861 election.

Over the years, Parnell sometimes comprised a small area, and sometimes it covered quite a large area. Much of the area covered fluctuated between the Parnell and Manukau electorates.

In 1927 the Representation Commission proposed altering the Parnell boundaries; which if confirmed would have made the electorate "dry" or no-licence, and without an authority which could issue temporary licences for the Ellerslie and Alexandra Park raceways. Following objections, the boundary between the Parnell and Auckland East electorates was adjusted to include a hotel in the Parnell electorate (so retaining its licensing committee). John A. Lee later claimed that this adjustment cost him his Auckland East seat in the 1928 election. In 1936 Lee tried to weaken Endean's grip on Parnell (the only non-Labour seat in Auckland) with the Orakei state housing scheme, and proposed to evict the Māori marae (see Bastion Point). Michael Joseph Savage reversed the Cabinet decision when he returned from the Coronation in England.

In the 1937 electoral redistribution, Parnell was abolished and replaced with the Remuera electorate, covering almost exactly the same area as Parnell had since the 1927 electoral redistribution.

The 1941 New Zealand census had been postponed due to World War II, so the 1946 electoral redistribution had to take ten years of population growth and movements into account. The North Island gained a further two electorates from the South Island due to faster population growth. The abolition of the country quota through the Electoral Amendment Act, 1945 reduced the number and increased the size of rural electorates. None of the existing electorates remained unchanged, 27 electorates were abolished, 19 electorates were created for the first time, and eight former electorates were re-established, including Parnell. The Parnell electorate existed alongside the Remuera electorate. It was abolished again with the next electoral redistribution, which was held in 1952 and became effective with the 1954 election. Most of the Parnell electorate's area went once again to the Remuera electorate.

== History ==
The electorate was represented by ten Members of Parliament:

=== Members of Parliament ===
Key

Independent Conservative Liberal Reform United National

Election	Winner
1861 election	Reader Wood
1865 by-election	Robert Creighton
1866 election	Frederick Whitaker
1867 by-election	Charles Heaphy
1870 by-election	Reader Wood
1871 election	Reader Wood
1875 election	Reader Wood
1878 by-election	Frederick Moss
1879 election	Frederick Moss
1881 election	Frederick Moss
1884 election	Frederick Moss
1887 election	Frederick Moss
1890 election	Frank Lawry
1893 election	Frank Lawry
1896 election	Frank Lawry
1899 election	Frank Lawry
1902 election	Frank Lawry
1905 election	Frank Lawry
1908 election	Frank Lawry
1911 election	James Dickson
1914 election	James Dickson
1919 election	James Dickson
1922 election	James Dickson
1925 election	James Dickson
1928 election	Harry Jenkins
1930 by-election	Bill Endean
1931 election	Bill Endean
1935 election	Bill Endean
(electorate abolished 1938–1946; see Remuera)
1946 election	Duncan Rae
1949 election	Duncan Rae
1951 election	Duncan Rae
(electorate abolished 1954; see Remuera)

== Election results ==
=== 1951 election ===
1951 general election: Parnell
Party	Candidate	Votes	%	±%
National	Duncan Rae	6,355	57.13	+3.58
Labour	Hugh Watt	4,768	42.86	
Majority		1,587	14.26	+6.04
Turnout		11,123	87.36	−6.54
Registered electors		12,732		

=== 1949 election ===
1949 general election: Parnell
Party	Candidate	Votes	%	±%
National	Duncan Rae	6,255	53.55	+3.80
Labour	Bill Schramm	5,295	45.33	
Communist	Rita Smith	131	1.12	
Majority		960	8.22	+6.53
Informal votes		54	0.46	−1.72
Turnout		11,735	93.90	−0.51
Registered electors		12,497		

=== 1946 election ===
1946 general election: Parnell
Party	Candidate	Votes	%	±%
National	Duncan Rae	6,059	49.75	
Labour	Bill Schramm	5,853	48.06	
Informal votes		266	2.18	
Majority		206	1.69	
Turnout		12,178	94.41	
Registered electors		12,898		

=== 1935 election ===
1935 general election: Parnell
Party	Candidate	Votes	%	±%
Reform	Bill Endean	5,758	39.36	−25.87
Labour	Arthur Osborne	5,028	34.37	
Independent	Alexander Herdman	3,334	22.79	
Independent Liberal	Frederick Coles Jordan	507	3.46	
Informal votes		174	1.18	−0.10
Majority		730	4.99	−37.66
Turnout		14,627	90.42	+11.48
Registered electors		16,176		

=== 1931 election ===
1931 general election: Parnell
Party	Candidate	Votes	%	±%
Reform	Bill Endean	7,374	65.23	+17.68
Labour	John William Yarnall	2,553	22.58	
Independent	William Collingbourne Hewitt	1,377	12.18	
Majority		4,821	42.65	+26.75
Informal votes		147	1.28	+0.97
Turnout		11,451	78.94	+6.20
Registered electors		14,506		

=== 1930 by-election ===
1930 Parnell by-election
Party	Candidate	Votes	%	±%
Reform	Bill Endean	4,852	47.55	
United	W. Alan Donald	3,230	31.65	
Labour	Tom Bloodworth	2,122	20.80	
Majority		1,622	15.90	+8.88
Informal votes		32	0.31	−0.37
Turnout		10,236	72.74	−13.81
Registered electors		14,073		

=== 1928 election ===
1928 general election: Parnell
Party	Candidate	Votes	%	±%
United	Harry Reginald Jenkins	5,642	46.64	
Reform	James Samuel Dickson	4,793	39.62	
Labour	John William Yarnall	1,661	13.73	
Majority		849	7.02	
Informal votes		83	0.68	
Turnout		12,179	86.54	
Registered electors		14,073		

=== 1919 election ===
1919 general election: Parnell
Party	Candidate	Votes	%	±%
Reform	James Samuel Dickson	5,706	62.50	
Labour	Tom Bloodworth	2,287	25.05	
Liberal	Rosetta Baume	1,026	11.23	
Informal votes		110	1.20	
Majority		3,419	37.45	
Turnout		9,129	76.17	
Registered electors		11,985		

^{b} Rosetta Baume was one of three women in 1919 who stood at short notice when women were able to stand as candidates for election to parliament.

=== 1911 election ===
1911 general election: Parnell, first ballot
Party	Candidate	Votes	%	±%
Reform	James Samuel Dickson	3,585	44.19	
Liberal	John Findlay	2,971	36.62	
Labour	Joe Mack	1,557	19.19	
Majority		614	7.57	
Informal votes		93	1.13	
Turnout		8,206	81.97	
Registered electors		10,011		

1911 general election: Parnell, second ballot
Party	Candidate	Votes	%	±%
Reform	James Samuel Dickson	4,264	52.71	
Liberal	John Findlay	3,826	47.29	
Majority		438	5.41	
Informal votes		25	0.31	
Turnout		8,115	81.06	
Registered electors		10,011		

=== 1899 election ===
1899 general election: Parnell
Party	Candidate	Votes	%	±%
Liberal	Frank Lawry	2,263	49.93	
Conservative	Hugh Campbell	1,423	31.40	
Conservative	John Candlish Allen	846	18.67	
Majority		840	18.53	
Turnout		4,532	74.55	
Registered electors		6,079		

=== 1890 election ===
1890 general election: Parnell
Party	Candidate	Votes	%	±%
Conservative	Frank Lawry	656	59.47	
Independent Liberal	James Marshall Lennox	447	40.52	
Majority		209	18.94	
Turnout		1,103	64.27	
Registered electors		1,716		
