= Joe Sayegh =

New Zealand politician and businessman

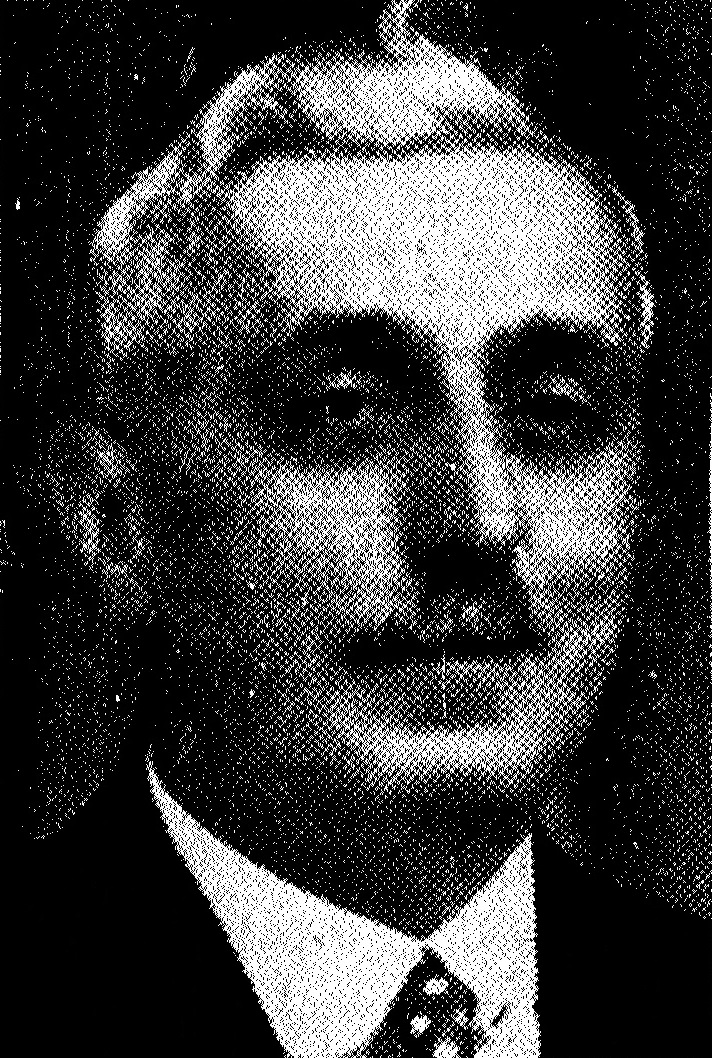
Joe Sayegh

Joseph Callil Sayegh JP (7 March 1884 – 29 March 1946) was a New Zealand politician and businessman.

== Biography ==
=== Early life and career ===
Sayegh was of Assyrian origin, born in Lebanon 11 kilometres from Bethlehem on 7 March 1884. Sayegh's father Callil emigrated with his family from Lebanon to Sydney, Australia in 1888. The Sayegh family later moved to New Zealand in 1894 arriving in Wellington before finally settling in Auckland. Callil Sayegh set up business as owner operator of a restaurant which Joe was to take over on his father's retirement. Situated on Auckland's Queen Street, opposite to the Civic Theatre, Sayegh's establishment specialized in serving tea and confectionery. He later became the President of the Auckland Retail Confectioners' Association.

=== Political career ===
Sayegh was a member of the Labour Party and successfully stood for the Auckland City Council in 1933. He later stood as the Labour Party's candidate for Mayor of Auckland in 1935, 1938 and 1941.

In 1935 Sayegh was subject of a selection controversy when selected over prominent local lawyer and MP Rex Mason with the blessing of Auckland Labour Representation Committee executive Fred Young. Sayegh was viewed a respectable individual and competent city councillor, but most gave him little chance of beating Citizens candidate Ernest Davis. As Young had been employed by Davis for many years, John A. Lee and several Labour MPs alleged that Young had been bribed by Davis to ensure the selection of a weak Labour candidate for the Mayoralty which caused a rift in the Auckland Labour Party. Sayegh's campaign was not helped due to continued interference by Lee who tried to discredit him, calling him a "dumb wop fellow who could not even speak English". Regardless, Sayegh polled extremely well in the election, losing to Davis by only 363 votes. Despite losing the Mayoralty Sayegh was easily re-elected to the council, topping the poll with more votes than any other candidate.

Three years later Sayegh's share of the vote fell when he was again defeated by Davis. Sayegh stood for the Mayoralty a third time in 1941 but was beaten by Citizens & Ratepayers nominee John Allum.

Sayegh was himself President of the Auckland Labour Representation Committee by 1940 and played a part in the expulsion of Lee from the Labour Party in 1940. Later that year, he stood for the Labour nomination at the Auckland West by-election following the death of Prime Minister Michael Joseph Savage, but lost to Peter Carr. Following this he was selected by the Labour Party to contest the Grey Lynn electorate against Lee in the scheduled 1941 general election. However, the 1941 election was postponed until 1943 due to World War II. Sayegh ultimately did not stand in the 1943 election.

=== Later life and death ===
By 1944 Sayegh had largely retired from public life. He had closed his Queen Street store and had taken up a position as the Chairman of Directors at the Robinson Ice Cream Company.

He declined to stand for Mayor a fourth time and also retired from the Auckland City Council, Transport Board and Harbour Board, standing only for the Hospital Board and Power Board. He became chairman of Labour's Auckland East branch. Sayegh died whilst staying in a Dunedin hotel on 29 March 1946. He had been in Invercargill to attend a conference of justices of the peace and was on his way back to Auckland when he died. He was buried at Hillsborough Cemetery, Auckland.

At the time of his death he had been nominated as a candidate for the Auckland Electric Power Board by the Labour Party for a by-election.

== Personal life ==
Sayegh never married. His sister, Josephine Catherine Sayegh, married rugby league player Wilf Hassan on 9 July 1935 at St. Benedict's Church.
