= Samuel Crookes =

Engineering teacher and politician (1871–1955)

Samuel Irwin Crookes (1871–26 December 1955) was a New Zealand engineering teacher and consultant, local politician. He was born in Sheffield, Yorkshire, England on 1871.

In 1935, he was awarded the King George V Silver Jubilee Medal.
