= Ted Phelan =

New Zealand trade unionist and politician (1874–1961)

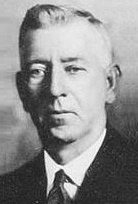
Phelan in 1928

Edward John Phelan JP (1874 – 28 March 1961) was a New Zealand trade unionist, politician and rugby league administrator.

== Biography ==
=== Early life and union career ===
Phelan was born in Auckland in 1874 and attended Wellesley Street School. He left school aged 14 and attained a job as a tally boy in a sawmill north of Wairoa. He married Ellen McIlroy in 1896. They had one son and two daughters. In Wairoa Phelan made a name for himself in public affairs. He was elected a member of the local hospital board and was a prominent member of the local branch of the Timber Workers' Union.

He later returned to Auckland and in 1907 became national secretary of the Timber Workers' Union. He held this post for a record 30 years. He then proceeded to serve as Dominion President of the union.

=== Political career ===
He was elected to the Auckland City Council in 1925 on a Labour Party ticket, remaining a member for 13 years. He was a popular councillor and "topped the poll", receiving more votes than any other candidate, in 1933. He declined nomination to stand for the mayoralty in 1935 citing a conflict of interest, as he was also running the Hotel Auckland for Ernest Davis, who had already declared his candidacy. In 1938 he was unexpectedly denied re-nomination by the Labour Party alongside sitting councillors Arthur Rosser and George Gordon Grant.

Phelan was approached to stand for Parliament in the 1930 Parnell by-election, but he declined the invitation to seek the Labour Party nomination.

He was also a member of the Auckland Harbour Board and Auckland Transport Board. He retired from his last political office, the Auckland Transport Licensing Authority, in 1953 after nearly 30 years of public service.

=== Other activities ===
He was also involved in various pro-war and veteran support causes during and after World War I. He was a board member of both the Rehabilitation Board and the War Relief Commission Patriotic Association.

Phelan was actively involved in the Rugby League movement in New Zealand. He was a trustee of Carlaw Park in Auckland and helped oversee the construction, use and maintenance of the ground. His involvement in the sport peaked when he was appointed the manager of the New Zealand team's 1911 tour of Australia, their first official overseas tour. He donated a shield named after himself to the Auckland rugby league (the Phelan Shield) which is still played for today.

=== Later life and death ===
Phelan died in 1961 aged 87 years. He was survived by three children. Ellen has predeceased him by 25 years, having died in 1936.
