= George Hutchison (mayor) =

New Zealand politician and accountant (1882–1947)

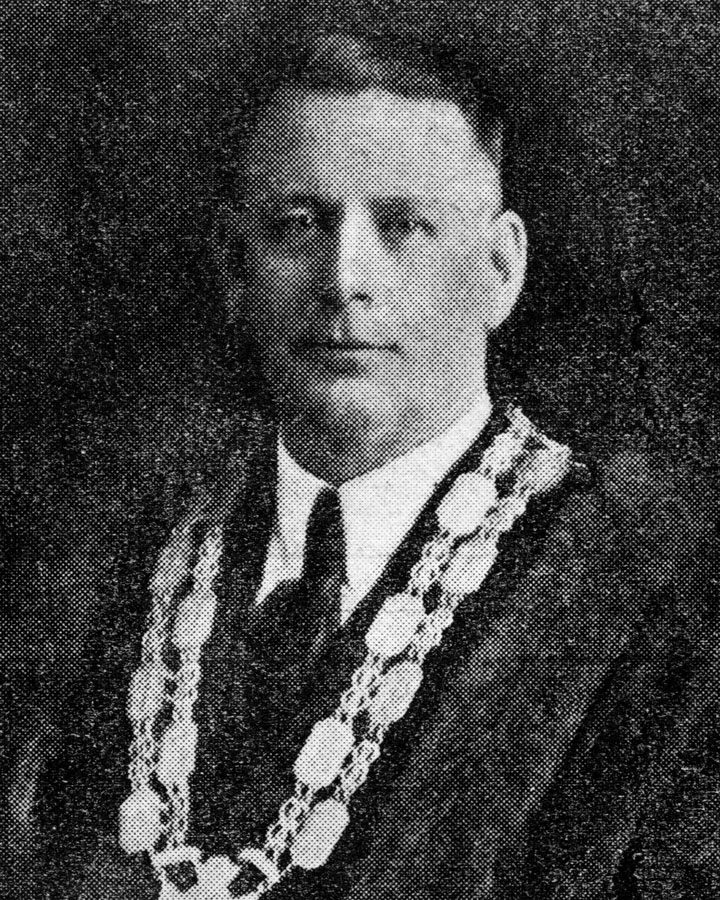
George Hutchison

George William Hutchison CMG (3 April 1882 – 14 February 1947) was a New Zealand politician and accountant. He was Mayor of Auckland City from 1931 to 1935.

== Biography ==
Hutchison was born in Mangonui in 1882 and educated at Auckland Grammar School. He was a public accountant in Auckland from 1907, rising to become a Fellow of the New Zealand Society of Accountants and Auditors, and local President of the Chartered Institute of Secretaries. From 1911, he was secretary of the Auckland branch of the Automobile Association. He was the president of the Auckland Rotary Club in 1928/29 and a vice-president of the Auckland Town Planning Association. He served on the University of Auckland Council from 1929.

Hutchison entered local-body politics as a member of the One Tree Hill Road Board. He was elected onto Auckland City Council in 1929 and was elected mayor in 1931. In the 1934 King's Birthday Honours, he was appointed a Companion of the Order of St Michael and St George. He was appointed a Chevalier of the Légion d’honneur by the Republic of France on 3 December 1934, in recognition of his service to visiting French warships as the Mayor of Auckland. This award was announced by the French Foreign Minister along with awards to Reverend Hadden Kingston Vickery and The Honourable John Alexander, which were "made as tokens of appreciation of the very cordial welcome which the city of Auckland...[had] never failed to extend to various French warships." In 1935, he was awarded the King George V Silver Jubilee Medal.

Hutchinson was succeeded as mayor by Sir Ernest Davis in 1935, but served as French Consular Agent in Auckland from 1939 to 1942, and died in Auckland on 14 February 1947.

== Awards and decorations ==
- Companion of the Order of St Michael and St George (1934)
- Chevalier of the Legion of Honour (1934)
- King George V Silver Jubilee Medal (1935)

Political offices
Preceded by George Baildon	Mayor of Auckland City; 1931–1935	Succeeded by Ernest Davis
