= George Baildon =

New Zealand businessman (1868–1946)

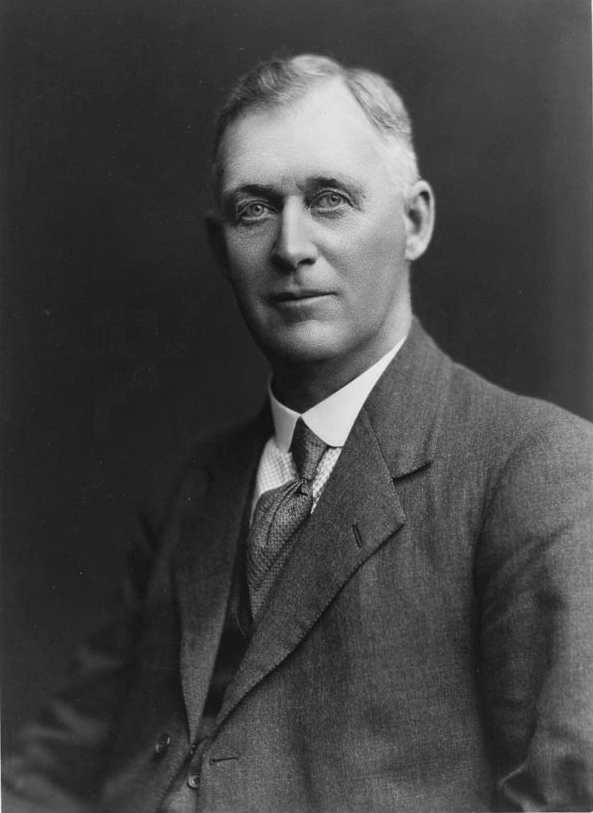
Baildon in 1920

George Baildon (1868–1946) was a New Zealand businessman and Mayor of Auckland City from 1925 to 1931.

== Biography ==
Born and educated in Auckland, George Baildon was a builder and contractor. He was on the Archhill Road Board for four years (one year as chairman), then on the Grey Lynn Borough Council from 1909 and mayor of Grey Lynn from 1912. This was until Grey Lynn amalgamated with Auckland in 1914. He was then on the Auckland City Council from 1914 to 1925 and deputy mayor from 1922 before becoming mayor of Auckland city in 1925. He was also on the Auckland Hospital Board.

In 1935, he was awarded the King George V Silver Jubilee Medal.

Political offices
Preceded by James Gunson	Mayor of Auckland City; 1925–1931	Succeeded by George Hutchison
