= James Donald (politician) =

New Zealand politician

The Honourable Sir James Donald
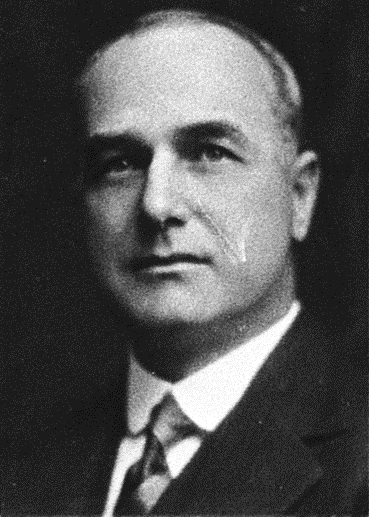

20th Minister of Marine
- In office 28 May 1930 – 22 September 1931
- Prime Minister: George Forbes
- Preceded by: John Cobbe
- Succeeded by: John Cobbe

12th Minister of Industries and Commerce
- In office 20 December 1929 – 28 May 1930
- Prime Minister: Sir Joseph Ward
- Preceded by: John Cobbe
- Succeeded by: Philip De La Perrelle

32nd Minister of Customs
- In office 20 December 1929 – 28 May 1930
- Prime Minister: Sir Joseph Ward
- Preceded by: William Taverner
- Succeeded by: George Forbes

29th Postmaster-General and Minister of Telegraphs
- In office 28 May 1930 – 22 September 1931
- Prime Minister: George Forbes
- Preceded by: Sir Joseph Ward
- Succeeded by: Adam Hamilton
- In office 10 December 1928 – 18 December 1929
- Prime Minister: Sir Joseph Ward
- Preceded by: William Nosworthy
- Succeeded by: Sir Joseph Ward

Member of the New Zealand Parliament for Auckland East
- In office 14 November 1928 – 2 December 1931
- Preceded by: John A. Lee
- Succeeded by: Bill Schramm

Personal details
- Born: 13 October 1879 Auckland, New Zealand
- Died: 4 December 1971 (aged 92) New Zealand
- Party: United

Sir James Bell Donald JP (13 October 1879 – 4 December 1971) was a United Party Member of Parliament and Cabinet Minister in Auckland, New Zealand.

== Biography ==
=== Early life ===
Donald was born in Auckland on 13 October 1879. He was the second son of Mr. Alexander Bell Donald, a local merchant and trader, who owned the firm of Donald and Edeuborough. Donald studied at Queen's College and then entered his father's profession and would later become the firm's managing director. By the age of 48 he became a justice of the peace.

=== Member of Parliament ===
New Zealand Parliament
Years	Term	Electorate	Party
1928–1931	23rd	Auckland East	United

He won the Auckland East electorate off Labour's John A. Lee in 1928, by 37 votes (Lee put his loss down to alterations in the electorate boundary with Parnell to keep the two Auckland race-courses in a "wet" electorate). According to Olsen, Lee's opponent was "a staunch anti-militarist who had been gaoled during the [Great] war". He was a cabinet minister from 1928 to 1931 in the United Government (Minister of Marine, Minister of Industries and Commerce, Minister of Customs, Postmaster-General and Minister of Telegraphs, and Minister in charge of Public Service Superannuation, Friendly Societies, and National Provident Fund Departments). Donald was one of several ministers who had not only no prior ministerial experience but no previous parliamentary experience either due to the unexpected success of United. Nevertheless he proved himself to be an able minister.

When a coalition government was formed between the United and Reform parties Donald was one of the ministers who were removed from the cabinet in order to accommodate the new Reform members. When he retired (to general surprise) in 1931, the electorate went back to Labour due to vote-splitting as there were four anti-Labour candidates: William Henry Horton from United, Harold Percy Burton (who came second) and Ellen Melville from Reform and an Independent John Alexander Arthur. This handed the seat back to Labour "on a plate".

In May 1935, he was awarded the King George V Silver Jubilee Medal. He left the United Party and joined the anti-socialist Democrat Party. In August 1935 the Auckland provincial executive of the Democrat Party elected Donald its chairman of committees. At the 1935 general election he stood again for the Auckland East seat as the Democrat candidate. He placed third out of four candidates.

He was also a long serving member of the Auckland City Council serving 18 years between 1923 and 1941. Additionally, from 1935 was the council's representative on the Auckland Harbour Board where he became deputy chairman. In 1946 he was chairman of the Harbour Board until 1947 when he declined to seek re-election. He was a leading member of the Citizens & Ratepayers Association and was its chairman for 16 years between 1935 and 1951.

=== Later life and death ===
After exiting Parliament he resumed his business activities in Auckland. In 1936 he became a director of the Northern Roller Milling Company and was chairman of the board of directors from 1954 to 1959 before retiring from the board in 1960.

He was later appointed a Knight Bachelor, for services to the community, in the 1969 New Year Honours.

Donald died in 1971 aged 92.

In 2016 Donald's granddaughter Desley Simpson was elected a member of the Auckland Council and Simpson paid tribute to him in her maiden speech and wore the fob chain presented to him when he became deputy chairman of the Auckland Harbour Board in 1935.

== Notes ==
Political offices
Preceded by John Cobbe	Minister of Marine; 1930–1931	Succeeded by John Cobbe
Preceded by John Cobbe	Minister of Industries and Commerce; 1929–1930	Succeeded by Philip De La Perrelle
Preceded by William Taverner	Minister of Customs; 1929–1930	Succeeded by George Forbes
Preceded by Joseph Ward	Postmaster-General and Minister of Telegraphs; 1930–1931; 1928–1929	Succeeded by Adam Hamilton
Preceded by William Nosworthy	Postmaster-General and Minister of Telegraphs; 1930–1931; 1928–1929	Succeeded by Joseph Ward
New Zealand Parliament
Preceded by John A. Lee	Member of Parliament for Auckland East; 1928–1931	Succeeded by Bill Schramm
