= Alice Basten =

Alice Henrietta Gertrude Basten JP (24 January 1876 – 6 March 1955) was one of the first prominent female accountants in New Zealand, businesswoman and local politician.

== Early life ==
Basten was born in Auckland, New Zealand, on 24 January 1876. She was one of five children and her parents were Rachel Lang and George John Basten. Her mother supported the family by running a boarding house after her father died in 1893. Her mother later bought another boarding house in 1914 and ran both simultaneously.

== Career ==
She had moved to the Coromandel Peninsula in New Zealand by 1989 to work as a secretary to a mining engineer, Francis Hodge, until he closed his office in Coromandel in 1904. She was also part of the Mutual Improvement Society while she lived in Coromandel. Basten then returned to Auckland and by 1910, she had opened an accounting business with her sister Caroline. They were the only female public auditors and accountants in New Zealand for several years. By 1911, Basten and Caroline had both qualified as Public Accountants of New Zealand. Their business was also incorporated as a college and they taught hundreds of women. The business was open until the 1940s although the college closed in 1922.

Basten became the third woman to be elected to the Auckland City Council in 1927. She focused on many issues for women such as the building of female restrooms and for women to be allowed to carry collapsible prams onto trams but was also part of the Parks and Reserves Committee and the Library Committee. She was a councillor on the Auckland City Council until 1935.

She was also part of several organisations for women and the community such as the Auckland Hospital Auxiliary, of which she was the representative during the early 1920s at the Auckland branch of the National Council of Women of New Zealand. She became the executive of the Auckland branch in 1924 and branch vice president in 1925. She joined the Auckland Unemployed Women's Emergency Committee in June 1931 but resigned in October alongside Miriam Soljak and Alice Cossey in protest of the lack of funds. She joined a community group led by Elsie Andrews in 1934 representing teachers to the third conference of the Pan-Pacific Women's Association.

In January 1931, she was made a Justice of the Peace and in 1935, she was awarded the King George V Silver Jubilee Medal.

She died on 6 March 1955 in Auckland.
