= Tom Bloodworth =

New Zealand politician

The Honourable Tom Bloodworth OBE
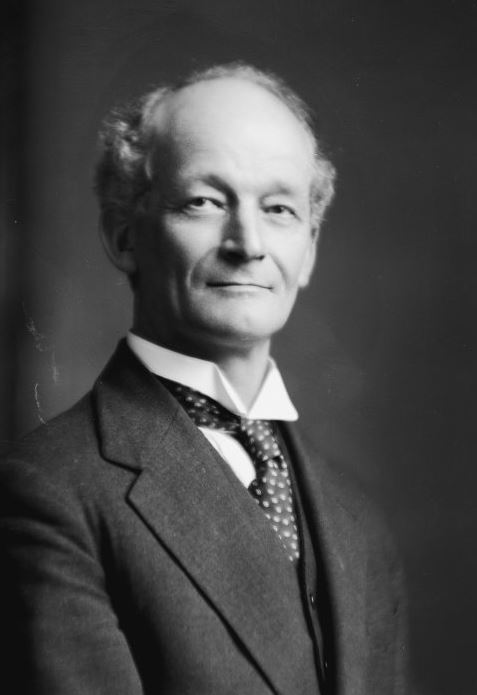
- Bloodworth in 1943

Member of the New Zealand Legislative Council
- In office 22 June 1934 – 31 December 1950
- Nominated by: George Forbes

Personal details
- Born: Thomas Bloodworth; 10 February 1882 Maxey, Northamptonshire, England
- Died: 11 May 1974 (aged 92) Remuera, New Zealand
- Party: Labour
- Spouse: Rhoda Bloodworth
- Children: 1
- Profession: Carpenter

Thomas Bloodworth OBE (10 February 1882 – 11 May 1974) was a New Zealand politician. He was a Member of the Legislative Council and its last Chairman of Committees.

== Political career ==
Born in Maxey, Northamptonshire in 1882, Bloodworth was a member of the British Independent Labour Party and came to New Zealand in 1907. He joined the Auckland Socialist Party in 1910 and was Secretary of the Auckland Carpenters' Union (1914–1936). Bloodworth helped found the Auckland WEA (Workers' Educational Association) and was Auckland Vice-President of the Land Values League.

He stood as the NZLP candidate for Parnell in 1919 and again at the 1930 by-election. Bloodworth was an Auckland City Councillor for a total of 33 years:1919–1927 and 1928–1931 (Labour); 1931–1938 (Independent); and 1953–1968 (Citizens and Ratepayers). He was also a member of the Auckland Electric Power Board and Chairman of the Auckland Harbour Board. Bloodworth broke with the New Zealand communist Party in the 1930s. He was a member of the New Zealand Legislative Council for three terms over 16 years from 22 June 1934 to its abolition in 1950. He was the Council's last Chairman of Committees between 5 July and 31 December 1950.

In 1935, Bloodworth was awarded the King George V Silver Jubilee Medal, and in 1953 he was awarded the Queen Elizabeth II Coronation Medal. He was appointed an Officer of the Order of the British Empire, for services to local government, in the 1966 Queen's Birthday Honours.

Bloodworth retired from civic life in 1968, at the age of 86. He died on 11 May 1974 in Remuera, Auckland at the age of 92.

== Notes ==
Political offices
Preceded by Michael Connelly	Chairman of Committees of the Legislative Council; 1950	Legislative Council abolished
