= Charles Philip Littlejohn =

Clerk of the New Zealand House of Representatives (1923–2014)

Charles Philip Littlejohn CBE
- Official Portrait, 1985

11th Clerk of the New Zealand House of Representatives
- In office 6 January 1976 – 31 July 1985
- Preceded by: Eric Alwyn Rousell
- Succeeded by: David McGee

Deputy Clerk
- In office 9 September 1974 – 5 January 1976
- Preceded by: New office
- Succeeded by: David McGee 1984

Clerk-Assistant
- In office 2 April 1971 – 8 September 1974
- Preceded by: Eric Alwyn Rousell
- Succeeded by: D.A. Levett 1974 David McGee 1976

Personal details
- Born: 11 January 1923 Paeroa, New Zealand
- Died: 14 September 2014 (aged 91) Palmerston North, New Zealand
- Awards: Queen Elizabeth II Silver Jubilee Medal (1977); Commander of the Order of the British Empire (1985)

Charles Philip Littlejohn CBE (11 January 1923 – 14 September 2014) was the eleventh Clerk of the New Zealand House of Representatives ("Clerk of the House"). As Clerk of the House he was head of the Legislative Department, responsible for administrative services to Parliament prior to the creation of the Parliamentary Service in 1985 and the Office of the Clerk of the House of Representatives in 1988.

After studying at the Karangahake and Waitakere Primary Schools, Warkworth District High School and Helensville District High School, Littlejohn began his career in the public service on 26 February 1940, when he was appointed as a Clerical Cadet with the Lands and Survey Department in Auckland. After serving from 1941 to 1945 in the Royal New Zealand Air Force during the Second World War he returned to a clerical position with Lands and Survey and on 9 May 1950 he was appointed as a Section Clerk at the department's head office in Wellington.

He began working at the New Zealand Parliament on 14 June 1954 when he was appointed as Clerk of the Journals and Records within the Legislative Department. The memo recommending his appointment quotes the Public Service Commission's view of him as being an "able, conscientious and energetic worker, who is respectful, bright and obliging, and whose claims to advancement are well above the average".

Littlejohn was promoted to Second Clerk-Assistant and Reader on 28 May 1964 and became Clerk-Assistant on 2 April 1971. On 9 September 1974 he was appointed to the newly created position of Deputy Clerk of the House and he became Clerk of the House on 6 January 1976.

He graduated with a bachelor's degree in law from Victoria University of Wellington (VUW) in 1957 and was admitted as a Barrister and Solicitor in 1965. He completed an LL.M. (master's) degree through VUW in 1969. His LLM thesis Parliamentary Privilege in New Zealand was the first detailed study of this area of law and is still referred to by leading authorities on NZ parliamentary practice.

One of Littlejohn's first tasks as Clerk of the House was to move people who had set up camp (a "Māori Tent Embassy") in Parliament grounds in protest at Māori land confiscations by the Crown. During his nine years as Clerk of the House, Littlejohn oversaw the introduction of significantly improved services to members of Parliament and new security measures in Parliament. He also assisted in the design and construction of at least five additions to Parliament House, as well as participating on official committees overseeing the construction of the Beehive Executive Wing on the parliamentary precinct.

Littlejohn retired at the age of 62 on 31 July 1985. Littlejohn is believed to be the first non-member of Parliament to be given the honour of addressing Parliament in response to tributes accorded to him by members on his retirement as Clerk of the House.

In 1977, Littlejohn was awarded the Queen Elizabeth II Silver Jubilee Medal. In the 1985 New Year Honours, he was appointed a Commander of the Order of the British Empire, in recognition of his services as Clerk of the House of Representatives. He was later awarded the New Zealand 1990 Commemoration Medal.

Littlejohn died on 14 September 2014 at 91 years of age.
