= Grafton Bothamley =

New Zealand public servant

8th Clerk of the New Zealand House of Representatives
- In office 1 July 1945 – 31 October 1946
- Preceded by: Thomas Donald Horn Hall
- Succeeded by: Henry Nelson Dollimore

Clerk-Assistant
- In office 1 July 1933 – 30 June 1945
- Preceded by: W.E. Dasent
- Succeeded by: Henry Nelson Dollimore

Second Clerk-Assistant & Reader
- In office 1 June 1932 – 30 June 1933
- Preceded by: Walter Collings
- Succeeded by: Henry Nelson Dollimore

Personal details
- Born: Grafton Francis Bothamley; 9 May 1880 Wellington, New Zealand
- Died: 12 June 1956 (aged 76) Wellington, New Zealand
- Relations: Arthur Thomas Bothamley (father)
- Awards: King George V Silver Jubilee Medal (1935)

Grafton Francis Bothamley (9 May 1880 – 12 June 1956) was the eighth Clerk of the New Zealand House of Representatives ("Clerk of the House"). As Clerk of the House he was head of the Legislative Department, responsible for administrative services to Parliament prior to the creation of the Parliamentary Service in 1985 and the Office of the Clerk of the House of Representatives in 1988.

== Education and early career ==
Bothamley was educated at the Terrace School, Wellington, Wellington College, and the Royal Naval College, Greenwich. After finishing his studies he worked with the Mutual Life Association of Australasia from 1897 to 1906.

== Military service ==
In 1916 Bothamley enlisted with New Zealand Naval Forces and served in the North Sea during the First World War, with the Royal Naval Volunteer Reserve, rising to the rank of Lieutenant.

During the Second World War (from 3 August 1940 to 30 April 1943) Bothamley served with the Royal Naval Volunteer Reserve as a shipping identification officer, based in Wellington and holding the rank of Lieutenant-Commander.

== Parliamentary career ==
Bothamley began his parliamentary career in 1906 when he was appointed as a Committee Clerk, servicing the Local Bills Committee and ad hoc committees. In 1910 he was clerk for the special committee established to investigate allegations of impropriety by members of Parliament ("the Hine Allegations") made by John Bird Hine, the member for the Stratford electorate. At that time this investigation was one of the longest parliamentary investigations in the history of the New Zealand Parliament.

Bothamley was initially a sessional employee, which meant that he was not employed by Parliament during recesses, when the House of Representatives was not sitting. During such times he would find work with other government agencies such as with the Registrar-General, where he was employed as a Census Clerk in 1911/1912. It was not until 1 June 1913 that he was permanently appointed as a Committee Clerk, and on 19 July 1915 he was promoted to the position of Reader and Clerk of Bills and Papers.

After World War I Bothamley returned to his position at Parliament and, on 1 June 1932, he was promoted to Second Clerk Assistant and Reader. He acted as Serjeant-at-Arms for 12 weeks following the retirement of Major H.H. Browne in 1932. On 1 July 1933 he was appointed as Clerk-Assistant, following the retirement of W.E. Dasent. For three months during 1936 Bothamley acted as Clerk of the House during the absence overseas of Thomas Donald Horn Hall.

On 1 July 1945 Bothamley was appointed as Clerk of the House, following the retirement of Thomas Donald Horn Hall. Hall was the first legally qualified Clerk; at the time of his appointment in 1930, Speaker of the House, Sir Charles Ernest Statham, had insisted that the holder of the role should be a qualified lawyer, and this view was endorsed by the subsequent Speaker William Edward Barnard. As Bothamley did not have a legal qualification and was 65 years of age at the time of his appointment as Clerk of the House, he was appointed on the understanding that he would retire "within a reasonable time after the termination of [WWII] hostilities".

While Bothamley was Clerk of the House the end of the 27th New Zealand Parliament's three-year term was inadvertently reached, causing the Parliament to run its full legal course for the first (and, to date, only) time. The effect of this was that the 27th Parliament was allowed to expire before it could be dissolved by the Governor-General, thereby casting doubt on the validity of legislation that was given the Royal Assent after Parliament had expired, and on the legality of subsequent parliamentary elections. These matters were eventually considered by the Court of Appeal in the case Simpson v Attorney-General, with the court upholding the validity of both matters, despite finding that, due to Parliament being allowed to expire, the subsequent elections had not been held in accordance with the timetable required by the Electoral Act 1927.

After serving as Clerk of the House for one year and four months, Bothamley retired on 31 October 1946, at 66 years of age, following 40 years' service.

== Bothamley dynasty ==
The Bothamley family had a close association with the New Zealand Parliament that spanned almost 80 years. In 1871 Grafton's father Arthur Thomas Bothamley ISO joined the office of the New Zealand Legislative Council serving as both Clerk-Assistant and then Clerk of the Legislative Council. He was also Private Secretary to Premier Sir John Hall, Clerk of Parliaments, and for 45 years he was the Legislative Council's Gentleman Usher of the Black Rod. Grafton's brother Charles Mildmay Bothamley began working in Parliament in 1917 and retired as the last Clerk of the New Zealand Legislative Council and Clerk of Parliaments in 1950.

== Awards ==
In 1935 Bothamley was awarded the King George V Silver Jubilee Medal.

== Death ==
Bothamley (known to his friends as "Old Bot") died at the age of 76 on 12 June 1956, as a result of a motor vehicle accident in Wellington. His body was cremated at Karori Crematorium.
