= Eric Roussell =

Eric Roussell QSO
- Taken March 1971

10th Clerk of the New Zealand House of Representatives
- In office 2 April 1971 – 5 January 1976
- Preceded by: Henry Nelson Dollimore
- Succeeded by: Charles Philip Littlejohn

Clerk-Assistant
- In office 1 March 1947 – 1 April 1971
- Preceded by: Henry Nelson Dollimore
- Succeeded by: Charles Philip Littlejohn

Employment Officer (PSC Office)
- In office 1 July 1946 – 28 February 1947

Personal details
- Born: Eric Alwyn Roussell; 1 October 1911 Auckland, New Zealand
- Died: 19 August 1977 (aged 65)
- Awards: Companion of the Queen's Service Order (1976)

Eric Alwyn Roussell QSO (1 October 1911 – 19 August 1977) was the tenth Clerk of the New Zealand House of Representatives ("Clerk of the House"). As Clerk of the House he was head of the Legislative Department, responsible for administrative services to Parliament prior to the creation of the Parliamentary Service in 1985 and the Office of the Clerk of the House of Representatives in 1988.

Roussell, son of the Philip George Roussell, General manager of the New Zealand Railways Department, was educated at Wellington College (New Zealand). He began his career in the public service when he was appointed as a Clerical Cadet with the Audit Department in Wellington on 21 January 1929. He transferred to the Head Office of the Public Trust on 3 October 1929. While working at Public Trust he completed a Bachelor of Laws degree at Victoria University of Wellington, graduating in 1936 (together with his predecessor Henry Nelson Dollimore).

From 1942 to 1945 he served in the Pacific as a Flight-Lieutenant with the Royal New Zealand Air Force (RNZAF) during the Second World War. During this service he worked as an intelligence officer and was mentioned in dispatches.

After Roussell completed three year's service with the RNZAF he was, on 14 September 1945, appointed as Officer in Charge of the Education Section of the Rehabilitation Department. On 1 July 1946 he was appointed as an Employment Officer with the Office of the Public Service Commissioner.

He began working at the New Zealand Parliament on 1 March 1947 when, at 35 years of age, he was appointed as Clerk-Assistant within the Legislative Department, a position he held for 24 years. He became Clerk of the House on 2 April 1971 following the retirement of Henry Nelson Dollimore.

After almost five years as Clerk of the House, Roussell retired at 64 years of age on 5 January 1976.

In 1953, Rousell was awarded the Queen Elizabeth II Coronation Medal. In the 1976 New Year Honours, he was appointed a Companion of the Queen's Service Order for public services.

Roussell died on 19 August 1977 at 65 years of age.
