= David Wilson (parliamentary official) =

New Zealand public servant

- Wilson in 2017

14th Clerk of the New Zealand House of Representatives
- Incumbent
- Assumed office 6 July 2015
- Preceded by: Mary Harris

Clerk-Assistant
- In office February 2008 – July 2015

Personal details
- Born: David Martin Wilson; 1970 (age 55–56) Lawrence, New Zealand

David Martin Wilson is a New Zealand public servant who is the fourteenth and current Clerk of the New Zealand House of Representatives ("Clerk of the House") since 2015. He was appointed to an initial seven-year term which was renewed for a further seven years in 2022.

== Early life and education ==
David Wilson grew up in Dunedin and was educated at St Pauls High School and the University of Otago, where he graduated with a Bachelor of Arts (with Honours, majoring in History) degree in 1991 and a Master of Arts (History) in 1993. While working in Wellington he continued his studies at Massey University, graduating with a Master of Management degree in 2004.

In July 2024, Wilson completed a PhD thesis at Victoria University of Wellington entitled "Influences on parliamentary procedure in New Zealand 1935 - 2015," which examined the history of parliamentary procedure in New Zealand.

== Public service career ==
Wilson has also held policy roles in the public sector. He started his parliamentary career in 1994 as a select committee report writer. He was appointed as a Parliamentary Officer with the Office of the Clerk of the House of Representatives in February 1995. He left the Office of the Clerk of the House in July 1999 to become a Senior Policy Analyst with the Department for Courts. In February 2002 he was appointed as a Senior Policy Analyst (Censorship) with the Department of Internal Affairs and in November 2004 he became the Information and Policy manager with the-then Office of Film and Literature Classification.

In February 2008 he re-joined the Office of the Clerk of the House as a Clerk-Assistant, initially with responsibility for provision of services to Select Committees, and from February 2013 with responsibility for the House Services group. From 2012 to 2015, Wilson was the President of the Australia and New Zealand Association of Clerks-at-the-Table.

=== Clerk of the House of Representatives ===
Wilson was appointed to a seven-year term as Clerk of the House on 6 July 2015, following the retirement of Mary Harris. In May 2022, he was reappointed for a further seven-year term, beginning on 6 July 2022.

On 10 December 2024, Wilson advised Assistant Speaker Barbara Kuriger that the listing of projects under the Fast-track Approvals Bill benefitted specific people and should thus be classified as private legislation and removed from the final version of the Bill. The Sixth National Government disagreed and recalled Speaker Gerry Brownlee who overruled Kuriger and resintated the list. The Fast-track Approval Bill subsequently passed its third reading on 17 December 2024.

In February 2026, Wilson directed his office to cease use of the official account of the Parliament of New Zealand on X (formerly Twitter), citing the Grok sexual deepfake scandal. The decision was criticised by deputy prime minister Winston Peters and the Free Speech Union.
