= Francis Campbell (disambiguation) =

Francis Campbell (born 1970) is a British diplomat and academic.

Francis Campbell may also refer to:

- Francis Campbell (cricketer) (1867–1929), Australian cricketer
- Francis Campbell (politician) (1829–?), American politician
- Francis Joseph Campbell (1832–1914), American anti-slavery campaigner
- Francis Eastwood Campbell (1823–1911), Clerk of the New Zealand House of Representatives
- Francis Maule Campbell (1844–1920), figure in the history of association and rugby football

== See also ==
- Frank Campbell (disambiguation)
