= George Friend (parliamentary official) =

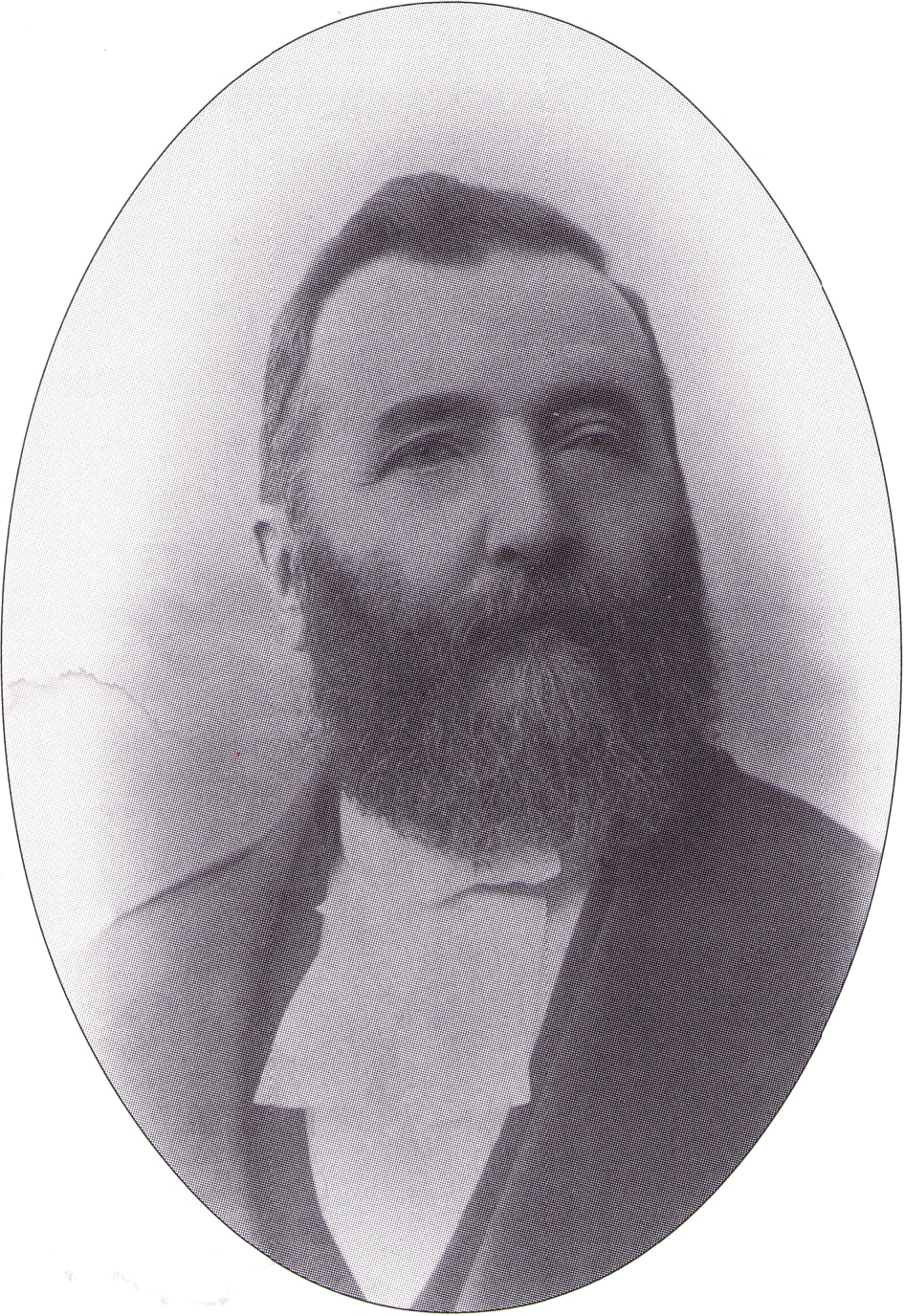
- Taken 1890

3rd Clerk of the New Zealand House of Representatives
- In office 1 October 1889 – 19 July 1898
- Preceded by: Francis Eastwood Campbell
- Succeeded by: Henry Otterson

Clerk-Assistant
- In office 1 October 1864 – 30 September 1889
- Preceded by: Henry William Tyler
- Succeeded by: Henry Otterson

Accountant: Native Land Purchase Department
- In office 1858–1863

Personal details
- Born: 1835
- Died: 19 July 1898 (aged 63) Thorndon, Wellington
- Resting place: St Mary's Churchyard Karori
- Spouse: Matilda Hynes
- Children: Catherine "Maud" Baldwin (nee Friend)

George Friend (1835 – 19 July 1898) was the third Clerk of the New Zealand House of Representatives ("Clerk of the House"), serving in this office for 9 years from 1889. He held positions in the New Zealand public service and Parliament for 45 years until his death at 63 years of age.

== Family and arrival in New Zealand ==
Friend was born in London in 1835. He was the eldest son of George Friend, who was an official of the East India Company, and later Accountant-General for India.

Friend is reported to have boarded the Hamilla Mitchell in London on or about 6 August 1853, arriving in Auckland New Zealand on 30 November 1853. He brought letters of introduction, which he presented to Sir George Grey shortly before the end of his first term as Governor.

In 1865 Friend married Matilda Hynes. Their only child, daughter Catherine Maud (known as Maud), was born in Pipitia Street, Thorndon on 15 April 1876. In February 1902 Maud became engaged to Vawdrey Baldwin, a solicitor from Palmerston North. The couple were married on 24 September 1902. As Maud's father died in 1898, Speaker Sir Maurice O'Rorke gave the bride away.

== Education and early career ==
Friend received his early education at a private school at Leatherhead and then attended King's College London, before entering Trinity College, Cambridge.

The year after Friend's arrival in New Zealand, the Administrator of the Government Robert Wynyard appointed him as an Extra Clerk in the Colonial Secretary's (Andrew Sinclair's) Department, with effect from 4 May 1854. In January 1855 Friend was transferred to the Office of the Auditor General and, in June 1855, he was promoted to the position of Second Clerk.

From 1858 to 1863 Friend was the accountant for the Land Purchase Department and the Native Minister's Office.

== Parliamentary career ==
On 28 April 1862 Speaker Sir David Monro wrote to the Colonial Secretary William Fox requesting that Fox inform Governor George Grey that he (Monro) recommended Friend to fill the vacancy of Clerk-Assistant to the House of Representatives (vice Henry William Tyler, who had resigned). Fox wrote a strongly worded letter back to Monro, objecting to him "claim[ing] for the Speaker the right of recommending this or any other appointment independently of the Responsible Ministers". Fox went on to state that Friend's workload meant that he could not at that time be released from his position as accountant for the Land Purchase Department and "some considerable time will probably elapse before Mr Friend's services can be dispensed with, should the Government then, in reference to other considerations, be prepared to acquiesce in your recommendation".

Friend's appointment as Clerk-Assistant was eventually gazetted on 7 October 1864. The effective date of Friend's appointment as Clerk-Assistant is unclear (he may have been acting in this role for a short period before his official appointment). However he served as Clerk-Assistant to Clerk of the House Major Campbell for at least 25 years, moving to Wellington when Parliament relocated from Auckland in 1865.

When, in 1889, Major Campbell announced his retirement the Evening Post noted that "There can, we should think, and hope, be no doubt as to who Major Campbell's successor will be as Clerk to the House of Representatives. Everyone who is familiar with the House and its work will at once designate Mr. George Friend, the present Clerk Assistant, as the proper man to receive the promotion. Mr. Friend is a very old servant of the House, and has had charge of all its work in Committee of the Whole for upwards of a quarter of a century, occasionally also relieving Major Campbell in the chair at the table. He is thoroughly familiar with Parliamentary law and procedure, is a recognised authority on the history and precedents of the New Zealand Parliament, and he is a universal favourite with all with whom he is brought into official contact."

Friend's appointment as Clerk of the House was gazetted on 14 November 1889, with effect from 1 October 1889. At the beginning of the fourth session of the tenth Parliament Speaker Sir Maurice O'Rorke announced to the House that the Governor (William Hillier, Earl of Onslow) had accepted his recommendation that Friend be appointed as Clerk of the House.

Friend suffered ill-health during his term as Clerk of the House. In June 1893 he was reported to have been "very seriously ill... suffering from an internal inflammation". In December 1893 he was again reported to be seriously ill, suffering from an internal complaint and recovering from an operation. In June 1898, at the start of the third session of the thirteenth Parliament Speaker Sir Maurice O'Rorke announced to the House that, on medical advice, he had granted Friend two months' "leave of absence, hoping that in that time a cure might be effected and health restored."

Friend died in office on 19 July 1898, at 63 years of age, after serving the House for at least 34 years, including almost 9 years as Clerk of the House. He had served as Clerk of the House under two different Speakers: Sir George Maurice O'Rorke and Sir William Jukes Steward.

== Other interests ==
In 1858 Friend was involved in establishing the Auckland Dispensary (a medical centre for the "laboring class... who, in case of sickness, would, in many instances, be unable to obtain professional assistance for themselves or families") and he served as secretary for the management committee for a period from 1859.

Friend and Francis Eastwood Campbell (the second Clerk of the House) were members of the management committee of the Auckland Club, one of the first gentlemen's clubs established in New Zealand.

After moving to Wellington in 1865, Friend owned both a house in Thorndon (63 Thorndon Quay) and a large house on 13.75 acres of land (on which he kept horses) in Karori. The Karori house is believed to have been located at what is now 70 Friend Street.

In 1891 Friend was appointed as a Justice of the Peace.

== Death ==
Friend died at his home in Thorndon at about 9am on 19 July 1898. The cause of death was reported as being "a glandular swelling, which developed into a painful tumour". Obituaries and reports of his large funeral were published in numerous newspapers.

Members paid tribute to Friend when his death was announced in the House that afternoon, Speaker Sir Maurice O'Rorke stating: "He was a most zealous and painstaking officer, and I could always rely with the fullest confidence upon the accuracy with which his work was performed". The House agreed a motion proposed by Premier Richard Seddon: "to record its high sense of the faithful services rendered to the House of Representatives during thirty-five years by the late Mr George Friend, as Clerk-Assistant and Clerk of the House of Representatives". As a mark of respect the House then adjourned without dealing with any further business. Friend's widow and daughter received a compassionate grant from the government of 900 pounds (about a year's salary).

Friend is buried at Karori (St Mary's) Churchyard.
