= James Campbell (land commissioner) =

British military officer

Lieutenant-Colonel James Campbell

Registrar of Deeds for Canterbury
- In office 5 October 1853 – 19 December 1854
- Preceded by: William Guise Brittan
- Succeeded by: Christopher Alderson Calvert

Commissioner of Crown Lands etc for Canterbury
- In office 27 September 1851 – 4 October 1853
- Preceded by: New office
- Succeeded by: William Guise Brittan

Officer of the British Army
- In office 2 October 1801 – c. 1823

Personal details
- Born: 1787
- Died: 7 July 1858 (aged 71) Christchurch, New Zealand
- Resting place: Barbadoes Street Cemetery
- Spouse: Charlotte Alicia
- Relations: Dame Adelaide Mary Anderson (granddaughter)
- Children: Major Francis Eastwood Campbell, Blanche Emily Anderson (nee Campbell)

Lieutenant-Colonel James Campbell (1787 – 7 July 1858) was a lieutenant-colonel of the British army who distinguished himself in the Peninsular War. He emigrated to New Zealand and was appointed as a land commissioner, and later as Registrar of Deeds, in Canterbury.

== British Army career ==
Campbell was born in 1787. He descends from the Campbells of Skerrington at Cumnock in East Ayrshire, Scotland.

Campbell was an officer with the 45th and the 50th Regiment of Foot, serving in the 3rd Division and the 7th Division. He joined the British Army at a young age, purchasing ensign and lieutenant commissions with the 45th Regiment on 2 October 1801. He was appointed as an adjutant on 12 November 1803, captain on 29 December 1808, brevet major on 3 March 1814 and lieutenant colonel on 21 January 1819.

In 1806 Campbell sailed with the 45th regiment as part of Major-general Robert Craufurd's unsuccessful campaign to South America as part of the British invasions of the River Plate. In 1807 he was taken prisoner during the second battle of Buenos Ayres (Argentina); he was released and (after 75 weeks away from home) evacuated back to Ireland when the commanding officer Lieutenant-general John Whitelocke surrendered and agreed to withdraw from the River Plate and Montevideo (Uruguay).

In 1808 he sailed with his regiment to Portugal for the Peninsular War on the Iberian Peninsula and saw action in the battles of Roliça (17 August 1808), Vimeiro (21 August 1808) and Talavera (July 1809), after which he returned to England for a short period.

In 1810 he returned to Portugal with the 45th Regiment and, as part of the 3rd Division commanded by Lieutenant-general Sir Thomas Picton, fought in the battles of Bussaco (September 1810), Sabugal (April 1811), Fuentes de Oñoro (May 1811), El Bodón (September 1811), Ciudad Rodrigo (January 1812), Badajoz (March – April 1812, where he was appointed as brigade major for Major-General Sir James Kempt's brigade), Salamanca (July 1812), and Buen Retiro Palace (Madrid, August 1812, where a significant French garrison was surrendered).

Serving in the 3rd Division in the same brigade, now commanded by Major-general Sir Thomas Brisbane, he fought in the battles of Vitoria (June 1813), the Pyrenees (July – August 1813), Nivelle (November 1813), Nive (December 1813), Orthez (February 1814, where he was promoted to the rank of major), and Toulouse (April 1814).

After Napoleon's surrender in April 1814, Campbell sailed from Bordeaux for North America to serve in the American War of 1812. As brigade major for Major-General Sir Thomas Brisbane's brigade, he took part in the Battle of Plattsburgh in September 1814.

In July 1815 he returned to France and was brigade major for a brigade in the 7th Division and, on the formation of the Army of Occupation in France, to the 1st brigade in the 3rd Division. When the occupation force was reduced in 1817 he returned to Ireland.

According to Burnham and McGuigan Campbell was one of only 15 men to receive 14 or more clasps on the Military General Service Medal. His obituary in the Nelson Examiner and New Zealand Chronicle states:

"The ranks of Major and Lieutenant-Colonel were successively conferred on him for his services in the field, and he had also the honour of receiving a war medal different from those usually conferred, and no fewer than fourteen clasps, (being one more than any officer in the British service had been honoured with)."

In 1840, Campbell published the book A British army, as it was, – is, – and ought to be, which recounts some of his experience in the Peninsular War and the Battle of Plattsburgh (see Bibliography below). In Volume 1 of Excursions, Adventures, and Field-sports in Ceylon Campbell notes that, from the start of his service in the army, he was in the habit of keeping a journal. However the night before the Battle of Talavera, thinking that he would be likely to die the next day and not wanting his journal to fall into enemy hands, he burnt it, and thus destroyed the record of events from the previous eight years.

In February 1819, after promotion to the rank of lieutenant-colonel, Campbell sailed with a command of 300 men to Ceylon. For two years he was the commander of the Galle District and then for a further period he was commander and Judicial Officer (Magistrate) of the Sath (Seven) Korles district.

He repeatedly became ill in Ceylon from jungle fever and had to return England, where he sold his commission and retired from the army.

== Family and post-army life ==
Campbell was married to Charlotte Alicia and had two children, a son and a daughter. His son, Major Francis Eastwood Campbell, was Clerk of the New Zealand House of Representatives for 35 years. Campbell's daughter, Blanche Emily, married AG Anderson. Campbell's granddaughter from his daughter's marriage was Dame Adelaide Mary Anderson.

After Campbell returned from Ceylon (around 1823) he resided at Ravensdale Estate in the parish of Ballaugh on the Isle of Man, where he was appointed as a magistrate. Around 1846 Lieutenant Governor John Ready selected Campbell to serve as a member of the House of Keys. However Campbell refused to attend the swearing in at Castle Rushen as he disagreed with the way in which members of the House of Keys were appointed, having previously been a signatory to a petition to Queen Victoria requesting that she change the appointment process.

During this period Campbell wrote books on the British army (published 1840), Ceylon (two volumes in 1843) and Ireland (published 1847). See Bibliography below for further details.

== Emigration to New Zealand ==
Campbell had mixed fortunes after leaving the army. He became interested in matters relating to British colonisation of lands such as New Zealand. In Excursions, Adventures, and Field-sports in Ceylon (Preface and Appendix O of Volume 1 and chapter 13 of Volume 2 – see Bibliography below) he set out his views on colonisation, including the merits of providing colonists with cheap passage, land and labour (including convict labour).

Campbell was appointed to the Committee of Management of the Society of Canterbury Colonists when it was formed in London on 25 April 1850. The Society was formed "for the purpose of making suggestions and expressing the opinions of the Colonists upon matters relating to the welfare of the proposed Colony" being established by the Canterbury Association in Canterbury New Zealand. The other members of the Society's first Committee of Management were Guise Brittan (Chairman), James FitzGerald, Rev Dr Thomas Rowley, Henry Phillips, Henry Sewell, Conway Lucas Rose and Edward Ward (brother of Crosbie Ward), who was appointed secretary of the society. After elections on 18 July 1850 C L Rose and Rev Dr Thomas Rowley were replaced on the Committee by Leslie Lee, Charles Maunsell, John Watts Russell, Henry John Tancred, James Townsend and Felix Wakefield; however, Lee and Sewell immediately vacated their appointments.

Later in 1850 Campbell fell out with the Society of Canterbury Colonists. On 17 August 1850 Edward Gibbon Wakefield wrote to John Robert Godley, calling Campbell a "mere self-seeker, but hardly a respectable, perhaps a very discreditable one: all wrong about money-matters, and very incompetent to boot" and advising Godley to keep Campbell "at full arms length".

On 1 November 1851 the Lyttelton Times (under the editorship of James FitzGerald) reported that Campbell:

"joined the Canterbury scheme... in the hope of obtaining appointment of Resident Magistrate in the settlement; he professed himself a warm advocate of the plan of the colony, and announced his intention of purchasing land largely; he even took cabins in Sir George Seymour, which were retained for him for a considerable time; he was in constant communication with the colonists for many weeks; and [when] he was not recommended to the appointment he wished to obtain, or any other appointment,... he ceased to frequent the colonists' rooms in London, gave up his cabins, bought no land, and in a short time after the sailing of the first four ships, he left England, and was lost sight of until he turned up in Auckland."

Campbell boarded the Victory in London on 10 October 1850, arriving in Auckland on or about 1 February 1851. He was accompanied on the voyage by his wife, son Francis Eastwood Campbell, his daughter Blanche Emily and a servant.

== Controversial commissionership appointments ==
Campbell came to New Zealand with recommendations from the British government. On 27 September 1851 Governor of New Zealand George Grey appointed him as a Magistrate of the Province of New Munster, and to the three separate commissionerships within the "Middle District of the Middle [i.e. South] Island": Commissioner of Crown Lands under the Crown Lands Ordinance (excluding the Canterbury District), Commissioner for hearing claims under the New Zealand Company's Land Claimant's Ordinance and Commissioner for investigating and reporting upon claims to Land under the Land Claims Ordinance. As a result of the Parliament of the United Kingdom passing the New Zealand Constitution Act 1852 the Provinces of New Zealand came into effect on 17 January 1853. The boundaries of the Canterbury Province were gazetted on 28 February 1853 and Campbell then became the "Commissioner of Crown Lands for the Province of Canterbury, exclusive of the Canterbury Block"

Campbell's commissionership appointments gave him responsibility for adjudicating land claims for around half of the South Island; from Kaikōura and Westport in the north, to Glenavy and Cascade Point in the south. He also had responsibility for issuing pasturage licences on Crown Land outside the block of land purchased by the Canterbury Association (the "Canterbury Block"). As Commissioner of Crown Lands he issued over 50 pasturage licences covering an area of over one million acres. Unfortunately these licences were later declared invalid and quashed, creating considerable confusion and litigation. His outward letter-book contains more than 200 letters covering the period October 1851 to November 1853.

It is possible that Grey's antipathy towards the Canterbury Association led him to appoint Campbell in order to frustrate the plans of the Colonists and delay the settlement of claims and the issuing of pasturage licences. Certainly Campbell, and George Grey's appointment of him as Commissioner, were strongly criticised by the press and prominent colonists. The Lyttelton Times and the Daily Southern Cross published articles stating:

"There never was a more unfortunate or more offensive appointment than that of Col. Campbell... he was considered by all who came in contact with him to be wholly incompetent to discharge the duties of any responsible station... there could hardly have been found another man whose presence within this settlement, as an official, would have been so offensive to its inhabitants."

An editorial in the Otago Witness expressed similar views about Campbell and added that his "gross ignorance" and "hostility to the [Canterbury] scheme" made him "an object of derision, sorrow and dislike". The Nelson Examiner and New Zealand Chronicle complained about the large area of land that Campbell was expected to administer and that his office was in Christchurch, while the Lyttelton Times harshly criticised the language and grammar Campbell used in his official notices.

Henry Sewell described Campbell on 21 April 1853 as that:

"doited old idiot who is about as fit to be Crown Commissioner as he is to be Lord Chancellor. He is in truth a compound of conceit, stupidity, ignorance and self importance, with a total incapacity for business of the meanest kind; withal he is mischievous and malignant; altogether as great an infliction on the poor Province of Canterbury as could have been sent, and for this Canterbury has to thank the tender mercies of Sir Geo. Grey."

William Travers sarcastically referred to him as a "genius" and Charlotte Godley (the wife of "father of Canterbury" John Robert Godley) described Campbell in letters to her mother by saying:

"There is a certain old Colonel Campbell, who had many dealings with the C. Assoc. in early days, and ended by quarrelling with everyone and writing an insulting letter to Lord Lyttelton, after innumerable statements on his part had turned out to be perfectly false... He is naturally predisposed to dislike the plan, and the Colonists, and goes about abusing the place, the land, and all belonging to it, to anyone who will listen to him. The new-comers are his especial prey...he is a very bad element in our society. He is now going over to Akaroa to decide summarily certain claims of some of the old settlers there, and my husband intends to go over and watch what he is about; he can hardly help making mistakes, as he has no knowledge whatever of his subject... vexatious, underhand way of doing business... an overweening idea of his own importance..."

Howard Jacobson, owner of the Akaroa Mail and Banks Peninsula Advertiser (father of Ethel May Jacobson), later wrote:

"Colonel Campbell did not make things at all pleasant for the Canterbury Association settlers. He was a disappointed man, having taken great interest in the foundation of the settlement when in London, and fully expected to be appointed first agent, a post that was afterwards given to Mr. Godley."

Alfred Hamish Reed notes that Campbell:

"was looked upon by his fellows as a renegade. He had further aroused the hostility of the leaders of the settlement by his decisions on certain "pre-Adamite" [i.e. settlers that had arrived before the first Canterbury Association ships in December 1850] Banks Peninsula land claims, and by his support for Sir George Grey's cheap land policy."

Johannes Carl Andersen notes that at least some of the Canterbury Colonists' criticism of Campbell appears to have been warranted:

"The Colonel wrote in a very minute, nervous hand and his letters were extraordinarily diffuse, even as compared with other letters in those days of formal long-drawn-out and often tedious official correspondence... He located his office at Akaroa (some 50 miles by bush track from the main settlement at Christchurch) and sometimes published instructions to Canterbury stock-owners in the Wellington Spectator" (i.e. in the New Zealand Spectator and Cook's Strait Guardian, a Wellington publication).

== Candidacy for the first election for Superintendent of the Canterbury Province ==
In February 1853 Campbell stood for election to the newly created office of Superintendent of the Canterbury Province. He campaigned strongly, his catchcry being "cheap land, cheap bread and no Chinese labour".

The price of land was the dominant election issue: The business strategy of the Canterbury Association was to sell land at a price that was sufficient to finance all the development that was necessary for the new settlement. The other two candidates, James FitzGerald and Henry Tancred, were therefore both proponents of a high land price. Campbell on the other hand was in favour of setting a low price for land outside the Canterbury Block. Hence there was a real possibility that vote splitting would result in neither Tancred nor FitzGerald being elected.

Resident Magistrate for Akaroa John Watson removed Campbell from the electoral roll on the grounds that he did not believe Campbell met the property qualifications to either vote or stand for election. Captain Charles Simeon, returning officer for the election, allowed Campbell to be nominated, but at the same time impressed on electors the fact that if Campbell received the most votes he would not be declared as superintendent. Simeon stated that "all votes for Colonel Campbell would be thrown away". The New Zealand Spectator and Cook's Strait Guardian stated: "This seems to have acted very prejudicially to Colonel Campbell in the Christchurch District, where the declaration was made, and to have lost him his election."

The election result was: Fitzgerald 135 votes, Campbell 94 votes and Tancred 89 votes. Campbell was supported by the French settlers at Akaroa, where he topped the poll. He just headed off FitzGerald at Lyttelton, but the majority of Christchurch voters favoured FitzGerald.

Campbell claimed he had been unfairly beaten and took the matter of his eligibility to stand as a candidate to court. However his protest came to nothing, and Fitzgerald was declared the first Superintendent of the Canterbury Province.

== Removal from office ==
Campbell's handling of land issues resulted in Governor of New Zealand George Grey receiving a large number of complaints about Campbell, as well as voluminous correspondence from him about colonists and run-holders. Campbell did not acknowledge James FitzGerald as superintendent and, despite repeated requests, refused to provide FitzGerald a return of revenue from land leases. Gerald Hensley points out that Campbell was "maintaining with a splendid inconsistency that he had not received the Governor's dispatch instructing him to do so, even while quoting parts of it in his long and argumentative letters." During late 1853 there was a heated exchange of letters between the two men, into which Governor Grey was copied.

On 5 October 1853 Alfred Domett, who was at that time Civil Secretary for central government, told Campbell that he was relieved of his commissionerships and that he was to hand over his records to William Guise Brittan, who had been appointed in his place (Brittan was already Commissioner within the Canterbury Block so this effectively amalgamated the two Canterbury Land Offices). Campbell was instead appointed as "Registrar of Deeds for the Province of Canterbury", replacing Brittan in this role.

On 11 November 1853 the Canterbury Provincial Council, apparently unaware that Campbell had already been removed from the land commissionerships (probably because Campbell took no action to relinquish office while he appealed to the Governor), adopted the following resolution agreeing to ask the Governor of New Zealand to remove Campbell from office:

"This Council, having taken into account the various papers upon their table in reference to the proceedings of the Commissioner of Crown Lands: resolve; That the Commissioner of Crown Lands, having as it appears to this Council, acted in disregard of the law, and having refused to afford this Council any information on the affairs of his office, and having otherwise shown himself wholly incompetent to the discharge of the duties thereof, an address be presented from this Council to His Excellency the Governor, praying His Excellency to be pleased to remove Colonel Campbell from the office of Commissioner of Crown Lands."

On 23 November 1853 the Canterbury Provincial Council discussed Campbell's appointment as Registrar of Deeds. John Hall stated Campbell was "even less qualified to be Registrar of Deeds, an office which particularly required to be filled by a person of business habits." The Council then adopted the following resolutions asking Governor Grey to remove Campbell as Registrar of Deeds and to combine registration of deeds with that of births, deaths and marriages in the same office under the Deputy Registrar of the Supreme Court:

"1. That this Council has learned with great surprise and regret that Lieutenant Colonel Campbell, after having been removed from the office of Commissioner of Crown Lands, has been appointed as Registrar of Deeds for this Province. 2. That, considering how largely the interest of individuals may be affected by the Acts of the Registrar, and the extensive evil which may result from incompetence or mal-administration: this Council are of opinion that that office ought to be entrusted only to some person possessing the fullest confidence of the public. 3. The Council are of opinion that the office of Registrar of Deeds is one which ought, if possible, be filled by a person having a legal education, and that for the purposes of economy its duties might for the present be most conveniently performed by the Deputy Registrar of the Supreme Court.."

Campbell refused to register any land deeds and, when the Provincial Council complained, Campbell "denounced them as calumniators and prepared to sue the Superintendent and executive on an extraordinary variety of grounds ranging from usurpation to illegal absence from the province... [and] that the whole provincial establishment was illegal"

In December 1854 (after George Grey had completed his first term as Governor of New Zealand) the central Government finally agreed to the removal of Campbell from office. The grounds for his removal were "general unfitness for the duties of his office, willful and continued neglect of duty and a determined spirit of opposition and resistance to the Provincial Government, and disrespect towards its executive officers." Superintendent James FitzGerald appointed lawyer and court registrar Christopher Alderson Calvert as Registrar of Deeds in place of Campbell.

== Further litigation, retirement and death ==
Campbell went on to sue Superintendent of the Province of Canterbury James FitzGerald for libel on the grounds that he had been defamed in FitzGerald's letter to Governor of New Zealand George Grey while seeking Campbell's removal from office. Fitzgerald's letter to the Governor said "I request the removal of an officer who has been condemned by the united voice of the public as wholly unfit to be entrusted with any public office whatever". Campbell initially won the case but the verdict was overturned on appeal on the basis that FitzGerald's letter to the Governor was privileged, that Campbell had not proven that FitzGerald acted in malice, and that Campbell had misstated the alleged libel.

After removal as Land Commissioner Campbell is reported to have lived at Isabella (AKA Isabel) Lodge, an "elegant and commodious house" located on Isabel Farm on Ferry Road, Christchurch, the property of Alexander 'Russian' Sherwood Jackson and his wife Isabella Mary Jackson.

Campbell died in Christchurch aged 71, on 7 July 1858. The cause of death was stated as apoplexy He is buried with his wife at Barbadoes Street Cemetery in Christchurch. Obituaries appeared in several papers.

== Bibliography ==
- Campbell, James (1840). A British army, as it was, – is, – and ought to be. London: T. & W. Boone.
- Campbell, James (1843). Excursions, Adventures, and Field-sports in Ceylon: Its Commercial and Military Importance, and Numerous Advantages to the British Emigrant, Volumes 1 & 2. London: T. & W. Boone. For a synopsis see the Foreign and Colonial Quarterly Review, Volume 2, 1843.
- Campbell, James (1847). Ireland: its history, past and present elucidated. London: T. & W. Boone.
