= Mary Harris (public servant) =

New Zealand public servant and parliamentary officer

Mary Harris QSO
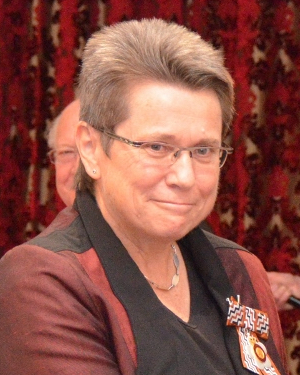
- Harris in 2014

13th Clerk of the New Zealand House of Representatives
- In office 10 December 2007 – 5 July 2015
- Preceded by: David McGee
- Succeeded by: David Wilson

Deputy Clerk
- In office 11 February 2002 – 9 December 2007
- Preceded by: Ailsa Salt
- Succeeded by: Debra June Angus

Clerk-Assistant
- In office 6 March 1990 – 10 February 2002

Personal details
- Born: Mary Winifred Harris New Plymouth, New Zealand
- Education: Wellington Girls' College
- Alma mater: Victoria University of Wellington
- Occupation: Public servant
- Cricket career

Cricket information
- Batting: Right-handed
- Bowling: Right-arm slow
- Role: Batter

International information
- National side: International XI (1981/82)
- ODI debut (cap 17): 12 January 1982 v New Zealand
- Last ODI: 6 February 1982 v India

Domestic team information
- Years: Team
- 1977/78–1985/86: Wellington

Career statistics
Competition	WODI	WFC	WLA
Matches	12	33	22
Runs scored	85	988	426
Batting average	9.44	20.16	25.05
100s/50s	0/0	0/7	0/3
Top score	27*	64*	71*
Balls bowled	–	–	12
Wickets	–	–	0
Bowling average	–	–	–
5 wickets in innings	–	–	–
10 wickets in match	–	–	–
Best bowling	–	–	–
Catches/stumpings	3/–	15/–	6/–
- Source: CricketArchive, 30 August 2023

Mary Winifred Harris QSO is a former New Zealand cricketer and public servant who served as Clerk of the House of Representatives from 2007 to 2015. She played 33 first-class cricket matches for Wellington between 1977 and 1986, and 12 One Day Internationals for the International XI women's cricket team at the 1982 Women's Cricket World Cup.

== Early life and family ==
Harris was born in New Plymouth. The family moved to Wellington when Harris's father, a school teacher, took a job at the Correspondence School. She was educated at Wellington Girls' College, and went on to study at Victoria University of Wellington, graduating with a Bachelor of Arts degree in music and geography.

== Career ==
After leaving university, Harris was a violinist in the Wellington Regional Orchestra and worked part-time at Prudential Assurance. She began her state-sector career in 1979 when she was appointed to the Department of Statistics as an assistant investigating officer. After promotion to the position of senior survey officer, she was involved in the development and running of the Household Labour Force Survey.

On 22 June 1987, Harris joined the Parliamentary Service (which from 1985 to 1988 had oversight of the Office of the Clerk of the House) as a senior committee secretary, and in 1990 was promoted to the senior management role of clerk-assistant, initially with responsibility for providing services to select committees and, from July 2000, managing reporting services (including Hansard, broadcasting and Māori language interpretation). She was appointed to the office of deputy clerk on 11 February 2002. Harris was appointed Clerk of the House on 10 December 2007, following the resignation of David McGee, becoming the first woman and first non-lawyer in the role. She served as Clerk of the House for seven years and seven months before retiring on 5 July 2015.

== Cricket ==
A right-handed batter and occasional wicket-keeper, Harris played first-class cricket for Wellington from the 1977/78 season until 1985/86. She played 33 matches for Wellington, scoring 988 runs at an average of 20.16, with a highest score of 64 not out. During her first-class career, she took 15 catches. She captained Wellington in a number of matches.

Harris was drafted into the International XI women's cricket team for the 1982 Women's Cricket World Cup, which was played in New Zealand. During the tournament, she played in all of the International XI's 12 matches, achieving a highest score of 27 not out, averaging 9.44 runs with the bat, and taking three catches.

== Honours ==
In the 2014 New Year Honours, Harris was appointed a Companion of the Queen's Service Order, for services to Parliament.
