= Frank Campbell =

Frank Campbell may refer to:

- Frank Campbell (New York politician) (1858–1924), American politician, New York State comptroller
- Frank T. Campbell (1836–1907), American politician, lieutenant governor of Iowa
- Frank Campbell (footballer, born 1907) (1907–1985), Scottish footballer (Southampton FC)
- Frank Campbell (footballer, born 1950), Scottish footballer (Grimsby Town)
- Frank E. Campbell (1872–1934), founder of the Frank E. Campbell Funeral Chapel
- Frank Campbell (bowls), Irish lawn bowls player

== See also ==
- Francis Campbell (disambiguation)
