= Francis Eastwood Campbell =

New Zealand public servant

Major Francis Eastwood Campbell
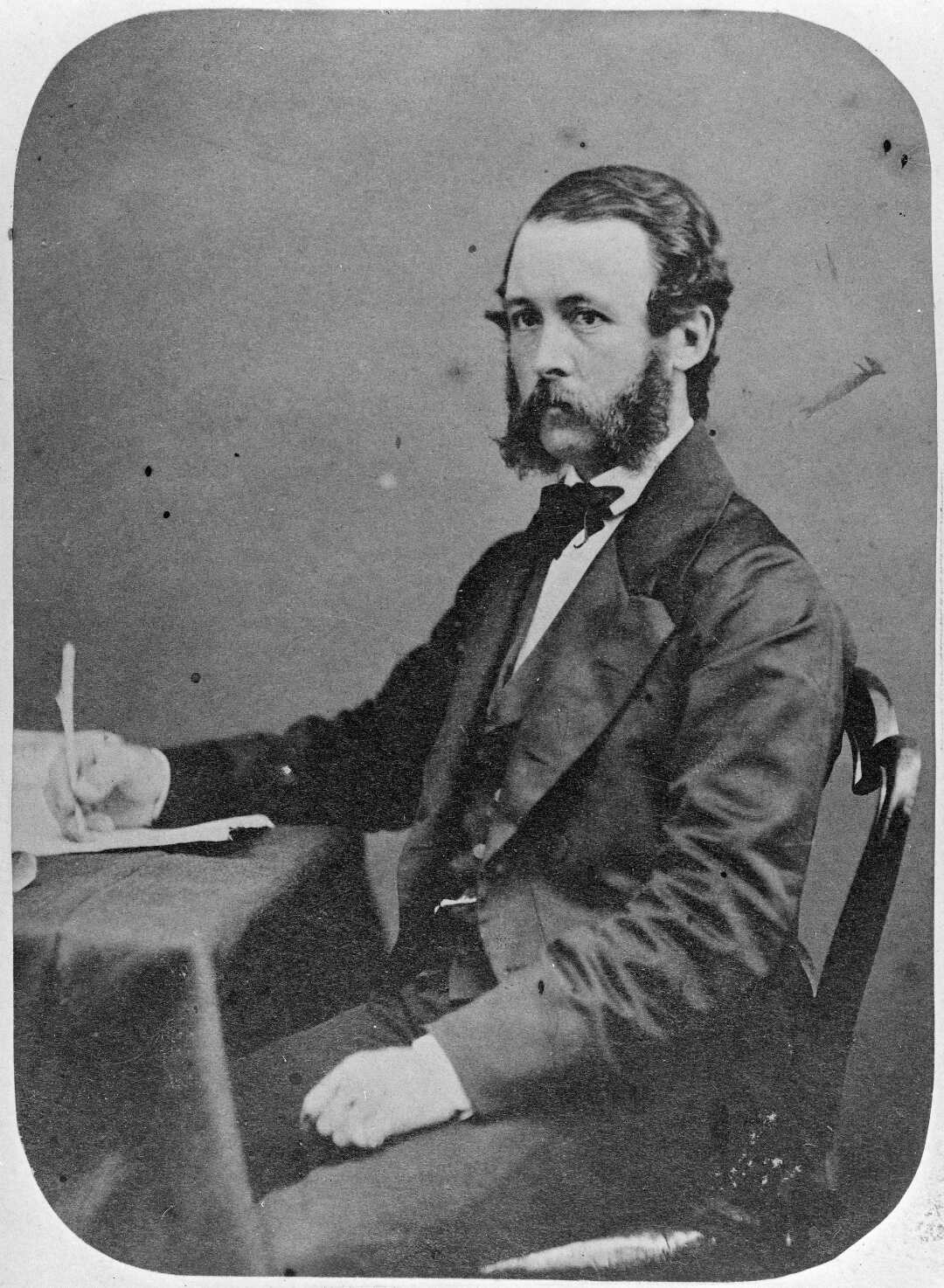
- Campbell in 1860

2nd Clerk of the New Zealand House of Representatives
- In office 10 July 1854 – 30 September 1889
- Preceded by: James Coates
- Succeeded by: George Friend

Chief Clerk, Office of the Auditor General
- In office 24 June 1853 – 9 July 1854
- Preceded by: GME Stephen
- Succeeded by: William Dover

Officer in the NZ Militia
- In office 3 December 1856 – June 1865

Personal details
- Born: 1823
- Died: 27 September 1911 (aged 87) Awahuri, New Zealand
- Resting place: Feilding Cemetery
- Spouse: Elizabeth Susan Downing
- Relations: James Campbell (father)
- Children: Jessie Mary Brisco (nee Campbell)

Major Francis Eastwood Campbell (1823 – 27 September 1911) was the second Clerk of the New Zealand House of Representatives ("Clerk of the House"), serving for 35 years from 1854. An unusual aspect of Campbell's tenure as Clerk of the House was that for the last 21 years that he held this office he also served as the Clerk of Parliaments, an office traditionally reserved for the clerk of the upper house in a Westminster parliamentary system.

He was the son of Lieutenant Colonel James Campbell, Commissioner of Crown Lands in Canterbury from 1851 to 1853.

== Family and arrival in New Zealand ==
Campbell and his father James Campbell were members of the Society of Canterbury Colonists that was formed in London on 25 April 1850 "for the purpose of making suggestions and expressing the opinions of the Colonists upon matters relating to the welfare of the proposed Colony" in Canterbury New Zealand.

Campbell arrived in Auckland from London on the ship Victory on or about 1 February 1851. He was accompanied on the voyage by his parents (Lieutenant Colonel James and Lady Campbell), his sister (Blanche Emily, who later married AG Anderson and whose daughter was Dame Adelaide Mary Anderson) and a servant.

On 26 July 1860 Campbell married Elizabeth ("Eliza") Susan Downing, daughter of Irwin Downing, in Auckland. Elizabeth died on 13 February 1908 and is buried at Feilding Cemetery.

In 1885 the Campbells' only surviving child, daughter Jessie Mary, married Arthur Hylton Brisco, son of Sir Robert Brisco the 3rd Brisco Baronet of Crofton Place. Campbell's oldest grandson Sir Hylton Musgrave Campbell Brisco became the 7th Brisco Baronet. Arthur Hylton Brisco died, aged 79, on 27 January 1927 and Jessie Mary died on 24 October 1932.

== Military career ==
Campbell joined the British army in 1842, at 19 years of age, and attained the rank of 2nd Lieutenant on 16 April 1842; Lieutenant on 29 March 1844; and captain (without purchasing a commission) on 24 July 1849. He is known to have served with the Royal Welch Fusiliers (23rd Regiment of Foot) in Montreal in 1850. At 26 years old he was reported to be the youngest captain to hold that rank in the Royal Welch Fusiliers. He sold his commission and retired from the British army at the age of 28 to come to New Zealand in 1851.

Campbell was commissioned by Governor Thomas Gore Browne as a captain in the Auckland Battalion of the New Zealand Militia with effect from 3 December 1856.

Campbell's commission as a captain and adjutant with the No. 1 Company of the 1st Battalion of the Auckland Regiment of the New Zealand Militia was promulgated with effect from 26 April 1860. As battalion adjutant Campbell regularly issued instructions to militiamen via newspaper advertisements in the Daily Southern Cross and New Zealander. As adjutant he also prosecuted, under the Militia Act 1858, militiamen who were absent without leave from drill or service.

Campbell resigned from 1st Battalion of the Auckland Regiment in early 1862 and was appointed captain with the newly formed Royal Company of Auckland Rifle Volunteers with effect from 1 March 1862.

Campbell resigned from the Auckland Rifle Volunteers in late 1862 (possibly due to the birth in August 1862 of his first child, a son, who did not survive) and was reappointed, with the Rank of Major, with effect from 23 June 1863. With two Lieutenant Colonels Theodore Haultain and HM Nation, Major Campbell was appointed as the third member of the Board of Exemption established to hear applications from men seeking exemption from militia service.

Campbell continued to be the senior officer of the Auckland Rifle Volunteers until he resigned on 27 May 1865 to move to Wellington when Parliament relocated from Auckland. In announcing Campbell's resignation the New Zealand Herald wrote: "During the late war in this province the Auckland Rifle Volunteers did their share and more than their share of the duty which made every man at that time a soldier. To the exertions of the major commanding was due in great measure the efficiency of the corps which distinguished itself on more than one occasion".

In a 1908 letter to the Manawatu Standard, Campbell wrote an account of a battle that took place near Tuakau in September 1863, while he was commander of the Auckland Rifle Volunteers.

== Civilian and Parliamentary career ==
On 29 December 1851 Campbell applied for a sheep and cattle run on Crown land on the Wai-au Ua Plains in Canterbury.

However it appears unlikely that Campbell actually farmed in Canterbury because on 24 June 1853 he was appointed Chief Clerk of the Office of the Auditor General in Auckland.

The Administrator of the Government Robert Wynyard appointed Campbell as Clerk of the House on 10 July 1854, following the untimely death of James Coates five weeks after the House's first sitting.

In 1856 the Wellington Independent newspaper, in a series of articles about the General Assembly, described Campbell and his work as Clerk of the House: "The Clerk in suit of solemn black and scarlet stockings, sits immediately under the Speaker's chair, at the head of the long table which runs through the center of the House for a third of its length. Charged with the whole of the documentary business of the House, he revels in red tape and pigeon holes, and ought to have (we have no doubt: Mr Campbell has) the organs of order and memory enormously developed. His business in the House consists in taking accurate minutes of the proceedings, recording divisions, reading documents, etc. But independently of this he has his hands full of office work connected with reports of committees, summoning committee men, printing orders of the day, and so forth. Nor do his labours cease with the session. The preparation of the blue books [containing the proceedings of the House], the publication of the Acts, and other multifarious business is his; and very well he earns his salary before he gets it. During the session he has an Assistant Clerk [Alexander S. Martin, of whom Campbell complained to the Colonial Secretary about his "continued non-attendance... caused by his having abandoned himself to habits of intemperance"] and several Committee Clerks to help him."

In 1858 Campbell was appointed as Librarian to the General assembly, a role he held until 1865 (when Parliament relocated to Wellington) while also carrying out his roles as an officer in the New Zealand Militia and Clerk of the House. As the first head of the Parliamentary Library Campbell was responsible for establishing the library's collection and, in March 1865, overseeing the transfer of its 80 cases of books to Wellington by the SS Queen.

In 1858 Campbell was designated as the Clerk of the General Assembly and on 22 December 1868, on the recommendation of Premier Edward Stafford, he was designated as the Clerk of Parliaments. The title of Clerk of Parliaments is traditionally conferred on the clerk of the upper house in a Westminster parliamentary system but Stafford advised the Governor to appoint Campbell to this office as he was far more experienced than the clerk of the Legislative Council. The Legislative Council refused to recognise Campbell as anything more than acting in the role of the Clerk of Parliaments, stating that he was not correctly appointed (the Council was not consulted and the appointment was not Gazetted) and that his duties were never defined. A compromise resolution to this impasse was eventually reached with the passing of The Clerk of Parliaments Act, 1872, which provided that Campbell would continue to be the Clerk of Parliaments for as long as he held the office of Clerk of the House of Representatives; after which subsequent appointments would be made "in accordance with the law and usage of the Imperial Parliament". Accordingly, Leonard Stowe, who was appointed Clerk of the Legislative Council in 1865, was appointed as the Clerk of Parliaments when Campbell retired in 1889.

In 1862, as Clerk of the House, Campbell was called as a witness in the Supreme Court case Busby vs Bell, in which former British Resident James Busby sued for libel Francis Dillon Bell (as Land Claims Commissioner). This case addressed the important issue of whether the Clerk of the House was required to produce in court potentially libelous documents that had been tabled in Parliament. With the Speaker's (Sir David Monro) concurrence, Campbell expressed the opinion that to do so without an order from the House would be likely to be a breach of Parliamentary Privilege. Chief Justice Arney disagreed and required Campbell to produce the documents.

An unusual event took place in September 1862 while Campbell was Clerk of the House: Speaker Sir David Monro asked a messenger to stop the House clock at half past five (i.e. move it back by about 7 minutes to the time he was required by Standing Orders to vacate the Chair) to allow further discussion around the passing of the Native Lands bill before the House rose. The Speaker subsequently apologised to the House for this irregular action.

Another role that Campbell fulfilled while holding the office of Clerk of the House was that of Presiding Officer to receive nominations and count votes for the first Board of Directors of The New Zealand Government Life Insurance Association when it was established on 1 January 1885.

After serving as Clerk of the House for 35 years, Campbell retired on 30 September 1889, at 66 years of age. He had served under five different Speakers: Sir Charles Clifford, Sir David Monro, Sir Francis Dillon Bell, Sir William Fitzherbert and Sir George Maurice O'Rorke.

In announcing Campbell's resignation the evening post wrote: "Members have always found in him a competent and sincere advisor. His knowledge of Parliamentary law and practice, growing riper year by year, has proved of immense use to successive Speakers, Ministers, and members. We have never heard a whisper of political bias or personal feeling made against him. He has kept the House thoroughly in the strict groove of Parliamentary usage, and in the British Empire there are now probably few better read or higher authorities on Parliamentary procedure than Major Campbell. Ever calm, courteous and considerate in the discharge of his official duties, all who have been brought in contact with him officially will regret his resignation. We are not aware that during his long career a single official error has been laid to his charge."

Campbell's letter of resignation was read in the House by the Speaker Sir George Maurice O'Rorke, who noted that on becoming Clerk of the House Campbell had hardly any precedents to guide him, but by his "painstaking, accurate and methodical character [he] managed to bring the system of recording our proceedings and printing our statutes to very great perfection". Premier Sir Harry Albert Atkinson, previous Premier Sir John Hall and future Premier John Ballance expressed similar sentiments and the House agreed a motion expressing appreciation to Campbell for "the advice and assistance he was at all times willing to render to members in the conduct of their business".

== Other interests ==
Campbell was installed as Worshipful Master of the Waitemata Masonic Lodge on 26 April 1858.

Campbell and George Friend (third Clerk of the House) were members of the management committee of the Auckland Club, one of the first gentlemen's clubs established in New Zealand.

In October 1862 Campbell was appointed a Justice of the Peace for the Colony of New Zealand. He held this office for almost 38 years, resigning in July 1900.

Campbell was a keen hunter and fisherman and in April 1873, more than a decade after the introduction of red deer into New Zealand, he is reputed to have shot the first stag in the wild.

On 17 April 1903 Campbell was elected as a founding member of the Manawatū branch of the New Zealand Veterans' Association.

== Death ==
Campbell died at his daughter Jessie's home (where he resided in his later years) in Awahuri at the age of 87 on 27 September 1911 and is buried at Feilding Cemetery.

Obituaries about Campbell were published in numerous newspapers.

Members paid tribute to Campbell when his death was announced in the House on 27 September 1911, Prime Minister Sir Joseph George Ward stating: "He was a man who won the respect of everybody who had anything to do with the work of the House". The House agreed a motion "to record its high sense of the faithful services rendered by the late Major Francis Eastwood Campbell as Clerk of the House of Representatives and Clerk of Parliaments for 35 years".
