= Rawden Temple =

British barrister

Sir Rawden John Afamado Temple, CBE, QC (24 May 1908 – 31 May 2000) was a British barrister. A leading advocate, he was Chief National Insurance Commissioner from 1975 to 1981.

Temple was born Nessim Sabatai Afoumado in 1908, the son of Elie Raphael Afoumado, a Sephardic Jew from Constantinople who had settled in England and married a woman from Yorkshire. He grew up in Birmingham, attending King Edward's School there, before going up to The Queen's College, Oxford (BA, BCL). After being called to the bar by the Inner Temple in 1931, he joined Geoffrey Tyndale's chambers and was advised to change his name, adopting the more English-sounding Rawden Temple (formally in 1939). His growing practice was interrupted by service in the Second World War, as an officer in the Royal Artillery and the War Office.

After the war, he enjoyed further success at the divorce bar, practicing in the Probate, Divorce and Admiralty Division. He took silk in 1951 and was appointed Vice-Chairman of the General Council of the Bar in 1960, serving until 1964 (the same year he was appointed CBE). He had hoped to be appointed a High Court Judge, but never was: in his memoirs, Sir Robin Dunn relates a contemporary view that Temple's failure to be promoted was due to a falling out with Sir Jack Simon, the President of the Probate, Divorce and Admiralty Division. Instead, Temple was appointed a National Insurance Commissioner in 1969 and then Chief National Insurance Commissioner in 1975; he retired in 1981, having been knighted in the previous year's Birthday Honours. He was Treasurer of the Inner Temple in 1983, having been a Bencher since 1960.

He enjoyed a long retirement before dying in 2000; his wife, Margaret Jessie Wiseman, daughter of Sir James Gunson, CMG, CBE had predeceased him in 1980. He was survived by two sons, both QCs.
