= James Coates (parliamentary official) =

New Zealand settler and official

1st Clerk of the New Zealand House of Representatives
- In office 24 May 1854 – 30 June 1854
- Preceded by: new office
- Succeeded by: Francis Eastwood Campbell

Clerk of the Auckland Provincial Council
- In office 18 October 1853 – 23 May 1854
- Preceded by: new office
- Succeeded by: Alex S. Martin

Clerk of Councils
- In office 3 May 1841 – 1853
- Preceded by: new office
- Succeeded by: James Hay Wodehouse (Ex. Council) James Piercy (Leg. Council)

Personal details
- Born: 1815
- Died: 1 July 1854 (aged 39) Eden Crescent, Auckland CBD
- Spouse: Sarah Anne Bendall
- Children: William, Lavinia, Georgiana, Augustus, James

James Coates (1815 – 1 July 1854) was a prominent pioneer settler of Auckland, New Zealand. He was also a senior official within the administration of the newly-established colony of New Zealand, following the proclamation of sovereignty by William Hobson (on behalf of the British Crown) and the signing of the Treaty of Waitangi in 1840.

Coates served in various roles, including as sheriff of the colony, magistrate, chief clerk in the Office of the Colonial Secretary, first clerk of the clerk of the executive and legislative councils, first clerk of the Auckland Provincial Council and, for five weeks prior to his death, as the first Clerk of the New Zealand House of Representatives.

== From Jamaica to New Zealand, marriage and settling in Auckland ==
Coates was born in Montego Bay Jamaica in 1815, the second son of John and Mary Coates, plantation owners. He is described as being "liberal minded", with a "tall, slim, gentlemanly demeanor, and no want of office ability". Coates practiced law in Jamaica and worked within the government of the British West Indies before leaving to settle in New Zealand.

On 2 March 1840 Coates arrived in Australia, having sailed from Bristol on the ship Chelydra. The Colonist newspaper reported rumours that Coates was related to Governor Sir George Gipps, and that Gipps had appointed Coates as the Colonial Secretary for New Zealand. Coates denied both rumours, stating that he had not had the honour of meeting the governor until after his (Coates') arrival in Australia.

At 25 years of age, in July 1840, Coates arrived in New Zealand on the ship Chelydra. Also arriving from England via Sydney on the Chelydra that day was Sarah Anne Bendall (1819–1892) who subsequently became Mrs Coates in the second recorded wedding in Auckland. The wedding took place in the drawing room at Government House on 24 June 1841, with the bride being given away by William Hobson, the Governor of New Zealand. After the wedding one of Hobson's five children was christened, with the newly married couple serving as godparents. These ceremonies were then followed by Auckland's first ball.

Coates was a signatory (as witness) to both the original Waitangi Sheet of the Treaty of Waitangi (on 5 August 1840) and the deed recording the purchase from Maori in 1840, by George Clarke on behalf of the British Crown, of the 3000 acres on which central Auckland now stands. On 19 April 1841, in the first public land auction in what was to become Auckland City, Coates purchased two of the initial 119 sections put up for sale. Then in the first sale of suburban and country land on 1 September 1841, he purchased a small farm (12 acres) in partnership with captain William Cornwallis Symonds.

== Career ==
Coates' career in New Zealand began on 12 July 1840 when he was appointed as a clerk (third class) in the office of the colonial secretary, reporting to the Colonial Secretary Willoughby Shortland through the Chief Clerk James Stuart Freeman. On 16 November 1840 Lieutenant-Governor William Hobson appointed Coates as his private secretary, a role which had previously been performed by Freeman as chief clerk.

On 3 May 1841 Coates relinquished his role as private secretary when Hobson (now governor, rather than lieutenant-governor, as Queen Victoria had by this time decreed New Zealand to be a separate colony from New South Wales, and had appointed Hobson as governor) appointed Coates as the first clerk of the executive and legislative councils. Hobson also appointed Coates as one of a small number of "Magistrates of the Territory of New Zealand" (Justice of the Peace) On 1 July 1841 Coates was appointed by Hobson to be the "Sheriff of the Colony of New Zealand and its Dependencies". From 10 January 1842 until his resignation effective on 23 September 1843, Coates was sheriff of the Central District of New Ulster (Auckland district). On 7 March 1842, as Sheriff of Auckland, Coates was required to oversee the first capital punishment in New Zealand. He held the roles of magistrate and sheriff at the same time as the position of clerk of councils.

When Robert FitzRoy took office as governor in late 1843 he appointed (with effect from 15 January 1844) Coates, together with the newly appointed Colonial Secretary, Andrew Sinclair, and Registrar of Deeds, Robert Appleyard Fitzgerald, as "Commissioners, pro tempore, to examine the public accounts of the colony". Coates performed this role for about a year, without additional pay, while continuing to hold the position of clerk of councils.

Governor George Grey appointed Coates as chief clerk in the office of the colonial secretary on 1 March 1846. After this appointment Coates relinquished his position as clerk of councils for a period, but was reappointed to it again on 1 October 1848, while still retaining the position of chief clerk. He continued to hold the positions of Chief Clerk and Clerk of councils until 1853, occasionally acting as colonial secretary when Andrew Sinclair was absent. When the Auckland Provincial Council met for the first time in October 1853, Coates became its first clerk.

== First Clerk of the House of Representatives ==
Coates was the acting Clerk of the House of Representatives when it assembled for the first time on 24 May 1854. His permanent appointment was proposed by Samuel Revans, who said that "No man could be found in the country so well qualified for it as Mr Coates". After some debate about whether it was appropriate for the House to appoint its Clerk and Sergeant-at-Arms, it was decided that the Administrator of the Government (Robert Wynyard, who was head of the Executive branch of government from January 1854 to September 1855, following the end of George Grey's first term as governor and prior to the arrival of Governor Thomas Gore Browne) should be asked to make appointments to these positions. The Speaker Charles Clifford subsequently recommended the appointment of Coates for the position of Clerk of the House, stating "I have the honour to recommend Mr Coates for the office of Clerk, that Gentleman having already proved his great efficiency".

Although Coats was only Clerk of the House of Representatives for five weeks, and died before his appointment was published in the Government Gazette, he oversaw the development of the House's first Standing Orders, which were adopted by the House on 9 June 1854.

Following Coates' death the House resolved that "200 pounds be appropriated as a donation to the widow and children of Mr James Coates, Clerk of the House of Representatives" (this was a significant donation, being almost a year's salary).

== Children ==
Coates' firstborn William Hobson Coates, born in 1842, was the first child to be entered into the baptism register at Auckland's first church St Paul's. Governor Hobson and Lady Hobson were his godparents. WH Coates was an ensign in the Auckland Militia and the 1st Regiment of Waikato Militia. He died on 16 March 1879, aged 36, and is buried in St Stephens Cemetery Auckland.

Coates' second child Lavinia Coates, born 1844, was president of the Victoria League and was made an Officer of the Order of the British Empire in recognition of her services in connection with the First World War. For several years she acted as chaperone and companion to Minnie Horton, daughter of The New Zealand Herald proprietor Alfred George Horton. She toured England and the Continent with the Hortons during the 1890s. For a brief period in 1896 she served as aide to Sir George Grey. Lavinia never married. She died in 1929 and is buried at Purewa Cemetery, Auckland.

Coates' third child Georgiana Sophia, born 1846, married Canon Charles Moseley Nelson, who was the Vicar of St Paul's Church, Auckland for 38 years. The National Library of New Zealand holds a sketch by Charles Heaphy which depicts Rev Nelson proposing to Georgiana ("Sophy") at the Freemason's picnic. Georgiana was president of the Ladies' Benevolent Society for 30 years, one of the founders of the SPCA, the Parnell Orphans' Home, and the Plunket Society. She was also a vice-president of the Girls' Friendly Society and an active member of the Mothers' Union. She died on 9 October 1919 and is buried in St Stephens Cemetery Auckland.

Coates' fourth child Augustus "Gus" John Ligar Coates, born 11 November 1849, married Jane Maunsell, daughter of the Venerable Robert Maunsell who was one of New Zealand's first missionaries and was instrumental in framing the Treaty of Waitangi and encouraging Maori chiefs to sign it. AJL Coates was one of the first commercial travellers in New Zealand. He died on 25 October 1926. AJL Coates' Great-great-grandson Barry Coates became a New Zealand Member of Parliament in 2016.

Coates' fifth child Sir James Hugh Buchanan Coates, born in 1851, was not quite three years old at the time of his father's death. He remained unmarried, and became a prominent banker. He died on 11 October 1935.

== Death ==
Coates died at the age of 39 on 1 July 1854. The death occurred at his residence in Eden Crescent in the Auckland CBD, and the death certificate states "Disease of Heart" as being the cause of death. He is buried in Symonds Street Cemetery Auckland.
