= James Coates (banker) =

New Zealand sportsman and banker

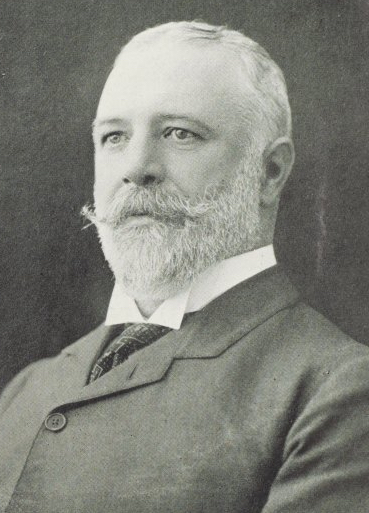
Sir James Coates

Sir James Hugh Buchanan Coates (9 October 1851 – 11 October 1935) was a New Zealand banker and keen sportsman. He was the general manager of the National Bank of New Zealand for 21 years before retiring from that role in 1914, moving to London and becoming a company director.

== Early life and sporting interests ==
Coates was born in George's Bay, Auckland, New Zealand, on 9 October 1851. His father, James Coates, was a prominent pioneer settler of Auckland and a senior official within the administration of the newly established colony.

Coates was educated at the Church of England Grammar School and St John's College, Auckland. With an athletic build, from a young age he was a keen cricketer, played rugby football, rowed and was an excellent shot-putter. Later he played golf, enjoyed horse-racing and was one of the founders of the Auckland Cricket Association and the Auckland Amateur Athletic and Cycle Club.

== Banking career ==
In 1869, he was employed by the Bank of New South Wales, for which he worked in both Auckland and Thames, before becoming a teller with the National Bank of New Zealand in Auckland in 1873. He became an accountant in 1875 and manager in 1886, before being appointed general manager of the bank in 1893. After retiring as general manager in 1914 he became a director of the bank at its head office in London. He was also a director of the South British Insurance Company (from 1922 until his death), the Guardian Trust and Executors Company, and he was a valued financial adviser to the Government of New Zealand.

== Honours and awards ==
Coates was appointed a Knight Bachelor in the 1922 New Year Honours. In 1935, he was awarded the King George V Silver Jubilee Medal.

== Death ==
Coates never married. He died at 84 years of age at his home in St Stephen's Avenue, Parnell, Auckland, on 11 October 1935, after developing bronchial pneumonia. He was buried at Purewa Cemetery in the Auckland suburb of Meadowbank.

At the annual meeting of the South British Insurance Company on 24 October 1935 the chairman of directors, Victor Larner, said of Coates:

Few men in New Zealand were more widely known or more highly esteemed. To Sir James it made no difference whether he was dealing with the highest or the humblest in the land; his geniality and courtesy were unvarying. It was this innate kindliness that won for him such a high place in the regard of the community. By his death the board has lost a valued member and the directors personally an old and trusted friend.
