= David McGee =

British-born New Zealand lawyer and public servant (1947–2023)

David McGee CNZM KC
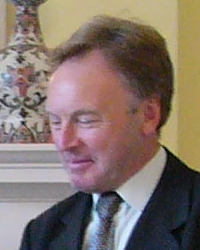
- McGee in 2007

New Zealand Ombudsman
- In office 19 November 2007 – 31 May 2013
- Succeeded by: Ron Paterson

12th Clerk of the House of Representatives
- In office 1985–2007
- Preceded by: Charles Philip Littlejohn
- Succeeded by: Mary Harris

Personal details
- Born: David Graham McGee; 11 December 1947 North Shields, Northumberland, England
- Died: 27 August 2023 (aged 75) Wellington, New Zealand
- Education: BA(Hons) (1970); Lanchester College of Technology, LLD (2009); Victoria University of Wellington

David Graham McGee CNZM KC (11 December 1947 – 27 August 2023) was a New Zealand lawyer and long-standing New Zealand public servant of 40 years who served as Clerk of the New Zealand House of Representatives from 1985 to 2007 and an Ombudsman in New Zealand from 2007 until 31 May 2013.

== Early life ==
Born in North Shields, Northumberland, England, on 11 December 1947, McGee was born into poverty in the United Kingdom in North Shields, Tynemouth, Northumberland, some 15 km to the east of the city of Newcastle, where he was brought up by his mother. They lived in a very small and run-down upstairs flat just off Saville Street. He went to Western School to the age of 11, when he was one of the first pupils from the school to pass the highly selective 11-plus examination. This took him to Tynemouth High (Grammar) School, where he did not excel academically, but was a popular pupil. He played half back for the school football team. He left school at age 16 with few formal qualifications and worked in a solicitors office and played football. McGee trialed for a number of professional clubs, including Brighton, but he was deemed to be not good enough to be offered a professional contract. After 3 or 4 years he decided that his office job was a dead-end. McGee then enrolled in night-school classes in Wallsend where he passed several GCSE "O" & "A" levels. This enabled him to take a degree in business law from Coventry University.

In search of a new life, McGee decided to leave the United Kingdom in 1972. He arrived in New Zealand on the SS Brittanis as a Ten Pound Pom in 1972, and became a naturalised New Zealand citizen in 1976.

== Career ==
McGee joined the New Zealand parliament in 1974, and he left it in 2007. From 2007 to 2013, he served as ombudsman.

McGee worked in the Office of the Clerk of the House of Representatives for 34 years and filled several roles, including acting as Clerk of Select Committees. He was Clerk of the House for 22 years, from 1985 to 2007. His book "Parliamentary Practice in New Zealand", first published in 1985 and later updated multiple times, is widely recognized as the "go to" book for all those who want to understand how New Zealand parliament works and it remains required reading for all new New Zealand MPs, to this day.

He was a collaborator on the Constitution Act 1986. His contribution to the understanding and development of the New Zealand parliamentary system is generally recognized as extraordinary.

== Personal life ==
McGee met Daniele Khoodoo on a New Zealand parliamentary trip to Mauritius in 1976, and they married the following year.

== Later life and death ==
McGee retired as ombudsman in May 2013 at the age of 65. He died in Wellington on 27 August 2023, at the age of 75 after a short illness. McGee reshaped parliament in New Zealand with his contributions to New Zealand parliamentary practices.

== Honours and awards ==
In 1977, McGee was awarded the Queen Elizabeth II Silver Jubilee Medal, and in 1990 he received the New Zealand 1990 Commemoration Medal. In the 2002 Queen's Birthday and Golden Jubilee Honours, McGee was appointed a Companion of the New Zealand Order of Merit, for services to Parliament.
