= Adelaide Anderson =

British civil servant and labour activist

Dame Adelaide Anderson DBE
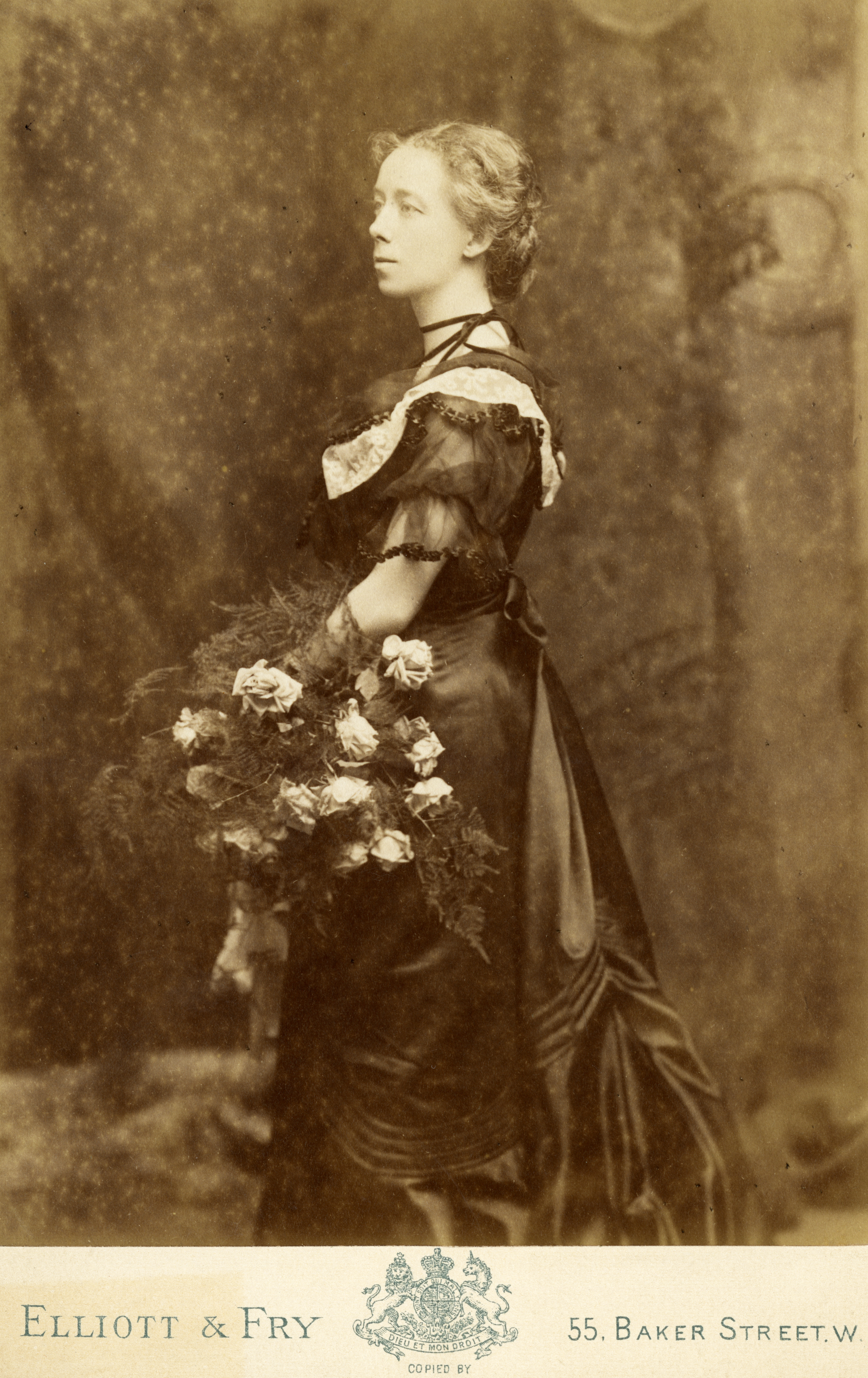

Her Majesty's Principal Lady Inspector of Factories
- In office 1897–1921

Personal details
- Born: 8 April 1863 Melbourne, Australia
- Died: 28 August 1936 (aged 73)
- Education: Girton College, Cambridge
- Occupation: civil servant and labour activist

Dame Adelaide Mary Anderson, DBE (8 April 1863 – 28 August 1936) was a British civil servant and labour activist, particularly interested in child labour and conditions in China. She served as HM Principal Lady Inspector of Factories from 1897 to 1921.

== Early life and education ==
Anderson was born in Melbourne, Australia, to a Scottish family, but was raised in London. Her mother was Blanche Emily Anderson (née Campbell), her uncle was Francis Eastwood Campbell, and her grandfather was James Campbell. Both her uncle and grandfather were public servants in New Zealand. Her father was Alexander Gavin Anderson (died 1892). Her parents were married at St Michael's Church in Christchurch, New Zealand in 1861. She was educated at Queen's College in Harley Street and at Girton College, Cambridge, where she studied for the Moral Sciences Tripos and graduated in 1887.

== Career ==
She was a lecturer for the Women's Co-operative Guild and was offering private tuition when, in 1892, she joined the staff of the Royal Commission on Labour as a clerk. This subsequently led to her appointment in 1894 as one of the first women factory inspectors in the Home Office. She was appointed Her Majesty's Principal Lady Inspector of Factories in 1897, dealing with issues of health and safety, working hours and conditions. On her retirement she was appointed Dame Commander of the Order of the British Empire (DBE), having been appointed Commander of the Order of the British Empire (CBE) in 1918.

== China ==
Adelaide Anderson c.1910

After her retirement from the Home Office, she visited China three times. In 1923–1924 she became a member of the Commission on Child Labour under the auspices of the Municipal Council of the International Settlement of Shanghai. In 1926 she was a member of the Advisory Committee on the China Indemnity of the Foreign Office.

In 1931 she served on a mission for the International Labour Office to Nanking, regarding a factory inspectorate for China. She was also a member of the Universities China Committee in London from 1932 to 1936.

== Other travels ==
In 1930 she also visited Egypt to enquire into conditions of child labour. In addition, she travelled to South Africa, Australia and New Zealand. Anderson wrote and lectured widely until her death in 1936, aged 73.

== Publications ==
- Women in the Factory: An Administrative Adventure, 1893–1921 (1922)
- Humanity and Labour in China: An Industrial Visit and its Sequel, 1923–1926 (1928)

== Archives ==
Anderson's papers are held by the Women's Library at the library of the London School of Economics, ref 7AMA

== Sources ==
- Biography, Oxford Dictionary of National Biography
