= 1922 New Year Honours (New Zealand) =

Annual awards for New Zealanders

The 1922 New Year Honours in New Zealand were appointments by King George V on the advice of the New Zealand government to various orders and honours to reward and highlight good works by New Zealanders. The awards celebrated the passing of 1921 and the beginning of 1922, and were announced on 2 January 1922.

The recipients of honours are displayed here as they were styled before their new honour.

== Knight Bachelor ==
- James Hugh Buchanan Coates – of Wellington; a member of the board of directors of the National Bank of New Zealand.
- John Ross – of Dunedin. Has taken practical interest in educational and philanthropic work.
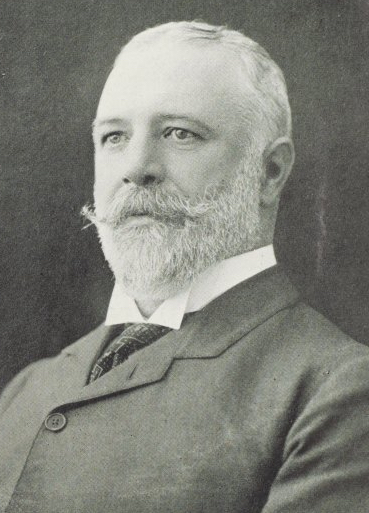
Sir James Coates

== Order of Saint Michael and Saint George ==
=== Companion (CMG) ===
- James Henry Gunson CBE – mayor of the City of Auckland.
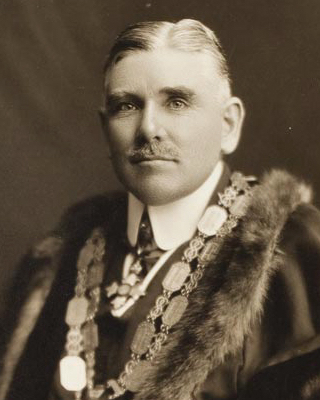
James Gunson
