= Frank Campbell (footballer, born 1950) =

Scottish footballer

Personal information
- Date of birth: 23 December 1950 (age 75)
- Place of birth: Dunkeld, Scotland
- Height: 5 ft 11 in (1.80 m)
- Position: Defender

Senior career*
Years	Team	Apps	(Gls)
1968–1970	Grimsby Town	4	(0)
- * Club domestic league appearances and goals

Frank Campbell (born 23 December 1950) is a Scottish professional footballer who played as a midfielder.
