= Member of parliament =

Representative of the voters to a parliament

A member of parliament (MP) is the representative in parliament of the people who live in their electoral district. Members of parliament typically form parliamentary groups, sometimes called caucuses, with members of the same political party. In many countries with bicameral parliaments, this term refers only to members of the lower house since upper house members often have a different title. The terms member of congress (or congressperson) and deputy are equivalent terms used in other jurisdictions.

== Westminster system ==
The Westminster system is a democratic parliamentary system of government modelled after the politics of the United Kingdom. This term comes from the Palace of Westminster, the seat of the Parliament of the United Kingdom.

=== Australia ===
At the national level, a "member of parliament" is a member of the House of Representatives, the lower house of the Federal Parliament. Members may use the post-nominal "MP" after their names. "MHR" ("Member of the House of Representatives") was not used, which was affirmed by cabinet in 1901 and reaffirmed in 1951 and 1965. However, the prohibition of "MHR" does not appear to have been strictly enforced, as it was used most recently by Tony Abbott when he was in the parliament (1994–2019).

A member of the Senate, the upper house of parliament, is known as a "Senator".

==== States and territories ====
Lower houses members of the Legislative Assemblies of New South Wales, Queensland and Victoria, and the Houses of Assembly in South Australia and Tasmania use the post-nominal "MP". Previously, these states used the post-nominals "MLA" ("Member of the Legislative Assembly") and "MHA" ("Member of the House of Assembly") respectively.

Members of the Legislative Assemblies of Western Australia, Northern Territory, and Australian Capital Territory use the post-nominal "MLA". However, "MP" is also commonly used.

In bicameral legislatures, members of the upper house (legislative council) use "MLC" ("Member of the Legislative Council").

MLCs are informally referred to as upper house MPs.

=== Bahamas ===
The Parliament of the Bahamas is the bicameral national parliament of the Commonwealth of the Bahamas. The parliament is formally made up of the monarch (represented by the governor-general), an appointed Senate, and an elected House of Assembly. It currently sits at Nassau, the national capital.

The structure, functions, and procedures of the parliament are based on the Westminster system.

=== Bangladesh ===
In Bangladesh, a member of parliament is an individual who serves in the unicameral Jatiya Sangsad or House of the Nation. Members of the Jatiya Sangsad are elected at a general election, usually held once every five years unless Parliament is dissolved sooner by the president on the advice of the prime minister. Under the Constitution of Bangladesh, an individual is required to be a citizen of Bangladesh and must have attained the age of 25 years in order to qualify for election to Parliament.

The Parliament consists of 300 directly elected members from general seats elected by use of first past the post who represent single-constituencies, while 50 seats are reserved exclusively for women and are allocated on a proportional basis. After an election, the Election Commission allocates reserved seats to parties based on the number of general seats they won. A party then presents a list of candidates, each requiring a presenter and a seconder. If the number of candidates presented and seats allocated is equal, then there is no election and the reserved seats are filled in accordance with the candidate lists prepared by parties. In the event there are more candidates than seat allocations, the 300 MPs elected from general seats vote through use of the single transferable vote system to determine the reserved seats. In reality, there has never been an election for reserved seats as parties have never nominated more candidates than they have been allocated. In order to form a Government, a political party or alliance usually requires a simple majority in Parliament. Since Bangladesh's independence, the prime minister has concurrently held the position of Leader of the House.

=== Barbados ===
The Parliament of Barbados is the legislative branch of the government of Barbados. It is a bicameral body, composed of an appointed Senate and an elected House of Assembly. The Senate (upper house), the direct successor of a pre-Independence body known as the "Legislative Council"—comprises 21 senators appointed by the president. The President appoints 12 Senators on the advice of the Prime Minister and two on the advice of the Leader of the Opposition. The remaining seven Senators are nominated by the President at their discretion (that is, the President is not bound by other political leaders' advice in these appointments) to represent various religious, social, economic, or other interests in Barbados.

In the absence of an opposition leader in parliament (i.e. in the case of a landslide victory where one party takes all 30 seats in the House of Assembly, as occurred in 2018 and 2022) the president will then appoint the remaining two senators in the opposition's stead allowing for 9 independents instead.

The House of Assembly (lower house) is made up of 30 members of Parliament, elected to five-year terms on a first-past-the-post basis in single-seat constituencies.

=== Canada ===
The Parliament of Canada consists of the monarch, the Senate and the House of Commons. Only members of the House of Commons are referred to as members of Parliament (French: député); members of the Senate are called Senators (French: sénateur). There are currently 105 seats in the Senate and 343 in the House of Commons. Members of Parliament are elected, while senators are appointed by the governor general on behalf of the sovereign at the direction of the prime minister. Retirement is mandatory for senators upon reaching the age of 75 years.

Each province (and territory) has its own legislature, with each member usually known as a Member of the Legislative Assembly (MLA). In certain provinces, legislators carry other titles: Member of Provincial Parliament (MPP) in Ontario, Member of the National Assembly (MNA) in Quebec (French: député) and Member of the House of Assembly (MHA) in Newfoundland and Labrador. The provincial upper houses were eliminated between 1876 (Manitoba) and 1968 (Quebec).

=== Gibraltar ===
In Gibraltar, members of parliament serve in the unicameral Gibraltar Parliament. There are 17 seats in the Parliament, to which candidates are elected by block voting. Each candidate represents the whole of Gibraltar as their constituency.

=== India ===
A member of Parliament is a member of either of the two houses of the Indian Parliament: Lok Sabha (lower house) and Rajya Sabha (upper house). Lok Sabha has 543 seats, all of whom are directly elected by the citizens of India from each parliamentary constituency of states and union territories via first-past-the-post voting. Rajya Sabha can have 245 members, of which 238 members are indirectly elected. Of these 238 members, 229 belong to the state legislatures and 9 belongs to the union territories of Delhi, Puducherry, and Jammu and Kashmir, and are elected by using the single transferable vote method of proportional representation. The remaining 12 members are nominated by the president for their contributions to art, literature, science, and social services. Each state has a fixed number of representatives allocated in each chamber, in order of their respective populations. The state of Uttar Pradesh has the greatest number of representatives in both houses. The person which secures the support of more than half the seats in the Lok Sabha forms the Government. To form the government, parties may form a coalition.

The term of a member of the Rajya Sabha is six years, while Lok Sabha members are elected for a term of five years, unless the house is dissolved sooner. Rajya Sabha is a permanent house that is not subject to dissolution, and one third of the members retire every two years. Vacancies in both houses, whether because of death or resignation of a member, must be filled by using a bypoll within six months of the vacancy; the newly elected member then only serves the remainder of the term of the seat to which they are elected. The number of seats in both houses is regulated by the Constitution and parliamentary statutes.

=== Ireland ===
Since the formation of the Irish Free State in 1922 and subsequently in the Republic of Ireland, the legislature of Ireland is known as the Oireachtas, and consists of the president; the upper house, Seanad Éireann (or Senate); and lower house, Dáil Éireann (Assembly, or House of Representatives). They are functionally similar to other bicameral parliaments, with the lower house being significantly more influential and having more power over the creation of legislation. Elections to Dáil Éireann are held at least every five years using the single transferable vote; while elections to Seanad Éireann are restricted to members of both houses, elected members of local authorities, and alumni of National University of Ireland colleges. Eleven senators are nominated directly by the Taoiseach.

A Member of Dáil Éireann is known as a Teachta Dála (TD) or "Deputy to the Dáil", and addressed as "Teachta" (Deputy), while a Member of the Seanad is known and addressed as Seanadóir (Senator). These titles are used much more commonly in English than the official Irish.

A member of Parliament was the term used to refer to a member of the pre-1801 Irish House of Commons of the Parliament of Ireland. Irish members elected to the House of Commons of the United Kingdom of Great Britain and Ireland were also called members of Parliament from 1801 to 1922. Northern Ireland continues to elect MPs to the Parliament of the United Kingdom.

=== Jamaica ===
The Parliament of Jamaica is the legislative branch of the government of Jamaica. It is a bicameral body, composed of an appointed Senate and an elected House of Representatives. The Senate (upper house), the direct successor of a pre-Independence body known as the "Legislative Council"—comprises 21 senators appointed by the governor-general: thirteen on the advice of the prime minister and eight on the advice of the leader of the opposition.

The House of Representatives, the lower house, is made up of 63 (previously 60) members of Parliament, elected to five-year terms on a first-past-the-post basis in single-seat constituencies.

=== Kenya ===
The National Assembly of Kenya has a total of 349 seats; 205 members are elected from the constituencies, 47 women are elected from the counties and 12 members are nominated representatives. Kenya also has 47 elected senators from 47 counties; who sit in the Senate parliament. The senators oversee the counties, which are run by governors- also democratically elected. There are also members of county assembly. They are elected from each ward, and seat in county assemblies to oversee and make laws for their respective counties.

=== Malaysia ===
The Parliament of Malaysia consists of the Yang di-Pertuan Agong (King) and two houses, the Dewan Rakyat (the House of Representatives) and Dewan Negara (the Senate).

The term "members of Parliament" only refers to members of the Dewan Rakyat. In Malay, a member of Parliament is called Ahli Parlimen, or less formally wakil rakyat (people's representative).

Members of Parliament are elected from population-based single-seat constituencies using first-past-the-post voting. The prime minister must be a member of Parliament.

Members of Parliament are styled Yang Berhormat ("Honourable") with the initials Y.B. appended prenominally. A prince who is a member of Parliament is styled Yang Berhormat Mulia. The prime minister, deputy prime minister and Tuns who are members of Parliament are styled Yang Amat Berhormat ("Most Honourable"), abbreviated Y.A.B.

=== Malta ===
The Parliament of Malta consists of the president of Malta and the House of Representatives of 69 members (article 51 of the Constitution), referred to as "members of Parliament" (article 52(1) of the Constitution). When appointed from outside the House, the speaker is also considered a member of the Parliament. The Constitution lists the qualifications and disqualifications from serving as a member of Parliament.

Privileges of members of Parliament and their Code of Ethics are laid out in the House of Representatives (Privileges and Powers) Ordinance.

=== Nauru ===
The Parliament of Nauru consists of 18 seats. Members of Parliament are entitled to use the prefix The Honourable.

=== New Zealand ===
The New Zealand Parliament is a unicameral legislature made up of the monarch and the House of Representatives. A "member of Parliament" is a member of the House of Representatives, which has a minimum of 120 members, elected at a general election for a three-year term. There are 72 electorate MPs, of which seven are elected only by Māori who have chosen to be registered on a separate Māori electoral roll. The remaining members are elected by proportional representation from published party lists.

Since 1907, members of the House of Representatives have been referred to as "Member of Parliament", abbreviated MP. From the 1860s until 1907 they were designated as "Member of the House of Representatives", abbreviated MHR. Between the first general election, in 1853, and the 1860s, the designation was "Member of the General Assembly", abbreviated MGA. Before 1951, New Zealand had an upper house, the Legislative Council, whose members were appointed.

=== Pakistan ===
A member of Parliament is a member of either of the two houses of the Pakistani Parliament: the National Assembly of Pakistan and Senate of Pakistan. The National Assembly of Pakistan has a total of 342 members, of whom 272 are directly elected, and 70 seats are reserved for women and minorities. A member of the National Assembly of Pakistan (MNA) has a tenure of five years. On the other hand, there are 96 members of the Senate of Pakistan, in which all four provinces are represented by 23 senators regardless of population, while the Islamabad Capital Territory is represented by four senators. A member of the Senate of Pakistan (a senator) has a tenure of six years.

=== Singapore ===
Member of Parliament refers to elected members of the Parliament of Singapore, the appointed Non-constituency Member of Parliament from the opposition, as well as the Nominated Members of Parliament, who may be appointed from members of the public who have no connection to any political party in Singapore.

=== Sri Lanka ===
In Sri Lanka, a Member of Parliament refers to a member of the Parliament of Sri Lanka (since 1978), the National State Assembly (1972–78) and the House of Representatives of Ceylon (1947–72), the lower house of the Parliament of Ceylon. Members are elected in a general elections or appointed from the national lists allocated to parties (and independent groups) in proportion to their share of the national vote at a general election. A candidate to become an MP must be a Sri Lankan citizen and can be a holder of dual-citizenship in any other country, be at least 18 years of age, and not be a public official or officeholder.

=== Trinidad and Tobago ===
The Parliament of Trinidad and Tobago is the legislative branch of the government of Trinidad and Tobago. The Parliament is bicameral. It consists of the elected House of Representatives, which has 41 members elected for a five-year term in single-seat constituencies, and the Senate which has 31 members appointed by the president: 16 government senators appointed on the advice of the prime minister, 6 opposition senators appointed on the advice of the leader of the opposition and 9 independent senators appointed by the president to represent other sectors of civil society.

=== United Kingdom ===
The United Kingdom elects members of its parliament:

- the Parliament of the United Kingdom, with 650 members elected by the first-past-the-post system to the (lower) House of Commons, referred to as members of Parliament, abbreviated to MP

and four devolved legislatures:

- the Scottish Parliament, with 129 members elected under the additional member system every five years, and each called Member of the Scottish Parliament (MSP; Scottish Gaelic: Ball Pàrlamaid na h-Alba, BPA; Scots: Memmer o the Scots Pairliament, MSP)
- the Northern Ireland Assembly, with 90 members each known as Member of the Legislative Assembly (MLA; Irish: Comhalta den Tionól Reachtach, CTR; Ulster-Scots: Laa-Makkan Forgaitherar, LMF). (Between 1921 and 1973, Northern Ireland was governed by the bicameral Parliament of Northern Ireland. Members of its lower house, the House of Commons of Northern Ireland, were known as Member of Parliament.)
- the Senedd (Welsh Parliament), with 60 elected members called Member of the Senedd (English - MS); Welsh: Aelod o'r Senedd, AS)
- the London Assembly, with 25 members elected under the additional member system every four years, called Members of the London Assembly (AM)

MPs are elected in general elections and by-elections to represent constituencies, and may remain MPs until Parliament is dissolved. "If it has not been dissolved earlier, a Parliament dissolves at the beginning of the day that is the fifth anniversary of the day on which it first met." (Dissolution and Calling of Parliament Act 2022).

A candidate to become an MP must be a British or Irish or Commonwealth citizen, be at least 18 years of age (reduced from 21 in 2006), and not be a public official or officeholder, as set out in the schedule to the Electoral Administration Act 2006.

Technically, MPs have no right to resign their seats (though they may refuse to seek re-election). However a legal fiction allows voluntary resignation between elections; as MPs are forbidden from holding an "office of profit under the Crown", an MP wishing to resign will apply for the Stewardship of the Chiltern Hundreds or the Stewardship of the Manor of Northstead which are nominally such paid offices and thus result in the MP vacating their seat. (Accepting a salaried ministerial office does not amount to a paid office under the Crown for these purposes.)

The House of Lords is a legislative chamber that is part of the Parliament of the United Kingdom. Although they are part of the parliament, its members are referred to as peers, more formally as Lords of Parliament, not MPs. Lords Temporal sit for life, Lords Spiritual while they occupy their ecclesiastical positions. Hereditary peers may no longer pass on a seat in the House of Lords to their heir automatically. The 92 who remain have been elected from among their own number, following the House of Lords Act 1999 and are the only elected members of the Lords.

=== Zimbabwe ===
Members of the National Assembly, the lower house of Parliament, are styled "members of Parliament", while members of the Senate, the upper house, are referred to as "senators".

== Other systems ==
Member of Parliament can be the term (often a translation) for representatives in parliamentary democracies that do not follow the Westminster system and who are usually referred to in a different fashion, such as deputé in France, deputato in Italy, deputat in Bulgaria, parlamentario or diputado in Spain and Spanish-speaking Latin America, deputado in Portugal and Brazil, and Mitglied des Bundestages (MdB) in Germany. However, better translations are often possible.

=== Afghanistan ===
Prior to the takeover of the Islamic Emirate of Afghanistan in August 2021, a member of parliament (MP) was a member of the lower house of the bicameral National Assembly of Afghanistan: a member of the Wolesi Jirga (House of People) held one of the in total 250 seats in the lower house. The 102 members of the upper house Meshrano Jirga (House of Elders) were called Senators.

=== Austria ===
A member of Parliament is a member of either of the two chambers of the Parliament of Austria (Österreichisches Parlament). The members of the Nationalrat are called Abgeordnete zum Nationalrat. The members of the Bundesrat, elected by the provincial diets (Landtage) of the nine federal States of Austria, are known as Mitglieder des Bundesrats.

=== Bulgaria ===
In Bulgaria there are 240 members of Parliament (Bulgarian: Народно събрание / Парламент; transliteration Narodno sabranie / Parlament), which are called 'Deputati' (singular Deputat). Moreover, there are 240 MPs in the normal parliament and 400 in the "Great Parliament". The Great Parliament is elected when a new constitution is needed. There have been seven Great Parliaments in modern Bulgarian history, in 1879, 1881, 1886, 1893, 1911, 1946 and 1990. MPs in Bulgaria are called депутати (deputies).

=== Cambodia ===
The member of parliament (Khmer: សមាជិកសភា) refers to the elected members of the National Assembly. There are 125 members of parliament in total. They are also alternatively called member of the National Assembly. Parliamentary elections are traditionally held every five years with no term limits imposed. The 25 provinces of Cambodia are represented by the members of Parliament in the National Assembly. A constituency may have more than one MP, depending on the population.

=== Czech Republic ===
A member of Parliament is a member of either of the two chambers of the Parliament of the Czech Republic, although the term member of Parliament of the Czech Republic is commonly referred to as deputy of the Parliament of the Czech Republic (Czech: Poslanec Parlamentu České republiky), who is a member of the lower house of the Parliament, the Chamber of Deputies. For the upper house, the Senate, the term senator is used.

=== Denmark ===
In Denmark, a member of the Folketinget (Danish: medlem af Folketinget) is one of the 179 members of the Folketinget. The title is almost always shortened to the initialism "MF".

=== France ===
In France, member of parliament refers in English to the elected (one for each of the 577 constituencies) members of the National Assembly, the lower house of the French Parliament. They are known in French as députés (deputies) and sit for five years, unless a snap election is called before the end of their term.

=== Germany ===
A member of parliament refers to the elected members of the federal Bundestag at the Reichstag building in Berlin. In German a member is called Mitglied des Bundestages (member of the Federal Diet) or officially Mitglied des Deutschen Bundestages (member of the German Federal Diet), abbreviated MdB and attached . Unofficially the term Abgeordneter (lit. 'delegate', i.e. of a certain electorate) is also common (abbreviated Abg., never follows the name but precedes it).

In accordance with article 38 of the Basic Law for the Federal Republic of Germany, which is the German constitution, "[m]embers of the German Bundestag shall be elected in general, direct, free, equal, and secret elections. They shall be representatives of the whole people, not bound by orders or instructions, and responsible only to their conscience." An important though not constitutionally required feature of German parliamentarianism is a slightly modified proportional representation.

The 16 federal states of Germany (Länder) are represented by the Bundesrat at the former Prussian House of Lords, whose members are representatives of the respective Länder's governments and not directly elected by the people.

=== Greece ===
Members of the Hellenic Parliament are known as vouleftés (βουλευτής, "councillors") in Greek, which is rendered into English as "members of parliament". The Vouli is a unicameral legislature of 300 constituency members, each elected for a four-year term.

=== Indonesia ===
Although there are no official definition to what a member of parliament is, it commonly refers to the elected members of the lower People's Representative Council (Dewan Perwakilan Rakyat, abbr. DPR), known in Indonesian as Anggota DPR (member of the DPR). Members of the upper Regional Representative Council (Dewan Perwakilan Daerah, abbr. DPD) are referred to as senator, although the term Anggota DPD (member of the DPD) is also widely used. These titles are not used in formal naming convention following a member's name unlike the Westminster system.

Currently, there are 575 and 136 members in the DPR and the DPD respectively, both elected for a renewable five-year term. Members of the DPR are required to be a member of a registered political party, whereas members of the DPD are independent.

=== Israel ===
A member of the Knesset (Hebrew: חבר הכנסת) is one of the 120 members of the Knesset. The title is usually shortened to the initialism "MK".

=== Italy ===
Members of the lower house of the Italian Parliament, the Chamber of Deputies, are known as "deputies" (deputati), while members of the upper house, the Senate of the Republic, are known as "senators" (senatori). Deputies and senators may use the style "The Honourable" (Onorevole). There are currently 400 deputies and 200 senators, who are elected in general elections held every five years. The president of the Italian Republic nominates five senators for life (senatori a vita). Emeritus presidents of the republic are also appointed senators for life. The two houses of parliament together form a perfect bicameral system, meaning they perform identical functions, but do so separately.

=== Japan ===
In Japan, both houses of today's national parliament, the National Diet (Kokkai), are directly elected, and although the two chambers differ in legislative and political authority, term length and age restriction of eligibility, the members of both houses are generally equal in personal status (financial compensation, immunity, etc.). There are currently 713 members of the National Diet (Kokkai giin, 国会議員): 465 members of the House of Representatives (Shūgiin giin, 衆議院議員) and 248 members of the House of Councillors (Sangiin giin, 参議院議員). The former are elected in general/by-/repeat elections of members of the House of Representatives (Shūgiin giin sō-/hoketsu-/sai-senkyo), the latter in regular/by-/repeat elections of members of the House of Councillors (Sangiin giin tsūjō-/hoketsu-/sai-senkyo). Under the 1947 constitution, the prime minister is elected by the National Diet and must be a member of the National Diet, as must the majority of other ministers; by practice, all prime ministers since 1947 have been members of the House of Representatives so far.

==== Empire of Japan ====
Under the constitution of the Empire of Japan, the Imperial Diet (Teikoku-gikai) was a bicameral legislature of two houses, generally equal in legislative authority, and while the members of both houses received the same financial compensation - from 1920 and 1947, ¥7500 for the two presidents, ¥4500 for the two vice-presidents, ¥3000 for all other members of both houses, except Imperial princes, dukes and marquesses—their status was different by definition: The upper house consisted mainly of hereditary nobles and lifetime-appointed peers, the lower house of elected commoners. In the First Imperial Diet in 1890, there were initially 551 members of the Imperial Diet (Teikoku-gikai giin, 帝国議会議員, or in contemporaneous script 帝國議會議員): 251 members of the House of Peers (Kizokuin giin, 貴族院議員) and 300 members of the House of Representatives (Shūgiin giin); of the House of Peers members, 10 were members of the Imperial family, 31 were hereditary members from the two upper nobility ranks, 104 were members elected in mutual elections from the three lower nobility ranks, 61 were lifetime-appointed members (many of these from the bureaucracy) and 45 were members elected by the 15 top taxpayers in each of the 45 prefectures. The number of noble and appointed members of the House of Peers was not fixed and varied gradually over time as members died or new peerages were granted; the number of elected top taxpayer seats, Imperial Academy seats (introduced in 1925), members appointed from the colonies Chōsen/Korea and Taiwan/Formosa (introduced in 1945), and the size of the House of Representatives was fixed by law, but was also changed several times over the decades. The last, 92nd Imperial Diet of 1946–1947 had 839 members - 466 members of the House of Representatives and 373 members of the House of Peers. As the regulations establishing the cabinet (naikaku) and the cabinet's prime minister (naikaku sōri-daijin) were decreed before the Imperial constitution, the prime minister did not have to be a member of the Imperial Diet, but after the establishment of the Imperial Diet in 1890, many prime ministers were appointed from the House of Peers; very few were members of the House of Representatives, viz. Takashi Hara, Osachi Hamaguchi, and Tsuyoshi Inukai.

=== Kazakhstan ===
According to the jurisdiction of the Republic of Kazakhstan, the term deputy (Kazakh: депутат, romanized: deputat) is the main and widely used word to describe a member of parliament (Kazakh: парламент депутаты, romanized: parlament deputaty) as a whole, encompassing both the lower house Mäjilis and the upper house Senate. While senator is also used to interchangeably describe a member of the Senate, the word "deputy" is the inclusive and general term for all 120 members of the Parliament.

The 98 deputies of the Mäjilis obtain their mandate through mixed-member majoritarian representation, with 29 deputies elected from single-member districts and 69 deputies from closed-list proportional representation. The Senate consists of 50 deputies, out of which 40 are indirectly elected by mäslihats (local assemblies), while the remaining 10 are appointed by the President and the Assembly of People.

=== Lebanon ===
The Parliament of Lebanon is the Lebanese national legislature. It is elected to a four-year term by universal adult suffrage in multi-member constituencies, apportioned among Lebanon's diverse Christian and Muslim denominations. Its major functions are to elect the president of the republic, to approve the government (although appointed by the president, the prime minister, along with the Cabinet, must retain the confidence of a majority in the Parliament), and to approve laws and expenditure. The name of a deputy in Arabic is Naeb (نائب). The plural of Naeb is Nuwab (نواب).

=== Netherlands ===
The Parliament of the Netherlands is known as the Staten-Generaal, the States General. It is bicameral, divided into two kamers (English: chambers). The Senate is known in Dutch as the Eerste Kamer (First Chamber) and its members as senatoren, senators. The House of Representatives, known in Dutch as the Tweede Kamer (Second Chamber), is the most important one. The important debates take place here. Also, the Second Chamber can amend proposed laws and can propose laws itself. The Senate does not have these capabilities. Its function is a more technical reviewing of laws. It can only pass a law or reject it. Both chambers are in The Hague, which is the seat of parliament but not the official capital of the Netherlands, which is Amsterdam.

The 150 members of the House of Representatives are elected by general elections every four years (or earlier if the government falls). The 75 members of the Senate are elected indirectly. The members of the twelve provincial parliaments and the councils of the three Caribbean special municipalities elect the senators. The value of a vote of a member of a provincial parliament is weighted by the population of the province. Provincial parliaments, the States Provincial, are elected by general elections every four years; a new Senate is elected three months after the provincial elections.

=== North Macedonia ===
In the Republic of North Macedonia there are 123 members of parliament (Macedonian: Sobranie) called Pratenici (singular Pratenik).

=== Norway ===
A member of parliament is an elected member of the Stortinget. They are called stortingsrepresentanter (lit. 'representatives of the Storting'). Since 2009, Norway has had a unicameral parliament, which previously consisted of the Odelstinget and Lagtinget; the Odelstinget comprised three-quarters, or 127, of the total 169 members, whereas the Lagtinget comprised the remainder. The dividing of the parliament into chambers was only used when dealing with passing regular laws and in cases of impeachment (riksrett). In other matters, such as passing the national budget or changing the constitution (the latter requiring a majority of two-thirds), the chambers were united.

The members of the unicameral parliament of Norway are chosen by popular vote for a parliamentary period of four years.

=== Philippines ===
From 1978 to 1984, the Philippine parliament was called the Batasang Pambansa (National Assembly), and its elected members were called Mambabatas Pambansa (National Assemblyman), often shortened to "MP".

==== Bangsamoro ====
In the Bangsamoro Parliament, members of the interim body, known as the Bangsamoro Transition Authority, are nominated by both the Moro Islamic Liberation Front (MILF) and the Philippine government, and appointed by the president of the Philippines.

=== Portugal ===
The Portuguese parliament is called the Assembleia da República. A member of parliament is known as a deputado, that is, a person who is appointed through democratic election to act on the people's behalf.

=== Spain ===
The word parlamento—of the same origin as Parliament in English—is used as a common name for all legislative assemblies, and hence parlamentario for the member of any of them, which can usually refer to members of:

- both chambers of the national legislature (Cortes Generales), the Congress of Deputies and the Senate.
- the regional devolved legislatures of the Autonomous Communities.
- the European Parliament.

Members of the Congress of Deputies are called diputados (deputies), implying that they are elected to act in the name and on behalf of the people they represent. It is also usual to call members of the European Parliament eurodiputados. Members of the Senate are called senadores (senators).

=== South Africa ===
The Parliament of South Africa consists of two houses: the National Assembly of South Africa (lower house) and the National Council of Provinces (upper house). Members of both houses are given the title Member of Parliament.

The National Assembly is made up of 400 members, who are all elected by the public in general elections using a proportional representation system with closed lists. The National Council of Provinces is composed of 90 delegates with 10 delegates for each of the nine provinces regardless of the population of the province. A provincial delegation consists of six permanent delegates and four special delegates. NCOP delegates are elected by the nine provincial legislatures on the day when they reconvene, usually the same day as the National Assembly. The delegates are sworn in the next day.

=== South Korea ===
A member of Parliament refers to a member of the Parliament of South Korea. A total of 253 MPs are elected using the first-past-the-post system from parliamentary constituencies, 30 MPs are elected by proportional compensation, and 17 MPs are elected by mixed member majoritarian.

In the Second Republic of Korea or if the Constitution of South Korea is amended as a parliamentary system with bicameralism, only the members of the House of Commons of South Korea are called members of Parliament, while the members of the Senate of South Korea are called senators.

The members of provincial legislatures are called members of the Legislative Assembly or MLA. In some provinces, such individuals are called councillors and members of the provincial parliament.

Members of the National Assembly enjoy various privileges, including immunity from arrest and immunity for legislative acts, along with high power, allowances, and extensive institutional support such as offices, official vehicles, and drivers. Each lawmaker may employ up to nine butler, whose salaries are fully funded by the state. On this foundation of privileges, political experience, personal networks, and local power bases accumulate, making it easier for children or relatives to enter politics. Although power is not legally inherited, in practice this creates a system in which political influence is passed down within families, resembling a form of aristocratic succession.

=== Sweden ===
Members of parliament refers to the elected members of the Riksdag. In Swedish, an MP is usually referred to as a riksdagsledamot (member of the Riksdag) or a riksdagsman (gentleman of the Riksdag). The former is in more common use today, especially in official contexts, due to its status as a unisex word, while the latter was used more often historically and literally refers to a male MP exclusively.

The parliament is a unicameral assembly with 349 members who are chosen every four years in general elections. To become an MP, a person must be entitled to vote (i.e. be a Swedish citizen, be at least 18 years old and be or have been resident in Sweden) and must be nominated by a political party. The MPs are elected by proportionality in constituencies across the nation. To decide which candidate will be elected the modified Sainte-Laguë method is used. This method usually but not always gives an accurate result in proportion to cast votes.

The salaries of the MPs are decided by the Riksdag Pay Committee (Riksdagens arvodesnämnd), a government agency under the Riksdag. Since 1 November 2007, the basic monthly pay of an MP is SEK52,900 (ca. US$6,500). The pay of the speaker is SEK126,000 a month (ca. US$15,000), which is the same as that of the prime minister. The deputy speakers receive an increment of 30% of the pay of a member. The chairs and deputy chairs of the parliamentary committees receive a similar increment of 20% and 15% respectively.

According to a survey investigation by the sociologist Jenny Hansson, Swedish national parliamentarians have an average workweek of 66 hours, including side responsibilities. Hansson's investigation further reports that the average Swedish national parliamentarian sleeps 6.5 hours per night.

=== Syria ===
A member of the People's Assembly (Arabic: عضو مجلس الشعب) refers to members of the Parliament of Syria. Historically, members of the Syrian parliament have been referred to in Arabic as nā'ib (نائب, "deputy"), plural nuwāb (نواب), a usage rooted in the legislature's earlier incarnation as the Chamber of Deputies (1932–1963). Following the parliament's reconstitution as the People's Assembly under Ba'athist rule in 1971, members came to be more commonly styled "member of the People's Assembly" in official and state-media usage. Nonetheless, "deputy" has persisted as a recognised designation, including in coverage of the current transitional-era Assembly formed after 2024.

=== Thailand ===
In the Kingdom of Thailand, members of parliament (Thai: สมาชิกรัฐสภา; RTGS: Samachik Ratthasapha) refer to the members of the National Assembly of Thailand, that is, the members of the House of Representatives and the senators. Following the military coup d'état on 19 September 2006, all members of the assembly were suspended from duty until the next election. The assembly was fully reconvened after the general elections under a slightly amended new constitution. Under the 2007 constitution there are 650 members of parliament, consisting of 500 members in the House of Representatives, of which 375 elected from constituencies and the other 125 by party-list, and 150 senators.

=== Turkey ===
In the Republic of Turkey, a member of parliament is an elected member of the Grand National Assembly of Turkey (Turkish: Türkiye Büyük Millet Meclisi, TBMM), which has 600 members elected at a general election for a term of office of five years.

=== Ukraine ===
A people's deputy of Ukraine (Ukrainian: народний депутат України, narodnyi deputat Ukrayiny) is a member of parliament or legislator elected by a popular vote to the Verkhovna Rada (the unicameral parliament of Ukraine). Often people's deputies of Ukraine are referred to simply as deputies.

The main statutes that define the order of elections, rights and duties of the people's deputies of Ukraine are outlined in Articles 76–81 of the Constitution of Ukraine. There are 450 people's deputies of Ukraine who are elected based on the general, equal and direct electoral right for five years. The deputies may be appointed to various parliamentary positions such as the chairperson (speaker) of parliament, a head of a committee or a parliamentary faction, etc. Upon its appointment, to the office, each people's deputy of Ukraine receives a deputy mandate.

People's deputies that run for parliament as self-nominated candidates can join factions if they wish.

== See also ==
- Deputy (legislator)
- Member of Congress
- Australia and New Zealand Association of Clerks-at-the-Table, an association with the aim of advancing the professional development of parliamentarians.
