= Clerk of the New Zealand House of Representatives =

Officer of the New Zealand House of Representatives

Clerk of the NZ House of Representatives
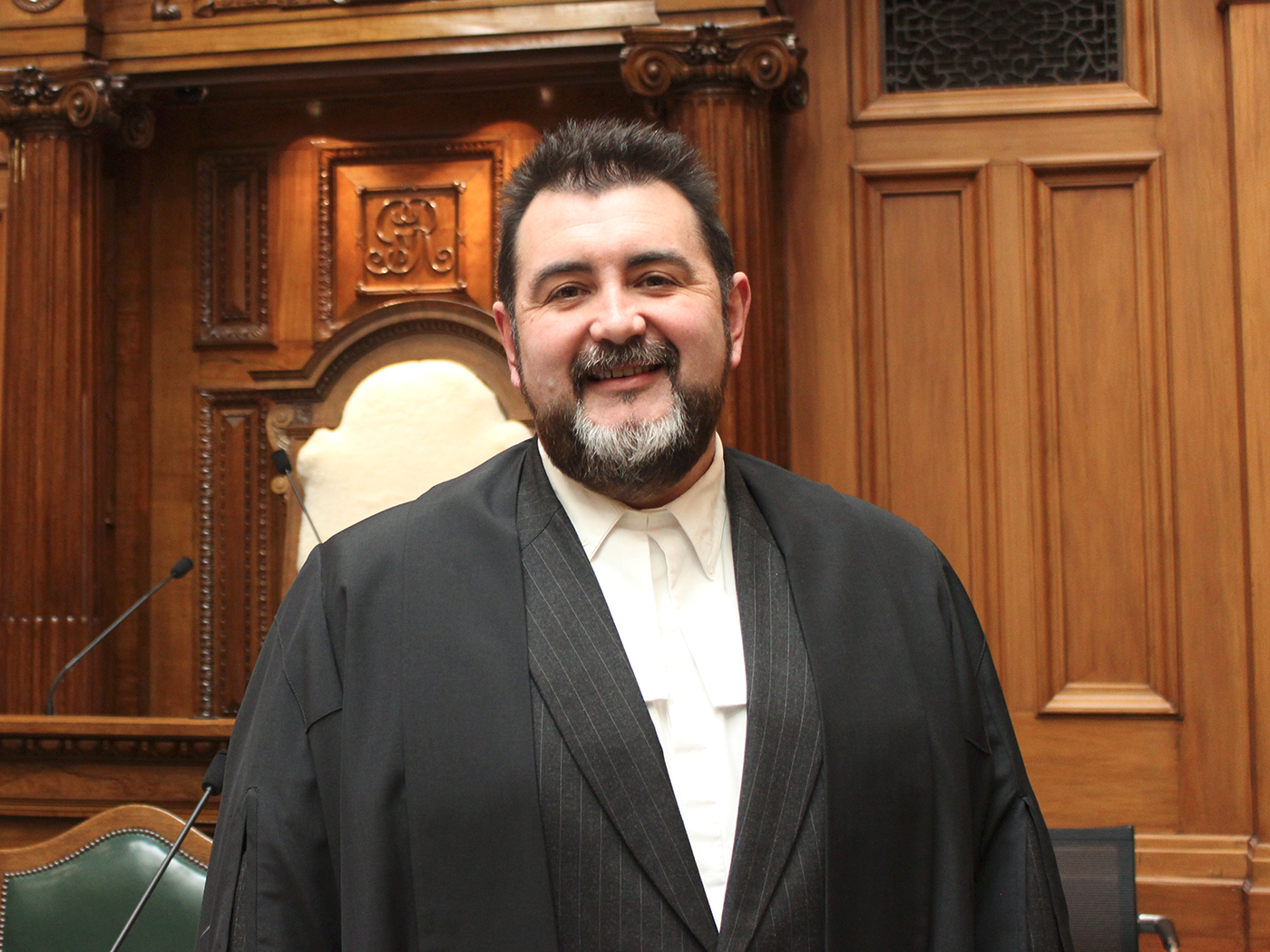
- Incumbent; David Wilson since 6 July 2015
- Office of the Clerk of the House of Representatives (Te Tari o te Manahautū o te Whare Māngai)
- Reports to: Speaker of the New Zealand House of Representatives
- Seat: New Zealand Parliament Buildings Wellington
- Nominator: Speaker of the House after consultation with Prime Minister, Leader of the Opposition, et al
- Appointer: Governor-General of New Zealand; On the recommendation of the Speaker of the House
- Term length: Seven years; Eligible for reappointment
- Formation: 1854
- First holder: James Coates
- Deputy: Suzanne Jones, Deputy Clerk of the House
- Website: https://www.parliament.nz/?lang=en

The Clerk of the New Zealand House of Representatives is an officer of the New Zealand House of Representatives and is the principal officer (chief executive) of the Office of the Clerk of the House of Representatives.

== Role ==
The clerk of the House of Representatives advises the Speaker of the New Zealand House of Representatives and members of parliament on matters of parliamentary procedure. Other functions of the clerk of the House include: to record the proceedings and decisions of the House, to certify bills ready for royal assent, to issue the Order Paper (order of business) for each sitting day, to administer the oath or affirmation of allegiance for members of Parliament after a general election, and to oversee the provision of secretariat services for the House and its committees.

Clerk David Wilson took office on 6 July 2015 following the retirement of Mary Winifred Harris.

With the Parliament (Repeals and Amendments) Act 2025 being given royal assent on 12 November 2025, the Clerk's main constituting instrument, the Clerk of the House of Representatives Act 1988 was officially repealed on 13 November 2025.

== List of Clerks of the New Zealand House of Representatives ==
	Name	Portrait	Term of office
1	James Coates		1854
2	Francis Eastwood Campbell		1854–1889
3	George Friend		1889–1898
4	Henry Otterson		1898–1915
5	Alexander Lowe		1915–1919
6	Edward William Kane		1920–1929
7	Thomas Donald Horn Hall		1930–1945
8	Grafton Bothamley		1945–1946
9	Henry Nelson Dollimore		1946–1971
10	Eric Roussell		1971–1976
11	Charles Philip Littlejohn		1976–1985
12	David McGee		1985–2007
13	Mary Harris		2007–2015
14	David Wilson		2015–present
