= Australia and New Zealand Association of Clerks-at-the-Table =

The Australia and New Zealand Association of Clerks-at-the-Table (ANZACATT) is an association involving the Parliaments of Australia and New Zealand with the aim of advancing the professional development of its members, particularly in relation to the principles of parliamentary systems and parliamentary procedure. It was formed in 2001 and now comprises 130 members from each House of Parliament in Australia and New Zealand.

The sharing of professional experiences and knowledge about the institution of Parliament and the development of links with similar organizations are also amongst the Association's aims. Any officer of a House of Parliament in Parliament of Australia and New Zealand who is employed in the capacity of Clerk-at-the-Table and is eligible to be a member of the Society of Clerks-at-the-Table is eligible to be nominated for membership.
