= The Northern Club =

Private members' club in Auckland, New Zealand

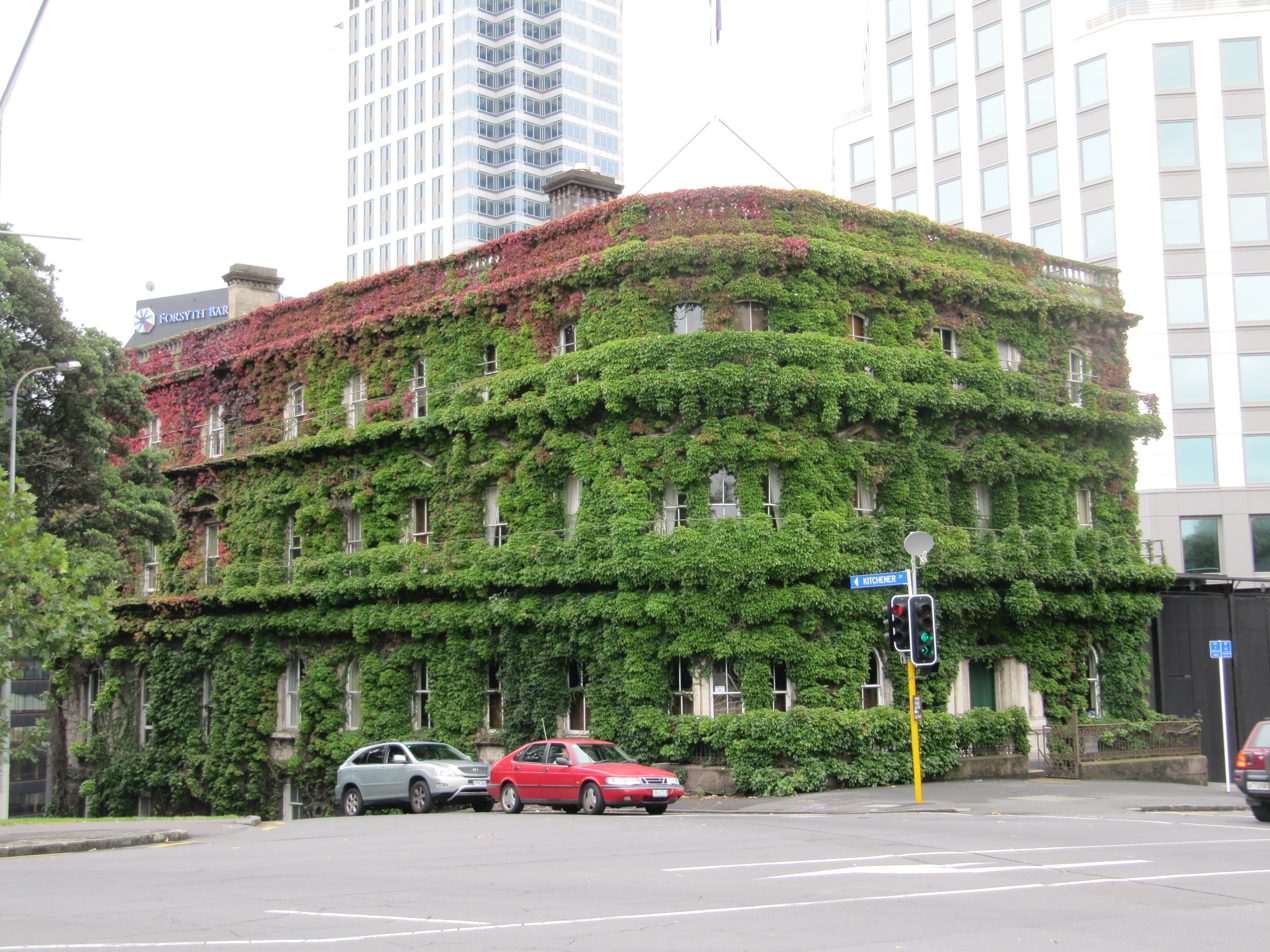
- The Northern Club building in 2011
- Former names: Royal Hotel

General information
- Architectural style: Italianate
- Location: 19 Princes Street, Auckland, New Zealand
- Coordinates: 36.848114°S 174.76981°E
- Completed: 1867

Technical details
- Floor count: 4

Design and construction
- Architect: Edward Mahoney

Website
- https://northernclub.co.nz

Heritage New Zealand – Category 1
- Designated: 24 March 1988
- Reference no.: 663

References
- "Northern Club Building". New Zealand Heritage List/Rārangi Kōrero. Heritage New Zealand.

The Northern Club is a private members' club in Auckland, New Zealand. Founded in 1869, today it has more than 2,000 members, drawn from the city's professional and business community. The club's main building is designated as a Category I historic building by the New Zealand Historic Places Trust.

== History ==
The Northern Club was founded by a group of prominent professional and business men in 1867 when the idea of gentlemen's clubs was at its peak throughout the British Empire. The club's founders agreed to purchase a handsome quarrystone building overlooking Albert Barracks in Princes Street.

The four-storey building, a high-rise in its own time, was originally designed as a hotel and was built on the first section sold at Auckland's inaugural land sale in 1841. Following the purchase, architect Edward Ramsey was commissioned to rearrange the hotel's internal rooms for use by the club's 120 founding members.

In 1991, the club voted to admit women and today has a membership of both men and women. Membership of the Northern Club attracted many leaders of the Auckland community, and the club has played an active and sometimes pivotal role in the history of New Zealand's largest city. In 2010, the Northern Club absorbed the Auckland Club, adding over NZ$3 million in assets to the club, and some 250 members.

== Background ==
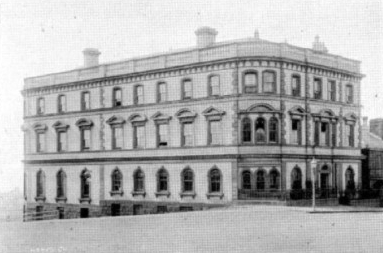
The building c. 1900

The Northern Club building has a long history of association with Auckland's social elite. Built in 1867 as the Royal Hotel, it became a gentlemen's club two years later. Originally designed by Edward Mahoney, the three-storeyed building was located in a prestigious part of the settlement, close to the former Government House and provincial council. It was erected in a fashionable Italianate style, the brick structure being rendered externally to appear masonry-built. As the Royal, it replaced a timber structure of the same name and gained a reputation as the grandest establishment in town. Early tenants included the provincial government, which rented rooms as offices, and the Auckland Institute and Museum, while part of the first floor was a British Army officers' mess used by soldiers from the nearby Albert Barracks.

The Northern Club purchased the building in 1869, the club having been formed earlier in the year. Gentlemen's clubs developed in nineteenth-century Britain, enabling social and business networks to be maintained. Early members of the club included a future Prime Minister, Julius Vogel (1835–1899), and prominent businessmen such as Thomas Russell (1830–1904) and David Nathan (1816–1886). Governors of the colony were among those invited as guests, reinforcing the exclusivity of the organisation. The club refurbished the interior, and in the process reinforced social divisions through the building's layout. Service rooms for employees were located in the basement and members' reception rooms on the ground floor, while personal servants were not allowed in the upper chambers, although exceptions were made for governors.

Expansion to the facilities generally occurred during periods of economic boom. A new dining room and fifteen bedrooms were constructed at the rear of the building in 1883–1884, and accommodation for residential staff was added in the 1920s. Exclusively male in its membership for over 120 years, facilities for women were introduced only gradually. The first female member was admitted in 1990, shortly after the earliest woman after-dinner speaker, the Minister of Finance Ruth Richardson, who addressed the club in 1989. Today nearly 20 per cent of members are female.

The Northern Club building is significant as one of the oldest surviving clubs in Auckland, and one of the city's oldest hotels. It has strong links to early colonial institutions such as the provincial government and British army, as well as prominent individuals in New Zealand history.

It is the earliest building in the historic Princes Street streetscape, with significant landmark qualities that include its distinctive cover of Virginia creeper, planted in 1927.

In 2018, The Northern Club elected its first woman President, Mrs Victoria Carter ONZM. In 2019 the club celebrated its 150th birthday. A modern addition to the club, the Bankside Bar & Lounge designed by Nat and Pip Cheshire was opened after a blessing by local iwi, Ngati Whatua Orakei and the bishop of Auckland.
