= New Zealand Parliamentary Service =

Government agency

New Zealand Parliamentary Service is an agency established in 1985 to provide support services to the New Zealand's elected Members of Parliament (MPs). Their services are outlined in the Parliamentary Services Act 2000. Parliamentary Service employs the staff of the MP's including those in electorate and community offices and also operates Parliament's corporate functions such as asset management and Information Communications Technology (ICT). They are also responsible for the Parliamentary Library.

== Services ==
Parliamentary Service has a staff of around 700 people and provides administration and support to the members of parliament, which includes the New Zealand Government who make policy and run the country, and all elected MPs who keep the government accountable under New Zealand's Westminster system of government. The services are located within the New Zealand Parliament buildings, in Wellington. They service New Zealand's Parliament, Members of Parliament and other agencies of the Parliamentary Precinct, such as the Office of the Clerk of the House of Representatives, the Parliamentary Counsel Office, the Department of the Prime Minister and Cabinet, and the Department of Internal Affairs’ Ministerial and Secretariat Support Services. They are in charge of funding entitlements in accordance directions given by the Speaker of the House.

In New Zealand the Parliament is based in the capital Wellington, where there are several parliamentary buildings that house the governing body of New Zealand. Parliamentary Services are also in charge of supporting parliament grounds which are open to the public and they manage the buildings within the parliamentary area including public tours.

Another one of the functions of Parliamentary Service is to prove education and information to the public, defined as the Parliamentary Information Service. The Parliamentary Library has been a part of Parliamentary service since 1985, after being established in 1858 and is open to the public. Parliamentary Service has a role in managing public questions submitted about Parliament.

== History and legislative status ==
The Parliamentary Service was established in 1985 under Parliament reforms by the fourth Labour government of New Zealand under Prime Minister David Lange, through the Parliamentary Service Act 1985. This included the establishment of a Parliamentary Service Commission. This commission chaired by the Speaker of the House has people from each of the parliamentary political parties and reaches decisions by consensus. Attending the first meeting on 2 October 1985 were Jim Bolger (National), Michael Cullen (Labour), Jonathan Hunt (Labour), Don McKinnon (National), John Terris (Labour) and Rob Storey (National). The first Speaker was Gerard Wall.

The 1985 act states:

“The principal duties of the Parliamentary Service shall be to provide to the House of Representatives and to members of the House of Representatives such administrative and support services as may be necessary or desirable.”

Explicitly is also stated what Parliamentary Services are not: ‘an instrument of the Executive Government of New Zealand’ or a ‘government department’. The act was repealed in 2000, under the fifth Labour government of New Zealand, led by Prime Minister Helen Clark. The Speaker of the House of Representatives determines the services that the Parliamentary Service will provide to the House and to members. Through section 4(b) of the Parliamentary Service Act 2000, the service is accountable to the Speaker, specifically:

“to provide for the governance arrangements of the Parliamentary Service, in particular, by making the Chief Executive of the Parliamentary Service responsible to the Speaker:”

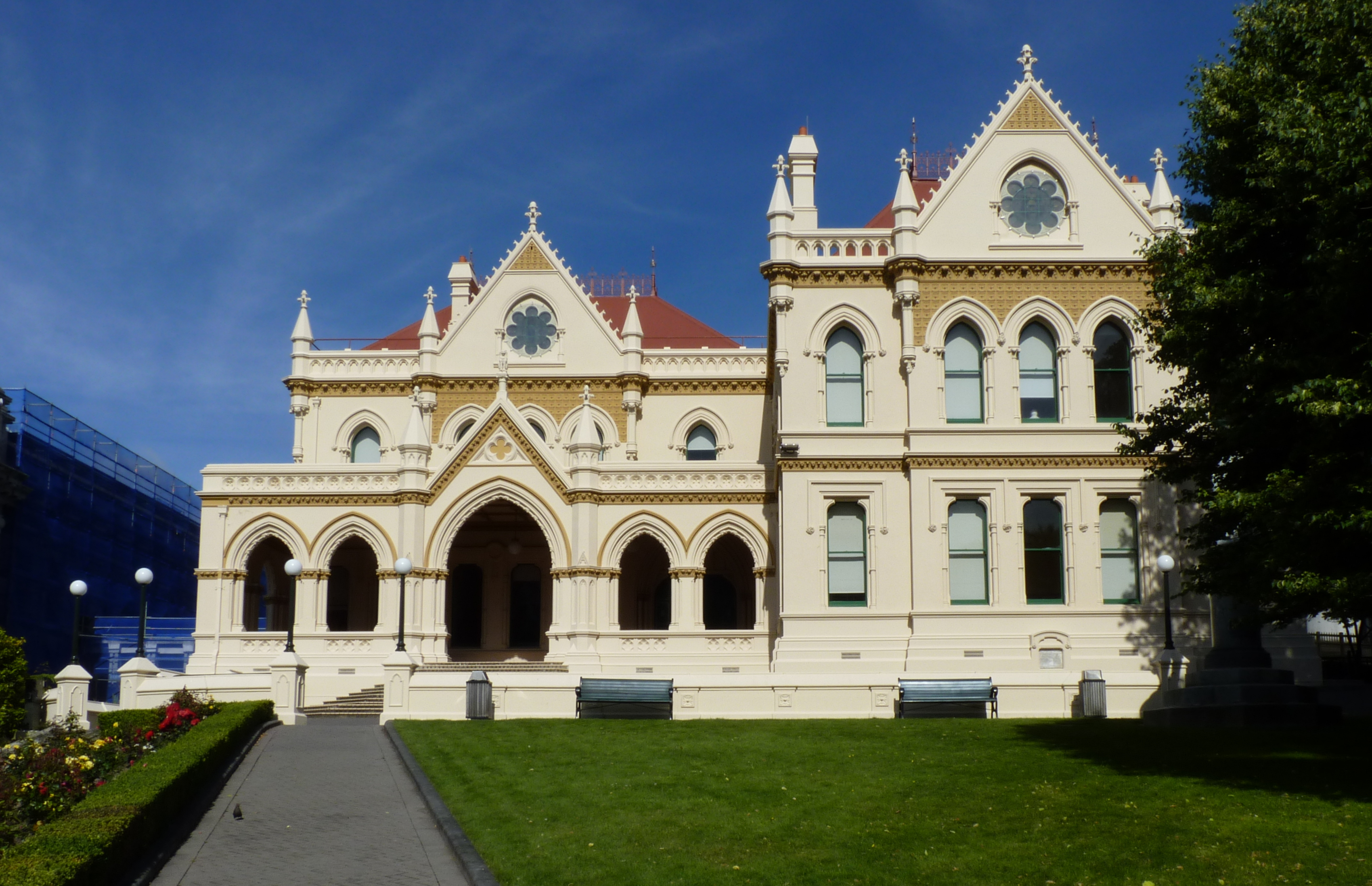
Parliamentary Library, Wellington, New Zealand

The Parliamentary Service Act 2000 expanded on the duties of the service and what it encompasses. This includes to administer some of the payment of funding entitlements for parliamentary purposes, including the payment of travel entitlements to former members of Parliament. The Parliamentary Service Act 2000 states that with the approval of the Speaker, the service may provide administrative and support services for the following persons and agencies:

- “(a) any officer of the House of Representatives:
- (b) any officer of Parliament:
- (c) any office of Parliament:
- (d) any department or other instrument of the Crown."

== Controversies ==
170 Parliamentary staff who belong to the Public Service Association took industrial action in 2009 (security officers, library staff, reception workers, building maintenance staff, messengers and other administrative staff at Parliament) which included a strike to protest a pay freeze and redundancy cut.

An inquiry that investigated the leaking of the Kitteridge report on the New Zealand spy agency the Government Communications Security Bureau (GCSB) to a Fairfax reporter Parliamentary Service was found in 2013 to give information without authorisation which acting head David Stevenson said they would work to not repeat.

A review that took place over the December 2018 to March 2019 found that 'bullying and harassment were systemic in the parliamentary workplace'. Parliamentary Service Member of Parliament (MP) support staff said there was a power imbalance between the MP's whom they worked for and Parliamentary Service who employs them.
