= Office of the Clerk of the House of Representatives =

- Te Tari o te Manahautū o te Whare Māngai

Agency overview
- Headquarters: Parliament Buildings, Wellington
- Employees: 100
- Annual budget: Total budget for 2019/20; Vote Office of the Clerk ▲$23,248,000
- Minister responsible: Gerry Brownlee, Speaker of the House of Representatives
- Agency executives: David Wilson, Clerk of the House of Representatives; Suzanne Jones, Deputy Clerk of the House of Representatives
- Website: www3.parliament.nz/en/footer/about-us/office-of-the-clerk

The Office of the Clerk of the House of Representatives (Māori: Te Tari o te Manahautū o te Whare Māngai) is a New Zealand public sector organisation.

== Purpose ==
The Office of the Clerk is the legislature’s secretariat. It provides specialist advice on procedure and parliamentary law and secretariat services to the House of Representatives. The Office of the Clerk is a politically independent organisation, providing services to Parliament, as distinct from services to the Government, and providing services to members in their parliamentary roles rather than in their party or electorate capacities.

Although the Office of the Clerk’s primary client group is members of Parliament and its principal relationships are with the Speaker, with other presiding officers, and with committee chairs, it also deals with office holders such as the Leader of the House, party leaders, and party whips, and with members’ staff.

== Legislative provision ==
The Office of the Clerk carries out the functions required under section 3 of the Clerk of the House of Representatives Act 1988, which provides that:

“The functions of the Clerk of the House of Representatives shall be—

(a) to note all proceedings of the House of Representatives and of any committee of the House:
(b) to carry out such duties and exercise such powers as may be conferred on the Clerk of the House of Representatives by law or by the Standing Orders and practice of the House of Representatives:
(c) to act as the principal officer of the Office of the Clerk of the House of Representatives and, in that capacity, to manage that office efficiently, effectively, and economically:
(d) to ensure that staff of the Office of the Clerk of the House of Representatives carry out their duties (including duties imposed on them by law or by the Standing Orders or practice of the House of Representatives) and maintain—

(i) proper standards of integrity and conduct; and
(ii) concern for the public interest:

(e) to be responsible, under the direction of the Speaker of the House of Representatives, for the official reporting of the proceedings of the House of Representatives and its committees.”
