= 1911 Auckland City mayoral election =

New Zealand mayoral election

← 1910	24 April 1911	1912 →
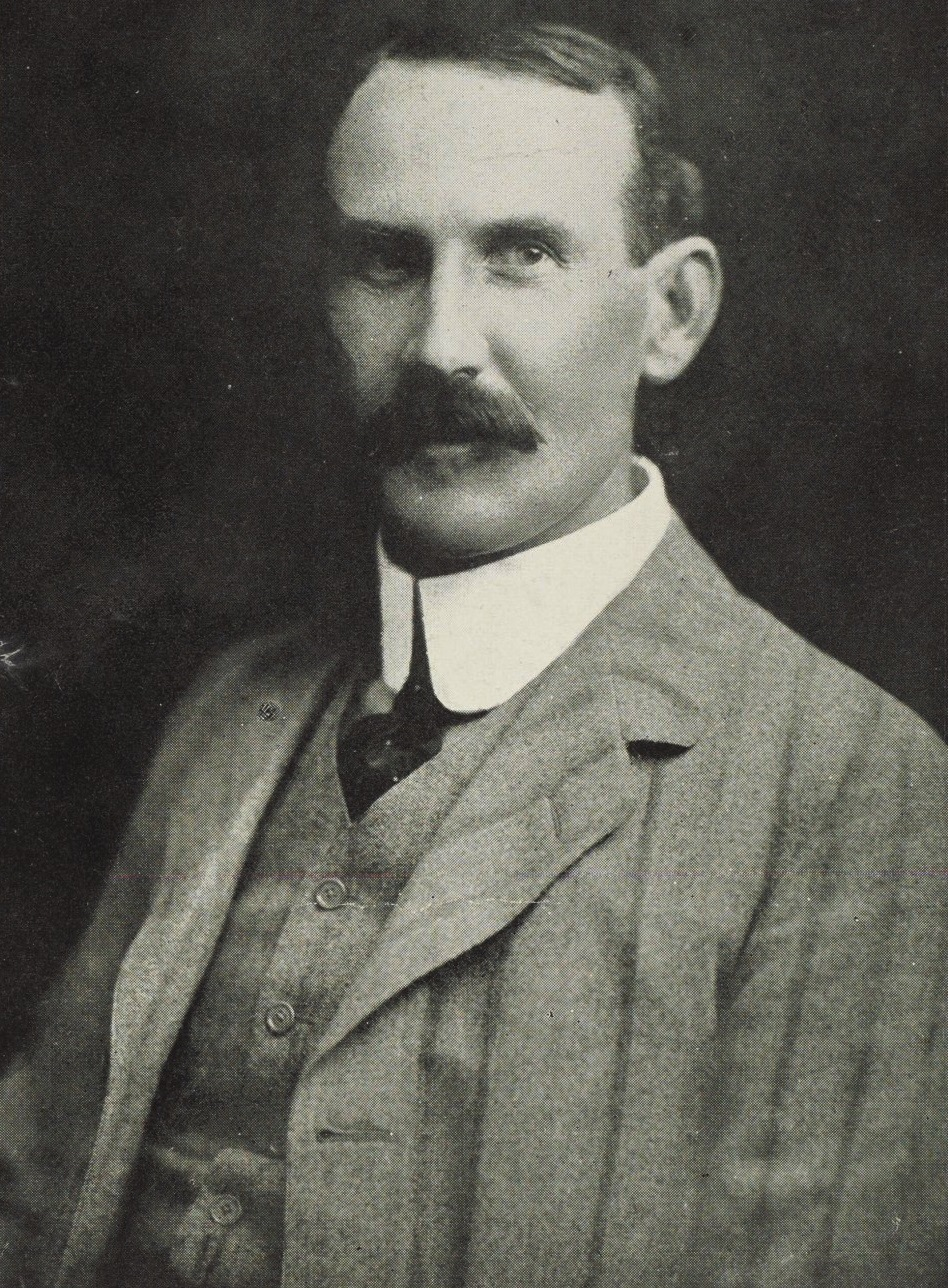
Candidate	James Parr
Party	Independent
Popular vote	Unopposed
Mayor before election
Lemuel Bagnall
Elected mayor
James Parr

The 1911 Auckland City mayoral election was part of the New Zealand local elections held that same year. In 1911, elections were held for the Mayor of Auckland plus other local government positions including fifteen city councillors. The polling was conducted using the standard first-past-the-post electoral method.

== Background ==
Incumbent mayor Lemuel Bagnall did not seek re-election and was replaced by councillor James Parr.

== Councillor results ==
1911 Auckland City Council election
Party	Candidate	Votes	%	±%
Citizens	John Court	4,069	75.88	
Citizens	Andrew Entrican	4,052	75.56	+5.46
Citizens	James Mennie	3,818	71.20	+3.03
Independent	James Gleeson	3,385	63.12	
Independent	Maurice Casey	3,342	62.32	+3.76
Citizens	Henry Shaw	3,207	59.80	+12.69
Citizens	Peter Mitchell Mackay	3,191	59.51	−8.32
Citizens	Robert Tudehope	3,126	58.29	−8.41
Independent	George Knight	3,114	58.07	−6.50
Independent	George Read	2,945	54.92	−0.59
Citizens	James Samuel Dickson	2,917	54.40	
Citizens	Patrick Nerheny	2,895	53.99	−2.37
Citizens	Jonathan Trevethick	2,751	51.30	
Citizens	Ralph Thomas Michaels	2,739	51.08	+10.86
Citizens	Frederick Gaudin	2,679	49.96	+3.02
Independent	Robert Farrell	2,527	47.12	
Citizens	John Patterson	2,500	46.62	−8.20
Independent	William Thompson	2,332	43.49	−4.25
Independent	George Tutt	2,091	38.99	−18.08
Citizens	Matthew John Bennett	2,045	38.13	
Labour	Thomas Walsh	1,631	30.41	
Labour	George Ingram	1,525	28.44	
Labour	William Moxsom	1,479	27.58	
Independent	Harold Schmidt	1,084	20.21	
