= 1913 Auckland City mayoral election =

New Zealand mayoral election

← 1912	30 April 1913	1914 →
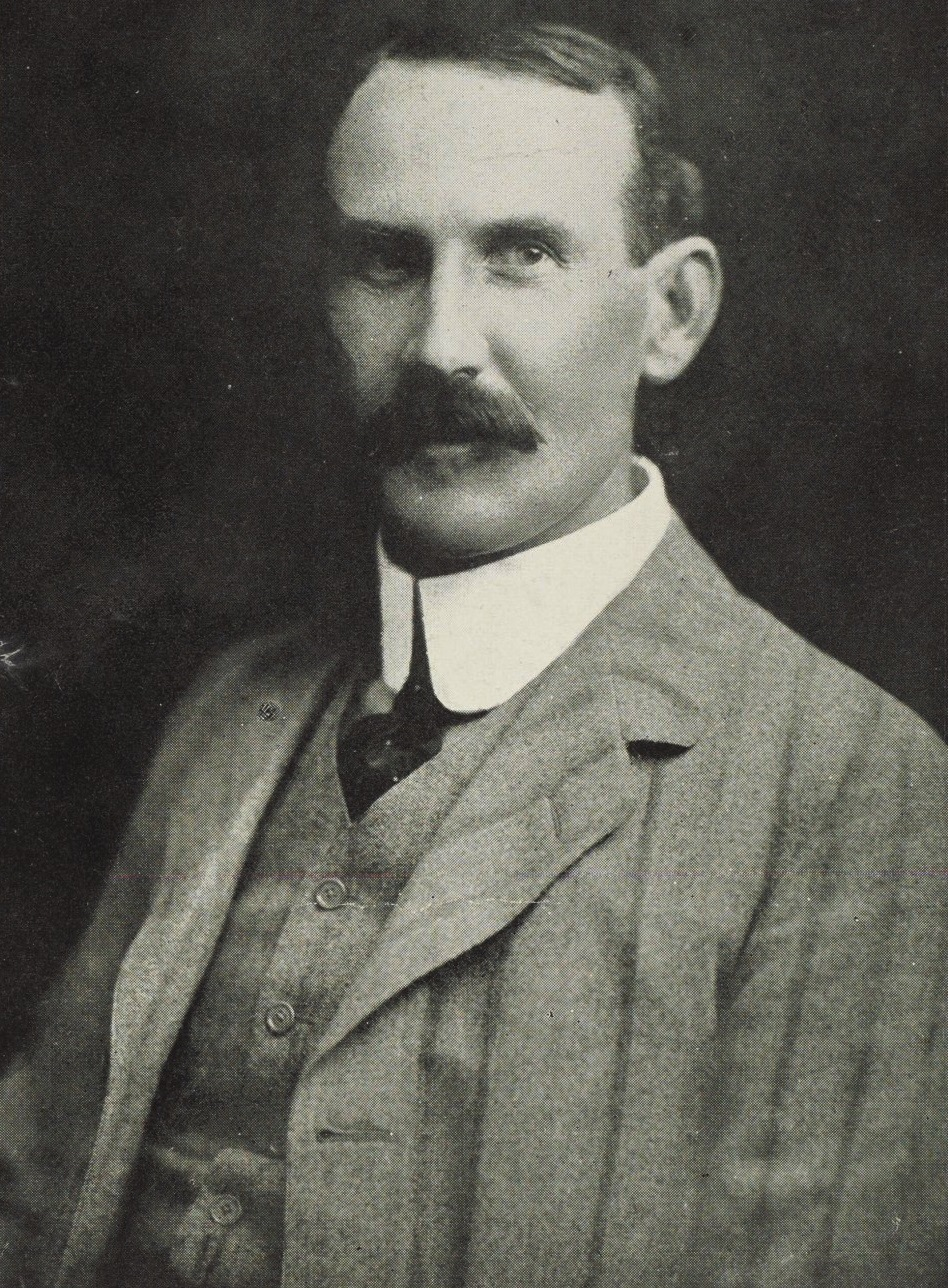
Candidate	James Parr
Party	Citizens
Popular vote	unopposed
Mayor before election
James Parr
Elected mayor
James Parr

The 1913 Auckland City mayoral election was part of the New Zealand local elections held that same year. In 1913, elections were held for the Mayor of Auckland plus other local government positions including eighteen city councillors. The polling was conducted using the standard first-past-the-post electoral method.

== Background ==
James Parr was re-elected unopposed. In 1913 the Borough of Parnell was amalgamated with Auckland City which saw the number of councillors increased from fifteen to eighteen.

== Councillor results ==
1913 Auckland City Council election
Party	Candidate	Votes	%	±%
Citizens	John Court	5,904	76.19	+0.31
Citizens	Andrew Entrican	5,830	75.23	−0.33
Citizens	James Mennie	5,092	65.71	−5.49
Citizens	Robert Tudehope	4,850	62.58	−4.29
Citizens	Patrick Nerheny	4,844	62.51	+8.52
Citizens	Maurice Casey	4,683	60.43	−1.89
Independent	Harold D. Heather	4,265	55.03	
Independent	Horatio Bagnall	4,252	54.87	
Citizens	Frederick Gaudin	4,131	53.31	+3.35
Citizens	George Knight	4,113	53.07	−5.00
Citizens	George Read	3,992	51.51	−3.41
Citizens	Peter Mitchell Mackay	3,977	51.32	−8.19
Citizens	Jonathan Trevethick	3,880	50.07	−1.23
Independent	Alfred Hall-Skelton	3,868	49.91	
Citizens	James Gleeson	3,731	48.14	−14.98
Independent	Ellen Melville	3,601	46.47	
Citizens	Ralph Thomas Michaels	3,429	44.25	−6.83
Independent	Richard Briggs	3,426	44.21	
Independent	Joseph Lyons Scott	3,233	41.72	
Independent	George Edward Davis	3,187	41.12	
Citizens	John Patterson	2,926	37.75	−8.87
Independent	Neville Newcombe	2,850	36.77	
United Labour	Thomas Long	2,822	36.41	
Independent	Sydney Moore-Jones	2,802	36.15	
Independent	William Thompson	2,730	35.23	−8.26
Independent	George William Murray	2,693	34.75	
Independent	Joseph Francis McMahon	2,525	32.58	
Independent	William Thompson	2,429	31.34	
Independent	Charles Edgar Palmer	2,417	31.19	
United Labour	Arthur Rosser	2,373	30.62	
Independent	Percy Spencer	2,213	28.55	
Independent	Francis Rowe	1,976	25.50	
Independent	Ernest Gilbert Skeates	1,717	22.15	
Independent	Gollan McLean Newton	1,317	16.99	
Independent	George Scarborough	976	12.59	
