= 1915 Auckland City mayoral election =

New Zealand mayoral election

← 1914	1 May 1915	1917 →
- Turnout: 14,684
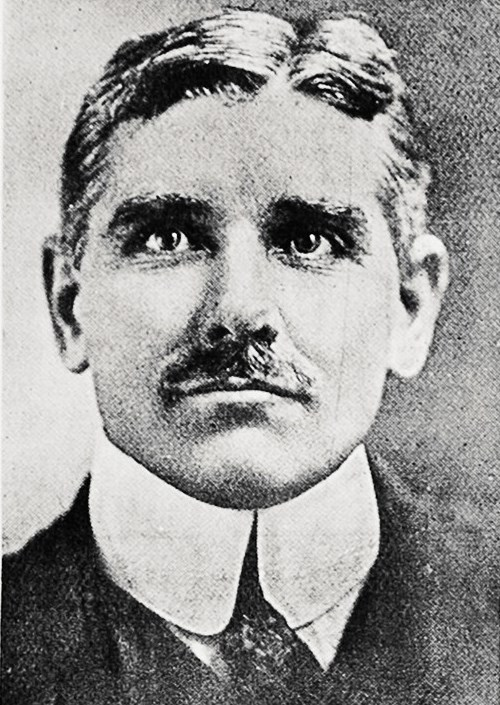

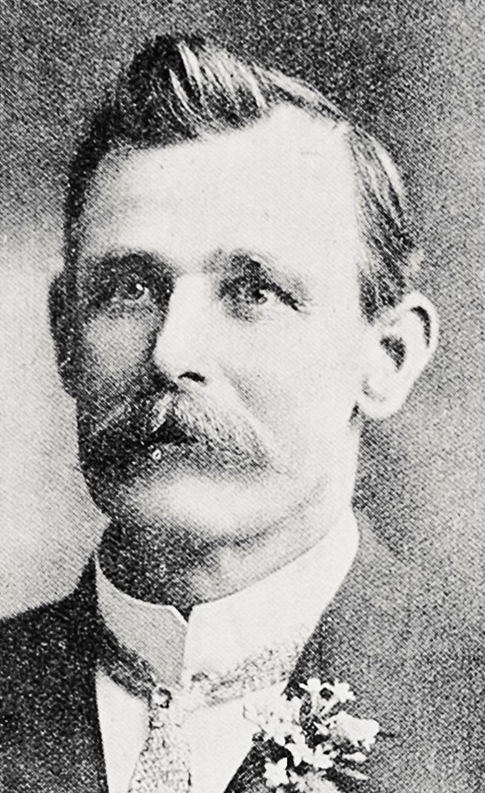
Candidate	James Gunson	Robert Tudehope
Party	Citizens	Independent
Popular vote	8,643	5,801
Percentage	58.85	39.50
Mayor before election
James Parr
Elected mayor
James Gunson

The 1915 Auckland City mayoral election was part of the New Zealand local elections held that same year. In 1915, elections were held for the Mayor of Auckland plus other local government positions including twenty-one city councillors. The polling was conducted using the standard first-past-the-post electoral method.

== Background ==
This was the first election following the Borough of Grey Lynn's amalgamation with Auckland City which saw the number of councillors increased from eighteen to twenty-one.

== Mayoralty results ==
1915 Auckland mayoral election
Party	Candidate	Votes	%	±%
Citizens	James Gunson	8,643	58.85	
Independent	Robert Tudehope	5,801	39.50	
Informal votes		240	1.63	
Majority		2,842	19.35	
Turnout		14,684		

== Councillor results ==
1915 Auckland City Council election
Party	Candidate	Votes	%	±%
Citizens	Andrew Entrican	8,542	62.42	−12.81
Citizens	Ellen Melville	7,220	52.76	+6.29
Citizens	Patrick Nerheny	6,949	50.78	−14.43
Citizens	Maurice Casey	6,942	50.73	−9.70
Citizens	George Knight	6,886	50.32	−2.75
Citizens	Horatio Bagnall	6,619	48.37	+6.50
Citizens	Peter Mitchell Mackay	6,332	46.27	−5.05
Independent	Ernest Davis	6,249	45.66	
Citizens	George Baildon	6,232	45.54	
Citizens	James Alexander Warnock	6,186	45.20	
Citizens	Harold D. Heather	6,177	45.14	−9.89
Citizens	William Holdsworth	5,770	42.16	
Citizens	Jonathan Trevethick	5,711	41.73	−8.34
Citizens	Alfred Hall-Skelton	5,423	39.63	−10.28
Independent	John Dempsey	5,321	38.88	
Citizens	Edwin James Carr	5,203	38.02	
Independent	John Burton	5,043	36.85	
Independent	Ralph Thomas Michaels	4,860	35.51	−8.74
Independent	Sydney Moore-Jones	4,613	33.71	−2.44
Independent	George William Murray	4,531	33.11	
Independent	Frederick Brinsden	4,454	32.54	
Citizens	William Donald	4,376	31.97	
Independent	Arthur Anthony Rose	3,779	27.61	
Independent	Walter Harry Murray	3,648	26.65	
Independent	Percy Spender	3,620	26.45	
Independent	William Richardson	3,587	26.21	
Social Democrat	Michael Joseph Savage	3,580	26.16	
Independent	William Thompson	3,574	26.11	−9.12
Independent	Charles Edgar Palmer	3,490	25.50	
Social Democrat	Tom Bloodworth	3,326	24.30	
Independent	Frederick David Parsons	3,292	24.05	
Social Democrat	Thomas Long	3,040	22.21	−14.20
Social Democrat	Wesley Richards	2,930	21.41	
Independent	Joseph Zahara	2,426	17.72	
Social Democrat	Charles Arthur Watts	2,129	15.55	
Social Democrat	Oscar McBrine	2,010	14.68	
