= 1919 Auckland City mayoral election =

New Zealand mayoral election

- 30 April 1919
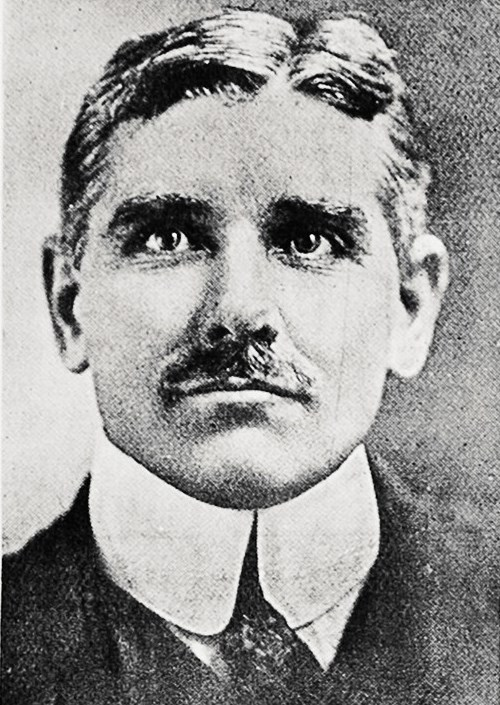
Candidate	James Gunson
Party	Citizens
Popular vote	unopposed
Mayor before election
James Gunson
Elected mayor
James Gunson

The 1919 Auckland City mayoral election was part of the New Zealand local elections held that same year. In 1919, elections were held for the Mayor of Auckland plus other local government positions including twenty-one city councillors. The polling was conducted using the standard first-past-the-post electoral method.

Incumbent mayor James Gunson was declared re-elected unopposed, with no other candidates emerging.

== Councillor results ==
1919 Auckland City Council election
Party	Candidate	Votes	%	±%
Citizens	Andrew Entrican	5,549	67.87	−4.24
Citizens	Ellen Melville	5,210	63.42	+1.65
Citizens	Harold D. Heather	4,896	59.30	−0.99
Citizens	William Holdsworth	4,808	58.14	−0.94
Labour	Tom Bloodworth	4,798	58.01	
Independent	Ernest Davis	4,754	57.43	+4.18
Citizens	Horatio Bagnall	4,681	56.47	+6.62
Citizens	Emily Maguire	4,680	56.46	
Citizens	George Knight	4,631	55.82	−0.08
Citizens	James Alexander Warnock	4,557	54.85	−1.58
Citizens	Patrick Nerheny	4,551	54.77	−7.06
Citizens	Peter Mitchell Mackay	4,380	52.52	0.98
Labour	Michael Joseph Savage	4,338	51.97	
Citizens	George Baildon	4,188	50.01	−5.10
Citizens	John Burton	4,134	49.29	−5.27
Citizens	John Dempsey	4,133	49.28	+7.36
Citizens	John Barr Paterson	4,104	48.90	+5.64
Citizens	Alfred Hall-Skelton	4,047	48.15	+0.11
Labour	George Davis	3,781	44.65	
Citizens	Jonathan Trevethick	3,488	40.81	−4.82
Citizens	Frederick Brinsden	3,486	40.78	−12.04
Independent	James Francis Hosking	3,412	39.81	−8.89
Labour	Ted Phelan	3,275	38.01	
Labour	Robert Frederick Way	3,067	35.28	
Labour	Oscar McBrine	3,048	35.03	
Labour	James Horace Mortenson	2,819	32.02	
Labour	William Moxsom	2,806	31.85	
Labour	Bernard Martin	2,802	31.80	
Citizens	Paul Richardson	2,786	31.59	
Citizens	William Augustus Thompson	2,781	31.52	−0.13
Labour	James Aggers	2,771	31.39	
Labour	Peter Fraser Cooper	2,687	30.29	
Labour	Charles Arthur Watts	2,671	30.08	
Labour	John Douglas Robertson	2,519	28.08	
Labour	Jim Purtell	2,463	27.34	
Labour	James Frederick Derrick	2,452	27.20	
Labour	James Coswill	2,401	26.53	
Labour	Alfred Jackson	2,370	26.12	
Labour	George Thomas Jones	2,345	25.79	
Independent	Percy McElwain	2,296	25.15	−12.61
Independent	George William Murray	2,276	24.89	
Labour	Henry Buckler	2,248	24.52	
Independent	Arthur Rose	2,130	22.97	−17.90
Independent	Ernest George Lilly	2,063	22.09	
Independent	Thomas Buxton	1,927	20.30	
Labour	Arthur Rosser	1,830	19.03	
Independent	James Joiner	1,008	8.23	
Independent	John Jolly Thomas	836	5.97	
Independent	Robert Richmond	616	3.09	
