= 1907 Auckland City mayoral election =

New Zealand mayoral election

← 1906	24 April 1907	1908 →
- Turnout: 6,260 (39.19%)
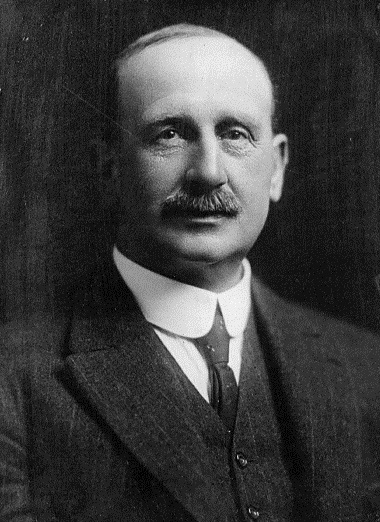

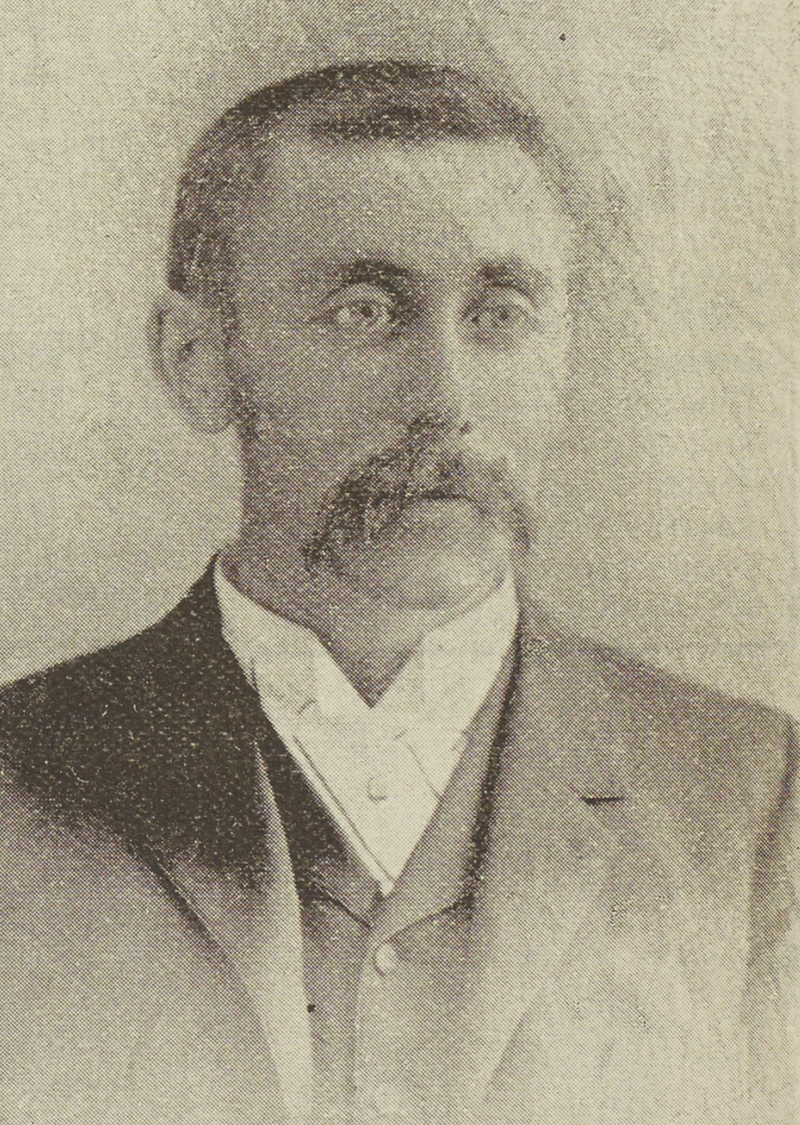

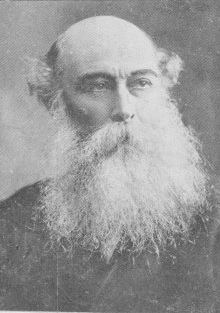
Candidate	Arthur Myers	Roland St. Clair	William Richardson
Party	Independent	Independent	Independent
Popular vote	4,568	930	673
Percentage	72.97	14.85	10.75
Mayor before election
Arthur Myers
Elected mayor
Arthur Myers

The 1907 Auckland City mayoral election was part of the New Zealand local elections held that same year. In 1907, elections were held for the Mayor of Auckland plus other local government positions including fifteen city councillors. The polling was conducted using the standard first-past-the-post electoral method.

== Background ==
Incumbent mayor Arthur Myers was re-elected with a huge majority over two challengers.

Three extra seats on the Auckland City Council were to be filled than at last municipal elections after the Council having by special order increased the membership from 12 to 15.

== Mayoralty results ==
1907 Auckland mayoral election
Party	Candidate	Votes	%	±%
Independent	Arthur Myers	4,568	72.97	−21.09
Independent	Roland William St. Clair	930	14.85	
Independent	William Richardson	673	10.75	
Informal votes		89	1.42	+0.77
Majority		3,638	58.11	−30.66
Turnout		6,260	39.19	+28.26

== Councillor results ==
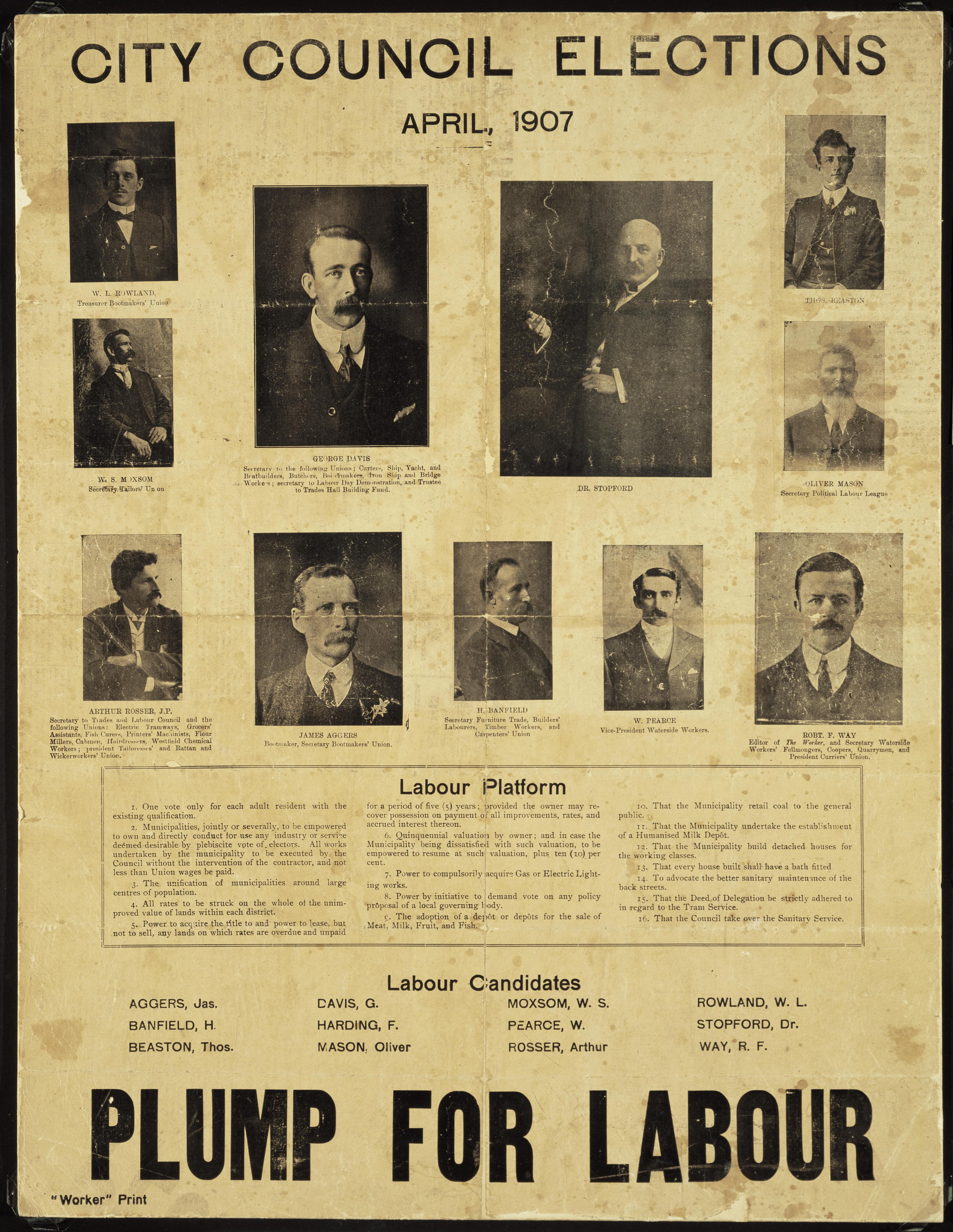
Advertisement of Labour candidates

1907 Auckland City Council election
Party	Candidate	Votes	%	±%
Progressive	Charles Grey	4,096	65.43	+2.18
Progressive	Andrew Entrican	3,928	62.74	+8.49
Progressive	Lemuel Bagnall	3,478	55.55	+3.59
Progressive	Albert Glover	3,391	54.16	+14.89
Progressive	James Parr	3,367	53.78	+3.86
Progressive	John Court	3,367	53.78	−1.91
Progressive	William Hutchinson	3,349	53.49	+6.51
Progressive	Robert Farrell	3,311	52.89	+11.79
Progressive	George Knight	3,294	52.61	+8.39
Progressive	Robert Tudehope	3,118	49.80	+9.83
Progressive	Peter Mitchell Mackay	2,971	47.46	
Progressive	Maurice Casey	2,966	47.38	−7.25
Ind. Labour League	Robert Stopford	2,913	46.53	
Progressive	Herbert Smeeton	2,907	46.43	+8.66
Independent	William Christopher Somers	2,475	39.53	
Progressive	John Patterson	2,152	34.37	+2.54
Independent	James Jamieson	2,129	34.00	+3.34
Progressive	Gerald Peacocke	1,943	31.03	
Independent	William Richardson	1,768	28.24	
Ind. Labour League	Arthur Rosser	1,704	27.22	
Independent	George Gregory	1,641	26.21	−2.07
Independent	Joseph Becroft	1,586	25.33	−4.19
Ind. Labour League	Bob Way	1,413	22.57	+8.93
Independent	Robert Thompson Graham	1,295	20.68	
Independent	John Henry Hannan	1,293	20.65	−4.46
Ind. Labour League	James Aggers	1,192	19.04	+2.67
Ind. Labour League	George Davis	1,167	18.64	
Ind. Labour League	Thomas Beaston	1,013	16.18	
Ind. Labour League	Henry Banfield	1,099	17.55	
Independent	Thomas Prosser	1,060	16.93	
Ind. Labour League	Frederick Thomas Harding	966	15.43	
Ind. Labour League	William Rowland	879	14.04	
Ind. Labour League	William Pearce	788	12.58	
