= 1909 Auckland City mayoral election =

New Zealand mayoral election

← 1908	24 April 1909	1910 →
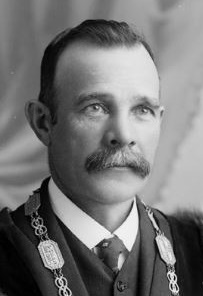
Candidate	Charles Grey
Party	Independent
Popular vote	Unopposed
Mayor before election
Charles Grey
Elected mayor
Charles Grey

The 1909 Auckland City mayoral election was part of the New Zealand local elections held that same year. In 1909, elections were held for the Mayor of Auckland plus other local government positions including fifteen city councillors. The polling was conducted using the standard first-past-the-post electoral method.

== Background ==
Incumbent mayor Charles Grey re-elected unopposed. Grey had been elected by the council to fill the vacancy for the mayoralty remainder of the previous term following the resignation of Arthur Myers.

== Councillor results ==
1909 Auckland local election
Party	Candidate	Votes	%	±%
Citizens	Andrew Entrican	3,245	70.10	+7.36
Citizens	Lemuel Bagnall	3,212	69.38	+13.83
Citizens	James Parr	3,206	69.25	+15.47
Citizens	James Mennie	3,156	68.17	
Citizens	Peter Mitchell Mackay	3,140	67.83	+20.37
Citizens	Robert Tudehope	3,088	66.70	
Independent	Maurice Casey	3,059	66.08	+18.70
Independent	George Knight	2,989	64.57	+11.96
Citizens	George Tutt	2,642	57.07	
Citizens	Patrick Nerheny	2,609	56.36	
Citizens	Herbert Smeeton	2,597	56.10	+9.67
Independent	George Read	2,570	55.51	
Citizens	John Patterson	2,538	54.82	+20.45
Citizens	William Thompson	2,210	47.74	
Citizens	Moncrieff Murray McCallum	2,185	47.20	
Citizens	Henry Shaw	2,181	47.11	
Citizens	Frederick Gaudin	2,173	46.94	
Independent	Ralph Thomas Michaels	1,862	40.22	
Citizens	John Francis Pullen	1,611	34.80	
Ind. Labour League	George Davis	1,440	31.10	+12.46
Ind. Labour League	Thomas Long	1,028	22.20	
Independent	Daniel Finnane	816	17.62	
Independent	William Black	743	16.05	
