= 1905 Auckland City mayoral election =

New Zealand mayoral election

← 1904	26 April 1905	1906 →
- Turnout: 9,449 (60.03%)
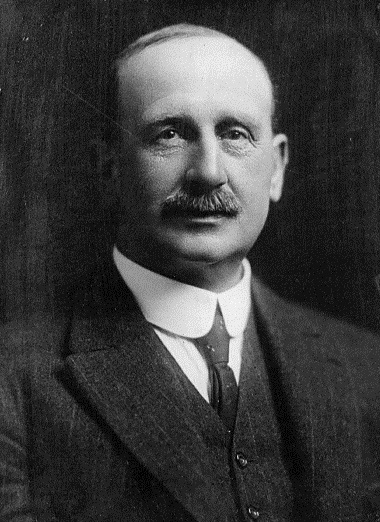

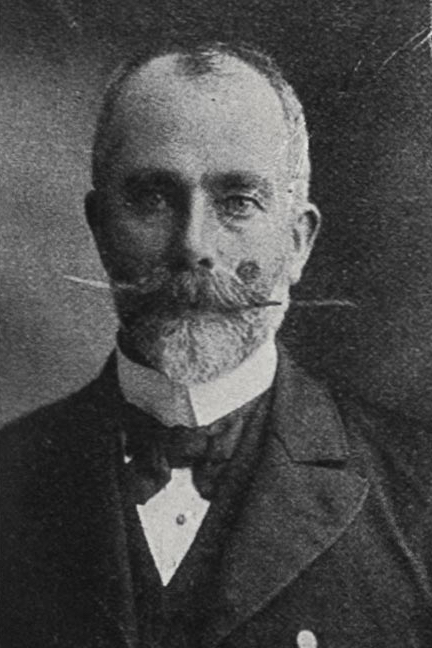
Candidate	Arthur Myers	John McLeod
Party	Independent	Independent
Popular vote	5,193	3,541
Percentage	54.95	37.47
Mayor before election
Edwin Mitchelson
Elected mayor
Arthur Myers

The 1905 Auckland City mayoral election was part of the New Zealand local elections held that same year. In 1905, elections were held for the Mayor of Auckland. The polling was conducted using the standard first-past-the-post electoral method.

== Background ==
Incumbent mayor Edwin Mitchelson decided to retire and not seek re-election. Arthur Myers was elected as Auckland's new mayor.

== Mayoralty results ==
1905 Auckland mayoral election
Party	Candidate	Votes	%	±%
Independent	Arthur Myers	5,193	54.95	
Independent	John McLeod	3,541	37.47	
Independent	John Thomas Julian	627	6.63	
Informal votes		88	0.93	
Majority		1,652	17.48	
Turnout		9,449	60.03	

== Councillor results ==
1905 Auckland City Council election
Party	Candidate	Votes	%	±%
Independent	Charles Grey	5,977	63.25	
Independent	John Court	5,263	55.69	
Independent	Maurice Casey	5,162	54.63	
Independent	Andrew Entrican	5,127	54.25	
Independent	Lemuel Bagnall	4,910	51.96	
Independent	James Parr	4,717	49.92	
Independent	William Hutchinson	4,440	46.98	
Independent	George Knight	4,179	44.22	
Independent	Robert Farrell	3,884	41.10	
Independent	Robert Tudehope	3,777	39.97	
Independent	Albert Glover	3,711	39.27	
Independent	Herbert Smeeton	3,569	37.77	
Independent	John Patterson	3,008	31.83	
Independent	James Jamieson	2,898	30.66	
Independent	Joseph Becroft	2,790	29.52	
Independent	George Gregory	2,673	28.28	
Independent	John Henry Hannan	2,373	25.11	
Independent	James Regan	1,776	18.79	
Independent	Roland St. Clair	1,583	16.75	
Ind. Labour League	James Aggers	1,547	16.37	
Ind. Labour League	Percy George Andrew	1,374	14.54	
Ind. Labour League	Bob Way	1,289	13.64	
Independent	Samuel Alexander Tilly	1,272	13.46	
Independent	Edgar Edwin Partington	980	10.37	
