= 1917 Auckland City mayoral election =

New Zealand local elections,1917

- 30 April 1917
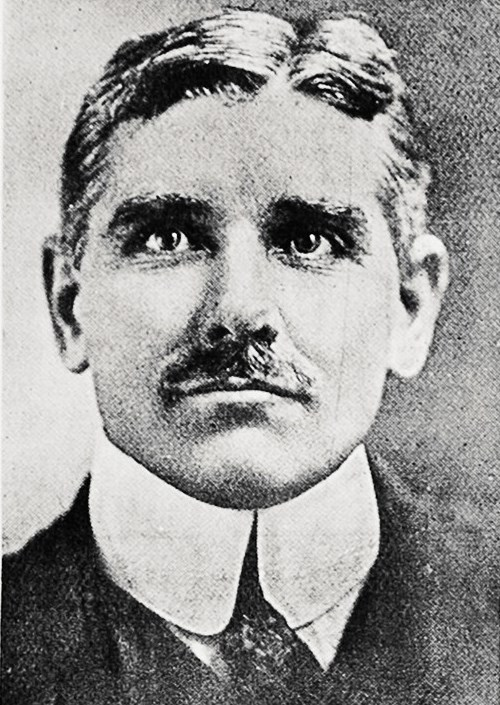
Candidate	James Gunson
Party	Citizens
Popular vote	unopposed
Mayor before election
James Gunson
Elected mayor
James Gunson

The 1917 Auckland City mayoral election was part of the New Zealand local elections held that same year. In 1917, elections were held for the Mayor of Auckland plus other local government positions including twenty-one city councillors. The polling was conducted using the standard first-past-the-post electoral method.

Incumbent mayor James Gunson was declared re-elected unopposed, with no other candidates emerging.

== Councillor results ==
1917 Auckland City Council election
Party	Candidate	Votes	%	±%
Citizens	Andrew Entrican	5,369	72.11	+9.69
Citizens	Patrick Nerheny	4,653	61.83	+11.05
Citizens	Ellen Melville	4,649	61.77	+9.01
Citizens	Harold D. Heather	4,408	58.31	+13.17
Citizens	William Holdsworth	4,331	57.20	+15.04
Citizens	George Knight	4,240	55.90	+5.58
Citizens	George Baildon	4,185	55.11	+9.57
Citizens	James Alexander Warnock	4,057	53.27	+8.07
Independent	Ernest Davis	4,056	53.25	+7.59
Citizens	Frederick Brinsden	4,026	52.82	+17.58
Citizens	Peter Mitchell Mackay	3,937	51.54	+5.27
Citizens	Edwin James Carr	3,930	51.44	+13.42
Citizens	Maurice Casey	3,834	50.07	−0.66
Citizens	Horatio Bagnall	3,819	49.85	+1.48
Citizens	James Francis Hosking	3,739	48.70	
Citizens	Alfred Hall-Skelton	3,693	48.04	+8.41
Citizens	Jonathan Trevethick	3,525	45.63	+3.90
Citizens	John Burton	3,413	44.02	+7.17
Citizens	John Barr Paterson	3,360	43.26	
Citizens	John Dempsey	3,267	41.92	+3.04
Citizens	Sydney Moore-Jones	3,261	41.83	+8.12
Independent	George William Murray (Note: Murray and Emily Maguire were appointed to fill vacancies on the council in 1918 caused by the deaths of Maurice Casey and Sydney Moore-Jones)	3,258	41.79	
Independent	William Donald	3,219	41.23	+9.26
Independent	Arthur Rose	3,194	40.87	+13.26
Independent	Percy McElwain	2,977	37.76	
Citizens	William Augustus Thompson	2,552	31.65	
Independent Labour	Wesley Richards	2,524	31.25	+9.84
Independent	William Richardson	2,490	30.76	+4.55
Independent	Arthur Herrold	2,307	28.13	
Independent	Richard Singer	1,972	23.32	

Table footnotes:
