= 1921 Auckland City mayoral election =

New Zealand mayoral election

- 4 May 1921
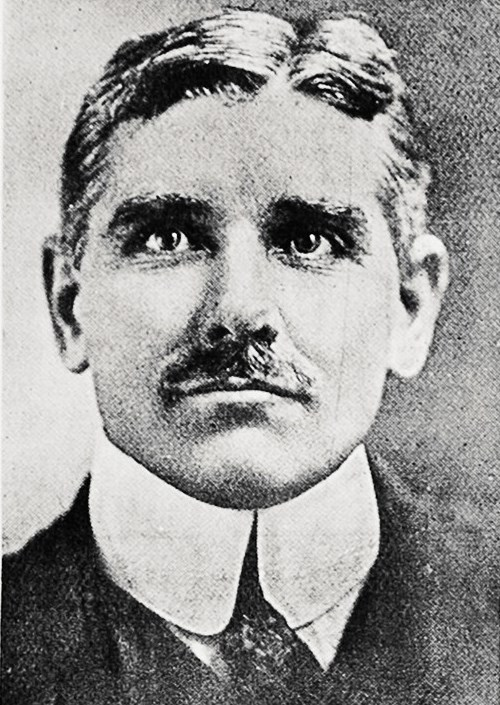
Candidate	James Gunson
Party	Progressive Citizens'
Popular vote	unopposed
Mayor before election
James Gunson
Elected mayor
James Gunson

The 1921 Auckland City mayoral election was part of the New Zealand local elections held that same year. In 1921, elections were held for the Mayor of Auckland plus other local government positions including twenty-one city councillors. The polling was conducted using the standard first-past-the-post electoral method.

Incumbent mayor James Gunson was again declared re-elected unopposed, with no other candidates emerging.

== Councillor results ==
1921 Auckland City Council election
Party	Candidate	Votes	%	±%
Progressive Citizens'	George R. Hutchison	9,707	73.36	
Progressive Citizens'	Ellen Melville	8,836	66.78	+3.36
Progressive Citizens'	John Allum	8,808	66.57	
Progressive Citizens'	James Alexander Warnock	8,726	65.95	+11.10
Progressive Citizens'	William John Holdsworth	8,717	65.88	+7.74
Progressive Citizens'	George Knight	8,351	63.11	+7.29
Progressive Citizens'	John William Hardley	8,250	62.35	
Progressive Citizens'	Ernest Davis	8,107	61.27	+3.84
Progressive Citizens'	Emily Maguire	8,104	61.25	+4.79
Progressive Citizens'	Peter Mitchell Mackay	8,005	60.50	+7.98
Progressive Citizens'	Matthew John Bennett	8,002	60.47	
Progressive Citizens'	George Baildon	7,827	59.15	+9.14
Progressive Citizens'	John Dempsey	7,770	58.72	+9.44
Progressive Citizens'	Harold Dennett Heather	7,646	57.78	−1.52
Progressive Citizens'	John Barr Paterson	7,638	57.72	+8.82
Independent	Horatio Bagnall	7,287	55.07	−1.40
Progressive Citizens'	James Robertson	7,192	54.35	
Labour	Tom Bloodworth	6,640	50.18	−7.83
Independent	Frederick Brinsden	6,366	48.11	−7.33
Labour	Michael Joseph Savage	6,349	47.98	−3.99
Progressive Citizens'	Patrick Nerheny	6,183	46.73	−8.04
Progressive Citizens'	Eric Inder	6,059	45.79	
Progressive Citizens'	Alfred Hall-Skelton	6,020	45.49	−2.66
Independent	Arthur Sexton	5,559	42.01	
Labour	George Davis	5,276	39.87	−4.78
Progressive Citizens'	Michael John Coyle	5,271	39.83	
Independent	George Foster	4,915	37.14	
Independent	William Hugh McKinney	4,606	34.81	
Labour	Ted Phelan	4,536	34.28	−3.73
Independent	William Lang Casey	4,234	32.00	
Labour	Patrick Barry	4,219	31.88	
Independent	Samuel Turkington	4,147	31.34	
Labour	Arthur Rose	4,140	31.29	+8.32
Labour	Oscar McBrine	4,056	30.65	−4.38
Labour	James Aggers	3,823	28.89	−2.50
Labour	Bob Way	3,573	27.00	−8.28
Labour	Dick Barter	3,559	26.89	
Labour	Charles Arthur Watts	3,434	25.95	−4.13
Labour	Jim Purtell	3,423	25.87	+1.47
Labour	David Wilson	3,408	25.75	
Labour	Giles Pardington	3,349	25.31	
Labour	Bernard Martin	3,262	24.65	−7.15
Independent	Harold Percy Burton	3,174	23.98	
Labour	James Frederick Derrick	3,144	23.76	−3.44
Labour	Bernard Clews	3,132	23.67	
Labour	George Tomlinson	3,076	23.24	
Labour	William Kendall	3,036	22.94	
Labour	William Moxsom	3,036	22.94	−8.91
Labour	Allen Proctor	2,875	21.72	
Independent	James Joiner	1,018	7.69	−0.54
