= Edger (surname) =

Edger is a surname. Notable people with the surname include:

- Henry Edger (1820–1888), English positivist
- Joseph Frost Edger, British merchant in China and Hong Kong
- Kate Edger (1857–1935), first woman in New Zealand to gain a university degree
- Samuel Edger (c.1823–1882), New Zealand minister
