= 1908 Auckland City mayoral election =

New Zealand mayoral election

← 1907	29 April 1908	1909 →
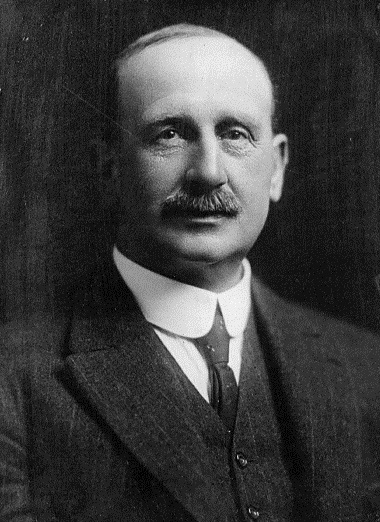
Candidate	Arthur Myers
Party	Independent
Popular vote	Unopposed
Mayor before election
Arthur Myers
Elected mayor
Arthur Myers

The 1908 Auckland City mayoral election was part of the New Zealand local elections held that same year. In 1908, elections were held for the Mayor of Auckland.

== Background ==
Incumbent mayor Arthur Myers re-elected unopposed for a then record fourth consecutive term. Myers did not serve out his full term and resigned the mayoralty in March 1909. Councillor Charles Grey was elected by the council to fill the vacancy for the remainder of the term. The mayoral contest coincided with a vacancy on the Auckland City Council following the resignation of councillor Robert Stopford triggering a by-election. Six candidates contested the seat which was ultimately won by John Patterson, a local businessman.

== Council by-election ==
1908 Auckland City Council by-election
Party	Candidate	Votes	%	±%
Citizens	John Patterson	1,461	40.78	+6.41
Independent	George Read	966	26.96	
Independent	George Gregory	612	17.08	+0.75
Independent	Samuel White	242	6.75	
Ind. Labour League	William Rowland	217	6.05	−7.29
Independent	Rupert Mantell	40	1.11	
Informal votes		44	1.22	
Majority		495	13.81	
Turnout		3,582	17.90	−21.20
