= 1910 Auckland City mayoral election =

New Zealand mayoral election

← 1909	28 April 1910	1911 →
- Turnout: 6,133 (31.83%)
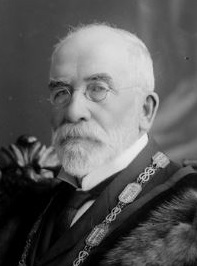

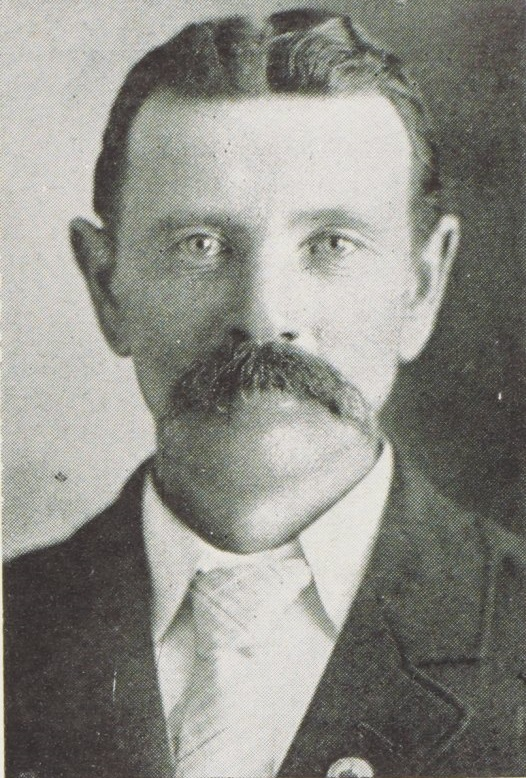
Candidate	Lemuel Bagnall	Patrick Nerheny
Party	Independent	Independent
Popular vote	3,627	1,992
Percentage	59.13	32.48
Mayor before election
Charles Grey
Elected mayor
Lemuel Bagnall

The 1910 Auckland City mayoral election was part of the New Zealand local elections held that same year. In 1910, elections were held for the Mayor of Auckland. The polling was conducted using the standard first-past-the-post electoral method.

== Background ==
Incumbent mayor Charles Grey did not seek re-election and was replaced by Councillor Lemuel Bagnall who defeated Patrick Nerheny and William Richardson. Consequently, a by-election to fill Bagnall's vacated seat was held, which was won by Henry Shaw.

Due to Bagnall's win at the polls for mayor his seat on the city council had been declared vacant. A by-election was held to fill the vacancy the next month which was won by Henry Shaw. William Richardson, who was defeated for the mayoralty also stood for the council seat and was again unsuccessful.

== Mayoralty results ==
1910 Auckland mayoral election
Party	Candidate	Votes	%	±%
Independent	Lemuel Bagnall	3,627	59.13	
Independent	Patrick Nerheny	1,992	32.48	
Independent	William Richardson	455	7.41	
Informal votes		59	0.96	
Majority		1,635	26.65	
Turnout		6,133	31.83	

== Council by-election ==
1910 Auckland City Council by-election
Party	Candidate	Votes	%	±%
Citizens	Henry Shaw	1,662	54.94	+7.83
Independent	Ernest William Burton	828	27.37	
Independent	William Richardson	318	10.51	
Independent	Thomas Harkins	201	6.64	
Informal votes		16	0.52	
Majority		834	27.57	
Turnout		3,025		
