= Rosetta Baume =

New Zealand teacher and community leader (1871–1934)

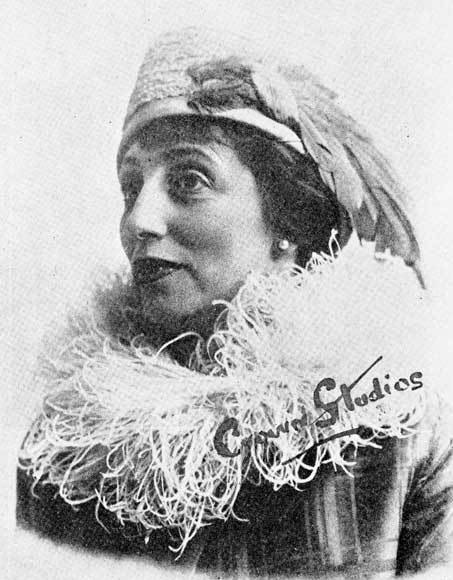
- Baume in 1919
- Born: Rosetta Lulah Leavy; July 1871; San Francisco, United States
- Died: 22 February 1934 (aged 62); Wellington, New Zealand
- Other name: Rosetta Kane
- Occupations: Teacher; community leader
- Known for: Women's rights advocacy
- Spouses: Frederick Baume (m. 1899; died 1910) Edward William Kane (m. 1921–1934)
- Children: 4

Rosetta Lulah Baume (née Leavy, also known as Rosetta Kane; July 1871 – 22 February 1934) was an American-born New Zealand teacher, feminist and community leader. She sat on a number of educational boards and in 1919 was one of the first three female candidates for Parliament in New Zealand.

== Early life and family ==
Baume was born in San Francisco, California, United States, in July 1871. Her father was a civil service commissioner for the state of California. She earned a Bachelor of Philosophy from the University of California in 1891, and became one of the first female high school teachers in the United States. On 21 June 1899 she married Frederick Baume, a barrister from New Zealand, in San Francisco. They moved to New Zealand shortly after their marriage where Frederick became a Member of Parliament for the Liberal Party. Baume found New Zealand life "provincial" and stood out for being an American university-educated woman. She and her husband had four sons together, one of whom died at 8 months old.

== Community and political work ==
Baume's husband died in Germany in 1910, and the family were left in difficult financial circumstances. She returned to San Francisco with her sons from 1911 to 1913, then returned to New Zealand where she became involved in educational and community work. She was the first woman to be appointed to the Auckland Education Board and the Auckland Grammar School Board, and also sat on the boards of the Elam School of Art and the Auckland Technical School, as well as being a member of various other women's, children's and educational associations. She was the first honorary secretary of the Auckland Women's Patriotic League and a founder and committee member of the Auckland Women's Club. From 1918 to 1920 she was a vice-president of the revived National Council of Women of New Zealand.

In 1913, together with Ellen Melville and Emily Maguire, she helped found the Auckland Civic League, a women's organisation which aimed to encourage women to run for public office. Baume became one of the first three women candidates for Parliament in New Zealand (alongside Melville and Aileen Cooke), standing for the Liberal Party for the seat of Parnell in 1919. All three women were unsuccessful, with Baume coming third in her electorate, and a political cartoon at the time showed two women standing outside a house labelled "Woman's Kingdom", with Baume saying to Melville: "After all, dear, there's no place like home for a woman. We can always get elected to this house without opposition."

== Later years and death ==
In 1921 she remarried Edward William Kane, a clerk of the House of Representatives. Her new home in Wellington became a venue for politicians and other leading members of society to gather. She joined the board of governors of Wellington College and Wellington Girls' College, and rose to the position of vice-chair. She became a member of the Wellington branch of the League of Nations Union of New Zealand and the Women's Service Guild, and was a founding member and committee member of the Wellington Women's Club. In 1931 she became a justice of the peace, and stated her intention of standing for Parliament again in the next election.

In February 1926, the family experienced a scandal when one of Baume's sons, Sidney Baume, aged 20, was convicted of cheque fraud against the Wellington Post Office and sentenced to up to three years' imprisonment in a Borstal institute. He was released in October 1926 on the condition that he move to Sydney and not return to Wellington; Baume escorted him on the ship to Sydney.

Baume died in Wellington on 22 February 1934. Her funeral was attended by the Prime Minister, George Forbes, the Chief Justice and many other leading political figures. Her second husband died a few months later in July 1934. One of her sons from her first marriage, Eric Baume, later became well known in Australia as a journalist, broadcaster and novelist. Her son Sidney Baume, after his move to Australia, became a radio station manager and later an advertising agent. Sidney's son Peter Baume, and another grandson Michael Baume, became Australian senators.
