= Mary Martin (netball) =

New Zealand netball player

Personal information
- Born: 7 January 1915
- Died: 6 September 1988 (aged 73)
- Relative: Bernard Martin (father)
- University: Auckland Teachers' Training College

Netball career
- Playing positions: C, WA
Years	National team	Caps
1938	New Zealand	1

Mary Martin (7 January 1915 – 6 September 1988) was a New Zealand netball player. She represented New Zealand in their first Test match, in 1938 against Australia.

== Early life ==
Born on 7 January 1915, Martin was the daughter of trade unionist and later politician Bernard Martin and Minnie Ellen Martin (née Fitzgerald). She studied at Auckland Teachers' Training College, and served on the Auckland University Students' Association social committee, the Dramatic Club committee, and as secretary of the Basketball Club. She was awarded a New Zealand Universities blue for netball (at that time called basketball).

== Netball career ==
=== Domestic ===
Martin played representative netball for Auckland, and playing as a centre at the 1936 and 1937 national championships her performances were reported to have been "particularly strong".

=== International ===
In 1936, Martin was first selected to tour Australia with a New Zealand national team the following season, but the tour did not proceed. In 1938, Martin was a member of the first New Zealand netball team, when a national side travelled to Australia and competed in the Australian interstate tournament in Melbourne. At times, the New Zealand team struggled as the matches were played on grass courts under Australian rules, which differed from those used in New Zealand at the time, but they defeated Queensland 13–9, before losing to Victoria 16–48 However, in an exhibition match played under New Zealand rules, the New Zealand team beat Victoria 19–5. In New Zealand's remaining matches of the tournament, they were defeated by South Australia 14–47 and Tasmania 17–32, before overcoming New South Wales 21–18. Martin played in all the matches except the defeat by Tasmania.

Martin appeared in the single Test match, the first played between New Zealand and Australia, in Melbourne on 20 August 1938. New Zealand were defeated 11–40 in the match, played under Australian rules.

== Later life and death ==
Martin died on 6 September 1988 and her ashes were buried with her parents at Waikumete Cemetery in West Auckland.
