= Ellen Elizabeth Ellis =

NZ feminist and writer

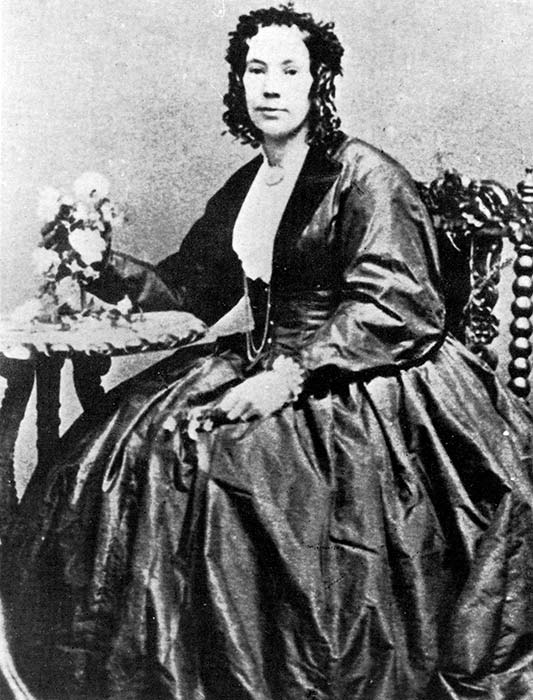
- Born: Ellen Elizabeth Colebrook; 14 March 1829; Guildford, England
- Died: 17 April 1895 (aged 66); Auckland, New Zealand
- Resting place: Symonds Street Cemetery
- Spouse: Oliver Sidney Ellis (m. 1852; died 1883)
- Children: John William Ellis
- Writing career
- Genre: Feminist
- Notable work: Everything is Possible to Will (1882)

Ellen Elizabeth Ellis (née Colebrook; 14 March 1829 – 17 April 1895) was a New Zealand feminist and writer. She was born in England and moved to New Zealand in 1859.

== Early life ==
Ellen Elizabeth Colebrook was baptised on 3 May 1829 at Holy Trinity Church, the second of seventeen children (nine girls and eight boys) of Mary Ann May and William Colebrook, who was a butcher. The family lived at 106 High Street, Guildford, and the household also included six young nephews and nieces, taken in after they were orphaned in a cholera epidemic in London. The family were fervent Methodists.

Ellis went to school with her three older sisters, Sarah, Emily, and Elizabeth, but was expelled when she was 13. In her 1882 book 'Everything is Possible to Will', published by Annie Besant and Charles Bradlaugh's Freethought Publishing, she noted how few teachers can tell apart the child who "can learn but will not", and the child "who would learn but cannot".

In 1847, Ellis (aged 16) and her three older sisters (aged 17, 18 and 19) opened a school, for children aged 4 to 13, next to the Royal Grammar School. The 1851 census listed Ellis as the milliner, her older sister Sarah the schoolmistress, and Emily and Elizabeth as governesses. In 1852 the family moved to Great Tangley Manor, with Ellis' father William as tenant farmer. Ellis remembered the "home in the woods", in her book calling it the "large rambling antiquated place...suggestive of ghosts and goblins".

Under family pressure, she married Oliver Sidney Ellis on 21 September 1852. He had boarded at 105 High Street, whilst an apprentice builder. He had been born in 1828 to John Ellis and Rebecca Nash, the youngest of 13, and was a strict Calvinist-Methodist.

== Emigration ==
Ellis and her husband had three sons: John William (1853–1918), Sidney Alexander (1856–1857) and Sidney Thomas (1858–1864). On 31 March 1859, Ellis, her husband and her two surviving sons, together with her 19-year-old brother, Tom Colebrook, and her 18-year-old cousin, John Drew Colebrook, sailed to New Zealand. They had been told that their youngest son's health might improve in a warmer climate. Her husband preferred India, but she was concerned at reports of uprisings. They arrived in Auckland on 16 July 1859. They were poor during their first few years in Auckland. She went to Governor Thomas Gore Browne's peace conference at Kohimarama in 1860 and wrote in support of Māori interests. She encouraged her sons to learn Māori and play with Māori children, so that John became an interpreter, then a teacher. Her husband disapproved of her opinions on Māori and the role of women, while she disapproved of his drinking and control over the family finances.

With the outbreak of further war in 1863, Ellis and her two sons sailed on the Ida Zieglar, a ship regularly voyaging between Auckland and London, in January 1864, but on 8 March her 6-year-old son drowned when he slipped through the ship's railings, despite attempts to save him. Whilst in England, her brother-in-law, James Ellis, encouraged her to express her opinions by writing a pamphlet on the unfair treatment of women. At her husband's request, she returned to New Zealand in February 1865, leaving John at a boarding-school. Her husband was facing the possibility of bankruptcy, and she assisted him in avoiding his creditors.

== Campaigning ==
After returning she attended the non-denominational church services of Reverend Samuel Edger and he encouraged her writing and self-education. By 1869 she was campaigning against the Contagious Diseases Act and raised an 1,100-signature petition. The City Council of Auckland refused her petition on the grounds that "the subject is one which it is undesirable to explain in all its disgusting details to the public". In June 1871 Rev. Edger wrote: "it is one of woman’s rights...that she should enjoy an education as thorough in quality as that which is thought necessary for men". In May 1882 Ellis gave a long speech at his leaving ceremony.

In 1882 she wrote her novel, Everything is Possible to Will, which was published in London. Although the novel was advertised as a temperance novel, it also called for equality for women, fair rights for Māori, for birth control through abstinence, to ban the corset, for unsectarian Christianity and to teach the Māori language in schools. It was not widely read as her son, businessman John William Ellis, considered his late father to be an occasional drinker, rather than a drunkard, and burnt all the copies of the novel he could find.

Ellen died of bronchitis on 17 April 1895 at Ponsonby Rd, Auckland.

== Additional resources ==
- Coleman, Jenny (2008). "Apprehending possiblities: Tracing the emergence of feminist consciousness in nineteenth-century New Zealand". Women's Studies International Forum. 31 (6): 464–473. doi:10.1016/j.wsif.2008.09.008.
- Ellis, Ellen E. (1882). Everything is possible to will. London: E. W. Whittle, 170 St John Street, Clerkenwell, E.C.
