= Thomas Otto Bishop =

New Zealand politician

The Honourable Thomas Otto Bishop
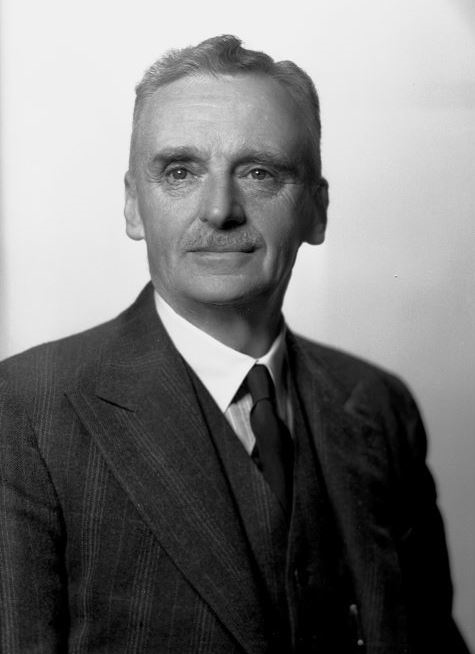

18th Speaker of the Legislative Council
- In office 15 March 1950 – 31 December 1950
- Preceded by: Bernard Martin
- Succeeded by: Position abolished

Personal details
- Born: 1878 Mansfield, England
- Died: 1 May 1952 (aged 73–74) Lower Hutt, New Zealand
- Party: National
- Spouse: Dorcas Louise Griffiths (m. 1902)
- Children: 3

Thomas Otto Bishop (1878 – 1 May 1952) was a New Zealand politician of the National Party.

== Biography ==
Bishop was born in Mansfield, England, in 1878. He moved to New Zealand from Nottingham at age six, first settling in Dunedin. There he studied mining at the University of Otago and subsequently became an associate of the Otago School of Mines. He then worked in the civil service for 10 years before being appointed the acting-Under-Secretary of Mines in 1918. In 1919 he left the civil service to become secretary of the New Zealand Coal Mine Owners' Association, remaining in this position until 1940. Between 1922 and 1947 he was the secretary of the New Zealand Employers' Federation. In 1928 he was a delegate to the National Industrial Conference and in 1935 he went to the International Labour Conference in Geneva. During the Second World War Bishop was chairman of the Industrial Emergency Council from 1940 to 1945 and on the Coal Mines Council from 1940 to 1944.

He was appointed to the New Zealand Legislative Council in 1943, and was Speaker from 15 March 1950 until it was abolished on 31 December 1950 by the First National Government. He was a member of several Royal Commissions.

Bishop was married with three daughters, and died at his home in Lower Hutt on 1 May 1952, aged 75 years. He was cremated at Karori Crematorium the following day. His wife Dorcas died eight days after him at Hutt Hospital.

Political offices
Preceded by Bernard Martin	Speaker of the Legislative Council; 1950	Position abolished
