= 1906 Auckland City mayoral election =

Local election in New Zealand

← 1905	25 April 1906	1907 →
- Turnout: 1,684 (10.93%)
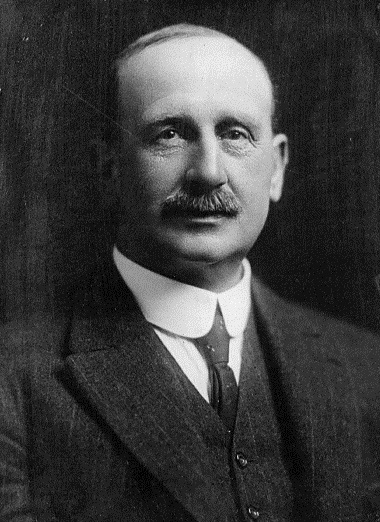

Candidate	Arthur Myers	Albert Bradley
Party	Independent	Independent
Popular vote	1,584	89
Percentage	94.06	5.29
Mayor before election
Arthur Myers
Elected mayor
Arthur Myers

The 1906 Auckland City mayoral election was part of the New Zealand local elections held that same year. In 1906, elections were held for the Mayor of Auckland. The polling was conducted using the standard first-past-the-post electoral method.

== Background ==
Incumbent mayor Arthur Myers was overwhelmingly re-elected against challenger Albert Bradley. The contest was marked by little interest with the result being regarded as a foregone conclusion. Consequently there was a low turnout.

== Mayoralty results ==
1906 Auckland mayoral election
Party	Candidate	Votes	%	±%
Independent	Arthur Myers	1,584	94.06	+39.11
Independent	Albert Bradley	89	5.29	
Informal votes		11	0.65	−0.28
Majority		1,495	88.77	+71.29
Turnout		1,684	10.93	−49.10
