= Samuel Edger =

Samuel Edger (c.1823–1882) was a New Zealand non-denominational minister, writer, social reformer and community worker. He was born in East Grinstead, Sussex, England on c.1823. His daughter was Kate Edger.

Edger came to New Zealand as chaplain for the Non-Conformist Albertland settlement scheme in 1862. The harsh conditions led to him abandoning it and moving to Auckland. New Zealand churches were more theologically conservative than those in England and Edger decided to found his own non-denominational liberal church on Lorne Street.

In June 1871 he wrote: “it is one of woman’s rights...that she should enjoy an education as thorough in quality as that which is thought necessary for men." He was one of those who inspired feminist writer, Ellen Elizabeth Ellis.
