= 1912 Auckland City mayoral election =

New Zealand mayoral election

- 25 April 1912
- Turnout: 13,636 (51.59%)
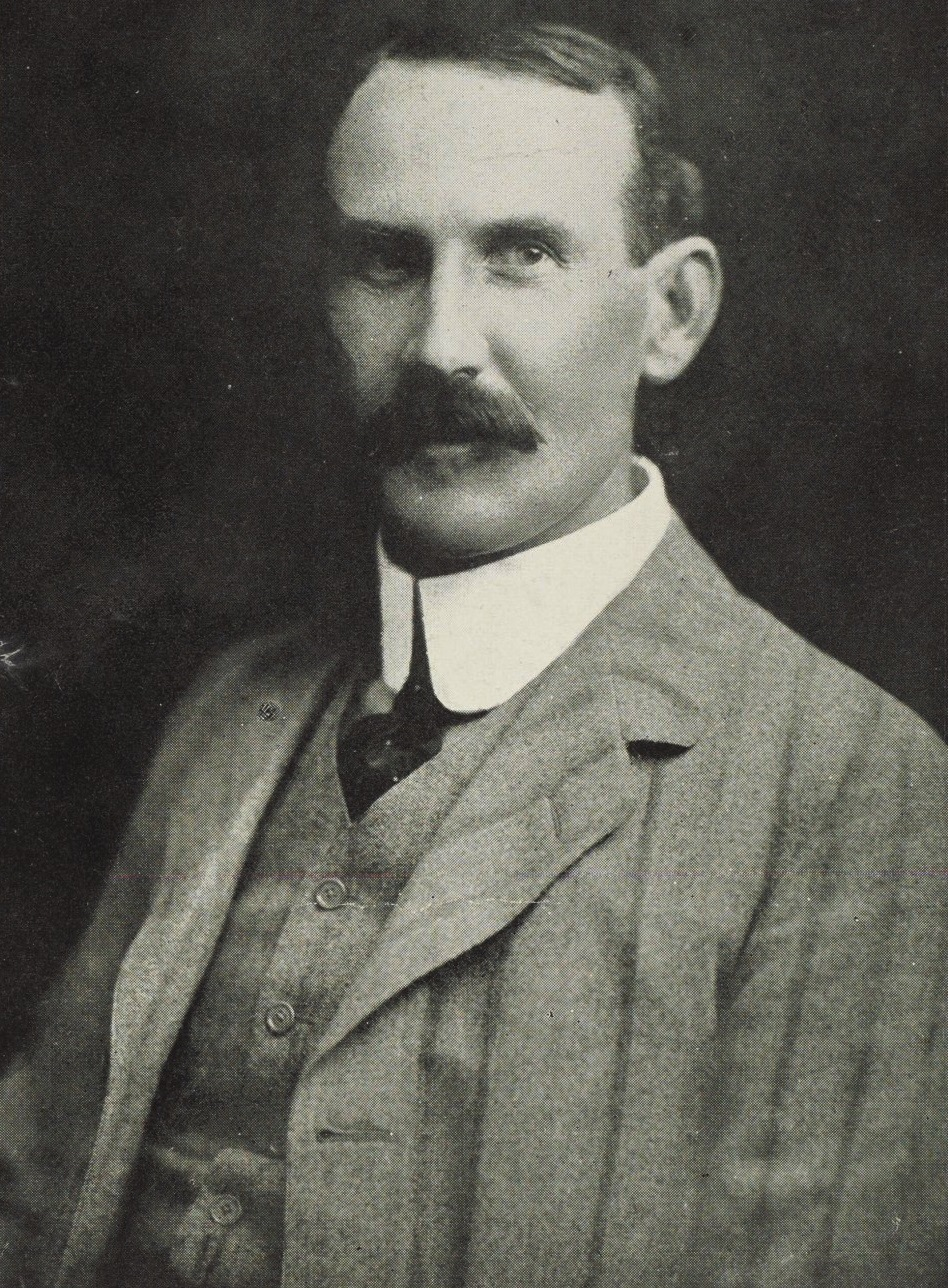

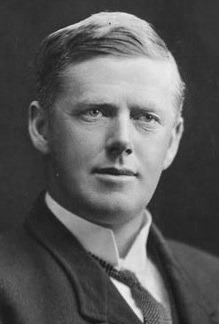
Candidate	James Parr	Alfred Hall-Skelton
Party	Independent	Independent
Popular vote	10,093	3,543
Percentage	74.01	25.99
Mayor before election
James Parr
Elected mayor
James Parr

The 1912 Auckland City mayoral election was part of the New Zealand local elections held that same year. In 1912, elections were held for the Mayor of Auckland. The polling was conducted using the standard first-past-the-post electoral method.

== Background ==
The mayoral contest was viewed with great interest as it followed a recent industrial dispute. Sitting mayor James Parr was challenged by Alfred Hall-Skelton, who had the endorsement of the Federation of Labour. Parr claimed not to be an opponent of Labour but was against "revolutionary agitators".

== Mayoralty results ==
1912 Auckland mayoral election
Party	Candidate	Votes	%	±%
Independent	James Parr	10,093	74.01	
Independent	Alfred Hall-Skelton	3,543	25.99	
Majority		6,550	48.03	
Turnout		13,636	51.59	
