= Kate Edger =

Early New Zealand university graduate

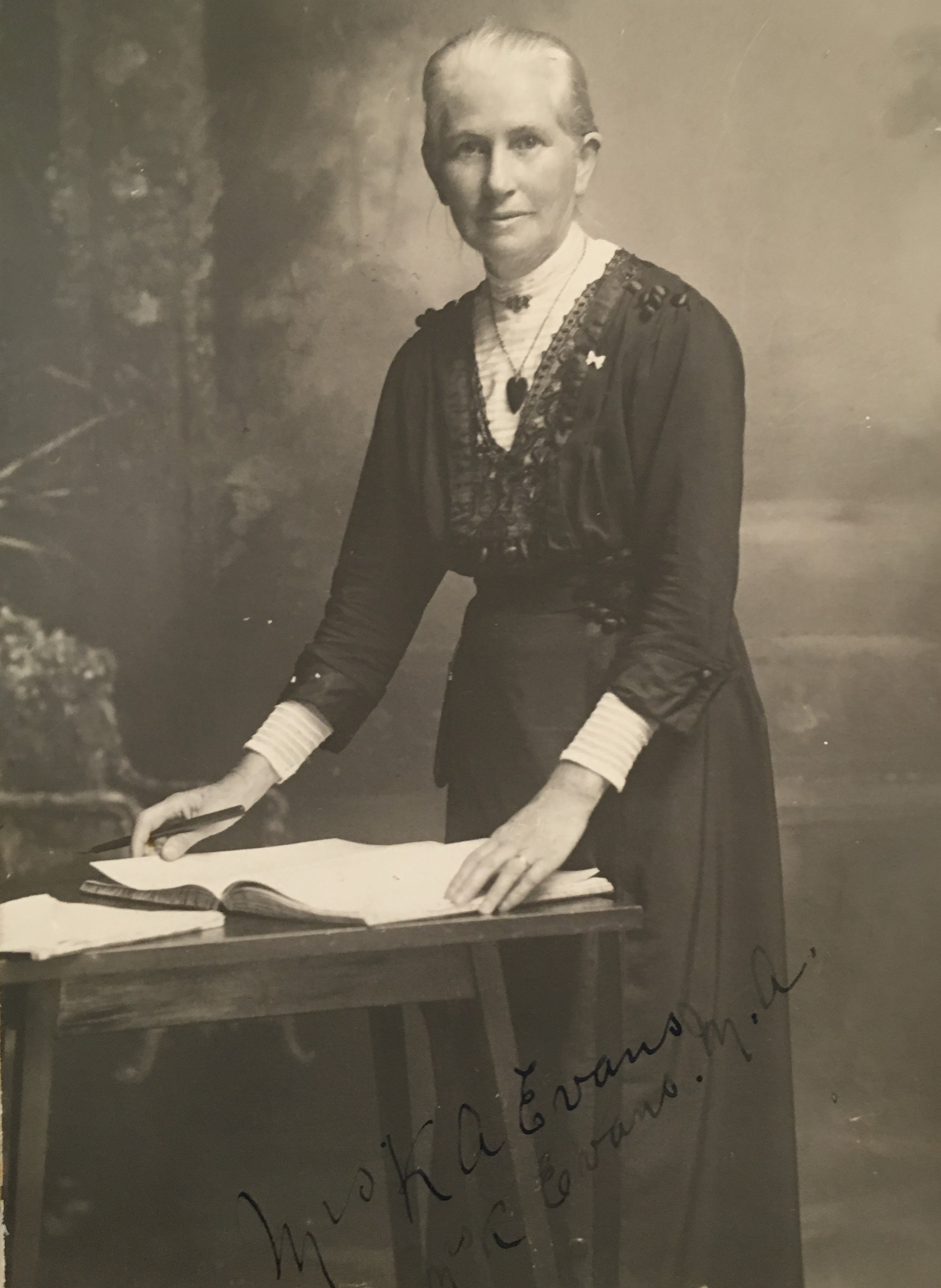
- Born: Kate Milligan Edger; 6 January 1857; Abingdon-on-Thames
- Died: 6 May 1935 (aged 78); Dunedin
- Education: Auckland College and Grammar School
- Occupations: Headmistress; educator
- Employer: Nelson College for Girls
- Known for: first NZ woman university graduate; temperance and world peace activist
- Spouse: William Albert Evans
- Children: 3
- Parent(s): Louisa Harwood and the Reverend Samuel Edger
- Relatives: Geraldine Hemus (niece)

Kate Milligan Evans (née Edger, 6 January 1857 – 6 May 1935) was the first woman in New Zealand to gain a university degree, and possibly the second in the British Empire to do so.

== Early life ==
Edger was born in 1857 at Abingdon, Berkshire, England. Her father was the Rev. Samuel Edger, a Christian minister. Her family emigrated from England to New Zealand in 1862. They lived in Albertland and then in Auckland.

== Education ==
Edger and her sisters received much of their early education from their father who was a university graduate. There was no higher education for girls at the time, but as she showed academic promise, she was placed in the top class of Auckland College and Grammar School. When Edger applied to the senate of the University of New Zealand for permission to sit for a university scholarship she did not state her gender and her application was successful. She was the only female in classes at Auckland College and Grammar School, which was affiliated to the University of New Zealand (Auckland University College was yet to be established). She graduated on 11 July 1877 with a Bachelor of Arts (specialising in mathematics and Latin) from the University of New Zealand. Her qualification was lauded and 1,000 people came to cheer as the Bishop awarded her with a camellia to symbolise her modesty and her achievement.

Edger and her sister, Lilian, both went on to obtain master's degrees from Canterbury College (now the University of Canterbury).

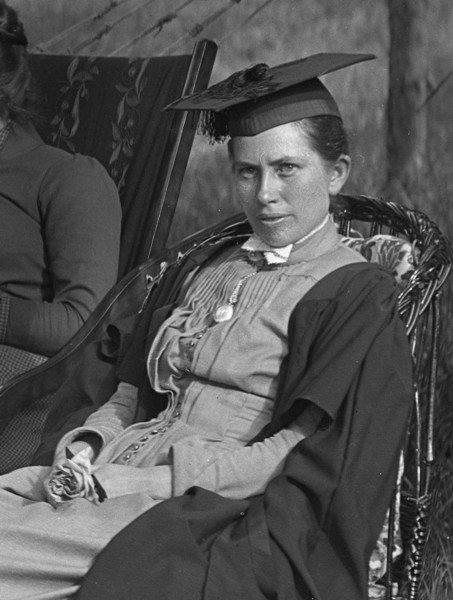
Kate Edgar c. 1885

== Career ==
Edger's first teaching position was at Christchurch Girls' High School. She was appointed the founding principal of Nelson College for Girls in 1883. In addition to being the principal she taught English grammar, composition and literature, physical science, Latin, mathematics, singing and geography. After her marriage in 1890 she intended to continue working, but later resigned. This is thought to be due to her pregnancy with her first child.

Edger had several positions in the Women's Christian Temperance Union New Zealand (WCTU NZ). She served as an assistant Corresponding Secretary, White Ribbon Associate Editor (11 years), Recording Secretary (15 years), national Superintendent of Scientific Temperance Teaching, and national Superintendent for Peace and Arbitration. She was also a founding member of Wellington's Society for the Protection of Women and Children, and a Dominion Secretary of the League of Nations Union of New Zealand.

== Personal life ==
Edger married William Evans in 1890. She supported her husband's charitable works by running a private school and taking on private pupils.

Kate's siblings were Louisa Florence Edger, Emily Marian Edger, Gertrude Evangeline Edger, Herbert Frank Edger and Margaret Lilian Florence Edger.

Edger's sister Gertrude had a daughter, Geraldine Hemus, who became the third woman in New Zealand to be admitted to practice law as a barrister and solicitor. Her elder sister Emily Marian Edger (1850-1935) married William Judson, noted for building a set of town houses at 203-209 Ponsonby Road, Auckland.

The fourth sister, Lilian Edger, was, like Kate, one of the first British women to earn a university degree. Lilian founded Ponsonby College, a secondary school for girls, in 1888. In the 1890s she was giving public lectures in Auckland on subjects such as ‘practical theosophy’ and ‘karma and re-incarnation’ and in 1899 completed an 18-month lecture tour of India and the Australian colonies. She died in New Zealand aged 79 in 1941, having resided in Benares, India, for forty years where she taught, gave lectures on theosophy and wrote several books on theosophical subjects. She was the principal of the Theosophical Girls’ School at Varanasi and was also in charge of the education of the two sons of the Maharaja of Darbhanga.

Their brother Herbert Edger was a lawyer, and a Native Land Court Judge from 1894 to 1909.

From 1921, on the death of her husband, Kater Edger lived in Wellington. She moved to Dunedin in 1932 where she died on 6 May 1935.

== Legacy ==
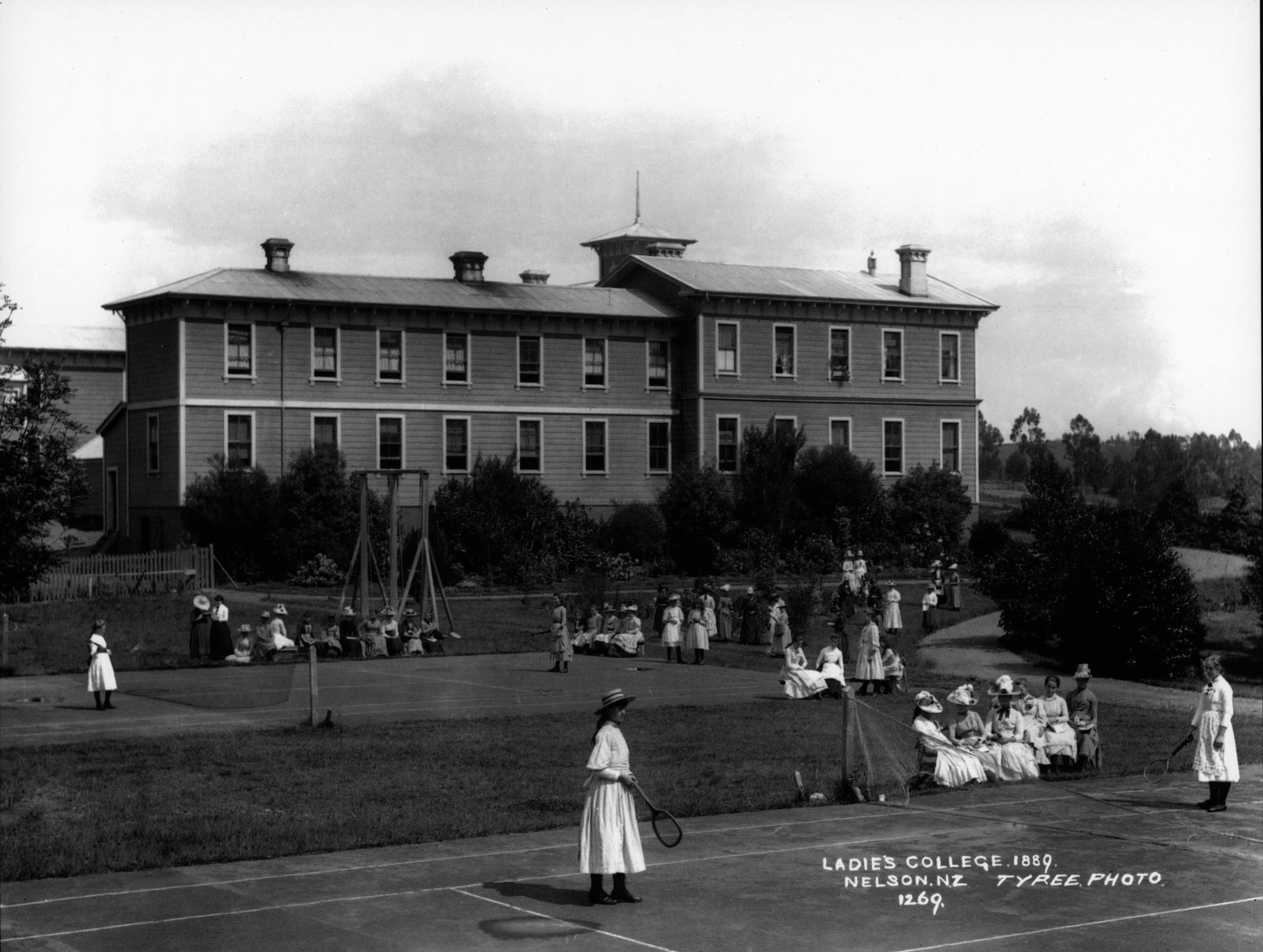
Tennis at the Ladies’ College (now Nelson College for Girls) in 1889 (15807860119)

The Kate Edger Educational Charitable Trust provides financial assistance for women pursuing undergraduate or postgraduate degrees. In 2004 the Kate Edger Information Commons was created at The University of Auckland.

In 2017, Kate Edger was chosen as one of the Royal Society of New Zealand's "150 Women in 150 Words" project. In September 2018, the Department of Mathematics at the University of Auckland was temporarily renamed to the "Kate Edger Department of Mathematics" to mark the 125th anniversary of women's suffrage in New Zealand.

In September 2023, Edger was awarded an honorary doctorate, as part of the University of Auckland's 140th anniversary celebrations. The award was accepted by Edger's granddaughter.
