= Geraldine Hemus =

New Zealand lawyer (1876–1969)

Geraldine Marian Hemus (11 November 1876 – 11 January 1969) was a New Zealand lawyer. She was the third woman in New Zealand to be admitted to the bar to practise law as a barrister and solicitor. Hemus also held positions with the National Council of Women of New Zealand and was a prominent member of the Auckland Theosophical Society.

== Early life ==
Hemus was born in Auckland on 11 November 1876, to Charles Hemus (a photographer) and Gertrude Evangeline Edger (a sister of Kate Edger, the first woman New Zealand to earn a university degree in New Zealand). Both her parents were immigrants from England and highly involved in theosophy. Their family home in Ponsonby was a centre for discussion and educational groups.

Hemus was educated at Ponsonby College, passing the matriculation examination in 1893 and the Senior Civil Servants Examination in 1895. She also studied shorthand with the Auckland Shorthand Writers' Association. Hemus went on to study law at Auckland University College.

== Career ==
In 1898, she became an articled clerk with Christopher James Parr, a sole practitioner. She was the first woman in Auckland to hold such a position. She later moved to work with the firm Neumegen and Elliott. Hemus was admitted as a barrister and solicitor on 15 February 1907. At some point she left Neumegen's firm and opened a sole practitioner's office.

Hemus was treasurer of the Auckland branch of the National Council of Women for most of the 1930s, and held the position of branch President from 1938 to 1941. In 1940, in her role as president, she sent a letter to Justice Minister HGR Mason, recommending the appointment of women associates in Magistrates' Courts for domestic proceedings.

Hemus also served as treasurer for the New Zealand executive of the Theosophical Society. She often spoke at the Theosophical Society public lectures, on topics such as "The Power of Thought", "Justice or Mercy, Which?", "The change that we call death", and "Prohibition: Some points of view". She was instrumental in the establishment of the Vasanta Garden School, which opened in Epsom in 1919, and was based on theosophical ideas of education. She continued as President of the Vasanta Garden School Trust Board during the 1930s.
