= 1914 Auckland City mayoral election =

New Zealand mayoral election

- 25 April 1914
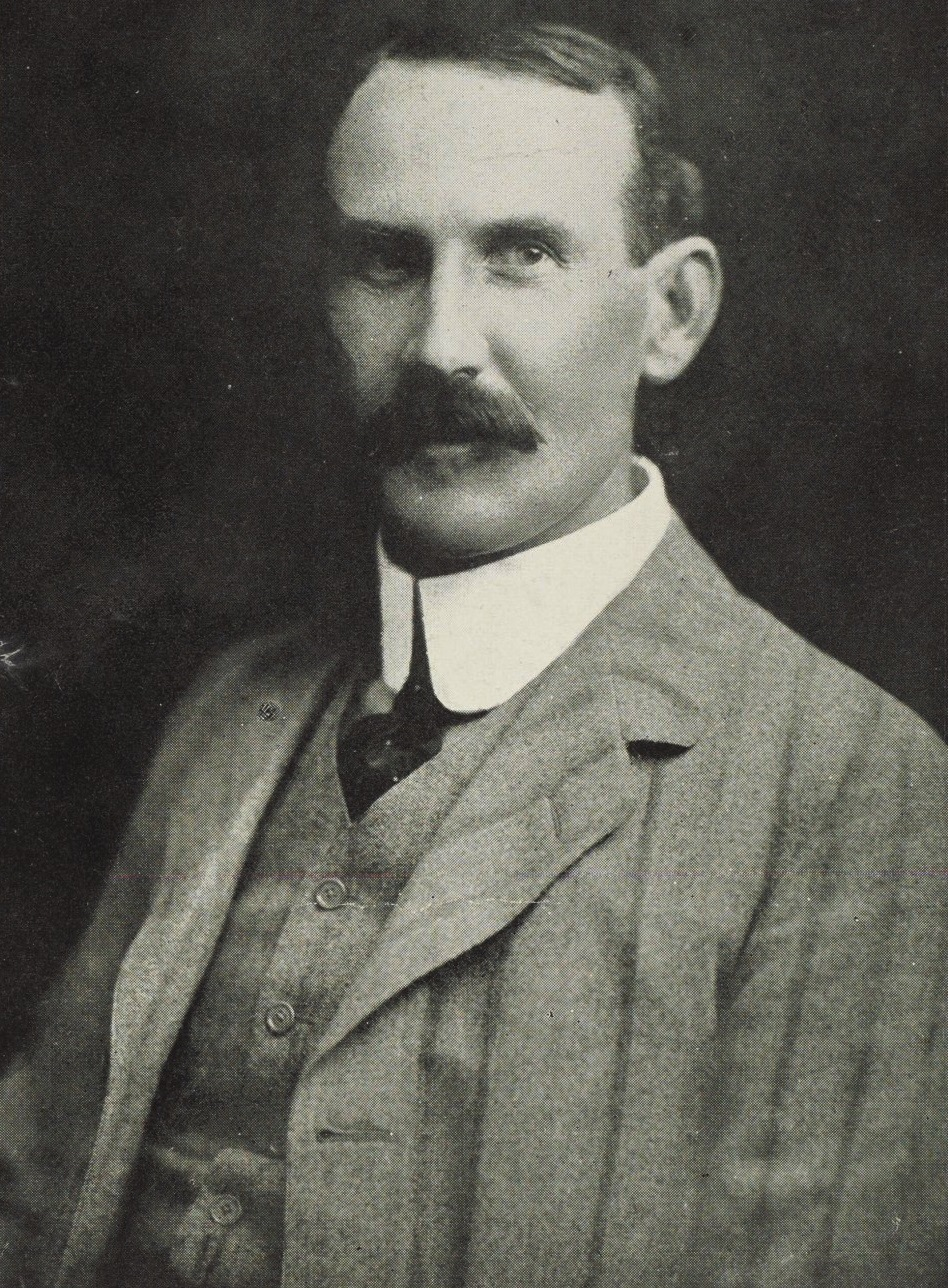
Candidate	James Parr
Party	Citizens
Popular vote	unopposed
Mayor before election
James Parr
Elected mayor
James Parr

The 1914 Auckland City mayoral election was part of the New Zealand local elections held that same year. In 1914, elections were held for the Mayor of Auckland. The polling was conducted using the standard first-past-the-post electoral method.

== Background ==
Incumbent mayor James Parr was re-elected unopposed with no alternative candidates emerging. At the same time the Borough of Grey Lynn was amalgamated with Auckland City. Grey Lynn's mayor George Baildon and its seven councillors were made members of the Auckland City Council until the next elections, which saw the number of councillors increased from eighteen to twenty-one.
