= Robert Frederick Way =

New Zealand politician and trade unionist

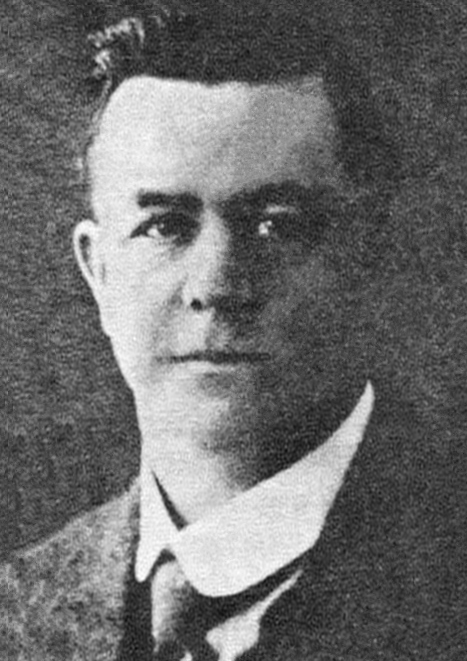
Robert Frederick Way.

Robert Frederick Way (1872 – 30 June 1947) was a New Zealand politician and trade unionist. He was an organiser and candidate for the Socialist Party, Social Democratic Party then the Labour Party standing many time for office himself.

== Biography ==
=== Early life ===
Way was born in 1872 in Australia. He spent his early years working as a journalist and studied at the University of Queensland without graduating before moving to New Zealand in 1900. Once in New Zealand he likewise worked as a journalist and became involved in the local labour movement. He was a regular contributor to the Maoriland Worker, New Zealand's leading labour journal of the time.

Prior to World War I he was highly active in the Auckland trade unions and was involved in the Waihi miners' strike. Way was secretary of the Auckland Waterside Workers' Union and president of the Auckland Coopers' and Curriers' Unions.

=== Political career ===
Way stood for election to the New Zealand House of Representatives five times. He stood for the New Zealand Socialist Party in Auckland East in 1905 and in Ohinemuri in 1908. He later stood as a Labour Party candidate in Auckland East in 1919, in Waitemata in 1922 and in Parnell in 1925. He also unsuccessfully stood for the Auckland City Council in 1905, 1907, 1919 and 1921.

He also sought the Labour nomination for the 1921 by-election in the Auckland East seat, but was beaten by John A. Lee.

== Death ==
Way died in 1947.
