= Bernard Martin (New Zealand politician) =

New Zealand politician

The Honourable Bernard Martin
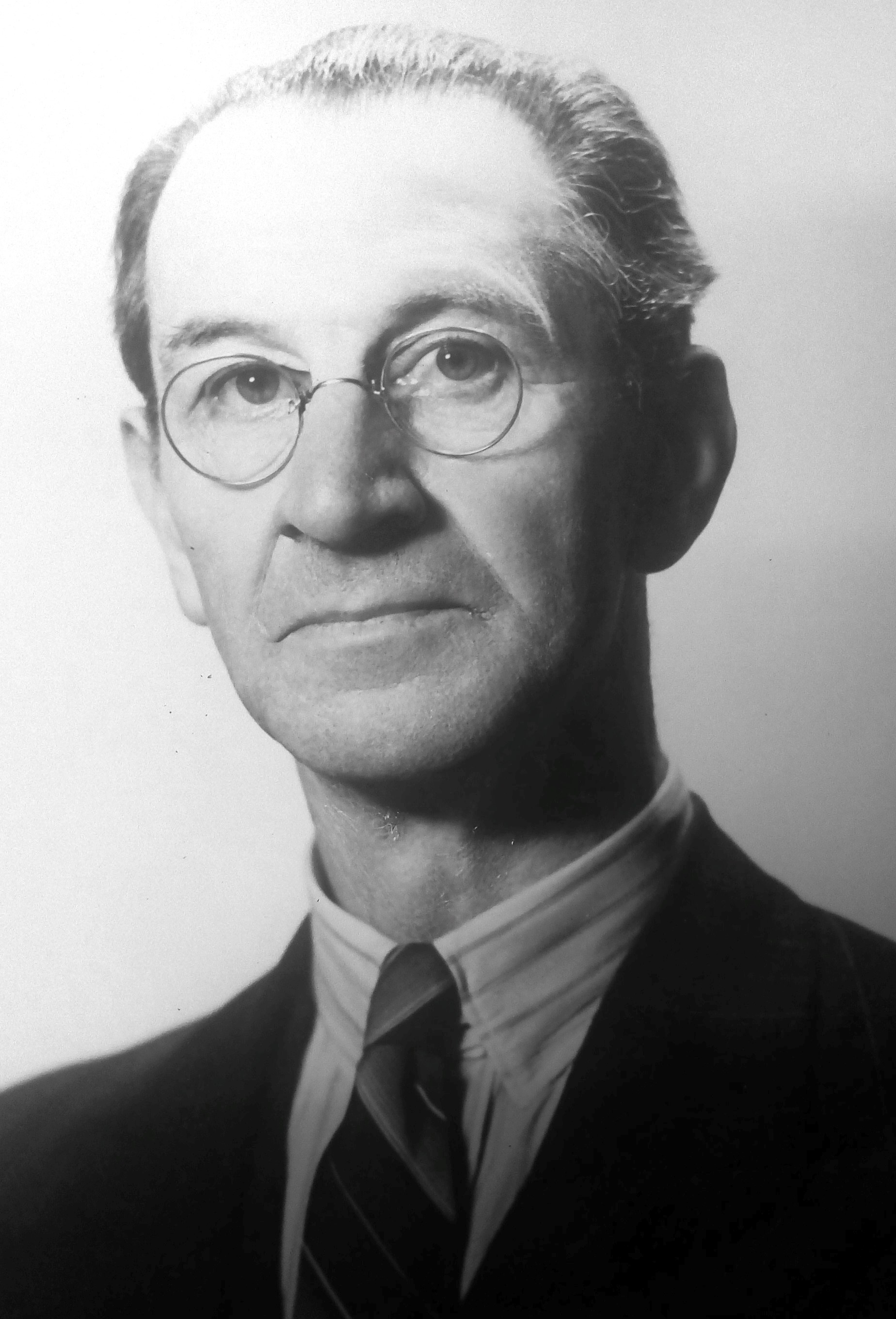

17th Speaker of the Legislative Council
- In office 29 June 1948 – 8 March 1950
- Preceded by: Mark Fagan
- Succeeded by: Thomas Otto Bishop

Personal details
- Born: 1882 England
- Died: 19 June 1956 (aged 74) Auckland, New Zealand
- Party: Labour
- Spouse: Minnie Ellen Fitzgerald (m. 1909)
- Relations: Mary Martin (daughter)
- Children: 3

Bernard Martin (1882 – 19 June 1956) was a New Zealand politician of the Labour Party and one of the party's pioneers.

== Biography ==
=== Early life and career ===
Martin was born in England in 1882. He migrated to New Zealand in 1900 and became involved in the local union movement. He first worked in Taranaki in butter factories before moving to Auckland in 1908. He was a founding member of the Workers' Educational Association (WEA).

In 1913 he became secretary of the Auckland Brewery Workers' Union until 1917 when he became secretary of the Coach Workers' Union. He was then elected a member of the first Executive of the Labour Party in 1916 and was president of the party's Eden branch. He was also the President of the Auckland Fabian Club and secretary of the Auckland Labour Representation Committee (1928–29, 1930–34).

=== Political career ===
A frequent candidate in local elections, he was on both the Auckland City Council (1931–33, 1935–38) and the Auckland University Council (1936–56). Between 1935 and 1938 (when Labour held a majority on the council) Martin served as Deputy-Mayor.

Martin was appointed to the New Zealand Legislative Council in 1936 and served for two terms until 8 March 1950. He was Chairman of Committees from 1939 to 1948, when he was promoted to Speaker from 1948 to the end of his tenure. Martin was regarded right throughout his career as an excellent chairman.

=== Death ===
Martin died on 19 June 1956 in Auckland. He was survived by his wife, son, daughter and five grandchildren.

== Notes ==
Political offices
Preceded by Andrew Entrican	Deputy Mayor of Auckland; 1935–1938	Succeeded by George Richardson
Preceded by Josiah Hanan	Chairman of Committees of the Legislative Council; 1939–1948	Succeeded by Michael Connelly
Preceded by Mark Fagan	Speaker of the New Zealand Legislative Council; 1948–1950	Succeeded by Thomas Otto Bishop
