= James Gunson =

New Zealand businessman and Mayor of Auckland City

Sir James Gunson CMG CBE
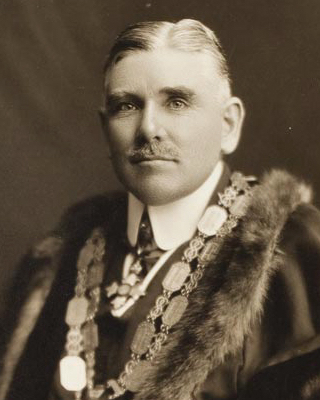
- Gunson in 1920

24th Mayor of Auckland City
- In office 5 May 1915 – 6 May 1925
- Deputy: Andrew Entrican (1915–20); Harold D. Heather (1920–22); George Baildon (1922–25)
- Preceded by: James Parr
- Succeeded by: George Baildon

Personal details
- Born: 26 October 1877 Auckland, New Zealand
- Died: 12 May 1963 (aged 85)
- Party: Reform
- Spouse: Jessie Helen Wiseman
- Children: 3

Sir James Henry Gunson CMG CBE (26 October 1877 – 12 May 1963) was a New Zealand businessman and Mayor of Auckland City from 1915 to 1925. He was knighted in 1924.

== W Gunson & Co ==
Born and educated in Auckland, in his mid-twenties he took over W Gunson & Co, the seed-grain and produce business his father founded in 1881. William Gunson died in 1902. In October 1916, now mayor of Auckland, James sold his father's stock and station agency to Wright Stephenson.

== Public life ==
James Gunson stood for Parliament several times without success; (Roskill in 1919, Eden in 1926 and then Auckland Suburbs in 1928).

== Auckland ==
Mayor from 1915 to 1925 he undertook the building of the war memorials Auckland Museum and Cenotaph, the Wintergardens in Auckland Domain and the construction of Tamaki Drive. In later public life, he was responsible for the monument on One Tree Hill (Maungakiekie) and the treeplanting of Cornwall Park fulfilling Sir John Logan Campbell's vision. Gunson was Chairman of the Auckland Harbour Board 1911–15, and was a member of the Government Railways Board 1931–35.

The Auckland War Memorial Museum's architects commissioned Kohn's Jewellers of Queen Street to create a finely detailed silver model of the museum. This was presented to Gunson upon completion of the museum, in recognition of his extensive work in leading the project. After the death of Sir James, the model was presented to the museum by his son Wallace Gunson, where it remains on display to this day.

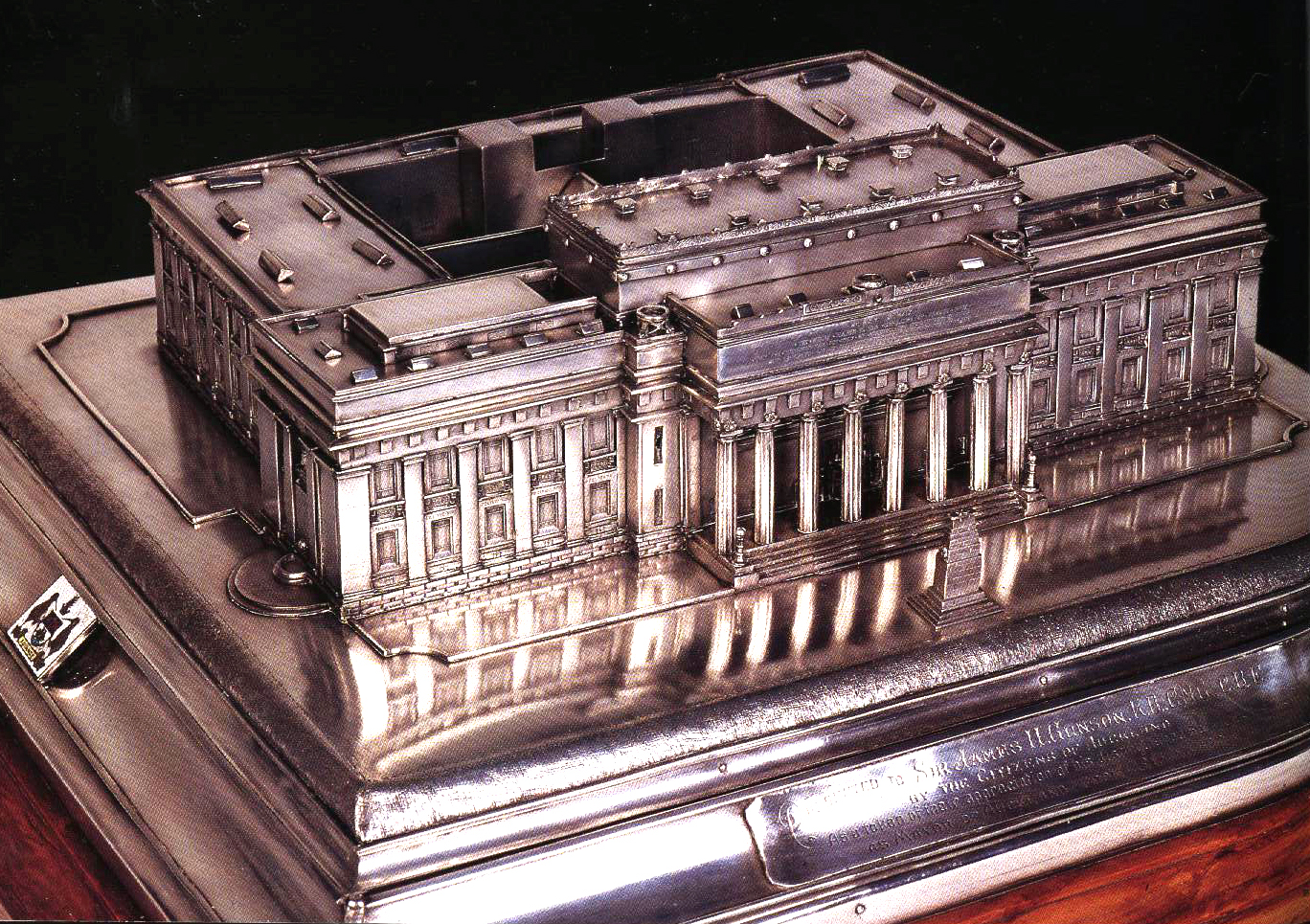
Presentation to Sir James Gunson. Auckland Museum Silver Model.

Several parts of the city bear his name or were his gift. His farming property to the South of Auckland in Manukau, called Totara Park, was later given to the city of Auckland. His main town residence, in St Andrew's Road, Epsom, became the Tongan royal residence, which it remains. A further Auckland property (named Rydal Mount after the residence of the English poet William Wordsworth) was by the same architect, Draffin, that Gunson had chosen to design Auckland Museum. Gunson Street, in Freemans Bay, Auckland, is named after him.

== Honours and awards ==
Gunson was appointed an Officer of the Order of the British Empire in March 1918, for services in connection with the war, and promoted to Commander of the Order of the British Empire in the 1919 King's Birthday Honours, for services in connection with patriotic undertakings. He was made a Companion of the Order of St Michael and St George in the 1922 New Year Honours. In the 1924 King's Birthday Honours, Gunson was appointed a Knight Bachelor, in recognition of his public services. In 1935, he was awarded the King George V Silver Jubilee Medal.

== Family ==
He married Jessie Helen Wiseman (later Lady Gunson OBE) in 1905. They had three children; William, Geoffrey and Margaret, the last of whom married British barrister Sir Rawden Temple. His brother Edward Burton Gunson MD FRCP (1883–1950) practised as a cardiologist in Auckland 1919–37. During World War One while in the RAMC EB Gunson assisted Thomas Lewis, the noted clinical scientist, in achieving an improved understanding of the Effort Syndrome. During World War Two Gunson worked for the Ministry of Supply in London publishing studies of women war workers' health.

Political offices
Preceded by James Parr	Mayor of Auckland City; 1915–1925	Succeeded by George Baildon
