= Henry Shaw (accountant) =

New Zealand accountant

Henry Shaw (5 September 1850 – 2 May 1928) was a British-born New Zealand accountant, bibliophile, and local politician.

Shaw was a member of the Auckland City Council from 1910 to 1912 and served on the council's library committee. He donated his large collection of rare antique books to the Auckland City Library.
