= Ellen Melville =

New Zealand politician (1882–1946)

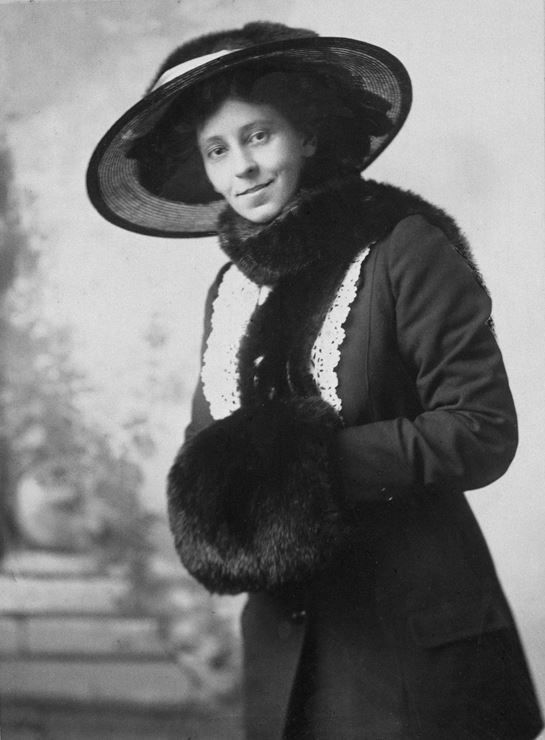

Auckland City Councillor
- In office 1913–1946

Personal details
- Born: Eliza Ellen Melville; 13 May 1882 Tokatoka, Northland, New Zealand
- Died: 27 July 1946 (aged 64) Remuera, Auckland, New Zealand
- Resting place: Waikumete Cemetery
- Party: Reform (1919–1922)
- Profession: Lawyer

Eliza Ellen Melville (13 May 1882 – 27 July 1946) was a New Zealand lawyer and politician. She was New Zealand's second female lawyer, and the first woman elected to a city council in New Zealand. She sat on the Auckland City Council for 33 years and supported women's organisations and causes, including in particular the National Council of Women of New Zealand. She believed in the importance of women participating fully and equally in public life, and was a key figure in the revival of the feminist movement in New Zealand after women's suffrage. She was one of the first women to stand for Parliament in New Zealand and ultimately stood (unsuccessfully) seven times.

== Early life ==
Melville was born in Tokatoka, a neighbourhood in Arapohue, on the Wairoa River south of Dargaville. Her father Alexander Melville was a farmer and boatbuilder, while her mother Eliza (née Fogarty) was a former teacher, who had run a private school in Hokitika with her sister in the 1870s. Melville was the third of their seven children.

She was taught at home by her mother until she was seven, and her mother's influence contributed to her lifelong belief in the importance of education and knowledge. Later in life she was to speak of the "armour of education". From age seven she attended Tokatoka School. In 1895 she was second in New Zealand in the Junior District Scholarship, which entitled her to study for three years at what is now Auckland Girls' Grammar School (then part of Auckland Grammar School). She boarded with relatives in Auckland during this period. Although it is not known why Martin decided to become a lawyer, it was while she was at secondary school that Ethel Benjamin became the first woman to be admitted as a lawyer in New Zealand.

== Legal career ==
In 1898, Melville finished secondary school and passed the Solicitors' General Knowledge Examination. She was too young to study law at university at this time, so joined the Auckland firm of Devore and Cooper (later Devore and Martin) as a clerk and received her early training there. One of the partners, Albert Devore was a former mayor of Auckland and encouraged her to enter local politics, and the law firm was supportive of her studies. In 1904 she enrolled at Auckland University College. Her family was unable to provide her with financial support so she attended night classes and continued working at the firm. While studying she met and befriended Geraldine Hemus, the only other female law student at the time.

When Melville was admitted to the bar in 1906, she was only the second woman in New Zealand to reach this stage after Ethel Benjamin. Melville established her own legal practice, being the first woman in New Zealand to do so, and practised on her own account for 37 years. Her legal practice consisted mainly of conveyancing and was a means of financial support, which enabled her to establish a political career.

== Political career ==
Melville was highly active in promoting women's causes, and in encouraging full participation by women in public life. Much of her activity centred on women's associations and committees, and she held a number of senior positions in such organisations. She was a strong advocate of women seeking political office. She felt it was important, however, that women in politics not confine themselves to women's concerns: speaking in 1921 she said "women must act as Citizens rather than members of one sex and work not as women against men, but as men and women together". She also believed that there should be no favours for women because of their sex, and argued that women had to compete equally with men to earn their place in the world.

=== Auckland City Council ===
In the 1913 Auckland City election she became the first woman to be elected to a city council in New Zealand, gaining a seat on the Auckland City Council which she held for 33 consecutive years to 1946. In this role she introduced women's groups to the council and fought discrimination on such issues as the employment of women as tram conductors and the granting of taxi licences to women. She tended to be conservative in issues not relating to women's rights, and took part in all aspects of civic work, including sitting on the key finance committee, chairing the library committee and working on parks issues. Journalist Robin Hyde observed that although initially Melville was viewed by her male colleagues as "rather an improper joke", she came to be respected for her "logical mind and abundant common sense ... The contributions she made to debates were always models of their kind, brief, completely thought-out and containing original ideas of real value." She was, however, passed over in 1938 and 1941 for the role of deputy mayor, despite being the most qualified candidate by virtue of seniority and ability, which resulted in objections from women's groups.

=== Women's organisations ===
Melville was a driver of the revival of the National Council of Women of New Zealand (NCW) in 1918, having called the first meeting of the Auckland NCW branch in 1917, and the following year attending the preliminary conference in Wellington where the NCW was formally reinstated. She became the first president of the Auckland branch and from 1919 to 1922 was national president. In her work for the NCW she travelled to Europe in 1924 with Elsie Mary Griffin in order to meet other prominent feminists. In the United Kingdom she assisted Lady Astor with her electioneering campaign and stayed with Lady Aberdeen. In 1934 she was a delegate to the conference of the Pan-Pacific and South East Asian Women's Association in Honolulu.

During the Depression, she argued that women should pay the same unemployment levy as men in order to qualify for relief work. She also spoke out against an NCW resolution that domestic workers should not pay tax, saying that those who had proposed the resolution had "allowed a lot of sloppy sentiment to influence them ... The women who follow this employment are honoured and valued citizens who should be prepared to bear the burden of tax. If the National Council stands for the equality of women, it cannot endorse this pernicious exception." She also held office in the Auckland Unemployed Women's Emergency Committee during this time, and travelled around the country urging people to buy New Zealand-made goods and support local businesses.

She believed strongly that women must work together to advance their cause, and established a number of other women's groups, including the Auckland YWCA Club for businesswomen, of which she was secretary and later vice-president, the Auckland Lyceum Club and the New Zealand Society for the Protection of Women and Children. In 1914 she founded a woman's society called the Auckland Civic League, with the goal of working with the city to improve social conditions. She urged women to take a broad view and "get in personal touch with the women's movement throughout the world".

=== Parliamentary campaigns ===
Melville was active in the campaign that led to the Women's Parliamentary Rights Act 1919, allowing women to stand for Parliament for the first time (despite women having been given the vote in 1893). Melville believed that:

... women would get nothing done for them in the legislation unless they had women in parliament. They knew what became of their conference resolutions which were forwarded to the government, and went into the waste-paper basket. They would make no progress until they got women in the House.

Together with Rosetta Baume and Aileen Cooke, Melville was one of the first three women to stand for Parliament in New Zealand. In the 1919 general election, she was the candidate for the Reform Party in the electorate of Grey Lynn. Despite the fact that this electorate was traditionally a Labour seat, she won 30.9% of the vote to Labour's 36.5%. Baume and Cooke also failed to be elected, and a political cartoon at the time showed two women standing outside a house labelled "Woman's Kingdom", with Baume saying to Melville: "After all, dear, there's no place like home for a woman. We can always get elected to this house without opposition." In the 1922 general election, she was not selected as a candidate, allegedly being blocked by political organiser Albert Davy. Melville believed that she had been blocked due to the Reform Party not wanting a woman as a candidate (in part because the selected candidate was a former member of the Liberal Party), and she stood as an independent candidate in Roskill. She was however selected as the Reform Party's candidate for Grey Lynn in the 1925 general election, and secured 5,296 votes against the incumbent's 6,061. The Hokitika Guardian noted that she had secured more votes "than any other woman has ever polled".

In a 1926 by-election in Eden, after being dissatisfied with the Reform Party's process of candidate selection, she stood as an independent candidate. Having two candidates split the Reform Party's vote and assisted Rex Mason, the Labour Party candidate, to win the seat; an event which damaged her reputation within the party. She subsequently stood in the 1928 general election, the 1931 general election, and the 1943 election, generally performing well but never winning. Although unsuccessful, her campaigns gave her an opportunity to publicise and advance the interests of the NCW, including raising the age of consent and appointing women police.

She was one of six candidates who stood for selection for the Auckland East electorate by the National Party for the 1938 election, but Harry Merritt was chosen instead.

== Later years and legacy ==
In 1935, Melville was awarded the King George V Silver Jubilee Medal. In 1944, she founded the Women for Wellington movement, which encouraged women to stand for Parliament and other political offices, and provided training on public speaking and committee work. It was however a small group and did not survive her death.

Melville died on 27 July 1946 in Remuera. Her coffin was laid in state in the Auckland City Council chamber, and the city flags were flown at half-mast. The prime minister, Peter Fraser, spoke at her funeral, which was attended by hundreds of representatives of women's groups and local authorities. Three trucks were needed to take flowers to the graveside at Waikumete Cemetery.

After her death, the NCW called a meeting in Auckland to discuss an appropriate memorial for her. The city mayor, John Allum, said at this meeting that "her service will remain forever an example to all citizens and in particular to the younger women of our city and indeed of our dominion". It was at this meeting that the NCW decided to commemorate her by building a hall for women, which led to the opening of the Ellen Melville Hall (now the Ellen Melville Centre) in central Auckland in 1962. When the centre was refurbished in 2017, a new bronze sculpture by Lisa Reihana, titled Justice, was added to the outside of the building to celebrate Melville's life and work.

Melville Park in Epsom is also named after her, having been acquired by the city in 1917, and for many years has had a reputation as a women's sportsground.
