= Emily Maguire (politician) =

New Zealand politician and feminist

Emily Maguire (née Herbert; 1 April 1873 – 9 August 1961) was a New Zealand community worker, local politician and feminist. She was born in Burnley, Lancashire, England on 1 April 1873. She was a member of Auckland City Council from 1918 to 1923. She contested the 1928 election for the Reform Party in the Auckland East electorate, but came last of the three candidates.
