= Jonathan Trevethick =

Member of the New Zealand Legislative Council

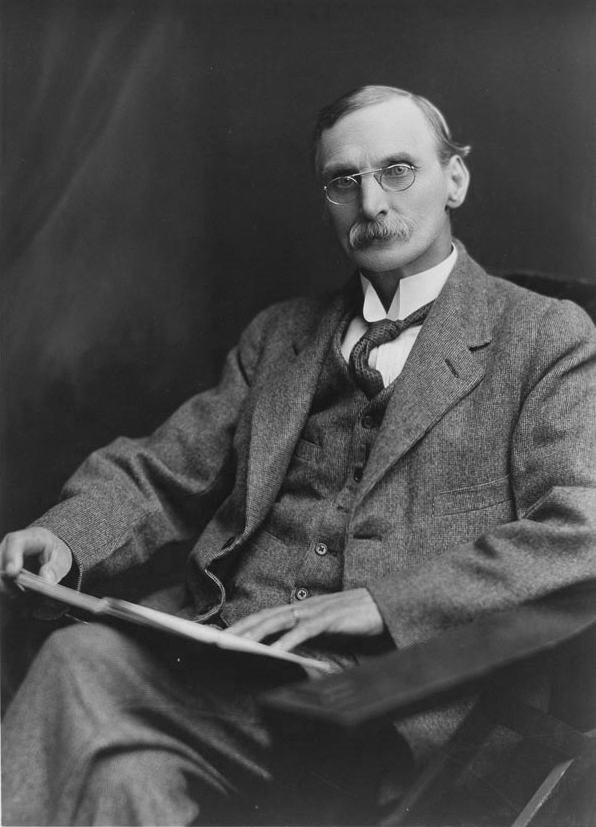
Trevethick in 1920.

Jonathan Trevethick (1864 – 16 October 1939) was a New Zealand politician. He was a member of the New Zealand Legislative Council from 1930 to 1939.

== Biography ==
He was born in Lostwithiel, Cornwall, and educated at Lostwithiel School. He emigrated to New Zealand with his wife Edith in 1888, and joined his brother Charles, who had a brushmaking business in Lower Hutt. He married Edith, daughter of William Higgs in 1887 in Cornwall. They had two sons and four daughters. In 1892 he moved to Auckland and established a brushmaking business there. He was a member of the Liberal Party, serving for a time as party president, and a member of the Auckland City Council from 1910 to 1921.

He was appointed to the New Zealand Legislative Council on 11 June 1930 by the United Government; his term was to 10 June 1937. He was reappointed to the council by the Labour Government on 22 September 1937, and remained on it until his death in 1939.

In 1935, he was awarded the King George V Silver Jubilee Medal.

Trevethick died at his home in Auckland on 16 October 1939 aged 75 years after an illness of several months, and was buried at Purewa Cemetery.
