= Charles Grey (mayor) =

New Zealand businessman and politician (1859–1925)

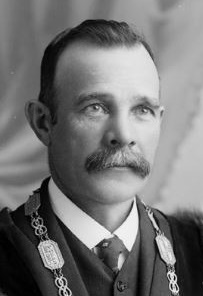

21st Mayor of Auckland City
- In office 2 March 1909 – 4 May 1910
- Preceded by: Arthur Myers
- Succeeded by: Lemuel Bagnall

Personal details
- Born: 1859 Ballarat, Victoria
- Died: 10 February 1925 (aged 65–66) Auckland, New Zealand
- Spouse: Fanny May Edwards
- Children: 5

Charles Grey (1859 – 10 February 1925), was a New Zealand businessman and politician who was Mayor of Auckland City from 1909 to 1910.

== Biography ==
=== Early life and career ===
Grey was born in 1859 in Ballarat, Victoria. He emigrated to New Zealand as a child with his parents in 1861. He grew up in Thames and finished his education at Auckland University College. In 1890 he became a member of the firm of his father's business; John Grey and Sons (later Grey and Menzies), an aerated water manufacturer. In 1896 he became sole owner of the business. He married Fanny May Edwards in 1897 and had two sons and three daughters.

=== Political career ===
In September 1896 Grey was elected to the Auckland City Council to fill the seat left vacant by the death of his father. He was later to serve as Mayor of Auckland City from 1909 to 1910. Arthur Myers did not serve out his full term and resigned the mayoralty in March 1909. Grey was elected by the council members to fill the vacancy for the remainder of the term. He was confirmed for a full term in his own right at the 1909 local elections.

=== Death ===
Grey died in 1925 and was buried at Waikumete Cemetery.

== Notes ==
Political offices
| Preceded by Arthur Myers | Mayor of Auckland City; 1909–1910 | Succeeded by Lemuel Bagnall |
