= John Court (philanthropist) =

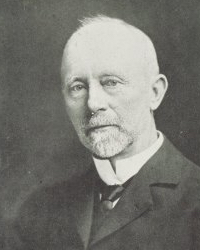

John Court (21 January 1846 – 6 July 1933) was a New Zealand draper, businessman, city councillor and philanthropist. He was born in Bradley Green, Worcestershire, England, on 21 January 1846.
