= John Patterson (Auckland politician) =

New Zealand politician (1855–1923)

John Patterson (15 January 1855 – 25 March 1923) was an Auckland city councillor from 1900 to 1903 and again from 1908 to 1911, and was a prominent businessman in Auckland.

== Early life ==
Patterson was born in Auckland in 1855. He was educated at St Peter's School and was apprenticed to the Leahy Dock Ironworks, where he remained for about thirteen years.

== Business ==
Patterson was in business as a coachbuilder, wheelwright, farrier, and general blacksmith, first in Karangahape Road and then in Upper Queen St. He was a justice of the peace (from 1894) and a member of the Auckland Licensing Committee. He was also a lieutenant in the Royal Irish Volunteers.

== Politics ==
Patterson was a supporter of the New Zealand Liberal Party. He was first elected to the Auckland City Council in 1900 representing the Karangahape ward, which was eliminated under the Municipal Corporations Act 1900 for the 1901 local body elections. Patterson was re-elected a councillor in a by-election in 1908 by which time the ward system had been abolished in Auckland. He was re-elected in the 1909 local body elections. He ceased to be a councillor in 1911. His party on the council was the Citizens League.

== Death ==
Patterson died on 25 March 1923 at his residence in England Street, Ponsonby. He is buried at Waikaraka Cemetery in Onehunga. He was survived by his wife and 12 children.
