= Patrick Nerheny =

New Zealand politician

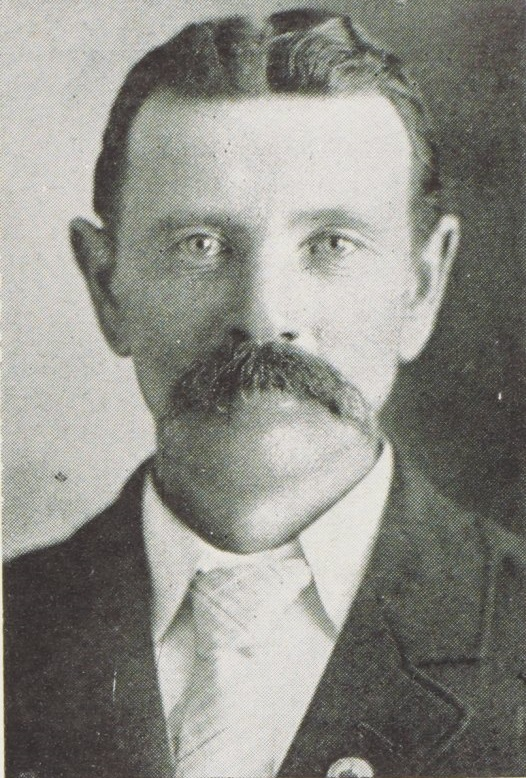
Nerheny in 1910

Patrick Joseph Nerheny (1858 – 2 December 1921) was a member of the New Zealand Legislative Council from 25 June 1920 to 2 December 1921, when he died aged 63y. He was appointed by the Reform Government.

He was from Auckland and served as an Auckland City Councillor. in 1910 he ran for mayor, but was defeated by Lemuel Bagnall.
