= Andrew Entrican =

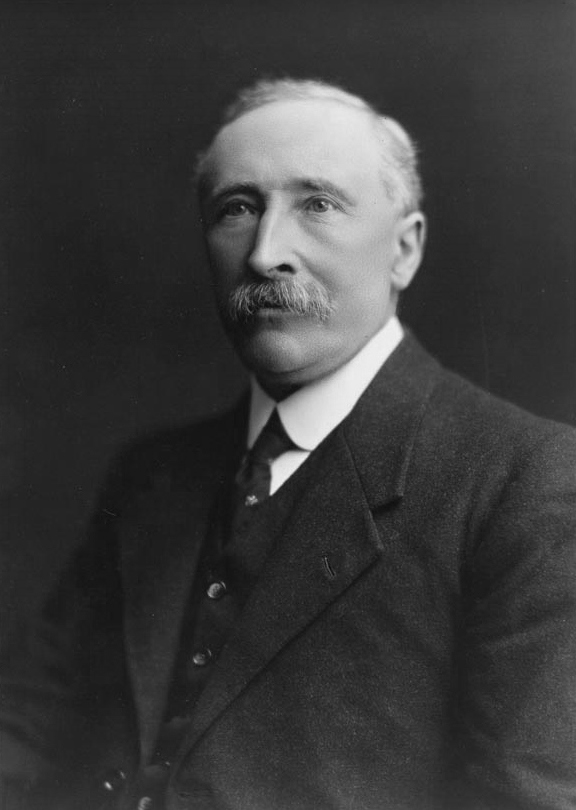
- Entrican in 1920

2nd Deputy Mayor of Auckland
- In office 12 May 1927 – 16 May 1935
- Preceded by: James Warnock
- Succeeded by: Bernard Martin
- In office 20 May 1915 – 28 October 1920
- Preceded by: John Court
- Succeeded by: Harold D. Heather

Personal details
- Born: 31 October 1858 Stoneyfalls, County Tyrone, Ireland
- Died: 19 February 1936 (aged 77) Auckland, New Zealand
- Party: Liberal
- Spouse: Elizabeth Mary Mackay (m. 1883)
- Children: 1
- Profession: Businessman

Andrew Jack Entrican (31 October 1858 – 19 February 1936) was an Irish-born New Zealand businessman and local-body politician. He was twice deputy mayor of Auckland.

== Biography ==
=== Early life ===
Entrican was born at Stoneyfalls, near Strabane in County Tyrone, Ireland (now Northern Ireland) in 1858 to Robert Entrican, a local farmer, and his wife Jane (née Jack) and was educated at Edwards School.

In 1883, he married Elizabeth Mackay with whom he had one son, Robert Gilbert (Bert) Entrican.

=== Business career ===
He began his business career in Derry with a firm of merchants. When he was 21 he emigrated to New Zealand arriving in Auckland in January 1880 on the ship Ben Nevis. After his arrival he became the assistant manager of a retail business owned by Charles Major, later taking it over himself in partnership with Samuel Taylor. This business was dissolved in 1885 and Entrican then became a commission agent. In 1887 he established the firm of A. J. Entrican and Company (later joined by his younger brother, James Cuthbertson Entrican), general merchants, and served as executive manager until his death. The firm built and occupied a building known as the Entrican Building at 36-38 Customs Street, Auckland (which is now known as Australis House). The company was renamed as A. J. Entrican, Sims & Co. Ltd. after a merger in 1932. After Andrew Entrican's death it was managed by his brother James and subsequently by his son Bert. The business was eventually sold to LD Nathan & Co. Ltd. in 1966.

=== Political career ===
In 1897, he was elected to the Auckland Harbour Board and the following year to the Auckland City Council. He resigned from the Harbour Board in 1899 but remained on the council until 1918, and again from 1920 until 1935. He served under 10 Mayors, and was deputy to six of them, holding that office for two separate terms for a combined 17 years. A popular councillor he was returned at the top of the City Council poll on three occasions. Entrican was returned to the Harbour Board in 1907 and remained a member until 1921, serving as chairman between 1910 and 1911. Entrican and Ernest Davis resigned from the city council in 1920 owing to a ruling by the Audit Department in connection with the purchase of certain land sections in Anzac Avenue by A. J. Entrican and Co., Ltd. from Auckland City Council. As director of the firm he could not legally retain his council seat.

He contested the Auckland West electorate as the Liberal Party candidate in the 1919 election where he polled third out of three candidates. The right-of-centre vote was split between the Liberal Party and Reform Party candidates, and the newly elected MP was one Michael Joseph Savage of the Labour Party.

He was also a trustee of the Auckland Savings Bank, a member of the executive of the Auckland Patriotic Association, the Auckland Fire Board, the Auckland and Suburban Drainage Board. He was a member of the Ulstermen's Association and was a staunch member of St. James Presbyterian Church in Mount Eden.

=== Death ===
He died on 19 February 1936 of a stroke. Entrican Avenue in Remuera, Auckland, was named after him in 1939.

Political offices
| Preceded by John Court | Deputy Mayor of Auckland; 1915–1920 1927–1935 | Succeeded by Harold D. Heather |
| Preceded by James Warnock | Deputy Mayor of Auckland; 1915–1920 1927–1935 | Succeeded by Bernard Martin |
