= James Parr (politician) =

New Zealand lawyer and politician

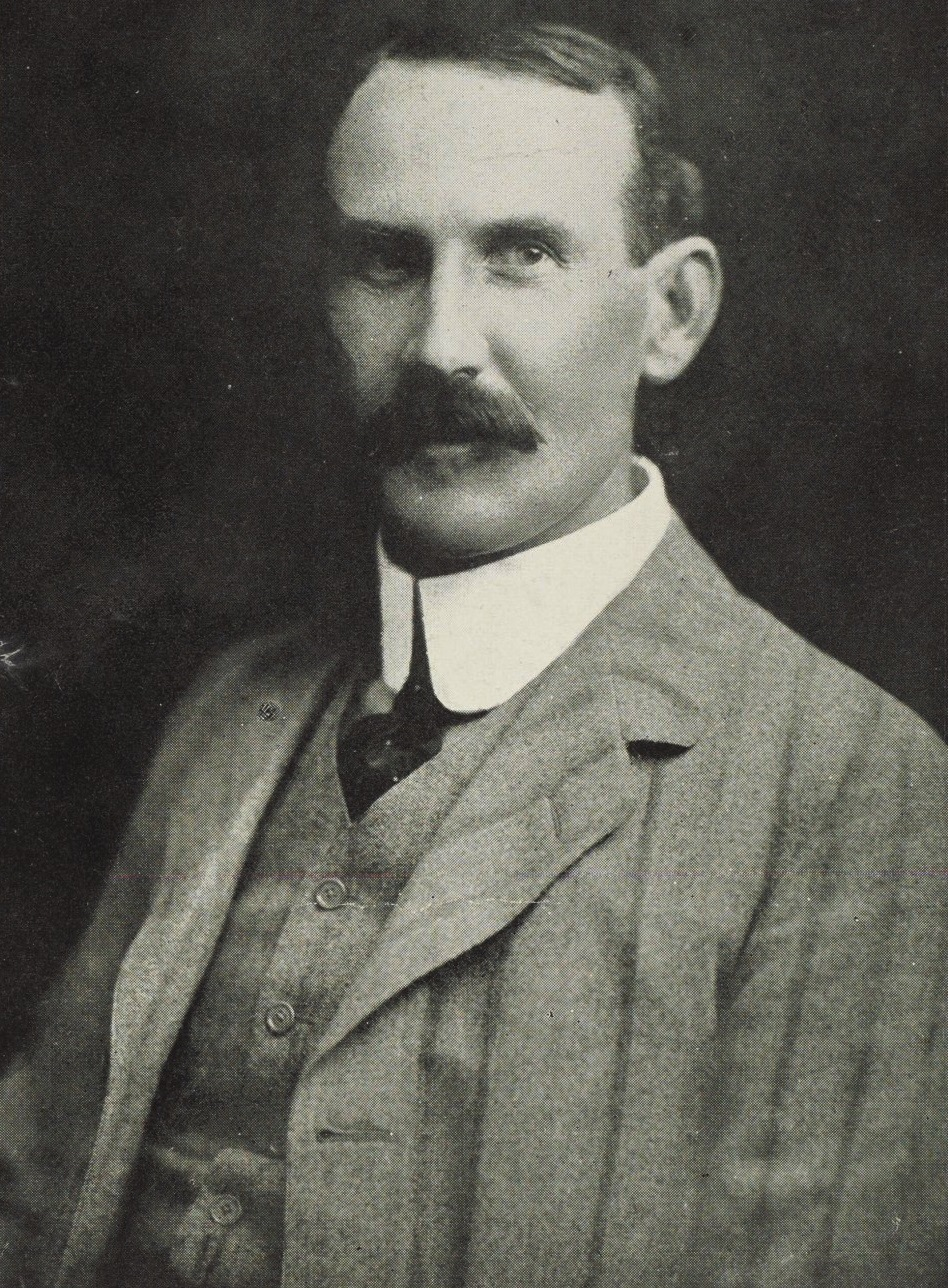
Parr in 1911

Sir Christopher James Parr GCMG (18 May 1869 – 2 May 1941) was a New Zealand lawyer and politician of the Reform Party. He was Mayor of Auckland, a Member of Parliament representing the Eden electorate, a Minister in the Reform Government, High Commissioner in London and a Member of the New Zealand Legislative Council.

== Early life ==
Parr was born in Pukerimu near Cambridge in 1869. Parr's family moved to Waihou and went to school there. He received education in Thames, Auckland Grammar School, and Auckland University College. Parr studied law and was admitted to the Bar in 1890. He practiced in Coromandel and Auckland.

== Political career ==
New Zealand Parliament
Years	Term	Electorate	Party
1914–1919	19th	Eden	Reform
1919–1922	20th	Eden	Reform
1922–1925	21st	Eden	Reform
1925–1926	22nd	Eden	Reform

Parr was Mayor of Auckland.

He represented the electorate of Eden from 1914 to 1926. He was Minister of Education (3 April 1920 – 24 April 1926) in three successive ministries of the Reform Government. He was Minister of Public Health (3 April 1920 – 27 June 1923) under William Massey. He was Minister of Justice (27 June 1923 – 18 January 1926) under Massey, Francis Bell and Gordon Coates. He was Postmaster General and Minister of Telegraphs (30 May 1925 – 24 April 1926) under Coates.

On 11 March 1926, he opened the Mount Albert Grammar School hall.

He resigned from Parliament on 26 March 1926 to take up his appointment as High Commissioner in London. The resulting by-election was won by Rex Mason of the Labour Party, because the Reform Party vote was split. As High Commissioner, Parr defended how New Zealand governed Western Samoa, which was C mandate under the League of Nations. New Zealand repressed freedoms of the press, freedoms of association, and free speech in Samoa, as well as banished those who criticised New Zealand's rule. Parr dismissed grievances that Samoans expressed about New Zealand's rule, describing them as a "simple and loveable race... ready to listen to any tale, and hence... most susceptible to the wiles of the agitator." He argued against democracy for Samoans. Parr falsely claimed that there was no "real Samoan desire for self-government."

Parr was High Commissioner to the United Kingdom for just over three years (1 August 1926 – 31 December 1929). On his return to New Zealand, he was appointed a member of the Legislative Council on 9 October 1931. His wife died on 4 November 1933 and in mid November, he had been appointed High Commissioner again. He resigned from the Legislative council effective 31 December 1933 and commenced his second term as High Commissioner the following day; a post that he held until 31 August 1936. He retired in Berkhamsted, England and remarried there.

== Awards and death ==
Parr was appointed Companion of the Order of St Michael and St George in 1914, promoted to Knight Commander in 1924 and further promoted to Knight Grand Cross in the 1935 King's Birthday Honours. He died on 2 May 1941 in Berkhamsted.

== Notes ==
New Zealand Parliament
Preceded by John Bollard	Member of Parliament for Eden; 1914–1926	Succeeded by Rex Mason
Political offices
Preceded by Lemuel Bagnall	Mayor of Auckland City; 1911–1915	Succeeded by James Gunson
Preceded by Francis Bell	Minister of Education; 1920–1926	Succeeded by Robert Wright
Preceded by Francis Bell	Minister of Public Health; 1920–1923	Succeeded by Maui Pomare
Preceded by Francis Bell	Minister of Justice; 1923–1926	Succeeded by Frank Rolleston
Preceded by Francis Bell	Minister of Police; 1923–1926	Succeeded by Frank Rolleston
Preceded by Gordon Coates	Postmaster-General and Minister of Telegraphs; 1925–1926	Succeeded by William Nosworthy
Diplomatic posts
Preceded by James Allen	High Commissioner of New Zealand to the United Kingdom; 1926–1930; 1935–1936	Succeeded by Thomas Wilford
Preceded by Thomas Wilford	High Commissioner of New Zealand to the United Kingdom; 1926–1930; 1935–1936	Succeeded by Bill Jordan
