= Lemuel Bagnall =

New Zealand businessman and politician (1844–1917)

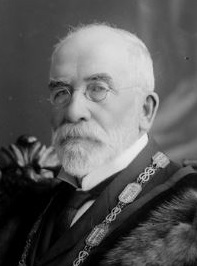

22nd Mayor of Auckland City
- In office 4 May 1910 – 3 May 1911
- Preceded by: Charles Grey
- Succeeded by: James Parr

Personal details
- Born: 1844 New Glasgow, Prince Edward island, British North America
- Died: 30 April 1917 (aged 72–73) Auckland, New Zealand

Lemuel John Bagnall (1844 – 30 April 1917), was a New Zealand businessman and politician who was Mayor of Auckland City from 1910 to 1911.

== Biography ==
=== Early life and career ===
Bagnall was born in New Glasgow, Prince Edward Island, Canada. Along with his father, George, he came to Auckland in 1864. He became involved in the timber trade and in 1878 purchased a sawmill on the Waihou river with his brothers which they operated till 1912.

=== Political career ===
Bagnall represented Thames in the Auckland Provincial Council from 1873 to 1875. He was also a member of the Thames Harbour Board, member and chairman of the Thames County Council, the Auckland Education Board and a member of the Auckland Land Board. Bagnall stood for Parliament for the Auckland Central electorate in the 1905 general election as a conservative candidate, but was defeated by Alfred Kidd. Previously he was a candidate in the Te Aroha by-election, but retired from the contest as public support for the government was strong, and that as opposition candidate he would not find sufficient support.

He was an Auckland City Councillor from 1903 to 1910. In 1910 he was elected Mayor of Auckland City, defeating councillor Patrick Nerheny. He retired from politics when his term ended in 1911. His brother, merchant Horatio Nelson Bagnall, was a councillor from 1913 until he died in 1922. Bagnall also served as Church Secretary for the Thames Church of Christ.

=== Later life and death ===
He later became director of several companies; the Kauri Timber Company, the New Zealand Insurance Company, Milne & Choyce and the Auckland Farmers' Freezing Company.

Bagnall died on 30 April 1917.

== Notes ==
Political offices
Preceded by Charles Grey	Mayor of Auckland City; 1910–1911	Succeeded by James Parr
