= 1924 Birthday Honours =

British government recognitions

The 1924 Birthday Honours were appointments by King George V to various orders and honours to reward and highlight good works by citizens of the British Empire. The appointments were made to celebrate the official birthday of The King, and were published in The London Gazette on 3 June 1924.

The recipients of honours are displayed here as they were styled before their new honour, and arranged by honour, with classes (Knight, Knight Grand Cross, etc.) and then divisions (Military, Civil, etc.) as appropriate.

== United Kingdom and British Empire ==
=== Privy Councillor ===
The King appointed the following to His Majesty's Most Honourable Privy Council:

- Thomas Power O'Connor MP For political services

=== Baronetcies ===
- Alexander Grant, Chairman of the firm of McVittie and Price. For public services.
- Sir Humphry Davy Rolleston KCB DCL President of the Royal College of Physicians

=== Knight Bachelor ===
- Gerald Bellhouse CBE Chief Inspector of Factories, Home Office
- David Young Cameron RA In recognition of his contributions to Art
- Richard Davies CBE JP Deputy, Alderman and Chief Commoner, Corporation, of London
- William Galloway For public services
- Benjamin Hawkins, Solicitor to the Board of Customs and Excise
- Fred Hiam, For public services
- George Anthony King Chief Master, Supreme Court Taxing Office
- Charles Mendl, For services to His Majesty's Embassy, Paris
- Harold George Parlett CMG Japanese Counsellor of His Majesty's Embassy, Tokyo
- The Rt. Hon. William Lowrie Sleigh JP DL Lord Provost of Edinburgh
- Alderman John Utting JP DL Chairman of Finance Committee, Liverpool Corporation. Lord Mayor of Liverpool, 1917–18
- Ralph Lewis Wedgwood CB CMG General Manager, London and North Eastern Railway
- Arthur Smith Woodward lately Keeper of Geology in the British Museum

British India

- Provash Chandra Mitter CIE Vakil, High Court, Calcutta, Bengal, late Minister, Government of Bengal
- Justice Victor Murray Coutts-Trotter, Chief Justice, Madras High Court,
- Justice Babington Bennett Newbould, Indian Civil Service, Puisne Judge, High Court, Calcutta, Bengal
- Justice Henry Scott-Smith, Indian Civil Service, Puisne Judge, High Court, Lahore, Punjab
- Justice Theodore Garo Piggott, Indian Civil Service, Puisne Judge, High Court, Allahabad, United Provinces
- Montagu Sherard Dawes Butler CB CIE CVO CBE Indian Civil Service, Secretary to the Government of India in the Department of Education, Health and Lands
- Peter Henry Clutterbuck CIE OBE VD Inspector-General of Forests
- Gilbert Thomas Walker CSI Director-General of Observatories in India
- Lieutenant-Colonel Thomas John Carey-Evans MC Indian Medical Service, Surgeon to His Excellency The Viceroy
- Alexander James Anderson CSI VD President, Chamber of Commerce, Rangoon, Burma
- Sardar Khan Bahadur Rustomji Jehangirji Vakil, Partner in several Spinning and Weaving Companies, and Member of the Board of Directors of other business concerns in Ahmedabad, Bombay
- Alfred Percival Symonds, Director, Messrs. Binny and Company Limited, Madras
- Mahamadbhai Currimbhai Ebrahim, Mill-owner and Philanthropist, Bombay
- M. R. Ry. Diwan Bahadur Raghupathi Venkataratnam Naidu Garu, Principal (retired) of the Raja's College, Pithapuram, Madras

Colonies, Protectorates, etc.

- John Ernest Adamson CMG Director of Education for the Province of Transvaal, Union of South Africa; in recognition of his services to Education
- Charles Ernest St. John Branch, Chief Justice of the Supreme Court of Jamaica
- Thomas Melrose Coombe, of the City of Perth, State of Western Australia, President of the Theatre Managers, Proprietors and Theatrical Association; in recognition of his public services
- Thomas Edward de Sampayo, Puisne Justice of the Supreme Court of Ceylon
- James Henry Gunson CMG CBE Mayor of the City of Auckland, New Zealand; in recognition of his public services
- Henry Edward Pollock KC Member of the Executive Council and Senior Unofficial Member of the Legislative Council of Hong Kong
- The Hon. William Alexander Sim, Judge of the Supreme Court of New Zealand
- John Sulman FRIBA of the City of Sydney, Chairman of the Canberra Advisory Committee; in recognition of his services to the Commonwealth of Australia
- Malcolm Watson of Klang, Selangor, Federated Malay States; in recognition of his services in connection with the prevention of Malaria

=== The Most Honourable Order of the Bath ===
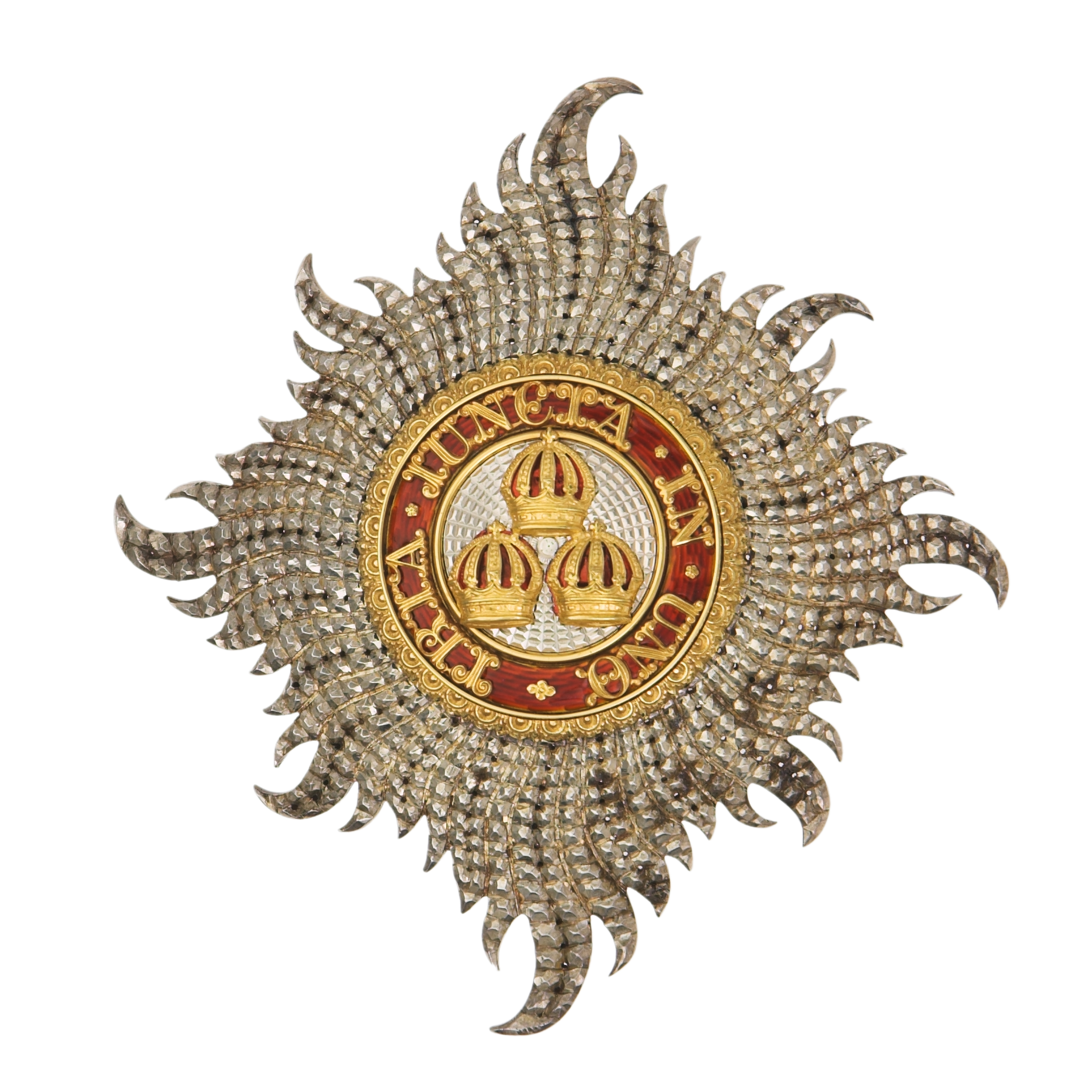
Civilian star of the Knight Grand Cross of the Order of the Bath

==== Knight Grand Cross of the Order of the Bath (GCB) ====
===== Military Division =====
Royal Navy

- Admiral Sir Montague Edward Browning GCMG KCB MVO
- Admiral Sir Hugh Evan-Thomas KCB KCMG MVO

Royal Air Force

- Air Vice Marshal Philip Woolcott Game CB DSO RAF

==== Knight Commander of the Order of the Bath (KCB) ====
===== Military Division =====
Royal Navy

- Vice-Admiral Allen Thomas Hunt CB CSI

Army

- Lieutenant-General the Hon. Sir Alan Richard Montagu Stuart Wortley KCMG CB DSO Quartermaster-General, Headquarters Staff of the Army in India
- Major-General the Hon. Sir Francis Richard Bingham KCMG CB late of the Military Inter-Allied Commission of Control, Berlin, now Lieutenant-Governor and Commanding the Troops, Jersey District

===== Civil Division =====
- Sir Archibald Henry Bodkin, Director of Public Prosecutions
- Sir Ernest Clark CBE Permanent Secretary, Ministry of Finance, Northern Ireland
- Otto Ernst Niemeyer CB Controller of Finance, His Majesty's Treasury.
- Horace John Wilson CB CBE Permanent Secretary, Ministry of Labour

==== Companion of the Order of the Bath (CB) ====
===== Military Division =====
Royal Navy

- Rear-Admiral Albert Percy Addison CMG
- Surgeon Rear-Admiral Charles Marsh Beadnell
- Captain Francis Herbert Mitchell DSO RN
- Captain Cecil Minet Staveley CMG RN

Army

- Colonel William Bernard Lauder CMG Royal Army Pay Corps, Chief Paymaster, The War Office, and Officer in charge of Royal Army Pay Corps Records
- Colonel Claud Edward Charles Graham Charlton CMG DSO Military Attaché, Washington
- Colonel Charles William Singer CMG DSO Chief Engineer, Egypt
- Colonel Stuart William Hughes Rawlins CMG DSO Commandant, Chemical Warfare Experimental Station, Porton
- Colonel Charles John Steavenson CMG late Brigade Commander, 1st Rhine Brigade
- Lieutenant-Colonel and Brevet Colonel Hugh Clifford Fernyhough CMG DSO Royal Army Ordnance Corps, Ordnance Officer, 2nd Class, Assistant Director of Ordnance Services, Northern Command
- Colonel Henry Arthur Peyton Lindsay CSI CMG CBE Indian Army, Inspector of Supplies and Transport, India
- Colonel Philip Frederick Pocock DSO Indian Army, Brigade Commander, 15th Indian Infantry Brigade
- Colonel John Patrick Villiers-Stuart DSO OBE Indian Army, General Staff Officer, 1st Grade, Staff College, Camberley
- Colonel Bernard Underwood Nicolay, Indian Army, Deputy Military Secretary, Headquarters Staff of the Army, India

Royal Air Force

- Group Captain Lyster Fettiplace Blandy DSO

===== Civil Division =====
- Engineer Rear-Admiral William Matthias Whayman GBE
- Paymaster Captain Richard Bosustow Hosking RN
- Colonel Godfrey Davenport Goodman CMG DSO VD TD late Brigade Commander, 139th (Sherwood Foresters), Infantry Brigade, Territorial Army
- Lieutenant-Colonel Edwin Wilfrid Stanyforth TD late Yorkshire Hussars Yeomanry, and Territorial Force Reserve
- Gerald Bain Canny, Commissioner of Inland Revenue
- Reginald Alexander Dalzell CBE Director of Telegraphs and Telephones, General Post Office
- Henry Augustus Ferguson-Davie, Principal Clerk of Public Bill Office and Clerk of the Fees, House of Commons
- Alfred Edward Faulkner CBE Director of Sea Transport, Board of Trade
- Ralph Endersby Harwood CVO CBE Deputy Treasurer to H.M. The King
- Norman Gerald Loughnane, Principal, Ministry of Pensions
- Alexander Maxwell, Assistant Secretary, Home Office
- John William Lambton Oliver CBE Director of Naval Stores, Admiralty
- Rowland Arthur Charles Sperling CMG His Majesty's Minister, Berne
- Leonard Day Wakely, Secretary, Political Department, India Office
- Charles Fell Watherston, Assistant Secretary and Actuary, War Office

=== Order of Merit (OM) ===
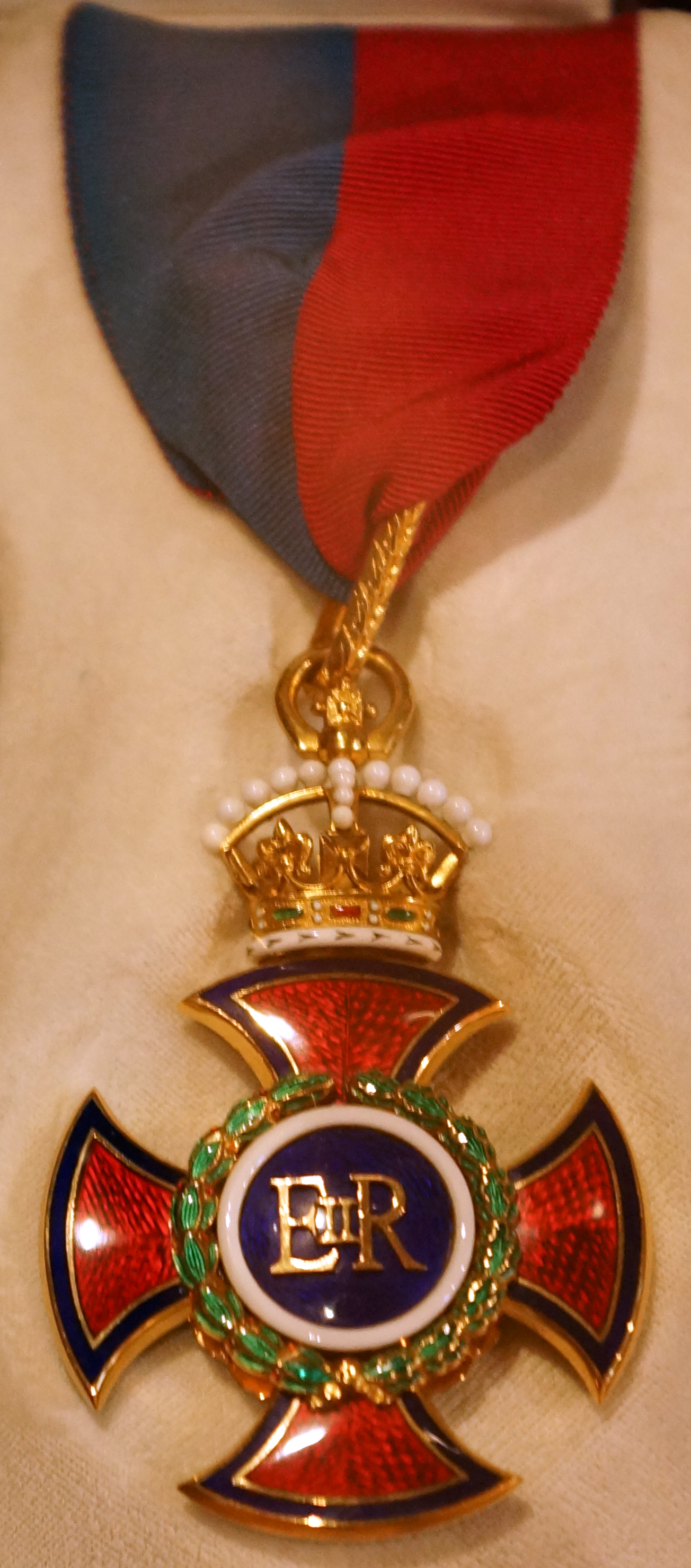
The riband and badge of the Order of Merit

- Francis Herbert Bradley, Fellow of Merton College, Oxford
- Sir Charles Scott Sherrington GBE PRS FRCP FRCS

=== The Most Exalted Order of the Star of India ===
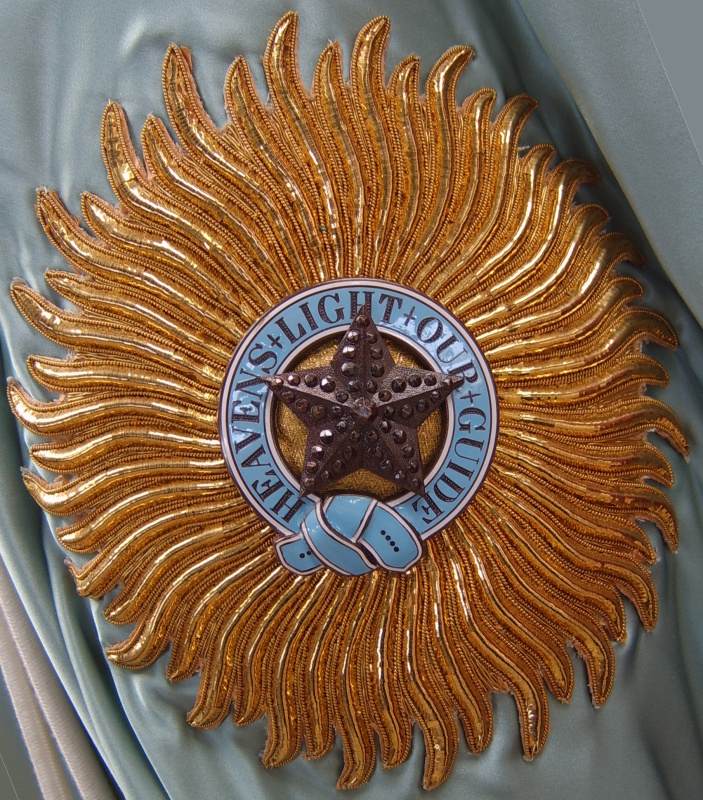
Star of a Knight Grand Commander of the Most Exalted Order of the Star of India

==== Knight Grand Commander (GCSI) ====
- Colonel His Highness Sewai Maharaj Shri Jey Singh GCIE KCSI Maharaja of Alwar, Rajputana
- James Lyle, Viscount Inchcape GCMG KCSI KCIE

==== Knight Commander (KCSI) ====
- His Highness Maharajadhiraja Maharao Sarup Ram Singh Bahadur, Maharao of Sirohi, Rajputana

==== Companion (CSI) ====
- Donald Hector Lees, Indian Civil Service, Member, Board of Revenue, Bengal
- Henry Phillips Tollinton CIE Indian Civil Service, Commissioner, Punjab
- Arthur Wyndham McNair OBE Indian Civil Service, Commissioner, Rohilkhand Division, United Provinces
- Frank Noyce CBE Indian Civil Service, Secretary to Government, Development Department, Madras
- William Sutherland VD Chief Engineer, Telegraphs
- Captain Edward James Headlam CMG DSO Director, Royal Indian Marine, Bombay
- Samuel Findlater Stewart CIE Secretary, Military Department, India Office, lately Joint Secretary to the Royal Commission on the Superior Civil Service in India

=== The Most Distinguished Order of Saint Michael and Saint George ===
Star of the Order of Saint Michael and Saint George

==== Knight Commander of the Order of St Michael and St George (KCMG) ====
- The Hon. Austin Chapman, Minister for Trade and Customs, Commonwealth of Australia
- Arthur Cuninghame Grant Duff, His Majesty's Envoy Extraordinary and Minister Plenipotentiary to the Republic of Chile
- Maximillian Michaelis, of the City of Cape Town; in recognition of services rendered to the Union of South Africa
- Herbert James Stanley CMG Governor and Commander-in-Chief of Northern Rhodesia

==== Companion of the Order of St Michael and St George (CMG) ====
- Bernard Henry Bourdillon, Secretary to the High Commissioner for Iraq
- Samuel George Campbell, of the City of Durban, Union of South Africa; in recognition of his public services
- George Edwin Emery, General Manager of the State Savings Bank, State of Victoria
- David Sampson Gideon, Member of the Privy Council and Member of the Legislative Council of Jamaica
- The Hon. William Muter Leggate, Minister of Lands and Agriculture of the Colony of Southern Rhodesia
- Alexander Francis Lowe, Clerk of Parliaments and Clerk of the Legislative-Council of New Zealand
- Ranald MacDonald OBE Comptroller of Customs, Nyasaland
- Hayes Marriott, General Adviser, Johore, Malay States
- George Henry Monahan, Clerk of the Senate of the Commonwealth of Australia
- James Watt, lately a Senior Resident the Southern Provinces of Nigeria
- George Augustus Mounsey OBE Counsellor in the Foreign Office

On the termination of the administrative functions of the British South Africa Company in Northern Rhodesia —

- Richard Allmond Jeffrey Goode CBE Chief Secretary to the Government, formerly Deputy Administrator and Secretary to the Administration, Northern Rhodesia
- Aylmer William May Principal Medical Officer, Northern Rhodesia

Honorary Companion

- Sanda Kura, the Shehu of Bornu, Nigeria
- Raja Abdul Aziz, the Raja Muda of Perak, Federated Malay States

=== The Most Eminent Order of the Indian Empire ===
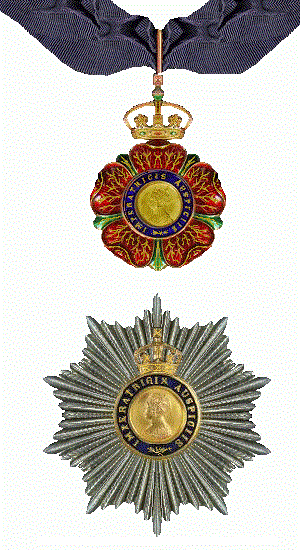
Riband, badge and star of the Knight Grand Commander of the Order of the Indian Empire

==== Knight Grand Commander (GCIE) ====
- His Highness Shri Rajaram Chhatrapati Maharaj, Maharaja of Kolhapur, Bombay

==== Knight Commander (KCIE) ====
- Sir Chimanlal Harilal Setalvad, ex-Member of Executive Council, Bombay
- Hugh McPherson CSI Indian Civil Service, Member of the Executive Council, Bihar and Orissa
- William James Reid CSI Indian Civil Service, Member of the Executive Council, Assam
- Sir Edward Maynard des Champs Chamier, Legal Adviser to the Secretary of State for India, lately President, Indian Bar Committee
- Khan Bahadur Sayyid Mehdi Shah CIE OBE Honorary Magistrate and President, Municipal Committee, Gojra, Lyallpur District, Punjab
- Khan Bahadur Sir Muhammad Habibullah, Sahib Bahadur CIE Member of the Executive Council, Madras

==== Companion (CIE) ====
- Wilfred Thomas Mermund Wright, Indian Civil Service, Joint Secretary to the Government of India in the Legislative Department
- Arthur Norman Moberly, Indian Civil Service, Officiating Chief Secretary to the Government of Bengal
- The Reverend Earle Monteith Macphail CBE Vice-Chancellor, University of Madras
- Lieutenant-Colonel Gordon Risley Hearn DSO Royal Engineers, Agent, Eastern Bengal Railway, Bengal
- Charles Evans William Jones, Indian Educational Service, Director of Public Instruction and Secretary to the Government of the Central Provinces
- Colonel Richard Heard, Indian Medical Service, Honorary Surgeon to His Majesty the King, Surgeon-General with the Government of Bengal
- Upendralal Majumdar, late Accountant-General
- Philip Edward Percival, Indian Civil Service, District and Sessions Judge, Bombay, and Member, Indian Legislative Assembly
- Loftus Otway Clarke, Indian Civil Service, Political Agent in Manipur, Assam
- Kenneth Neville Knox, Indian Civil Service, Collector of Allahabad, United Provinces
- Eric Conran Smith, Indian Civil Service, Private Secretary to His Excellency the Governor of Madras
- Major George Cumine Strahan Black MVO OBE Private Secretary to His Excellency the Governor of the Punjab
- Mirza Mohamed Ismail, Private Secretary to His Highness the Maharaja of Mysore
- John Murray Ewart, Superintendent of Police, in charge Intelligence Bureau and CID., Peshawar, North-West Frontier Province
- Raj Bahadur Taruck Nath Sadhu, Public Prosecutor, Bengal
- William James Lister OBE Honorary Treasurer of the Red Cross Society, Punjab
- Bhupatiraju Venkatapatiraju Garu, Member of the Legislative Assembly
- Frederick Clayton, Partner in Messrs. Fleming, Shaw and Company, Bombay
- Diwan Bahadur Shrinivas Konhar Rodda, President of the District Local Board of Dharwar, Bombay
- Frederick Young, Assistant Superintendent of Police, United Provinces
- Raj Bahadur Gobind Lai Sijuar, Gayawal, Bihar and Orissa
- Francis Foster Goodliffe, Merchant, Rangoon, Burma
- Khan Bahadur Sardar Asghar Ali, Manager of a Book Bureau for Indian Soldiers, Punjab
- Arthur William Street, Principal, Ministry of Agriculture and Fisheries, lately Joint Secretary to the Royal Commission on the Superior Civil Services in India

=== The Royal Victorian Order ===
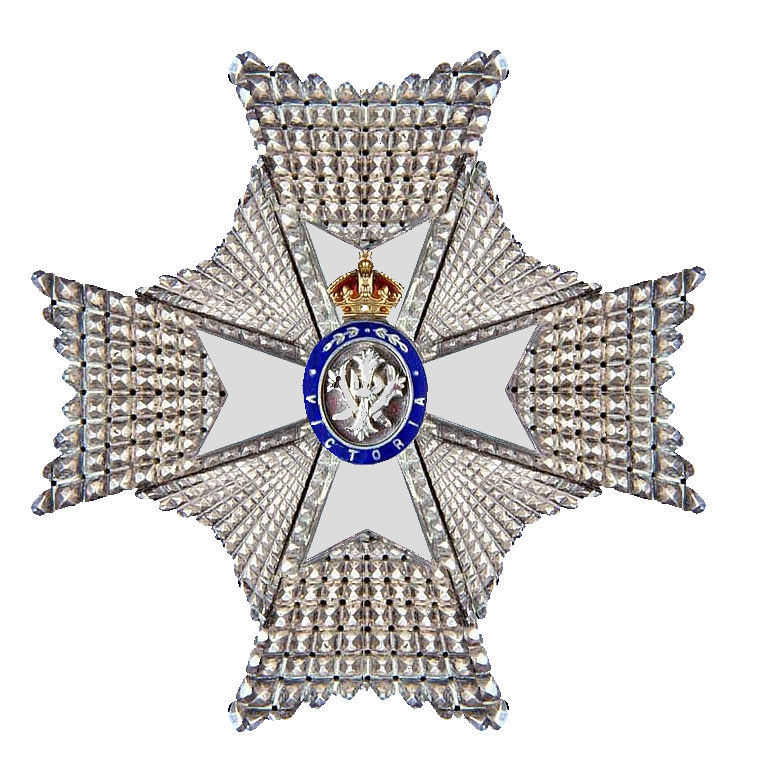
Insignia of a Knight / Dames Commander of the Royal Victorian Order

==== Knight Grand Cross of the Royal Victorian Order (GCVO) ====
- His Royal Highness The Prince George KG

==== Knight Commander of the Royal Victorian Order (KCVO) ====
- Colonel The Hon. George Arthur Charles Crichton CVO
- Lieutenant-Colonel Sir Arthur Leetham CMG
- Walter Peacock CVO
- William Fairbank CVO OBE

==== Commander of the Royal Victorian Order (CVO) ====
- Major The Hon. Caryl Arthur James Annesley
- Harry Robert Boyd CBE
- Herbert Edward Mitchell MVO

==== Member of the Royal Victorian Order, 4th class (MVO) ====
- Major Norman Henry Prendergast DSO
- Captain Daniel Hickey MVO (Fifth Class). (Dated 29 May 1924)
- George Edward Miles MVO (Fifth Class)
- Charles John Dalrymple-Hay
- Arthur Gabriel Morrish

==== Member of the Royal Victorian Order, 5th class (MVO) ====
- Thomas McEwen OBE
- Lieutenant Rudolf Peter O'Donnell RM Director of Music

=== The Most Excellent Order of the British Empire ===
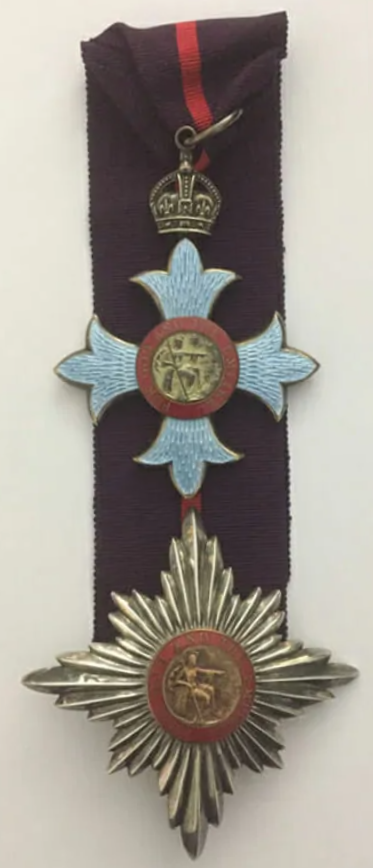
Knight Commander of the Order of the British Empire, insignia 1917–35

==== Dame Grand Cross of the Order of the British Empire (GBE) ====
- Marie Adelaide, Baroness Willingdon CI DBE

==== Knight Grand Cross of the Order of the British Empire (GBE) ====
===== Military Division =====
- Admiral Sir Alexander Ludovic Duff KCB KCVO

===== Civil Division =====
- Field-Marshal Herbert Charles Onslow, Baron Plumer GCB GCMG GCVO Governor and Commander-in-Chief of the Island of Malta
- Robert Donald For public services. Chairman of the Council of the Empire Press Union
- Sir Howard George Frank Bt KCB lately Chairman of the Disposal and Liquidation Commission. For public services.
- Sir Josiah Charles Stamp KBE FSS For public services

Diplomatic Service and Overseas List

- Sir Mansfeldt de Cardonnel Findlay KCMG CB lately His Majesty's Minister at Christiania

==== Dame Commander of the Order of the British Empire (DBE) ====
- Henrietta Octavia Weston Barnett CBE For public services
- Janet Mary Campbell MS Senior Medical Officer for Maternity and Child Welfare, Ministry of Health, and Chief Woman Medical Adviser, Board of Education
- Her Highness the Rani Shiv Kunwar Sahiba, Senior Rani and Rani-Regent of Narsinghgarh, Central India

==== Knight Commander of the Order of the British Empire (KBE) ====
===== Military Division =====
Royal Navy

- Admiral William Hannam Henderson

Army

- Major-General Thomas Owen Marden CB CMG
- Colonel Berkeley Vincent CB CMG

===== Civil Division =====
- Major-General Wilfred William Ogilvy Beveridge CB CBE DSO (retired pay)
- John Arthur Corcoran CB Assistant Under Secretary of State for War and Director of Army Contracts
- William Vibart Dixon OBE late Deputy Chief Clerk of the West Riding of Yorkshire County Council
- Sir John Lindsay, Town Clerk of Glasgow. For public services.
- Charles Henry Lawrence Neish CB Registrar of the Privy Council
- James William Olive CBE Deputy Commissioner of Metropolitan Police
- Sir Henry Strakosch. For public services.

Diplomatic Service and Overseas List

- Charles Bell Child Clipperton CMG Inspector General of Consulates
- Ernest Macleod Dowson OBE Financial Adviser in Cairo since 1920
- Lieutenant-Colonel Francis Henry Humphrys CIE Indian Army
- Malcolm Arnold Robertson CMG His Majesty's Minister at Tangier

Colonies, Protectorates, etc.

- John Middleton CMG Governor and Commander-in-Chief of the Colony of the Falkland Islands
- William George Maxwell CMG Chief Secretary to the Government, Federated Malay States
- Sir Mark Sheldon, of the City of Sydney; in recognition of his services to the Commonwealth of Australia
- George Adlington Syme recognition of his services to the State of Victoria
- Theodoras Gustaff Truter CMG Chief Commissioner of Police, Union of South Africa

==== Commander of the Order of the British Empire (CBE) ====
===== Military Division =====
Royal Navy

- Engineer Rear-Admiral Frederick William Marshall
- Paymaster Captain Alfred Charles Ransom
- Commander Guybon Chesney Castell Damant OBE (retired)
- Major and Brevet Lieutenant-Colonel Robert Daly Ormsby RM (1879–1946)
- Captain Francis Richard Henry Penn, Viscount Curzon VD RNVR MP

Army

- Lieutenant-Colonel Ernest Francis William Barker DSO Royal Corps of Signals
- Major and Brevet Lieutenant-Colonel Frank Passy Dunlop DSO The Worcestershire Regiment
- Lieutenant-Colonel Sinclair Gair OBE DCM TD 6th Battalion (Territorial), The Seaforth Highlanders
- Lieutenant-Colonel and Brevet Colonel (temporary Colonel) James Crawford Kennedy Royal Army Medical Corps
- Major and Brevet Lieutenant-Colonel Alfred Owen Needham OBE MC 7th Battalion (Territorial), The Lancashire Fusiliers
- Colonel Cecil Charles Palmer
- Major and Brevet Lieutenant-Colonel Charles Westrope Selby DSO MC Royal Artillery
- Margaret Steenson RRC Matron, Queen Alexandra's Imperial Military Nursing Service
- Major-General Herbert Fothergill Cooke CB CSI DSO Indian Army
- Colonel David Campbell Crombie, Indian Army
- Colonel Francis Bede Heritage MVO Commandant, Royal Military College of Australia, Duntroon
- Captain John Malet Llewellyn, The Devonshire Regiment and 3rd Battalion The King's African Rifles; Officer Commanding Troops, Kenya Colony

Royal Air Force

- Air Commodore John Glanville Hearson CB DSO

In recognition of the valuable sendees rendered in the recent successful seaplane flight round Australia —

- Wing Commander Stanley James Goble DSO OBE DFC Royal Australian Air Force
- Flight Lieutenant Ivor Ewing Mclntyre AFC Royal Australian Air Force

===== Civil Division =====
- Ernest Edwin Beare, Secretary to the Government Hospitality Fund
- Alderman Charles Hayward Bird, Chairman of the Cardiff Local Employment Committee
- Captain Donald Bremner, Assistant Commissioner, City of London Police
- Charles Herbert Bressey OBE Chief Engineer, Roads Department, Ministry of Transport
- Herbert Edward Burgess, Senior Official Receiver
- Professor Edward Provan Cathcart Professor of Chemical Physiology, Glasgow University. For public services.
- Arthur James Dawson OBE Director of Education, Durham
- Robert Browne Dunwoody OBE Secretary, Association of British Chambers of Commerce
- Joseph Farndale OBE Chief Constable, Bradford
- Joseph Jessop Farrell, Deputy Chief Inspector of Taxes, Board of Inland Revenue
- Marjory Kennedy-Fraser, In recognition of her contributions to folk music
- Ernest John Harrington OBE Deputy Accountant General, General Post Office
- Mary Verona Campbell Hay, Chairman and Founder of Queen Alexandra Hospital Home, Roehampton
- Lieutenant-Colonel Cyril Emmerson Hughes, Deputy Director of Works, Gallipoli, Imperial War Graves Commission
- Arthur Herbert Ley CIE Indian Civil Service, Controller of Sales in India under the Disposal and Liquidation Commission
- Ernest Alan Lidbury, Assistant Secretary, Board of Customs and Excise
- Henry Willoughby Lowell, Marshal of the Admiralty and Prize Court, Royal Courts of Justice
- Kenneth Lyon OBE Principal Private Secretary to Secretary of State, for War
- James Dalgleish Kellie-MacCallum OBE Chief Constable of Northamptonshire
- Captain Jasper Graham Mayne OBE Secretary, Army Rifle Association
- Harry Ekermans Oakley OBE MInstCE Deputy Director of Works and Buildings, Air Ministry
- Charles Reed Peers, Chief Inspector of Ancient Monuments
- William Christopher Dowling Prendergast In recognition of his services in combating lead poisoning
- William Dalgleish Scott Assistant Secretary, Ministry of Finance, Northern Ireland
- Harry Smith, Chief Inspector, Employment and Insurance Department, Ministry of Labour
- Major Herbert Eames Spencer OBE Director of Passport Control Office, Foreign Office
- The Reverend Canon Norman Sprankling, formerly Chairman of the Metropolitan Asylums Board
- Reginald Townsend, Chief Superintendent of Ordnance Factories, War Office
- Lieutenant-Colonel Thomas Turnbull JP DL Alderman of the City of Manchester, Chairman of Manchester and District War Pensions Committee
- Arthur Joseph Wall OBE Secretary to the Prison Commissioners for England and Wales
- Lieutenant-Colonel Herbert Lawton Warden DSO Regional Director for Scotland, Ministry of Pensions
- Walter Aldington Willis, Member of the Panel of Chairmen for Boards of Arbitration under Industrial Courts Act, 1919
- Walter Baldwyn Yates, Crown Umpire for Unemployment Insurance

Diplomatic Service and Overseas List

- George Percy Churchill, lately Oriental Secretary to His Majesty's Legation at Tehran
- George Alexander Combe, Acting Consul General at Cheng-tu
- Lionel Stanley Hargreaves, Custodian of Enemy Property in Egypt
- George Pearson Paton, Assistant Commercial Agent at Vladivostok
- Robert Wilberforce, Director of the British Library of Information, New York

Colonies, Protectorates, etc.

- William Henry Barkley, Collector of Customs, Commonwealth of Australia
- Lieutenant-Colonel Percy Neville Buckley, formerly Military Adviser to the High Commissioner in London for the Commonwealth of Australia
- Donald George Clark OBE Commissioner of Taxes, New Zealand
- William Lance Conlay, Commissioner of Police, Federated Malay States
- George Frederick Copus, Finance Officer in the Office of the High Commissioner in London for New Zealand
- Herbert Ferguson, Colonial Secretary and Registrar-General, Windward Islands
- George Ball Greene, Assistant Colonial Secretary of the Colony of British Guiana
- Roger Greene, Secretary to. the High Commissioner for the Western Pacific
- Musa Irfan Bey, Member of the Executive and Legislative Councils of the Island of Cyprus
- Bertram Nicholson DSO MC Deputy Resident Commissioner and Government Secretary, Swaziland, South Africa
- Ryton Campbell Oldham, Chief Electoral Officer of the Commonwealth of Australia
- Herbert Richmond Palmer CMG Resident of the Province of Bornu, Northern Provinces, Nigeria, in recognition of specially valuable services recently rendered to the Government of Nigeria.
- William Henry Poultney; in recognition of his public services to the Union of South Africa.
- John Ramsay, of Launceston, State of Tasmania; in recognition of his public services
- Lieutenant-Colonel Joseph Ramsay Tainsh VD Director of Railways, Iraq

British India

- Lieutenant-Colonel Charles Gilbert Crosthwaite OBE Deputy Commissioner, Peshawar, North-West Frontier Province
- Lieutenant-Colonel Frederick Grattan Moore (Assistant Secretary in the Army Department), late Secretary to the Soldiers Board
- Alexander Warren Mercer, Deputy Inspector-General of Police, Punjab
- Vasantrao Anandrao Dabholkar OBE Member of Legislative Council, Bombay
- Margaret Ida Balfour Joint Secretary of the Dufferin Fund
- Doctor San C. Po, Medical Practitioner and Municipal Commissioner, Bassein, Burma

On the termination of the administrative functions of the British South Africa Company in Southern Rhodesia and in Northern Rhodesia —

- Colonel Algernon Essex Capell DSO Commissioner, British South Africa Police, Southern Rhodesia
- Alfred Milroy Fleming CMG Medical Director, Southern Rhodesia, and Principal Medical Officer, British South Africa Police, and formerly Member of the Legislative Council, Southern Rhodesia
- Colonel Harry March Stennett DSO Commandant of the Northern Rhodesia Police

==== Officer of the Order of the British Empire (OBE) ====
===== Military Division =====
Royal Navy

- Paymaster Commander Oswald Carter
- Surgeon Commander Robert William Basil Hall
- Engineer Commander Frank Moorison
- Commander Henry Richard Sawbridge
- Commander Charles Geoffrey Coleridge Sumner
- Paymaster Commander Harold Vincent Such

Army

- Quartermaster and Major James Betts DSO Extra Regimentally Employed List
- Captain Percy Kenneth Boulnois MC Royal Engineers
- Lieutenant-Colonel George Charles Knight Clowes DSO TD 14th London Regiment, Territorial Army
- Lieutenant-Colonel Thomas Jenkins David DSO TD 81st (Welsh) Brigade, Royal Field Artillery, Territorial Army
- Major and Brevet Lieutenant-Colonel Malcolm Gordon Douglas DSO MC Honourable Artillery Company, Territorial Army
- Major Frank Lucas Netlam Giles DSO Royal Engineers
- Captain John Bagot Glubb MC Royal Engineers
- Major Boland Hamilton, Royal Engineers
- Major and Brevet Lieutenant-Colonel Ernest Hewlett CMG DSO The Devonshire Regiment
- Lieutenant-Colonel Horace Musgrave Hewison MC TD The Argyll and Sutherland Highlanders
- Major Harold Crossley Hildreth DSO FRCS Royal Army Medical Corps
- Major Nelson Low DSO Royal Army Medical Corps
- Major and Brevet Lieutenant-Colonel Gordon Ponsonby MacClellan DSO Royal-Artillery, late Royal Garrison Artillery
- Captain George Sims Marshall MBE 9th Battalion (Territorial) The Durham Light Infantry
- Lieutenant-Colonel Walter Pepys DSO The Warwickshire Yeomanry, Territorial Army
- Major Frederick Emilius Roberts DSO Royal Army Medical Corps
- Lieutenant-Colonel Henry Gordon Roberts TD 4th Battalion (Territorial), The Prince of Wales's Volunteers
- Captain Bernal John Eyan MC 56th (1st London) Divisional Engineers, Royal Engineers, Territorial Army
- Temp. Major Reginald Ernest Sanders DSO Royal Army Service Corps
- Major Philip Achilles Kingston Townshend, The Royal Berkshire Regiment
- Lieutenant-Colonel Francis Tyrwhitt Drake Wilson, 1st Battalion, The Suffolk Regiment
- Quartermaster and Major Harry Evans Worthing DCM 2nd Battalion, The Rifle Brigade
- Captain Angus Rankin Campbell, Indian Army Reserve of Officers, attached Indian Army Service Corps
- Captain Wallace Adelbert Lyon, 12th Frontier Force Regiment, Indian Army
- Captain Eugene Daniel McCarthy, 10th Baluch Regiment, Indian Army
- Captain Henry William Frederick McCleery, 12th Cavalry (Frontier Force), Indian Army
- Captain Reginald Vivian Robinson, Indian Army Reserve of Officers, attached Indian Army Service Corps
- Captain Arthur Lionel Rogers, Indian Army Beserve of Officers
- Major Donald Brackenbury Ross, 14th Punjab Regiment, Indian Army
- Lieutenant-Colonel Mervyn Robert Howe Webber, 1st Duke of York's Own Skinner's Horse, Indian Army
- Major Arthur Newell Ogilvie, The North Staffordshire Regiment, later Commanding Sierra Leone Battalion, West African Frontier Force

Royal Air Force

- Squadron Leader Charles Hubert Boulby Blount MC
- Flight Lieutenant Maurice Moore
- Flight Lieutenant Gerald Momington Bryer AFC
- Captain John Holthouse, South African Air Force

===== Civil Division =====
- George Bruce, Chief Constable of Dunfermline
- Major John Scoular Buchanan, Senior Assistant, Directorate of Research, Air Ministry
- Lieutenant-Colonel Alan George Chichester DL Chief Constable of Huntingdonshire
- Charles William Dixon MBE Principal, Colonial Office
- William Dobson, Governor of His Majesty's Prison, Bedford
- Captain Charles Howard Ensor, County Commandant, Ulster Special Constabulary
- Arthur Ernest Evans MBE JP DL Chairman, Wrexham Local Employment Committee
- George Thomas Fidler MBE Accountant, Ministry of Finance, Northern Ireland
- Charles Lavington Fielder MBE Chief Surveyor of Lands, Civil Engineer in Chief's Department, Admiralty
- James Forbes MBE Superintending Inspector, Board of Customs and Excise
- John Gaskell, Chief Clerk, Bow Street Police Court
- Charles William Grant Principal Officer, Ministry of Home Affairs, Northern Ireland
- Alderman William Groves JP Chairman, Stepney Local Employment Committee
- James Ernest Hagger, Controller of Statistical Department, Board of Customs and Excise
- William, Baker Hartridge, For services to Disposal and Liquidation Commission
- Councillor Alfred William Haynes JP Chairman of the Swindon, Chippenham and District War Pensions Committee
- Edward Holmes, Chief Constable of Leicestershire
- Ebenezer Howard JP President of the International Garden Cities and Town Planning Federation
- William Stephens Hughes, Chief Constable of the City of Lincoln
- Major Edgar Mortimore Lafone, Chief Constable, Metropolitan Police
- The Reverend Oanon Frederick Charles Macdonald Chairman, West Hartlepool Local Employment Committee
- Jean Adolphe Mauger, Acting Chief Clerk, War Compensation Court
- Charles William Hayley Mason, Superintending Valuer, Board of Inland Revenue
- Robert Lee Matthews; MBE Chief Constable of Leeds
- Captain George Tyrrell McCaw Civil Assistant in Geographical Section, General Staff, War Office
- William James McGaw, Inspector,0 Ministry of Agriculture, Northern Ireland
- Gertrude McKinnell, Voluntary Worker, Northampton and District War Pensions Committee
- Robert Lindsay Megarry, Principal, Air Ministry
- Alfred Sargent, Inspector of Merrifield, Taxes, Board of Senior Inland Revenue
- John Morran, Chief Constable of Roxburgh, Berwick and Selkirk
- William Sneyd Moore, County Inspector, Royal Ulster Constabulary
- Arthur Frederick Nicholson, Chief Constable of Exeter
- Captain John Scott Parker, Chief Horticultural Officer, Imperial War Graves Commission
- William Phillips, Chairman, Pontypridd Local Employment Committee
- Otto Schiff MBE For public services
- John Stuart Scrimgeour For services to Disposal and Liquidation Commission
- Leslie Robert Sherwood, Senior Establishment and Accounts Officer, Foreign Office
- Frederick Bertram Sutherland, Principal, Ministry of Labour
- The Reverend David John Thomas JP Chairman, Wood Green Local Employment Committee
- Nathan Thompson ISO MBE Inspector-General of Waterguard, Board of Customs and Excise
- Alderman Alfred George Turley, Chairman, West Bromwich Local Employment Committee
- James Arthur Wilson MBE Chief Constable of Cardiff
- James Yates, Principal Officer, Ministry of Education, Northern Ireland

Diplomatic Service and Overseas List

- Henry Allan Fairfax Best Archer, Acting Consul at Chung King
- Shirley Clifford Atchley, Local First Secretary at His Majesty's Legation at Athens
- Charles Frederick Albert Bristow, Superintending Archivist at His Majesty's Legation, Buenos Aires
- The Reverend James Chambers, Chaplain at the English Church, Amsterdam
- Walter Everard Fuller MBE Superintendent Archivist at Paris
- Alexander Knox Helm, Third Dragoman at His Majesty's Embassy, Constantinople
- Charles Richard Lias, Head Master of Victoria College, Alexandria
- Arthur Law Mathewson, Vice Consul at Medan, Sumatra
- George Frederick Steward, Press Officer at His Majesty's Embassy, Brussels
- William John Hamilton Taylor, His Majesty's Vice Consul at Key West

Colonies, Protectorates, etc.

- Ernest Adams, Comptroller of Customs and Custodian of Enemy Property, Tanganyika Territory
- Kitoyi Ajasa, Unofficial Member of the Legislative Council, Nigeria
- Charles Edward Woolhouse Bannerman, Police Magistrate, Gold Coast
- Lieutenant-Colonel Edward Bell MBE Chief Inspector of Police, Leeward Islands
- Captain Walter Henry Calthrop Calthrop RN (retired), Master Attendant, Straits Settlements
- Stanley York Rales MBE Custodian of Enemy Property, Union of South Africa
- Harington Gordon Forbes, lately Secretary of the British North Borneo Company
- James Alfred Galizia, Superintendent of the-Public Works Department, Island of Malta
- Charles Herbert Hamilton, of the Office of the General Manager of Railways, Union of South Africa
- Lieutenant-Colonel Melville David Harrel, Inspector-General of Police and Commandant of the Local Forces, Barbados
- George Jeffery, Curator of Ancient Monuments, Island of Cyprus
- Harry Leslie Knaggs, Assistant Colonial Secretary and Clerk of the Executive Council of the Colony of Trinidad and Tobago
- George Lyall MBE lately Senior Assistant Secretary, Uganda Protectorate
- Daniel James Oman, Director of Education, Gold Coast
- James Russell Orr, Director of Education, Kenya Colony
- Cyril Francis Reading, Sub-District Governor of Tulkeram, Palestine
- François Auguste Rouget Medical Superintendent of the Civil Hospital, Mauritius
- George Ritchie Sandford, Assistant Secretary in the Secretariat, and Clerk to the Executive and Legislative Councils, Kenya Colony
- Alfred James Shorunkeh Sawyer, Unofficial Member of the Legislative Council, Sierra Leone
- William Frederick Wainwright, District Commandant of Police, Southern District, Palestine
- Alexander Harold White, in charge of the British Section of the Anglo-Belgian Boundary Commission, Tanganyika Territory

British India

- Elsai Odgers, Madras
- Conrad Allan Cooke VD Chief Engineer, Bombay, Baroda and Central India Railway, Ajmer-Merwara
- Rama Shankar Bajpai, Assistant Director of Public Information with the Government of India
- David Burnett Meek, Director of Industries, Bengal
- Major John William Thomson-Glover, Indian Army, Political Agent, Wana, North-West Frontier Province
- Arthur Congreve Miller, Educational Inspector, on special duty as Provincial Secretary, Boy Scouts Council, Bombay
- Frederick Walford, Principal, Bihar School of Engineering, Bihar and Orissa
- Frederick H. Andrews, late Principal, Amar Singh Technical Institute, Srinagar, Kashmir
- Henry Martin, Principal, Islamia College, Peshawar, North-West Frontier Province
- Khan Bahadur Mahbub Mian Imam Baksh Kadri, Bombay Civil Service, Joint Judge and Additional Sessions Judge, Ahmedabad, Bombay
- Basil Martin Sullivan, Consulting Architect to Government, Punjab
- Raj Bahadur Shyam Narain Singh MBE an official Member of the Legislative Assembly
- Rustom Rustomjee
- William Teague Everali, Indian State Railways

On the termination of the administrative functions of the British South Africa Company in Southern Rhodesia and in Northern Rhodesia —

- Percy Johnstone Baird, Chief Accountant, London Office, British South Africa Company
- Edmund Noel Carlton, Assistant Secretary to the Government, and Clerk of the Executive Legislative Councils, Northern Rhodesia
- Gerard Duncombe Clough, Attorney-General, formerly Legal Adviser and Public Prosecutor, Northern Rhodesia
- Claude Hatherley Dobree, Treasurer, Northern Rhodesia
- Walter Musgrave Raton Assistant Medical Director and Medical Superintendent, Ingutsheni Mental Hospital, Bulawayo, Southern Rhodesia
- Lancelot Middleton Foggin, Director of Education, Southern Rhodesia
- Hugh Morrison Gower Jackson, Superintendent of Natives, Southern Rhodesia
- Arthur Percy Millar, Secretary, London Office, British South Africa Company

Honorary Officers

- Amin Rizk, an Officer of the Land Department, Palestine

==== Member of the Order of the British Empire (MBE) ====
===== Military Division =====
Royal Navy

Army

- Lieutenant Frank William Allbones, 1st Battalion, The Lincolnshire Regiment
- Regimental Sergeant-Major Randolph Beard DCM MM 2nd Battalion, Grenadier Guards
- Company Sergeant-Major Harry Beaumont, 6th Battalion (Territorial), The East Surrey Regiment
- Regimental Sergeant-Major Ernest Daniel Britton DCM 3rd Battalion, Coldstream Guards
- Quartermaster and Captain William Bromage, Royal Army Service Corps
- Deputy Commissary of Ordnance and Captain William Henry Bunt, Royal Army Ordnance Corps
- Lieutenant George Henry Curtis Dale, Army Educational Corps
- Lieutenant William Charles Palliser Dawson, Royal Tank Corps
- Captain David Sextus Percy Douglas, 51st (Highland) Divisional Signals, Royal Corps of Signals, Territorial Army
- Regimental Sergeant-Major Thomas Elliott, The Royal Scots Greys
- Captain George Edmund Framingham MC The Royal Warwickshire Regiment
- Lieutenant William Raphael Gatt, Royal Malta Artillery, Adjutant, King's Own Malta Regiment
- Lieutenant Robert Samuel Gearing, Army Educational Corps
- Lieutenant Laurence Douglas Grand, Royal Engineers
- Regimental Sergeant-Major Cecil Harradine DCM 1st Battalion, Irish Guards
- Quartermaster and Captain Charles James Haven, The Scottish Horse, Territorial Army
- Quartermaster and Lieutenant Ernest Fred Hayball, 2nd Battalion, Highland Light Infantry
- Company Sergeant-Major Charles Frederick Hayman DCM 1st Battalion, Coldstream Guards
- Quartermaster and Lieutenant Frank Huband MC DCM 1st Battalion, The North Staffordshire Regiment
- Superintending Clerk Ernest Alexander Lewis, Royal Engineers
- Regimental Sergeant-Major Henry James Martin, 1st Battalion, East Kent Regiment
- Quartermaster and Captain Evelyn Harold Pearcey, Royal Engineers
- Major Reginald Clare Periton, 7th Battalion (Territorial) The King's Regiment
- Quartermaster and Lieutenant Archibald George Porters MC Extra Regimentally Employed List
- Quartermaster and Captain James Robert Robinson TD 5th Battalion. (Territorial), The Durham Light Infantry
- Staff Quartermaster-Sergeant George Arthur Seymour, Royal Army Service Corps
- Regimental Quartermaster-Sergeant William Soughton DCM 2nd Battalion, The Royal Sussex Regiment
- Captain Arthur Troops (Retired Pay), Regular Army Reserve of Officers, The Sherwood Foresters, employed Recruiting Duties
- Lieutenant (D.O.) Francis George Young, Royal Artillery
- Subadar Bara Singh, 120th (Ambala) Pack Battery, Artillery, Indian Army
- Lieutenant Edwin Borton, Indian Army Reserve of Officers, attached Indian Army Service Corps
- Captain William Walter Brindley, 10th Baluch Regiment, Indian Army
- Conductor Alfred Edward Ellis, India Miscellaneous List
- Lieutenant Leonard Arthur Goddard, Indian Army Reserve of Officers
- Captain Gordon Saffery Johnson MC 1st Madras Pioneers, Indian Army
- Deputy Commissary and Captain Harry Joyner, India Miscellaneous List
- Assistant Commissary and Lieutenant James Leonard Kenny, India Miscellaneous List
- Subadar Nur Ali, 1/13th Frontier Force Bales, Indian Army
- Jemadar Painda Khan (II), IDSM Indian Army Service Corps
- Deputy Commissary and Captain Ralph Wright, Indian Army Service Corps

Royal Air Force

- Flying Officer Robert Samuel Bruce
- Flying Officer Ernest Whittlesea
- Observer Officer Kenneth Cordell McKenzie
- Sergeant-Major Class I Richard Eric Gorwood

===== Civil Division =====
- Wilfred Herbert Brattle, Assistant Accountant, War Office
- Charles Bastable, Late Superintendent, O. Division, Metropolitan Police
- Harold Edmund Bell, Secretary, Anglo-Egyptian War Cemeteries Executive Committee
- Barbara Margaret Best, Junior Administrative Assistant, Foreign Office
- Wallace Broad, Manager, Edgware Road Employment Exchange
- G. R. Coghlin, Head of Separation Section, Disposal and Liquidation Commission
- Cecil Courtice, Head of Alien Visa Section, Passport Office, Foreign Office
- Inspector John Brodie Craib, Ayr Burgh Constabulary
- Minnie Crocker, Higher Clerical Officer, Ministry of Pensions
- Allen Patrick Cunningham, Higher Clerical Officer, War Office
- Henry Dyer, Staff Clerk, Board of Inland Revenue
- Captain William Henderson Fyffe, District Commandant, Royal Ulster Constabulary
- Superintendent Shadrack Garrett, Bournemouth Division, Hampshire Constabulary
- Chief Superintendent P. Gregson, Lancashire Constabulary
- Herbert Gosling, Manager, Dundee Employment Exchange
- Edward James Lambert Hall, Clerk to the Lord Chief Justice
- George Hall, District Inspector, Royal Ulster Constabulary
- Major William Thomas Hanson, Chief Clerk to Assistant Director of Ordnance Service (Provision), War Office
- Albert Edward Harrison, Manager, Leeds Employment Exchange
- Thomas James Harman, Staff Clerk, War Office
- Amos Hayes, Assistant Clerk, General Superintendent's Office, Military Department, L.M. & S. Railway
- William Angus Boyd Iliff, Superintending Officer, Ministry of Labour, Northern Ireland
- John James, Staff Clerk, Board of Inland Revenue
- Arthur Richard Jeffrey, Member, East Ham and Barking War Pensions Committee
- Robert Johnson, Officer, Board of Customs and Excise
- Albert Edward Lines, Ex-soldier Clerk, War Office
- Captain Henry Edward Maskew, Transport Officer, France, Imperial War Graves Commission
- George Roland McConnell, Higher Executive Officer, Ministry of Commerce, Northern Ireland
- Superintendent James Arthur McCoy, Liverpool Constabulary
- Superintendent Donald McLennan, Deputy Chief Constable of Renfrewshire
- Septimus Richard Medwin, Higher Clerical Officer, Board of Customs and Excise
- Superintendent Charles Frederick Melville, Whitehaven Division, Cumberland Constabulary
- Annie Norman, Junior Administrative Assistant, Foreign Office
- Gwendoline Evelyn Mary O'Rorke, Voluntary Worker, St. Pancras & Hampstead War Pensions Committee
- Evan Ortner, Superintendent of the Technical Schools, Woolwich Arsenal
- James Patient, Inspector in Office of Director of Stamping, Board of Inland Revenue
- Superintendent Frederick Petty, Bradford Constabulary
- William Booth Potts, Manager, Liverpool Employment Exchange
- Thomas Reuben Reynolds, for Services to Disposal and Liquidation Commission
- C. Sammut, Pensioner Clerk, War Office
- Walter Robert Shipway, Staff Clerk, Colonial Office
- Annie Simonds, Vice-Chairman, Bradford, Shipley and District War Pensions Committee
- Superintendent Ralph John Smith, Deputy Chief Constable and Chief Clerk, Nottinghamshire Constabulary
- Commander William Henry St. Ledger, Commander of Revenue Cutter Vigilant
- Fred Tanner, Accountant Royal Military College, Sandhurst
- Hugh Elkin Thompson, District Commandant, Ulster Special Constabulary
- Percy Wanbridge, Member of Taunton, Yeovil and District War Pensions Committee
- Colonel Henry Waring, Area Commandant, Ulster Special Constabulary
- Constance May Whitmore, Voluntary Worker, Birmingham and District War Pensions Committee
- Ronald McKinnon Wood AMInstCE Principal Technical Assistant, Royal Air Craft Establishment, Farnborough
- Dallas Hales Wilkie Young, Clerk, Admiralty Marshal's Office
- Superintendent Edward Young, Deputy Chief Constable, Somersetshire Constabulary

Diplomatic Service and Overseas List

- Henry William Burnett, His Majesty's Vice Consul at Maldonado, Uruguay
- Paul Cassar, Pro-Consul at Alexandria
- Francis Alexander Chambers, Archivist at His Majesty's Legation, The Hague
- Gabriel Farwagi, Pro-Consul at Cairo
- William Brehmer Harding Green, Consular Department, Foreign Office
- Frederick Greenwood, His Majesty's Legation, Warsaw
- Vincent John Hughes Laferla, Registrar of His Majesty's Supreme Court, Alexandria
- Reginald Percy Ray, Translator at His Majesty's Legation, Lisbon
- Walter Henry Weedon, Temp. Vice Consul at His Majesty's Legation, Ohristiania
- Francis Charles Benjamin Wood, late Passport Control Officer in Holland

Colonies, Protectorates, etc.

- William James Bramwell, lately Telegraph Engineer, Posts and Telegraph Department, Gold Coast
- Ezekiel Cohen, Principal Clerk in the Office of the High Commissioner for South Africa
- Henry Charles Cottle, formerly Government Printer, Ceylon
- David George Goonewardena, Crown Proctor of Gall©, Ceylon
- Selim Hanna, Assistant District Commandant of Police, Northern District, Palestine
- Georgiana Humphries, Headmistress of the Central School, Eldoret, Kenya Colony
- Samuel Benjamin Jones, Medical Officer and Magistrate, and Coroner, Anguilla, Leeward Islands
- The Reverend Father Christopher James Kirk, of the Mill Hill Mission, Uganda Protectorate; in recognition of his services to the Administration
- Annie Landau, Principal of Evelina de Rothschild's School, Jerusalem; in recognition of her public services
- John Vincent Leach, Resident Magistrate, Parish of St. Catherine, Jamaica
- Joseph Henry Levy, Chairman of the Parochial Board of St. Ann, Jamaica
- Charles Neale, First Inspector of Civil Jails, Iraq
- Sister Emma Ollerenshaw, of the Deaconess's Society of Wesleyans, Johannesburg, Union of South Africa; in recognition of her public services.
- Silverio Izidro Samuel, Confidential Clerk to the Governor of Nigeria

British India

- Mary Louisa, Lady Giles, Burma
- Walter Henry Murphy, Executive Engineer to the Municipal Commission, Civil and Military Station, Bangalore, Mysore
- George Collie Cheyne, Deputy Conservator of Forests, Burma
- Khan Bahadur Muhammad Kalim-ul-Lah Sahib Chida, Assistant Commissioner of Police, Madras
- St. George Alexander Beaty, Deputy Superintendent of Police, Punjab
- Frederic Lionel Gilbert, Superintendent, Government Press, Madras
- Captain Arthur Ambrose Emmanuel Baptist, Assistant Director, School of Tropical Medicine and Hygiene, Calcutta
- Gladice Keevil Rickford, Bombay
- Khan Bahadur Maneokji Mavroji Meihta, Merchant and Motor Factory Proprietor, Poona, Bombay
- Minim Augustus Fernandez, Superintendent and Treasury Officer, Maskat, Persian Gulf
- Charles Attwood Knyvett-Hough, Head Clerk, British Legation, Nepal

On the termination of the administrative functions of the British South Africa Company in Southern Rhodesia and in Northern Rhodesia —

- George Curtis Candler, Assistant Secretary, London Office, British South Africa Company
- Harold Vansittart Francis, Chief Clerk in the Secretariat, Northern Rhodesia
- Lieutenant Harry Hammond, British South Africa Police, Assistant District Superintendent, Criminal Investigation Department, and Assistant Chief Immigration Officer, Southern Rhodesia
- Arthur Rickman Hone, lately Private Secretary to the Administrator, Southern Rhodesia
- Herbert Stanley Keigwin, Director of Native Development, Southern Rhodesia

Honorary Members

- Mustafa el Khipry, Mayor of Ramleh, Palestine; in recognition of his services to the Administration
- Naounr Effendi Tajir, Assistant Collector of Customs and Excise, Iraq

=== Kaisar-i-Hind Medal ===
First Class

- Alice Edith, Countess of Reading CI GBE
- Sreemathi Panapilla Kartiyani Pilla Bhagavathi Pilla Kochamma, Vadasseri Ammaveedu, daughter of His Highness the Maharaja of Travancore, Madras
- The Right Reverend Bishop Francis Stephen Coppel, Nagpur, Central Provinces
- The Reverend Arthur Herbert Bestall, General Superintendent of Wesleyan Missions in Burma
- Dr. M. R. Ry. Pazhamarneri Sundaram Ayyar
- Chandra Sekhara, Ayyar Avargal, Director of the Tuberculosis Institute and Hospital, Madras
- Cowasji Jehangir, Bombay
- Bad Bahadur, Upendra Nath Brahmachari, Additional Physician, Out-Patient Department, Medical College Hospital, Bengal
- Edwin Sheard, Adjutant, Salvation Army, United Provinces
- Raj Bahadur Lala Mathra Das, Assistant Surgeon in the Punjab
- Pir Puran Nath Mahant, Mahant of Bohar in the Rohtak District, Punjab

=== British Empire Medal (BEM) ===
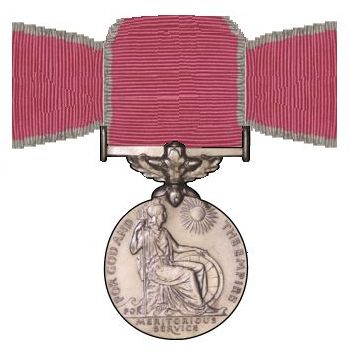
The British Empire Medal for meritorious service

For Gallantry

- Constable Francis Austin Morteshed, Royal Ulster Constabulary
- Constable Samuel Orr, Ulster Special Constabulary

For Meritorious Service

- Joseph Bowman, Marshal of His Majesty's Supreme Court in Constantinople
- Head Constable William Duffy, Royal Ulster Constabulary
- Trooper Gerald Martin, British South African Police
- Head Constable Robert Samuel Pakenham, Royal Ulster Constabulary
- Victor Beckwith Pare

=== King's Police Medal (KPM) ===
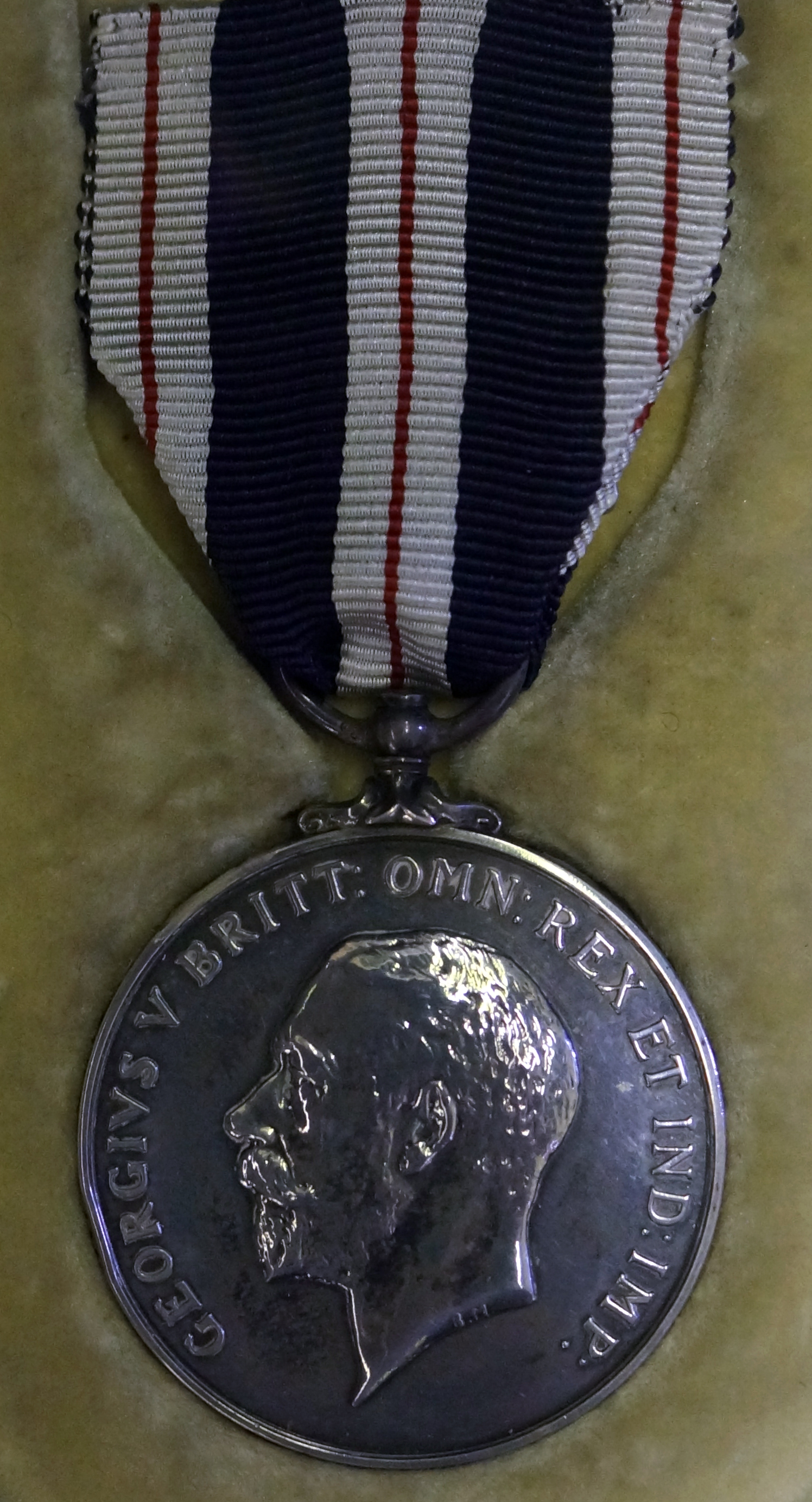
King's Police Medal with the riband for gallantry

- Muhammad Haider, Constable, United Provinces Police
- Gauhar Singh, Naik, United Provinces Police
- Hari Singh Parmar, Sub-Inspector, United Provinces Police
- Ghulam Husain, Head Constable, United Provinces Police
- Muhammad Aslam Khan, Sub-Inspector, United Provinces Police
- Rana Hari Singh, Sub-Inspector, United Provinces Police

=== Imperial Service Order (ISO) ===
Home Civil Service

- William Jackson Bean, Curator, Royal Botanical Gardens, Kew
- Edward Bilcliffe, Superintending Clerk, Department of the Accountant General, Admiralty
- Alfred Henry Bridgman, Higher Clerical Officer, Colonial Office
- James Robert Burnage, Senior Chief Superintendent, Mapping Branch, Land Registry
- Walter George Coles Chief Surveyor, Board of Agriculture for Scotland
- Charles Percy Cooke, Accountant, British Museum
- Charles Alfred Dance, Senior non-professional Clerk, Treasury Solicitor's Department
- Gabriel Day, Inspector of Shipping, Royal Arsenal, Woolwich
- William Frederick Doust, Chief Clerk, National Debt Office
- George Gordon, Staff Officer, Ministry of Transport
- Robert Henshall, Senior Intelligence Officer, Department of Overseas Trade
- Thomas Robinson Johnson, Senior Staff Clerk, Ministry of Health
- William Locke OBE Accountant, Office of Works
- Joseph Putnam, Deputy Director of Audit, Exchequer and Audit Department
- Leonard Walter Thomas, Clerk for Factory Statistics, Home Office
- Frederick John Webb, Assistant Inspector, Board of Education

Colonial Civil Service

- Gaspard Garabet Amirayan, Assistant King's Advocate, Cyprus
- Arthur Thomas Bothamley, Clerk Assistant of the Legislative Council and Gentleman Usher of the Black Rod, Dominion of New Zealand
- James Arthur Edward Bullock MBE Chief Clerk, Colonial Secretary's Department, Hong Kong
- Leon Koenig, Assistant Colonial Secretary, Mauritius
- Inche Abdul Razak bin Haji Gani, the Dato Stia di Raja of Selangor, Federated Malay States
- John Kidston Reid, Clerk of the House of Assembly, State of Tasmania
- Herbert Paul St. Julian, Colonial Postmaster, Fiji
- John Flavius Thompson, Sub-Assistant Treasurer, Gold Coast
- Cecil Hamilton Tucker, Colonial Postmaster, Bermuda
- Wallis Harry Brinsley White, Chief Inspector of Schools, Orange Free State, Union of South Africa

Indian Civil Service

- Walter Samuel Snow, Superintendent, Central Jail, Rajamundry, Madras
- Babu Chandra Nath Sarma, Personal Assistant to the Director of Land Records, Assam
- William Albert-Samuel, Assistant Secretary to Government, Irrigation Department, Bihar and Orissa
- Stephen Karam Singh, Superintendent, Central Police Office, Punjab
- William George Slaney, City Magistrate, Nagpur, Central Provinces
- Andrew Muhiuddin, Superintendent, Deputy Commissioner's Office, Jhelum, Punjab
- Willie Bwye, Registrar, Punjab Irrigation Secretariat, Public Works Department, Punjab
- Raj Sahib Nivaran Chancier Gupta, Head Clerk and Superintendent, Office of the Deputy Judge Advocate-General, Northern Command
- Ernest Cecil Lisbey, Head Clerk to the Commanding Royal Engineer, Baluchistan District, and Secretary in the Public Works Department to the Agent to the Governor General, Baluchistan
- Jose Francisco Vaz, Officiating Superintendent, Rajputana Agency Office

=== Imperial Service Medal (ISM) ===
- Kolandaswami, late Duffadar, High Court, Madras
- Sheikh Moideen SaJaib, late Head Warder, Madras Jail Department, Madras
- Carunguli Thirumalai Nayudu, late Attender, High Court, Madras
- Baldeosing Dhondesing, late Naik in the Executive Engineer's Office, East Khandesh District, Bombay
- Trumpet Major Shaikh Jainudin Shaikh Ismail, late 1st Grade Kote-Duffadar, Kathiawar Agency Police, Bombay
- Munne Ali, late Jemadar to the Governor, United Provinces
- Raghunandan Shukul, late Head Constable, Chhindwara, Central Provinces
