= William Prendergast =

William Prendergast may refer to:

- William Prendergast (general), United States Army general
- William A. Prendergast (1867–1954), American businessman and politician from New York
- Sir William Prendergast (died 1333) (fl. 1311–1333), knight who fought in the Wars of Scottish Independence
- William Christopher Dowling Prendergast (1859–1933), British medical doctor
