= Hugh Fernyhough =

English cricketer and British Army officer (1872–1947)

Personal information
- Full name: Hugh Clifford Fernyhough
- Born: 22 September 1872; Hampstead, Middlesex, England
- Died: 9 October 1947 (aged 75); Aldershot, Hampshire, England
- Batting: Unknown

Domestic team information
- Years: Team
- 1895/96–1898/99: Europeans

Career statistics
Competition	First-class
Matches	2
Runs scored	18
Batting average	9.00
100s/50s	–/–
Top score	12
Catches/stumpings	–/–
- Source: ESPNcricinfo, 27 May 2023

Hugh Clifford Fernyhough CB CMG DSO (22 September 1872 — 9 October 1947) was an English first-class cricketer and British Army officer.

== Early life and military service ==
Fernyhough was born at Hampstead in September 1872. He graduated from the Royal Military College into the King's Own Yorkshire Light Infantry (KOYLI) as a second lieutenant in October 1893, and was promoted to lieutenant in December 1894. He then went with the KOYLI to British India, where he served in the North Western Frontier. His service there saw him partake in the Tirah campaign, where he saw action at the Battle of Shinkamar in January 1898. Whilst serving in British India, Fernyhough made two appearances in first-class cricket for the Europeans against the Parsees in the Bombay Presidency Matches of 1895–96 and 1898–99. He scored 18 runs in his two matches, with a highest score of 12.

Soon after partaking in his second first-class match, Fernyhough went to South Africa to take part in the Second Boer War, during which he was promoted to captain in March 1900. He took part in the Advance on Kimberley in 1899, seeing action at Battles of Belmont and Enslin, with him being wounded in action in the latter engagement. He later took part in the engagements in the Orange Free State (May to August 1900), the Transvaal (August to November 1900) and the Cape Colony (January to March 1901); he was seriously wounded during actions in the Cape Colony. Fernyhough was mentioned in dispatches several times during the war, and was made a Companion of the Distinguished Service Order in September 1901 in recognition of his service during the war. He was also decorated with the Queen's South Africa Medal with three clasps and the King's South Africa Medal with two clasps. Following the war, he remained in South Africa seconded as a signalling officer. In February 1906, he was transferred to the Army Ordnance Department as a 4th Class Ordnance Officer.

== First World War and later life ==
Fernyhough was promoted to major in May 1913, at which point he advanced to become a 3rd Class Ordnance Officer. During this period, he served as Chief Ordnance Officer in Sierra Leone. He served in the First World War on the Western Front. He was made a temporary lieutenant colonel and Ordnance Officer 2nd Class in April 1915, whilst serving as an Assistant Quartermaster-General at General Headquarters. He was made a brevet lieutenant colonel in January 1916, before being appointed by George V to the Order of St Michael and St George in the 1917 New Year Honours. He was further honoured by Belgium in July 1917, when he was appointed to the Order of Leopold. Fernyhough was appointed assistant director of Ordnance Services in May 1918, at which point he was made a temporary colonel and a temporary 1st Class Ordnance Officer. He was mentioned several times in dispatches throughout the war.

Following the war, he was appointed to the War Office in July 1919 and relinquished his acting ranks of colonel and 1st Class Ordnance Officer in the same month. He regained these temporary ranks in February 1921, Fernyhough was appointed a Companion of the Order of the Bath (CB) in the 1924 Birthday Honours. He gained promotion to the full ranks of colonel and Ordnance Officer 1st Class in July 1927, before retiring in September 1929. Having exceeded the age for recall, he was removed from the Reserve of Officers list in September 1932. Fernyhough died at Aldershot in October 1947.
