= William Turakiuta Cooper =

William Turakiuta Cooper (c.1886 – 4 August 1949) was a New Zealand interpreter and land officer.

== Personal life ==
Cooper was of Māori descent, identifying with the Ngāti Kahungunu iwi. He was born in Muriwai, East Coast, New Zealand about 1886. His second wife was Whina Cooper.

Cooper was one of three members of a royal commission set up in 1926 to inquire into confiscations of native lands after the land wars of the nineteenth century as well as other grievances alleged by Māori. The commission has come to be known as the Sim Commission. The other two commissioners were William Sim and Vernon Herbert Reed. The Commission reported back to the Government in 1928.
