= Malcolm Watson =

British malariologist (1873-1955)

Sir Malcolm Watson
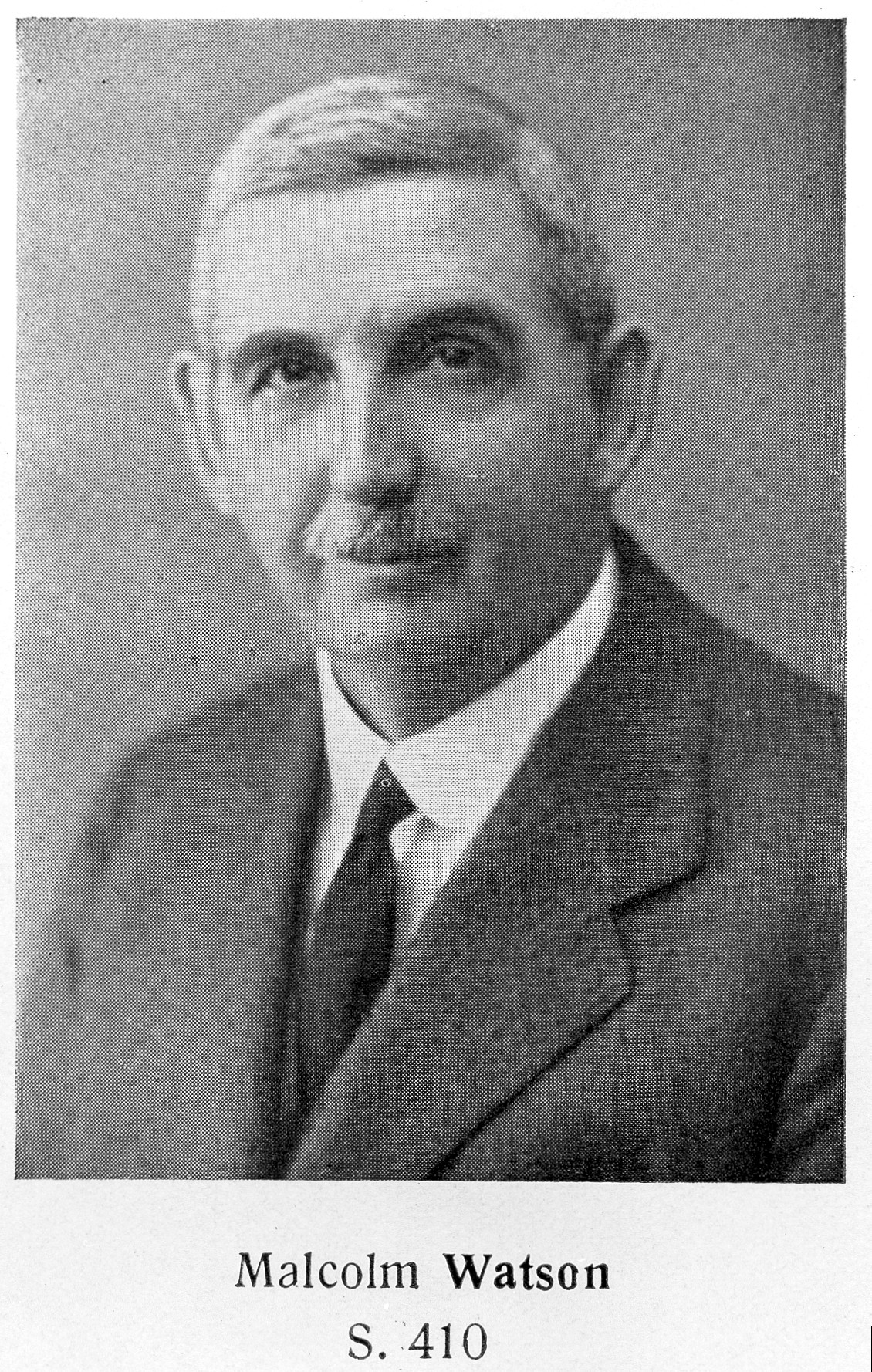
- Born: 24 August 1873; Cathcart, Scotland
- Died: 28 December 1955 (aged 82); Peaslake, Surrey
- Education: Glasgow University
- Occupation: Malariologist
- Years active: 1900-1942
- Known for: Pioneering techniques in malarial prevention
- Children: 3 sons and 1 daughter

Sir Malcolm Watson (24 August 1873 – 28 December 1955) was a British pioneer malariologist who developed new methods to combat malaria in Malaya, and later went on to advise governments and industries in many countries on malaria prevention.

== Early life and education ==
Watson was born on 24 August 1873 in Cathcart, Renfrewshire, Scotland, the second son of George Watson, a clothier. He was educated at High School of Glasgow, took his MD at Glasgow University, graduating in medicine and arts, and went on to University College, London where he received a Cambridge Diploma in public health.

== Career ==
in 1900, Watson entered the Medical Service of the Federated Malay States, and the following year was posted to Klang as district surgeon. It was here that Watson first put into practice measures to combat malaria following the discovery by Ronald Ross in 1897 that the disease was transmitted by mosquitoes. In Klang, and in many other areas of Malaya, the population had been devastated by malaria, and he began a vigorous program of mosquito control, introducing radical new methods to prevent larval reproduction in different environments.

His measures, which proved remarkably successful, heralded the beginning of a campaign of mosquito control which helped change the face of Malaya so that when he left Malaya 28 years later malaria was under control. Described as the "man who conquered malaria", Ross acclaimed his work in Malaya as "the greatest sanitary achievement ever accomplished in the British Empire."

In 1927, Watson left Malaya having spent seven years in government service and 21 years as a private consultant working in malarial research and prevention, and at the request of Ronald Ross joined, as director of the malaria department, the newly created Ross Institute of Tropical Health in Putney Heath, London. When Ross died in 1932 he became Director of the Institute.

Whilst serving with the Ross Institute he worked with governments and industry as adviser on prevention of malaria in many areas of the world including India, Nepal, the Philippines, the Balkans, South America and South Africa. He retired in 1942.

== Personal life and death ==
Watson married Jean Alice Gray, a nurse, and they had three sons. After she died, he married Constance Evelyn Loring in 1938, one of his research assistants, and they had a daughter, Kate, who became a midwife.

Watson died on 28 December 1955 in Peaslake, Surrey.

== Publications ==
- The Prevention of Malaria in the Federated Malay States (1911)
- Rural Sanitation in the Tropics (1915)
- Observations on malaria control (1924)
- Mists, mosquitoes and malaria (1930)
- African Highway (1953)

== Honours ==
Watson was appointed a Knight Bachelor in the 1924 Birthday Honours.
