= 1924 Birthday Honours (New Zealand) =

Awards list for New Zealand

The 1924 King's Birthday Honours in New Zealand, celebrating the official birthday of King George V, were appointments made by the King on the recommendation of the New Zealand government to various orders and honours to reward and highlight good works by New Zealanders. They were announced on 3 June 1924.

The recipients of honours are displayed here as they were styled before their new honour.

== Knight Bachelor ==
- James Henry Gunson CMG CBE – mayor of the City of Auckland. In recognition of his public services.
- The Honourable William Alexander Sim – judge of the Supreme Court.
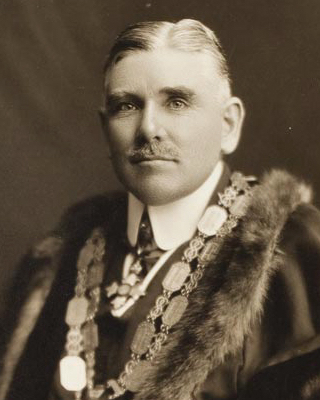
Sir James Gunson

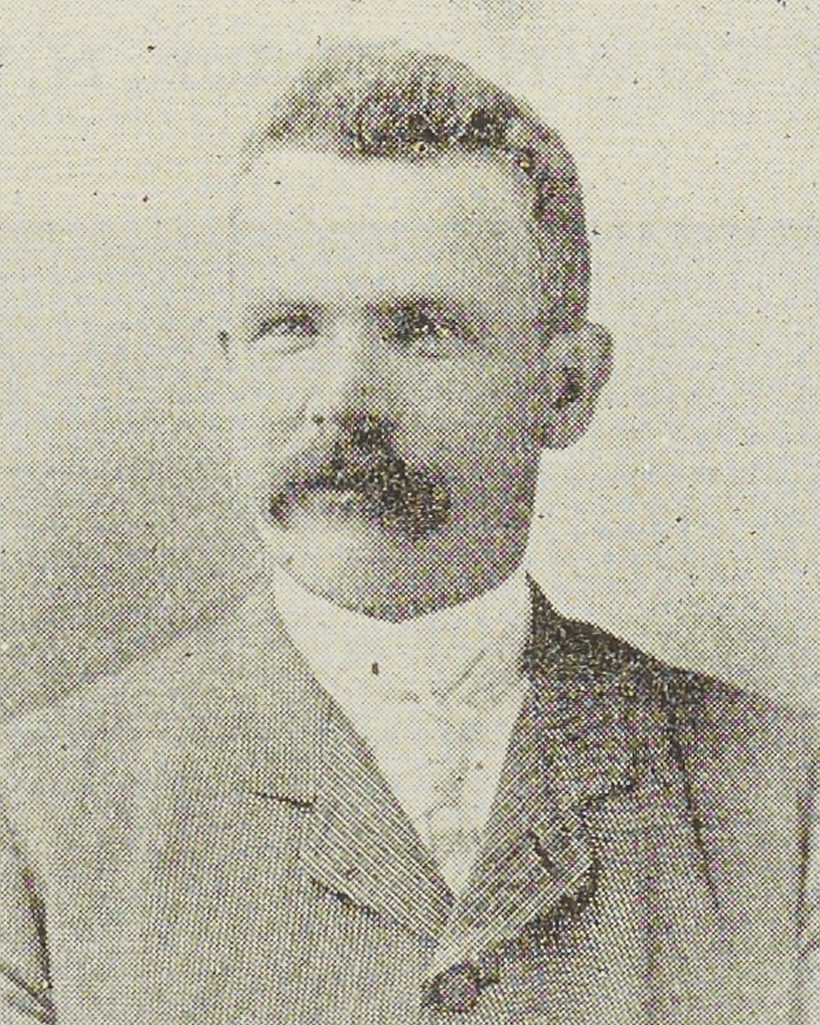
Sir William Sim

== Order of Saint Michael and Saint George ==
=== Companion (CMG) ===
- Alexander Francis Lowe – clerk of Parliaments and clerk of the Legislative Council.
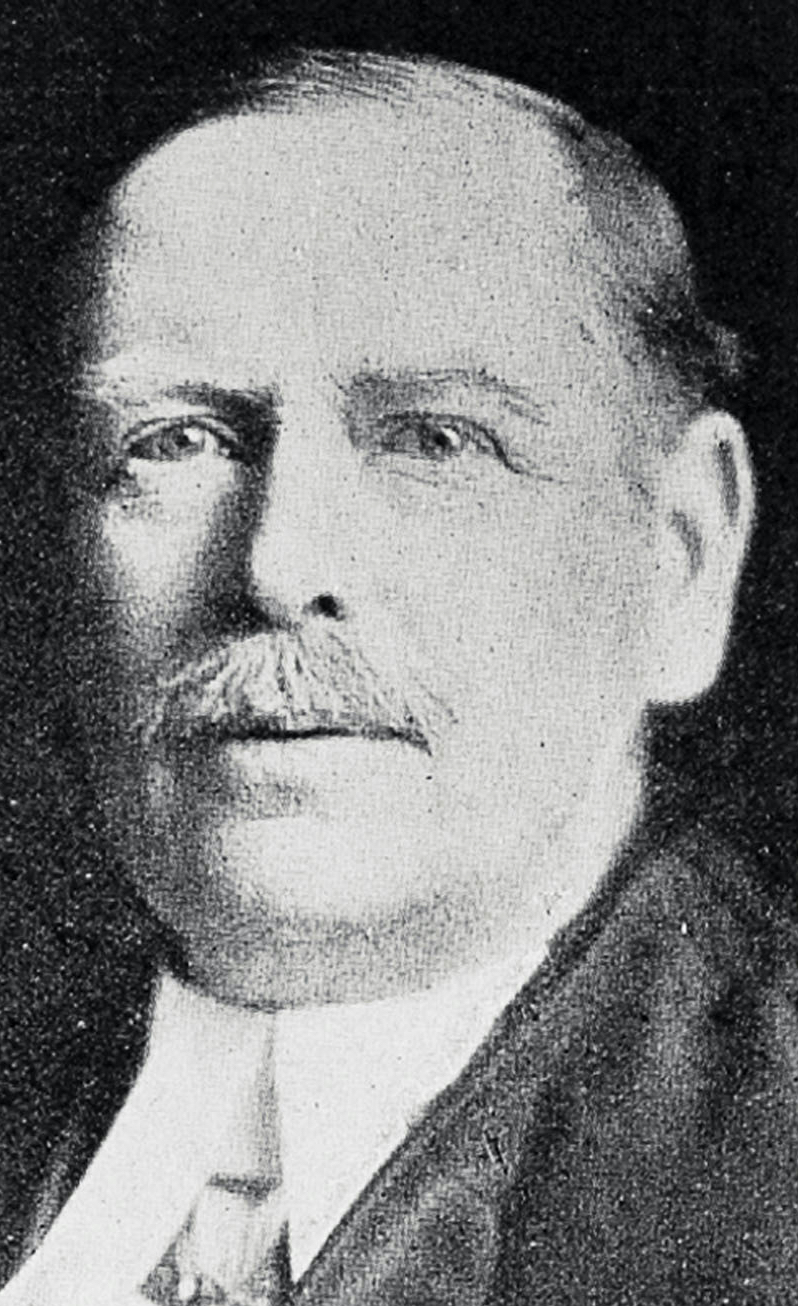
Alex Lowe

== Order of the British Empire ==
=== Commander (CBE) ===
Civil division

- Donald George Clark OBE – commissioner of taxes.
- George Frederick Copus – finance officer in the office of the high commissioner in London for New Zealand.

== Companion of the Imperial Service Order (ISO) ==
- Arthur Thomas Bothamley – clerk assistant of the Legislative Council and Gentleman Usher of the Black Rod.
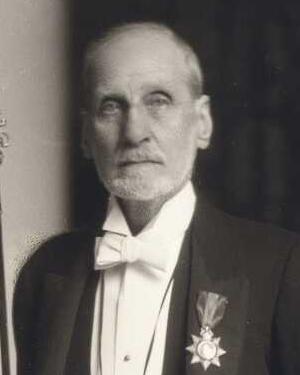
Arthur Bothamley
