= Alfred Ransom (Royal Navy officer) =

Rear-Admiral Alfred Ransom CBE
- Born: 22 August 1871
- Died: 28 June 1953 (aged 81); Torquay
- Military career
- Allegiance: United Kingdom
- Branch: Royal Navy
- Service years: 1888–1926
- Rank: Rear-Admiral
- Conflicts: Boxer Rebellion; First World War
- Awards: CBE

Rear-Admiral Alfred Charles Ransom CBE (1871–1953) was a senior Royal Navy officer.

== Naval career ==
Born on 22 August 1871, Alfred Ransom was educated at Bedford Modern School (1878–84), and Bedford School. He received his first commission in the Royal Navy in 1888 and served during the anti-slavery Gambia Expedition, in 1894. He served in China during the Boxer Rebellion, between 1900 and 1901, and during the First World War, serving aboard HMS Dreadnought between 1914 and 1916. He attained the rank of paymaster rear admiral and retired from the Royal Navy in 1926.

Rear Admiral Alfred Ransom was appointed a Commander of the Order of the British Empire (CBE) in the 1924 Birthday Honours. He died in Torquay on 28 June 1953.
