= Babington Bennett Newbould =

Sir Babington Bennett Newbould
- Born: 7 March 1867; Chiswick, Middlesex, England
- Died: 2 February 1937 (aged 69); Exmouth, Devon, England
- Occupations: Puisne Judge, High Court, Calcutta

Sir Babington Bennett Newbould (7 March 1867 – 2 February 1937), styled Mr Justice Newbould, was a Puisne Judge in the High Court, Calcutta.

== Biography ==
Born on 7 March 1867, Bennett Newbould was educated at Bedford School and at Pembroke College, Cambridge. He entered the Indian Civil Service in 1885 and was posted to Bengal. He was transferred to Assam in 1894, was appointed Deputy Commissioner in 1895, at the age of 28, and was elected as a Judge in 1900. He was Superintendent and Remembrancer of Legal Affairs for Bengal, between 1912 and 1916, and Puisne Judge in the High Court, Calcutta, between 1916 and 1927. He was knighted in the 1924 Birthday Honours and retired in 1927.

Sir Bennett Newbould is commemorated by plaques in the Calcutta Club. He died in Exmouth, Devon, on 2 February 1937, aged 69.
