= Philip Pocock (cricketer) =

English cricketer and soldier

Personal information
- Full name: Philip Frederick Pocock
- Born: 5 December 1871; Mussoorie, North-Western Provinces, British India
- Died: 9 November 1941 (aged 69); Stansted Mountfitchet, Hertfordshire, England
- Batting: Unknown

Domestic team information
- Years: Team
- 1896/97–1898/99: Europeans

Career statistics
Competition	First-class
Matches	3
Runs scored	12
Batting average	4.00
100s/50s	–/–
Top score	9
Catches/stumpings	–/–
- Source: Cricinfo, 7 December 2023

Philip Frederick Pocock CB DSO (5 December 1871 – 9 November 1941) was an English first-class cricketer and an officer in both the British Army and the British Indian Army.

Pocock was born in December 1871 in British India at Mussoorie. He attended the Royal Military College at Sandhurst, graduating from there into the King's Regiment (Liverpool) as a second lieutenant in March 1891. Pocock transferred to the British Indian Army in July 1892, being concurrently promoted to lieutenant. While in serving in India, Pocock made three appearances in first-class cricket for the Europeans cricket team in the Bombay Presidency Match between 1896 and 1898. In these, he scored 12 runs with a highest score of 9. In the Indian Army, promotion to captain followed in July 1901. He was made a brigade major in May 1905, with promotion to major following in March 1909, at which point Pocock was serving with the 119th Infantry.

He served in the First World War with the 120th Rajputana Infantry in the Mesopotamian campaign, during which he was mentioned in dispatches and made a Companion of the Distinguished Service Order in August 1918. During the campaign, he was promoted to lieutenant colonel in March 1917. Following the war, he served in the Waziristan campaign, being mentioned in dispatches. By 1922, he held the rank of colonel. Pocock was decorated by France with the Croix de Guerre in February 1922, for services rendered during the First World War. In the 1924 Birthday Honours, he was made a Companion of the Order of the Bath. He was later appointed a brigade commander with the 20th Indian Infantry Brigade in September 1926, before being appointed an area commandant in November 1926. Pocock retired in May 1927, with him being granted the honorary rank of brigadier in August 1928. He retired to England after the cessation of his military career, where he died in November 1941 at Stansted Mountfitchet, Hertfordshire.
