= Edward Charlton (British Army officer) =

Brigadier-General Edward Charlton CB CMG DSO DL
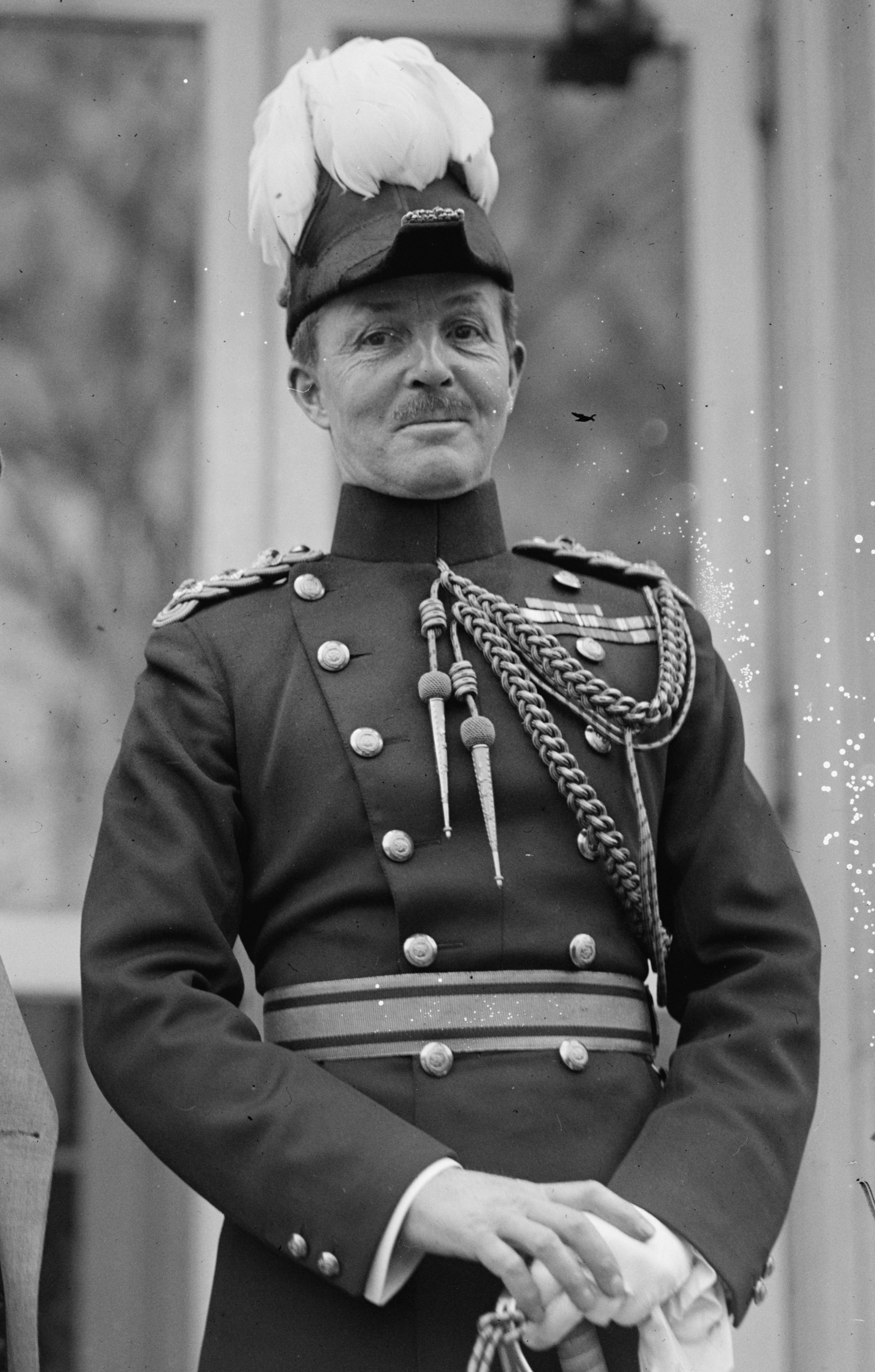
- Born: Claud Edward Charles Graham Charlton; 25 August 1871
- Died: 26 June 1961 (aged 89)

Brigadier-General Claud Edward Charles Graham Charlton CB CMG DSO DL (25 August 1871 – 26 June 1961) was a British Army officer and Deputy Lieutenant for Essex.

== Life and career ==
Charlton was the son of Lieutenant-Colonel Richard Granville Charlton. He was educated at Royal Military Academy, Woolwich, and joined the Royal Artillery where he was commissioned as a second lieutenant on 24 July 1891.

During his career he served with the Royal Horse Artillery and Royal Field Artillery. Promoted to lieutenant on 24 July 1894, he served in the Tirah Campaign of 1897-98, was promoted to captain on 13 February 1900, and served in the Sudan in 1902.

In the First World War, he was mentioned in despatches and was awarded the Belgian Croix de Guerre. From 1920 to 1923, he commanded West Lancashire Division of the Royal Artillery (Territorial Army) and was Military Attaché at the British Embassy in Washington D.C. from 1923 to 1927.

He was appointed a Companion of the Order of the Bath (CB) in the 1924 Birthday Honours.

From 1928, he lived at Great Canfield Park in Takeley, Essex. He was a Deputy Lieutenant for Essex and High Sheriff of that county for 1947–48.

In 1906, he married Gwendoline, daughter of Arthur Whitaker of Cadogan Square, London.

== Honours ==
- Tirah Campaign Medal (with two clasps), 1897–98
- Sudan Campaign Medal (with clasp), 1902
- Companion of the Distinguished Service Order, 1917
- Companion of St.Michael and St. George, 1919
- Companion of the Bath (Military), 1924
- Belgian Croix de Guerre
- Order of Osminieh (3rd class)
- Order of the Medjidie (4th class)
- Defence Medal
