= William Sim =

New Zealand lawyer and judge

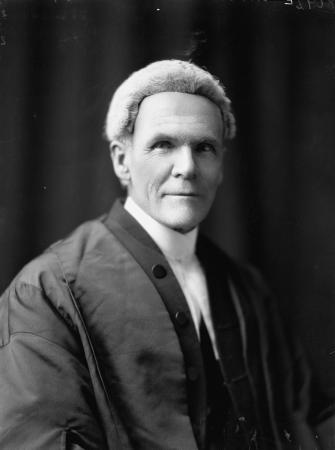
Sim in 1924

Sir William Alexander Sim (13 September 1858 – 29 August 1928) was a New Zealand lawyer and judge.

He was born in Wanganui, New Zealand, and died in Wellington. Wilfrid Sim was his son.

In the 1924 King's Birthday Honours, Sim was appointed a Knight Bachelor.

== Sim Commission ==
Sim was appointed as chairman of a royal commission set up in 1926 to inquire into confiscations of native lands in the nineteenth century as well as other grievances alleged by Māori. The commission has come to be known as the Sim Commission. The other two commissioners were Vernon Herbert Reed and William Cooper.

The commission was to report on four areas:

(1) "Whether, having regard to all the circumstances and necessities of the period during which proclamations and Orders-in-Council under the said Acts were made and confiscations effected, such confiscations or any of them exceeded in quantity what was fair and just, whether, as a penalty for rebellion and other acts of that nature, or as providing for protection by settlement as defined in the said Acts.

(2) "Whether any lands included in any confiscation were of such a nature that they should have been excluded for some special reason.

(3) "Whether any, and if so, what, natives (having a title to or interest in lands confiscated), are, in your opinion, justly entitled to claim compensation in respect of the confiscation of such title or interest, and if so, what natives or classes or families of natives are now entitled by descent or otherwise to claim and receive such compensation.

(4) "Whether reserves or other provision subsequently made for the support and maintenance of natives within one or more of the classes excepted were, in regard to any particular tribe or hapu, inadequate for the purpose."

The Commission reported back to the Government in 1928.

== See also ==
The 1908 Blackball miners' strike
