= Alexander Lowe =

New Zealand civil servant (1861–1929)

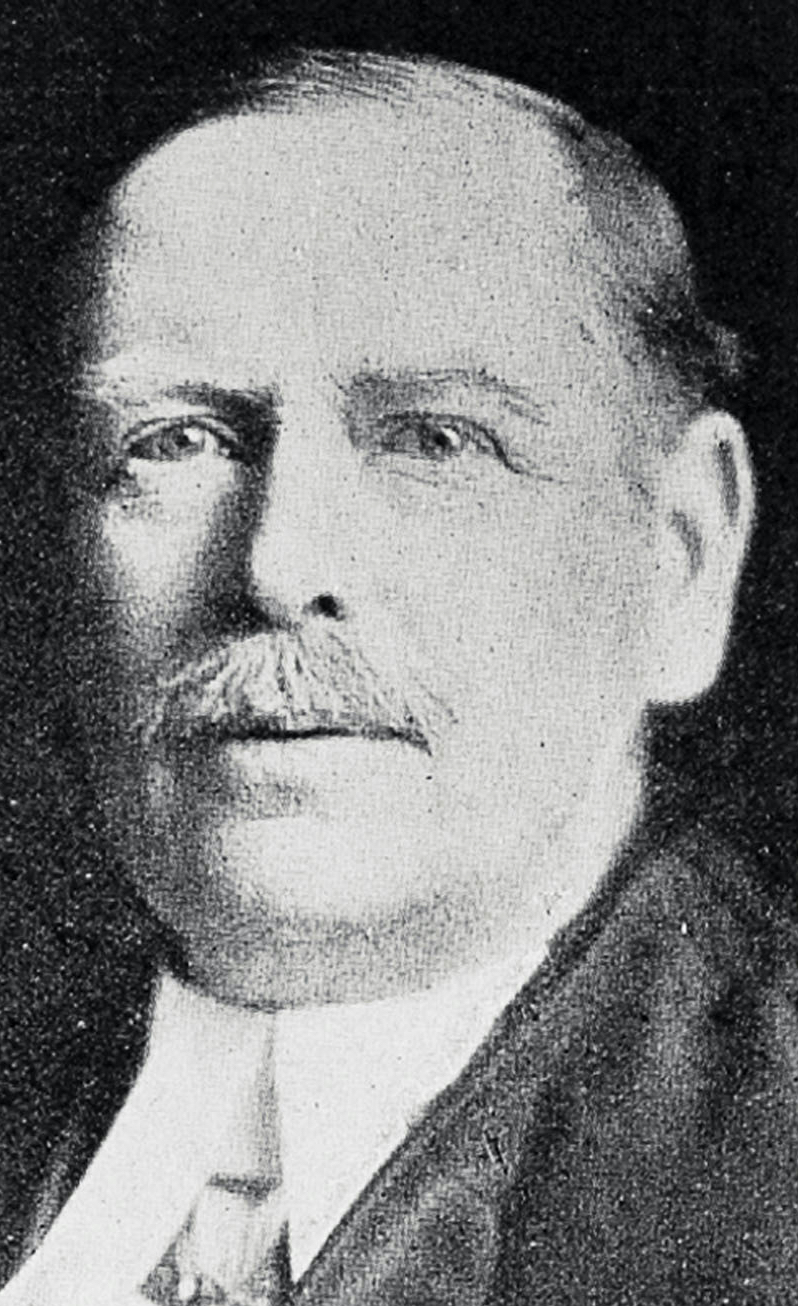

5th Clerk of the New Zealand House of Representatives
- In office 1915–1919
- Preceded by: Henry Otterson
- Succeeded by: Edward William Kane

Personal details
- Born: Alexander Francis Lowe; 1861 Nelson, New Zealand
- Died: 20 November 1929 (aged 67–68) train from Wellington to Rotorua
- Spouse: Laura Phillips
- Children: three sons

Alexander Francis Lowe CMG (1861 – 20 November 1929) was a New Zealand civil servant.

Lowe was born in Nelson in 1861, the son of James Townsend Lowe. He received his education at Nelson College. On 9 January 1895, he married Laura Phillips at St John's Church in Hororata. She was the eldest daughter of the late Henry Phillips, who had owned Rockwood station in Hororata. Wilfred Hall, a son of John Hall, was Lowe's best man.

Lowe was Clerk of the House of Representatives from 1915 until 1919 and Clerk of the Legislative Council and Clerk of Parliaments from 1920.

Lowe was appointed Companion of the Order of St Michael and St George (CMG) in the 1924 Birthday Honours.

Lowe died suddenly on 20 November 1929. The Lowes were travelling by train from Wellington to Rotorua for a holiday and he died during the journey at Mangaweka, with his body removed from the train at Taihape railway station. The couple had three sons. His wife died in 1962.
