= William Christopher Dowling Prendergast =

William Christopher Dowling Prendergast CBE, (1859–1933) was a medical doctor who spent much of his life researching the effects of lead on the life span of people working in the pottery industry. He was born on 8 February 1859 and his parents were John Prendergast, a native of County Waterford, Ireland and Julianne Dowling, a native of the island of St. Helena. Prendergast lived in Hanley, Staffordshire, and wrote "The Potter And Lead Poisoning" in 1898 and other articles on the effects of lead poisoning. In the 1924 Birthday Honours, Dr. Prendergast was appointed Commander of the Order of the British Empire (CBE). After his retirement, he lived in Falmouth, Cornwall, and died on 12 March 1933.
