= Holy Trinity Church, New Plymouth =

Heritage church in New Plymouth, New Zealand

Holy Trinity Church
- Holy Trinity Church (Anglican); New Plymouth
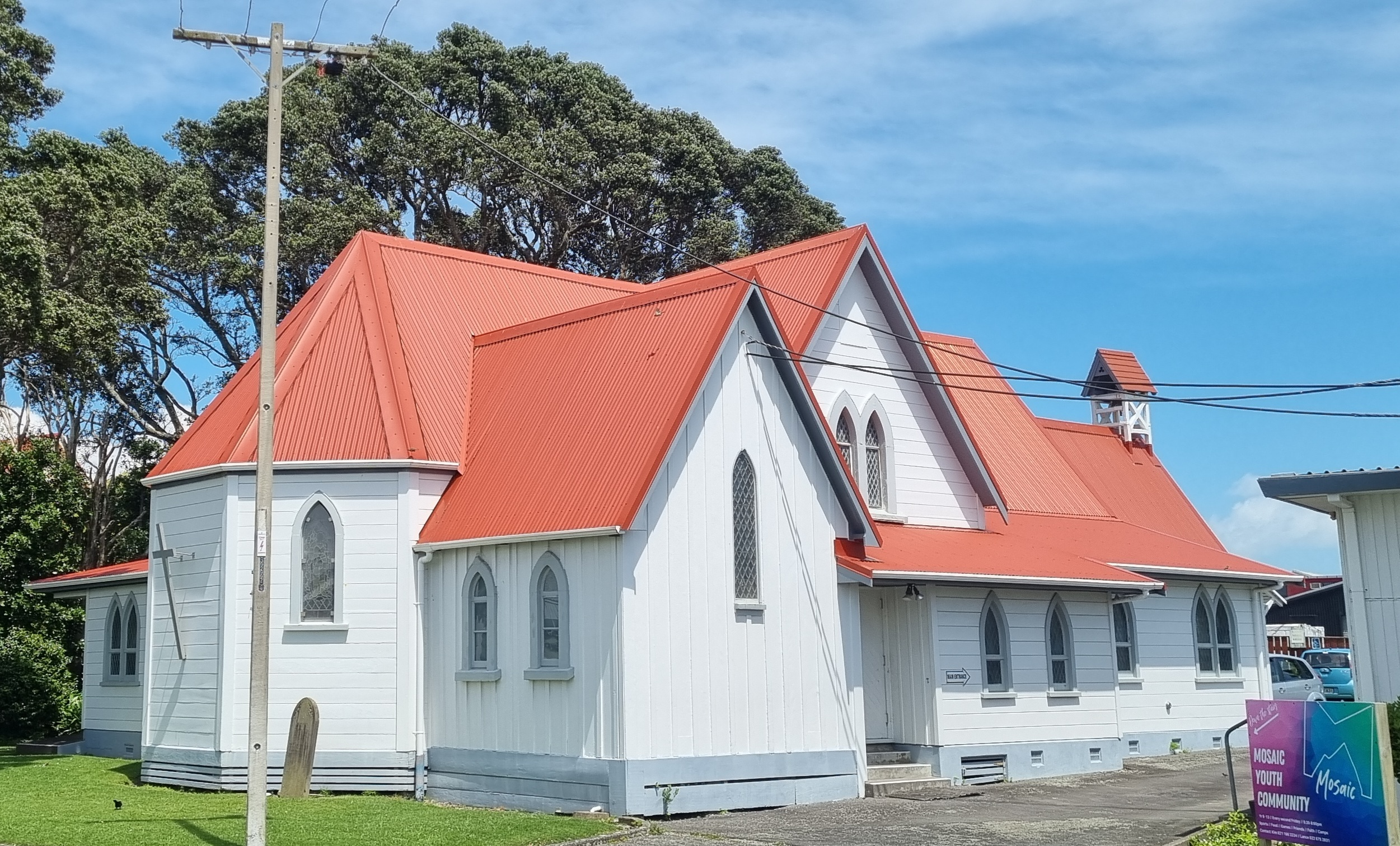
- Holy Trinity Church, from the north
- Holy Trinity Church
- 39°02′58″S 174°05′55″E
- Location: 12 Henui Street, Fitzroy, New Plymouth
- Country: New Zealand
- Denomination: Anglican
- Website: holytrinity.co.nz

History
- Former name: Te Henui Church
- Status: Church
- Founded: 1842
- Founder: Bishop George Selwyn

Architecture
- Functional status: Active
- Architects: Frederick Thatcher (1840s); James Sanderson (1888); John Francis Messenger (1903, 1927)
- Style: Gothic Revival
- Years built: 1845–1872
- Completed: 1872

Specifications
- Materials: Timber

Administration
- Parish: Holy Trinity Fitzroy

Heritage New Zealand – Category 1
- Designated: 23 August 2012
- Reference no.: 893

Holy Trinity Church is a heritage-listed Anglican building at 12 Henui Street, Fitzroy, New Plymouth, New Zealand.

The church is one of the heritage buildings registered by Heritage New Zealand as a Category 1 Historic Place located in New Plymouth. It is one of the few remaining church buildings that had their foundations in the earliest period of European settlement. The current building replaced the original Anglican chapel, which was built in the 1840s, with the foundation stone laid by Bishop George Selwyn and designed by Frederick Thatcher, a London-trained architect, and one of the first settlers arriving in New Plymouth in 1843.

The current building is the result of the incorporation of the original building into various expansions. Having been altered in 1872, the church was extended in 1888 by James Sanderson, and again in 1903 by Francis Messenger. It was renovated in 1927 (also by Messenger) and then again in the 1960s.

== History ==
New Plymouth was chosen as the site for New Zealand’s second European colony, with settlers arriving from 1841 onwards. The beginnings of Christianity in the area came as a result of the need to provide the familiar spiritual and cultural institutions of home to the settlers, as well as missionary services to the Maori population. As the majority of colonists were members of the Church of England, the Church Mission Society was able to seek the appointment of a Bishop for New Zealand, tasked with setting up the Anglican constitution in the new Diocese of New Zealand. Initially, the diocese included the whole country as well as islands from Polynesia.

In 1841 George Augustus Selwyn was appointed the Bishop of New Zealand. He arrived in New Zealand in 1842 and began his work.

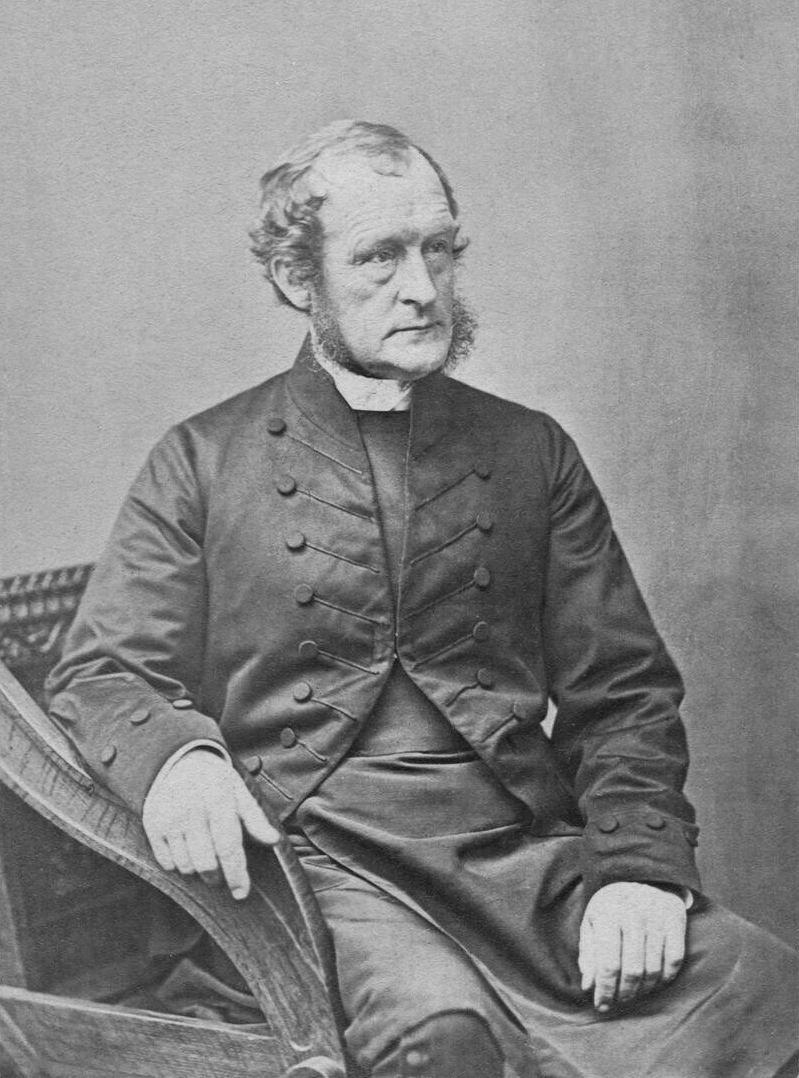
Bishop George Selwyn

After visiting New Plymouth in October 1842, Bishop Selwyn begun to organize the construction of churches in this new parish. He appointed the reverend William Bolland as Deacon for the parish of New Plymouth, allocating an existing sandstone house at Te Henui as residence for him and his family.

He also got in touch with Frederick Thatcher, a London-trained architect, associate of the Royal Institute of British Architects, who arrived in New Plymouth in 1843. He was a key figure in the development of New Zealand’s Gothic Revival vernacular churches.

With the funding provided by the Bishop Selwyn, reverend Bolland along with architect Frederick Thatcher begun the building process of two new churches, St Mary’s Church in central New Plymouth, and the Holy Trinity Church at Henui, now in Fitzroy.

Inaugurated in 1845 with the foundation stone laid by Bishop George Selwyn, the Holy Trinity Church is the “oldest edifice erected for (Anglican) Divine service in Taranaki” and is one of New Zealand’s oldest remaining churches, or remnants of churches. The initial building was a board and thatch construction, and was only intended as a temporary structure. The advent of the Taranaki Wars and other factors, however, delayed the building of a permanent structure until 1872 when board, battens and shingles replaced the existing rustic cladding materials.

The current building is the result of various expansions. The 1870s and 1880s alterations to the building also coincide with a second wave of church building in New Zealand when many other early churches were either replaced or expanded. Having been altered in 1872, in 1888 the building was then divided in two to accommodate the creation of transepts. After three further significant projects, the size of the building have expanded, and as a result the small and simple initial building was transformed into a modestly sized timber church. The additions to the simple original Holy Trinity Church building have included Gothic Revival features such as transepts, an apse, lancet windows and high steep gables.

The historic importance of the Holy Trinity Church is based on its direct association with the establishment of the Church of England in New Zealand. The association of the place with Bishop Selwyn who is of national historical significance, and figures of considerable local importance, such as Reverend Bolland and Archdeacon Govett, further increases its relevance as these people shaped the Church in the mid-nineteenth century, not to mention that the original building was a rare survivor of the Taranaki Wars. Holy Trinity Church also has architectural importance because of its associations with Frederick Thatcher and significant local architects, James Sanderson and Francis John (Frank) Messenger.

The current building was registered in the New Zealand Historic Places Trust (now Heritage New Zealand), on 23 August 2012.

== Image gallery ==
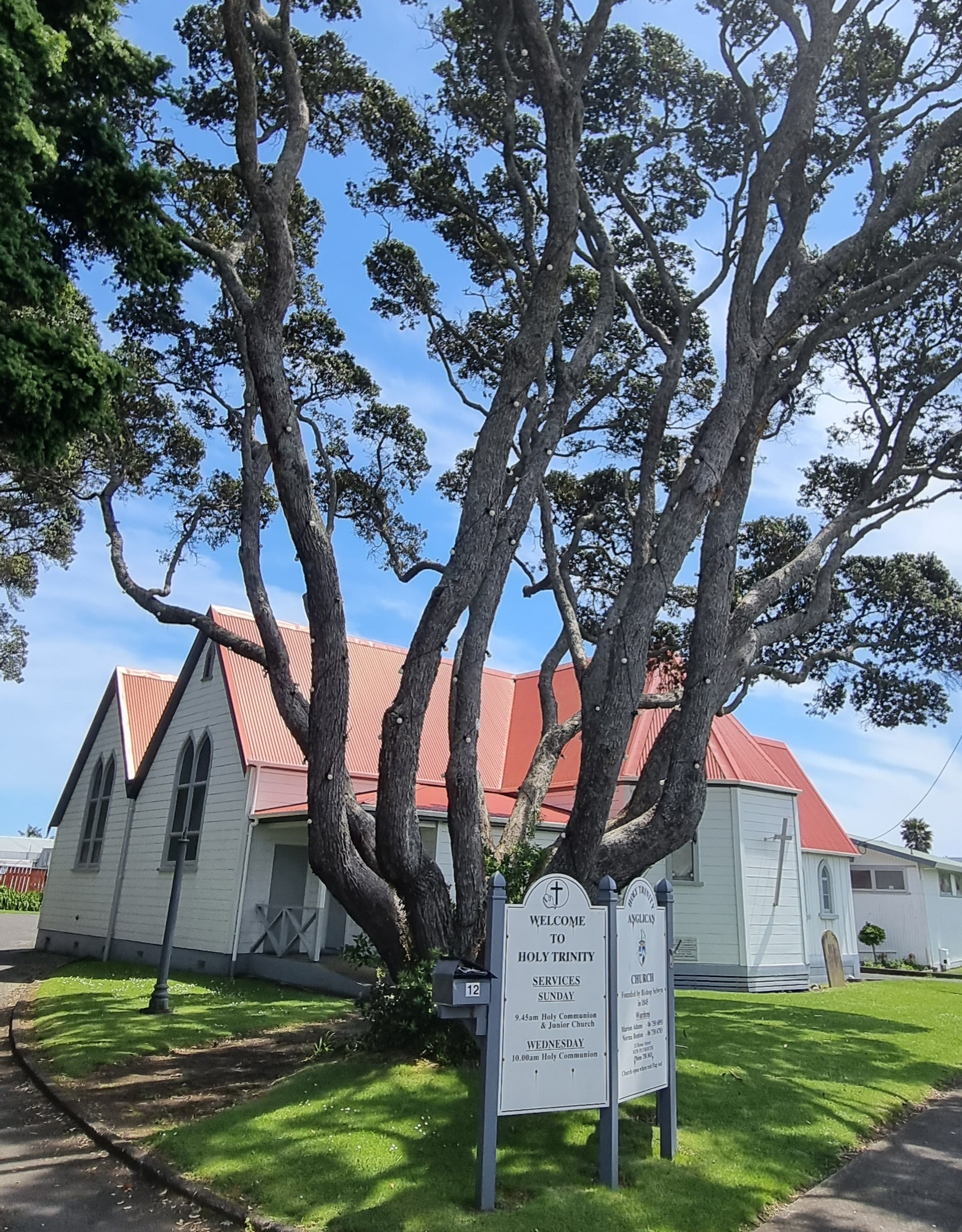
Holy Trinity Church

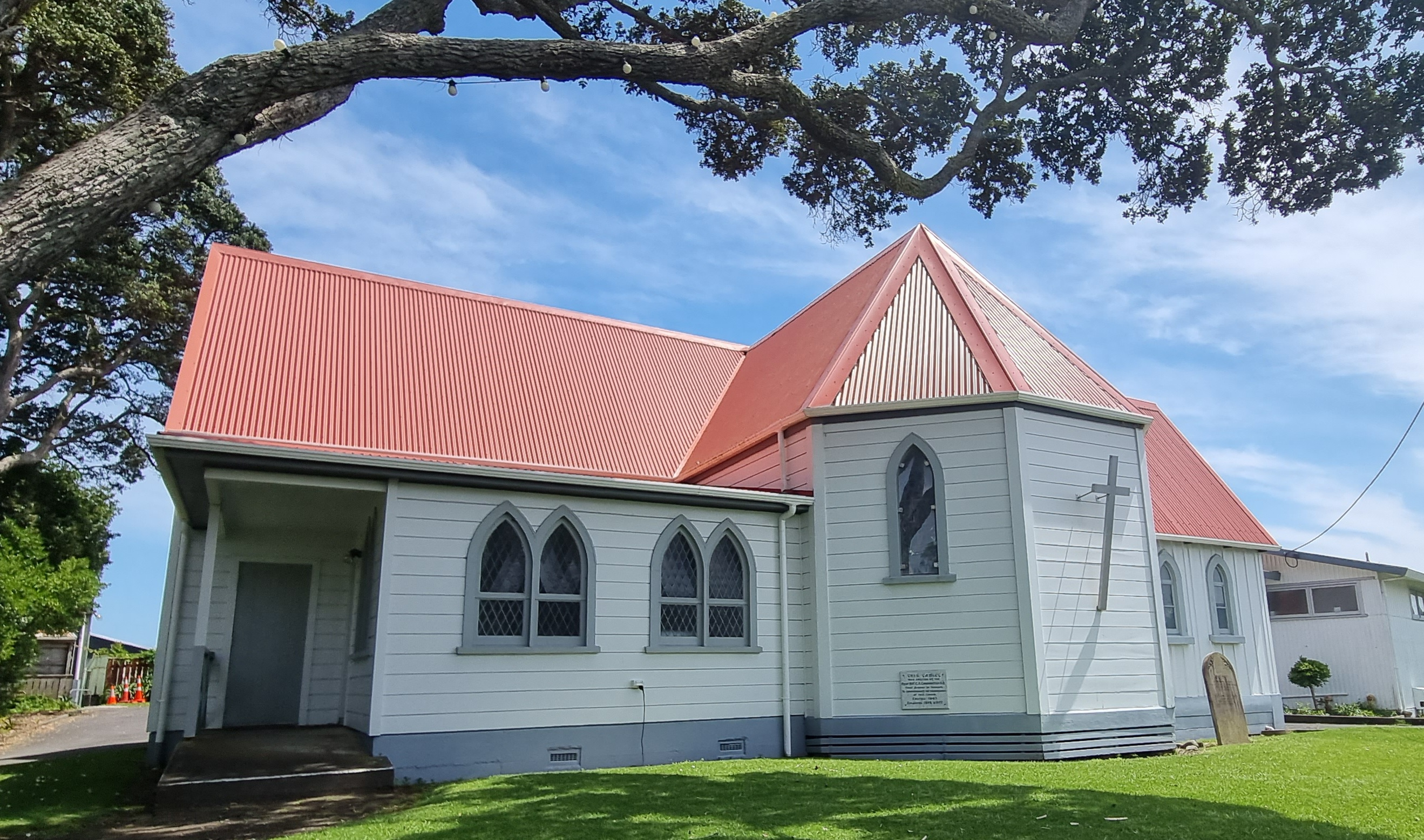
Holy Trinity Church, east side

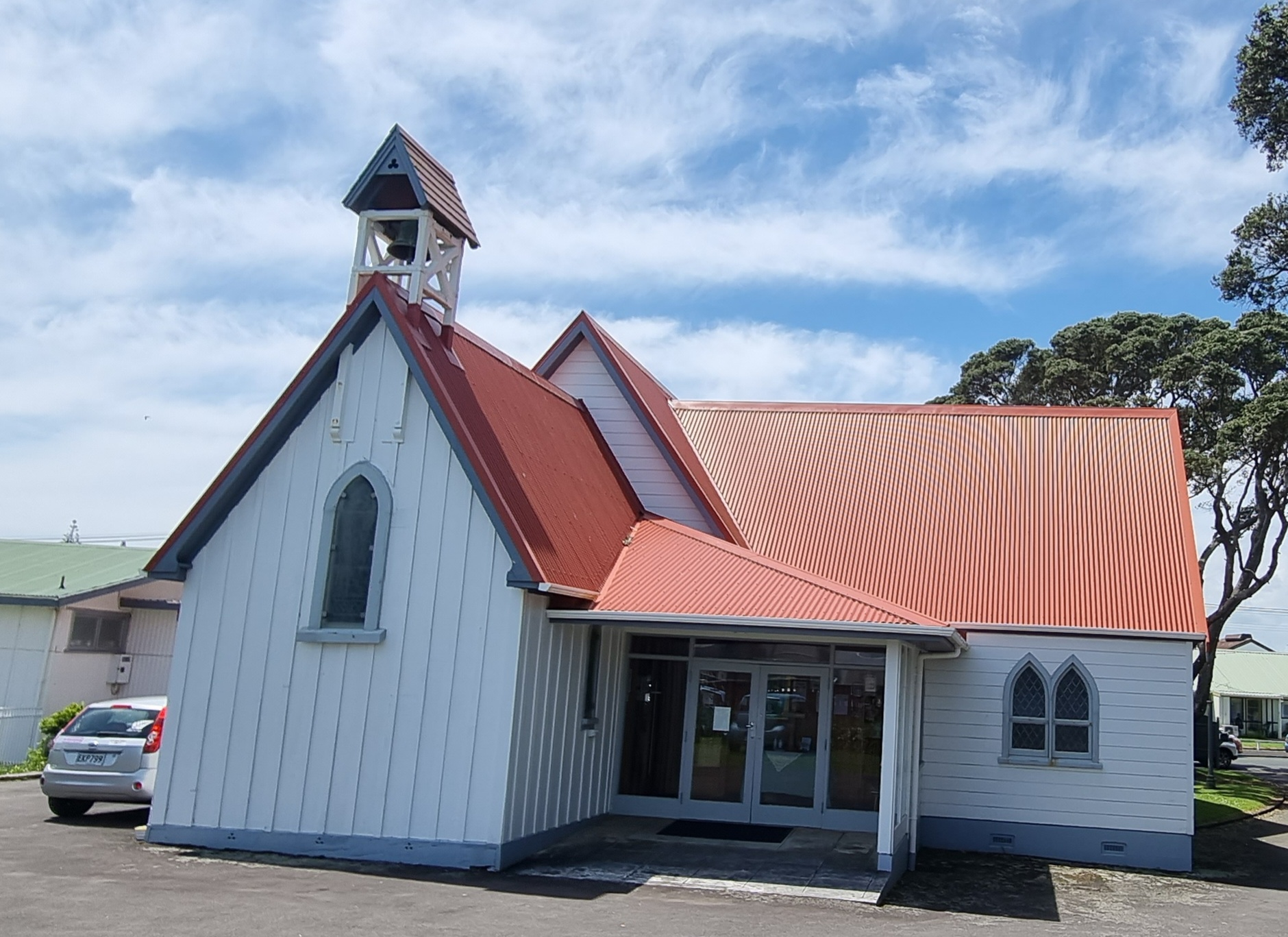
Holy Trinity Church, west side

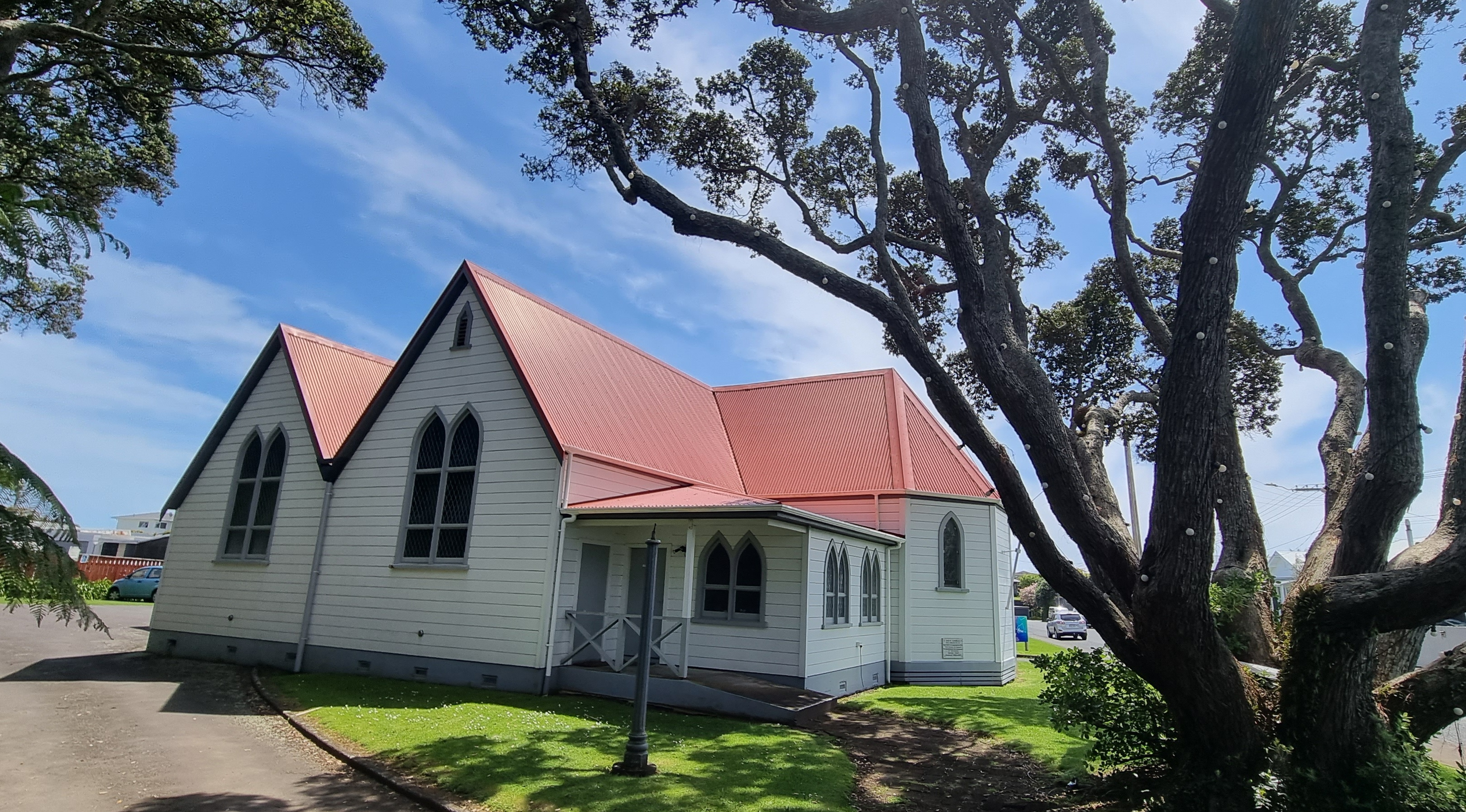
Holy Trinity Church, south side

== Bibliography ==
- Heritage New Zealand, New Zealand Heritage List

=== Additional resources ===
- Porter, Frances; Historic Buildings of New Zealand: North Island, New Zealand Historic Places Trust, Auckland, N.Z., Methuen, 1983, ISBN 0456031103
