= Te Henui Vicarage =

Heritage building in New Zealand

Te Henui Vicarage New Plymouth
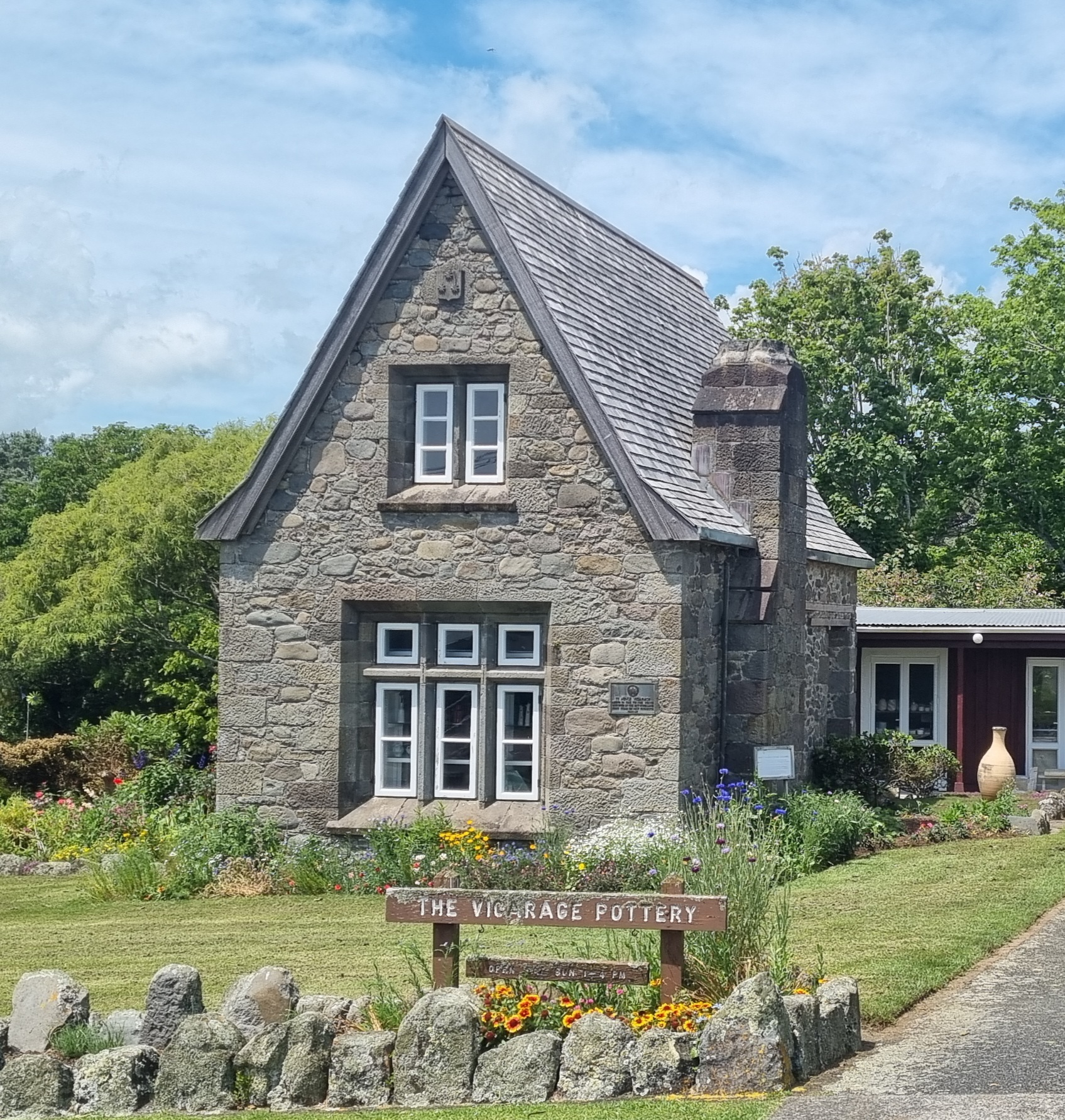
- Interactive map of the Te Henui Vicarage; New Plymouth area

General information
- Architectural style: Gothic Revival
- Location: 290 Courtenay Street, Strandon, New Plymouth, New Zealand
- Coordinates: 39.053557°S 174.091375°E
- Current tenants: New Plymouth Potters
- Completed: 1845
- Owner: New Plymouth District Council

Technical details
- Material: Stone (Andesite)

Design and construction
- Architect: Frederick Thatcher

Heritage New Zealand – Category 1
- Designated: 23 June 2011
- Reference no.: 892

Te Henui Vicarage from New Plymouth, New Zealand, is one of the heritage buildings of the city, registered by Heritage New Zealand as a Category 1 Historic Place, situated in the suburb of Strandon. It features the symbol of the undivided diocese of New Zealand (1841–1856) affixed to the front elevation.

Associated with the earliest period of European settlement in New Plymouth, the vicarage is one of the relatively few buildings in New Plymouth that was not demolished during the Taranaki Wars, signifying the esteem that the building had also with local Maori.

== History ==
With the signing of the Treaty of Waitangi on 6 February 1840 and the declaration of sovereignty on 21 May 1840, the number of immigrants to New Zealand, particularly from the United Kingdom, began to increase. Frederic Alonzo Carrington, the 32-year-old Chief Surveyor for the Plymouth Company, choose New Plymouth as the site for New Zealand's second European colony.

The beginnings of Christianity in the area came as a result of the need to provide familiar spiritual and cultural institutions to the settlers, as well as missionary services to the Maori people. As the majority of colonists were members of the Church of England, the Church Mission Society was able to seek the appointment of a Bishop for New Zealand, tasked with setting up the Anglican constitution in the new Diocese of New Zealand. Initially, the diocese included the whole of New Zealand as well as islands from Polynesia.

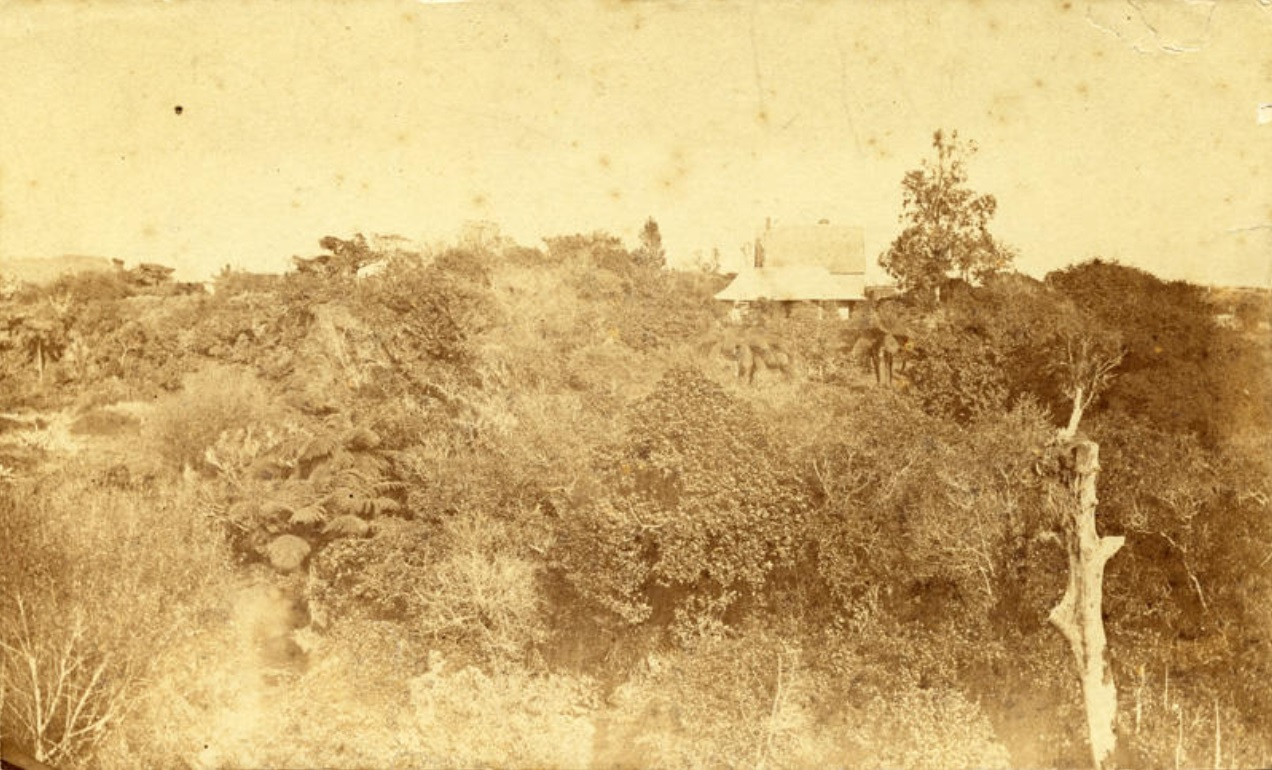
Te Henui Vicarage (ca 1870)

In 1841, George Augustus Selwyn was nominated as Bishop of New Zealand. He arrived in New Zealand in 1842 and began his job by designating the reverend William Bolland as Deacon for the parish of New Plymouth. Bishop Selwyn allocated to reverend Bolland an existing sandstone house, the former Captain J.G. Cooke's house, at Te Henui, as a residence for him and his family.

Te Henui Vicarage, as known today, is in fact an addition to the original house, between the two wings of the old building, dating from 1845. It was designed by the architect Frederick Thatcher, a London-trained architect, one of the first settlers arriving in New Zealand. Thatcher was an associate of the Royal Institute of British Architects and, since his arrival in New Plymouth in 1843, had designed a number of churches for Bishop George Selwyn. He was the architect for St Mary's Church and for the Colonial Hospital (now "The Gables").

William Bolland died of fever at the end of May 1847 and was succeeded by Henry Govett as vicar of St Mary's for the next fifty years, who would become the first Archdeacon of Taranaki. He lived at Te Henui Vicarage until the Taranaki Wars of the 1860s when he had to evacuate the building. Although the building survived these conflicts at a time when many others were destroyed in the fighting, Govett did not return to it. Some parts of the original sandstone sections of Te Henui disappeared after 1880 and wooden lean-tos were added to the central portion.

St Mary's curates, who looked after the Fitzroy end of the parish, continued to live there until the 1890s. After that, the Taranaki Anglican Church Trust Board kept ownership of the building until 1949, considering its great significance. But it was becoming increasingly expensive to keep the building in repair and the land surrounding it had been subdivided and sold. Finally, in 1949, the Te Henui vicarage, or all that remained of it, was purchased by the New Plymouth City Council.

The stone middle section was later restored by the New Zealand Historic Places Trust in the late 1960s and early 1970s. That restoration involved removing all additions to the original stone structure.

Since 1973, the building is used as a showroom by the New Plymouth Potters.

== Description ==
Te Henui Vicarage fits in the so-called "Antipodean Gothic" (or "Selwyn’s Gothic") style, similar to St Mary's Church from New Plymouth. The significant aesthetic value of the building comes from its simplicity. It has steeply pitched gables and it is constructed from local andesite, the same as St Mary's Church.

Beneath the apex of the gable of the front elevation, there is a carving of the coat of arms of Selwyn's undivided diocese of New Zealand (1841–1856). It is one of the very few examples of a building that features the symbol of the three stars in the designs for the crests of each of the present Anglican Diocese of New Zealand, dating from before the diocese was first subdivided in 1856.

== Image gallery ==
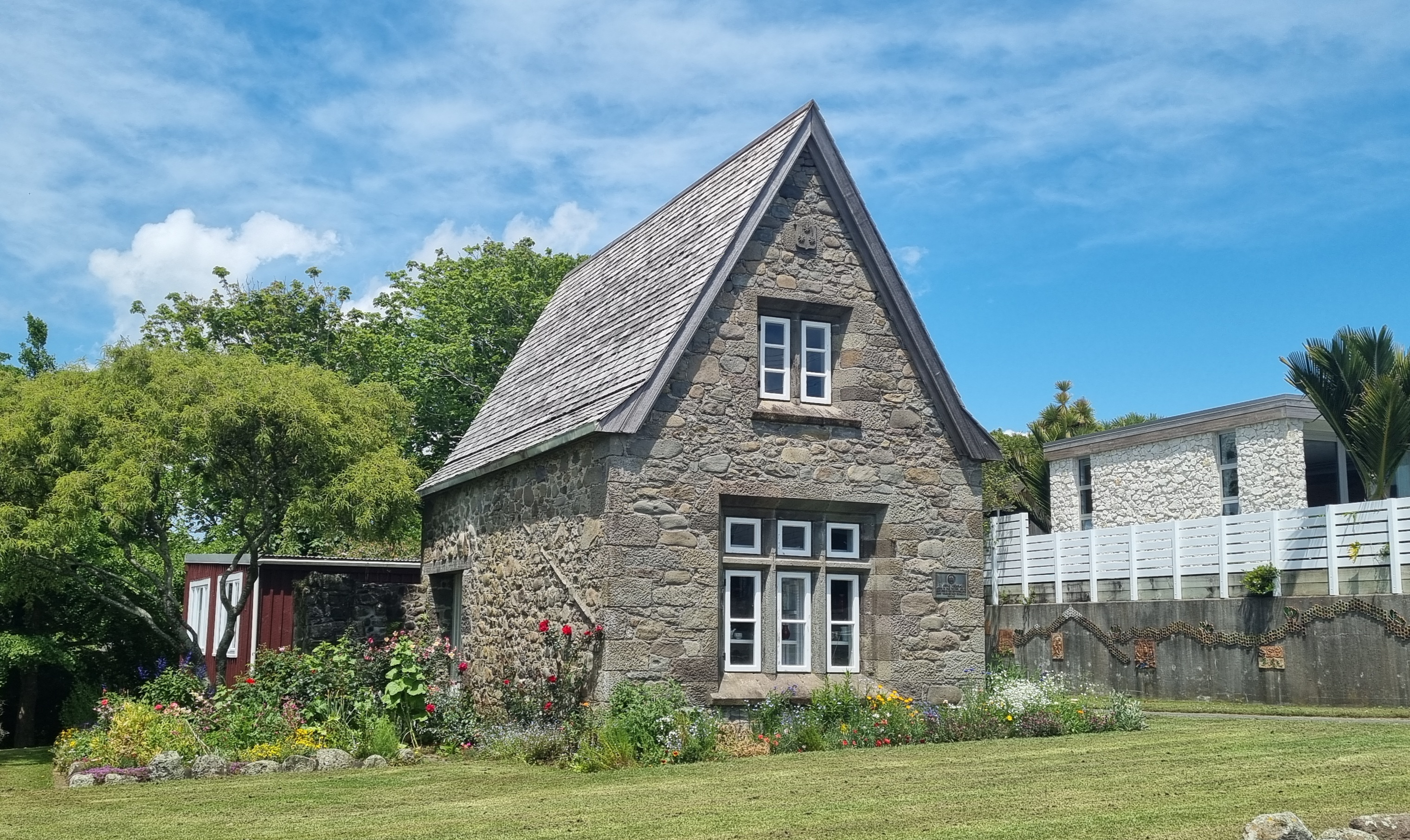
Te Henui Vicarage, north side

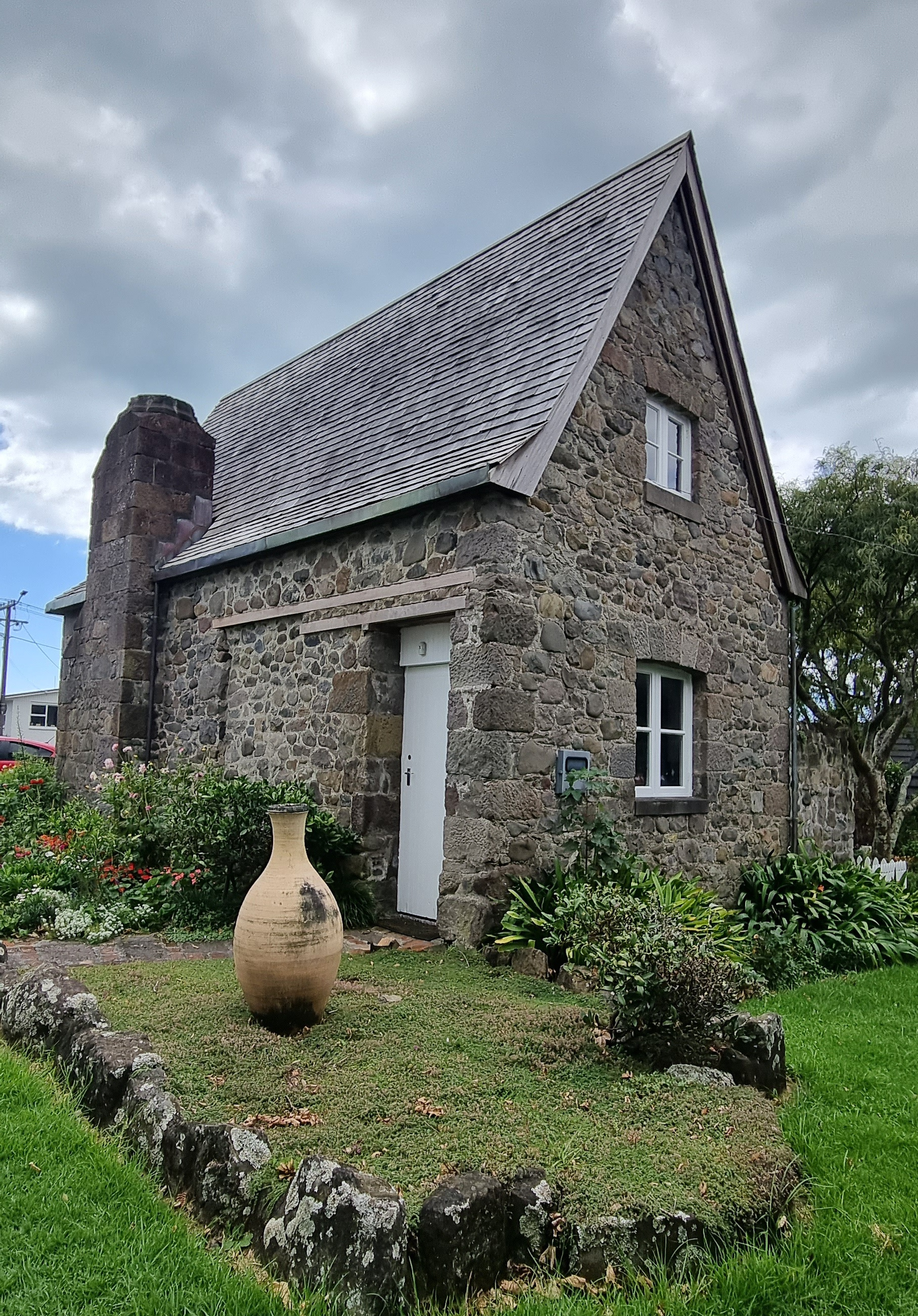
Te Henui Vicarage, south side

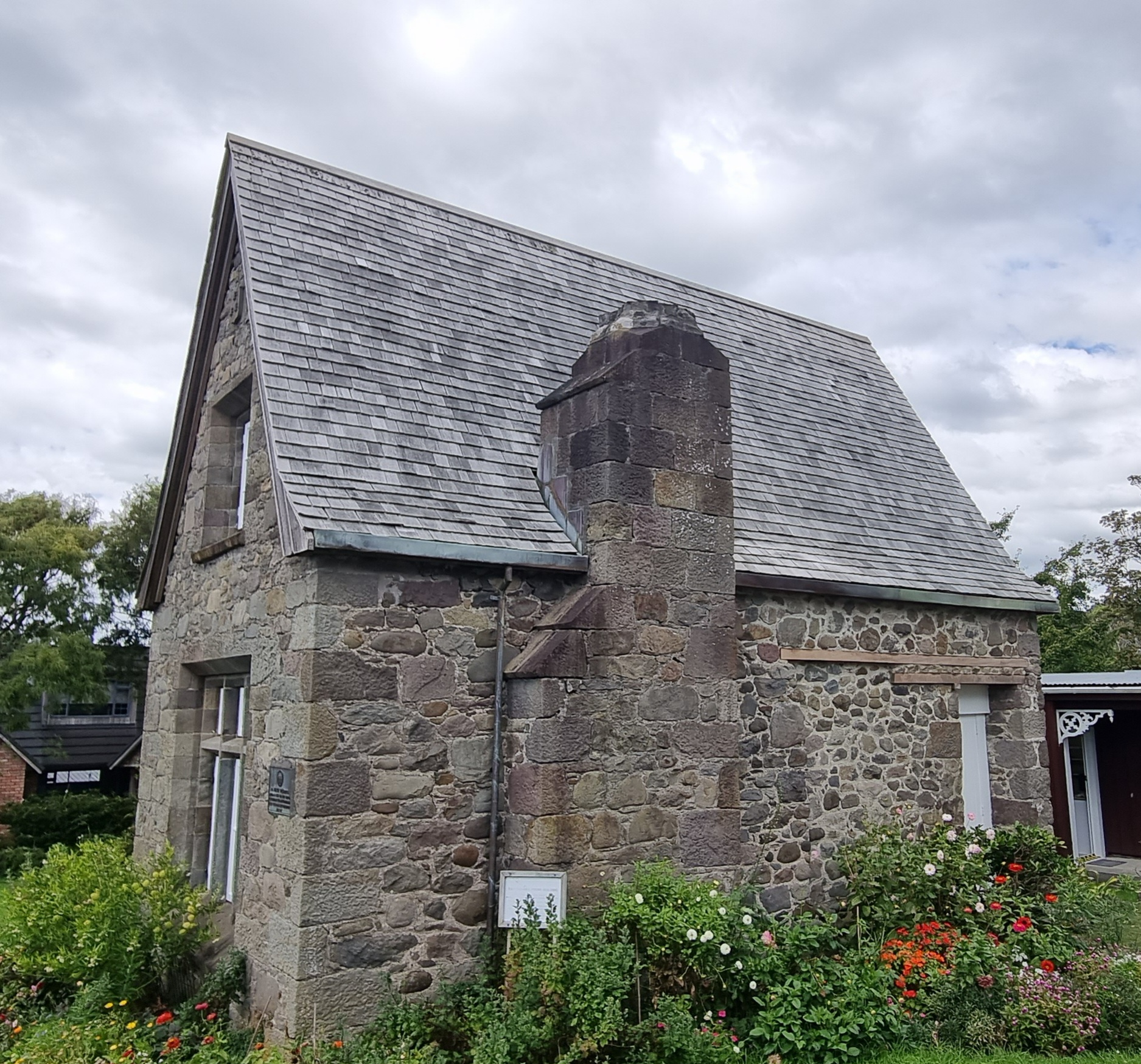
Te Henui Vicarage, west side

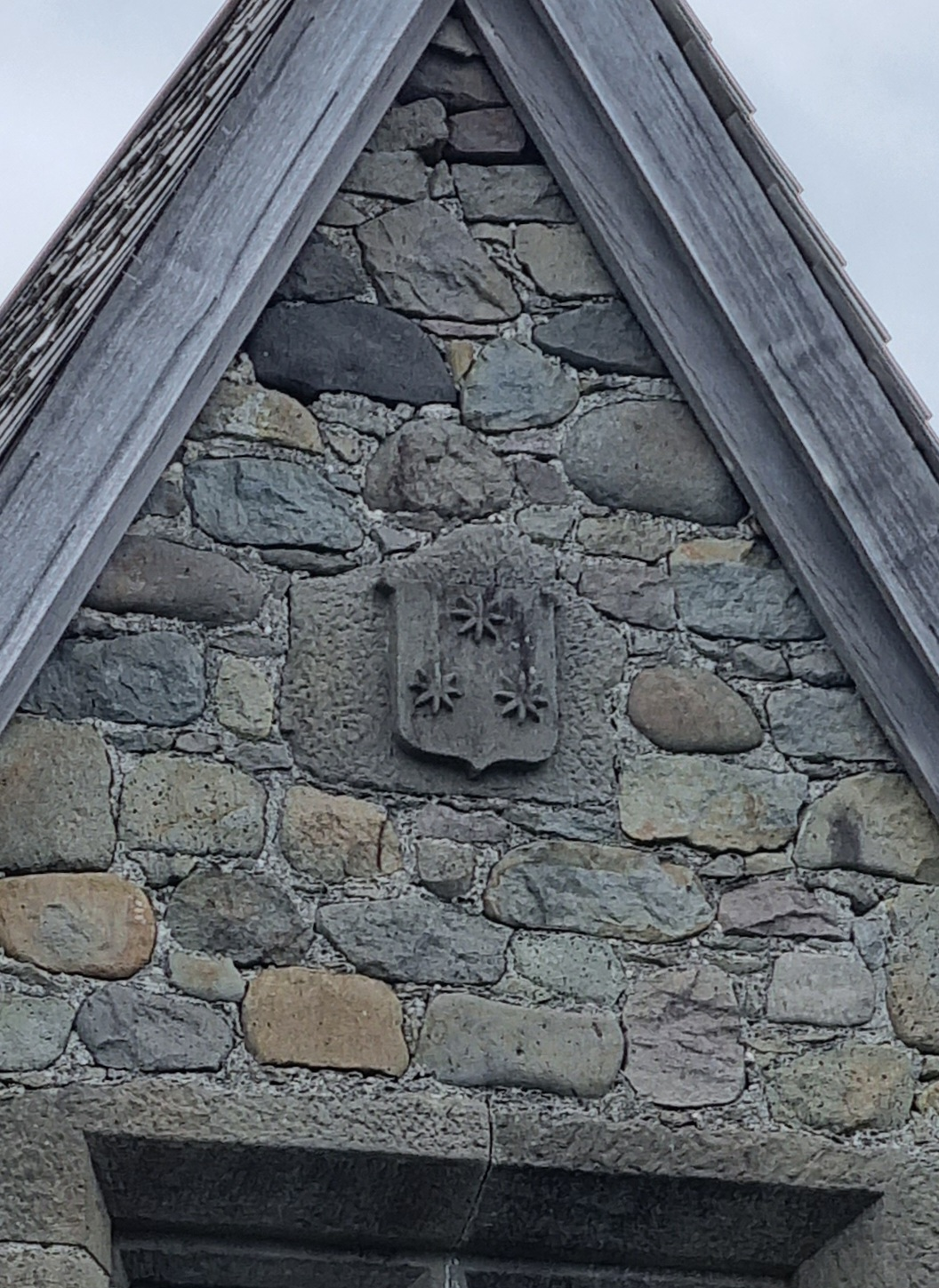
The symbol of the undivided diocese of New Zealand (1841–1856)

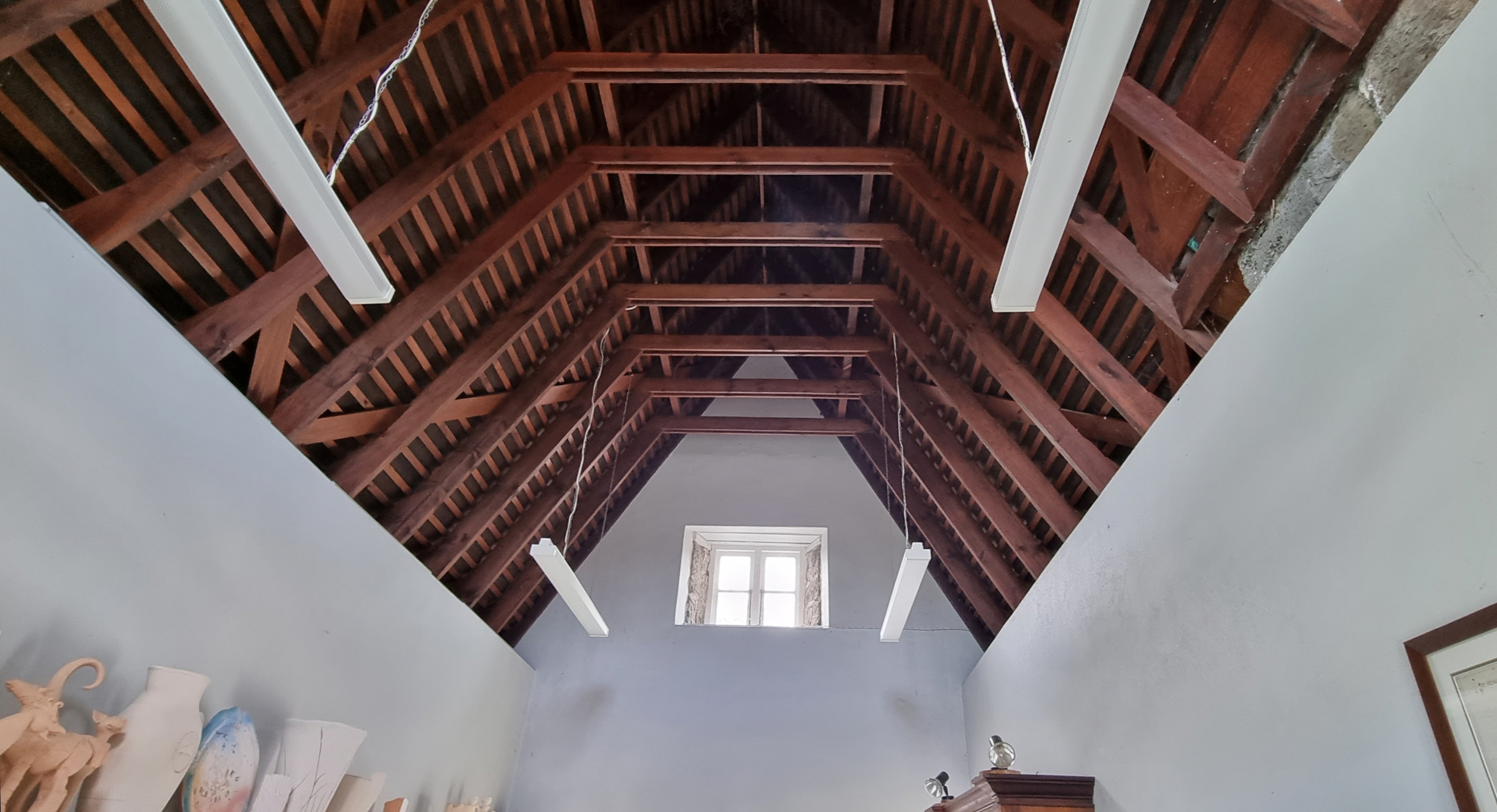
Te Henui Vicarage, the roof

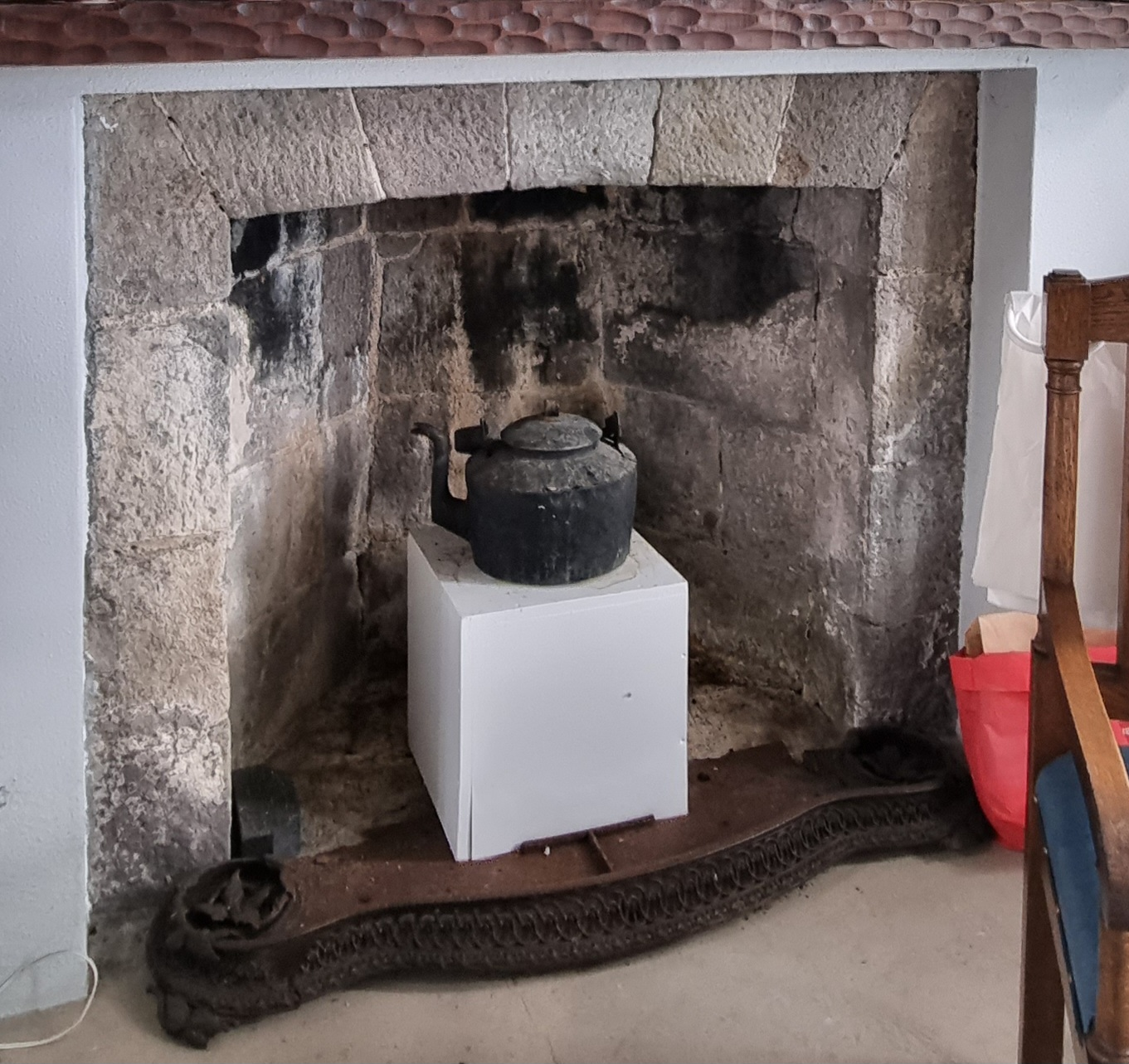
The old fireplace

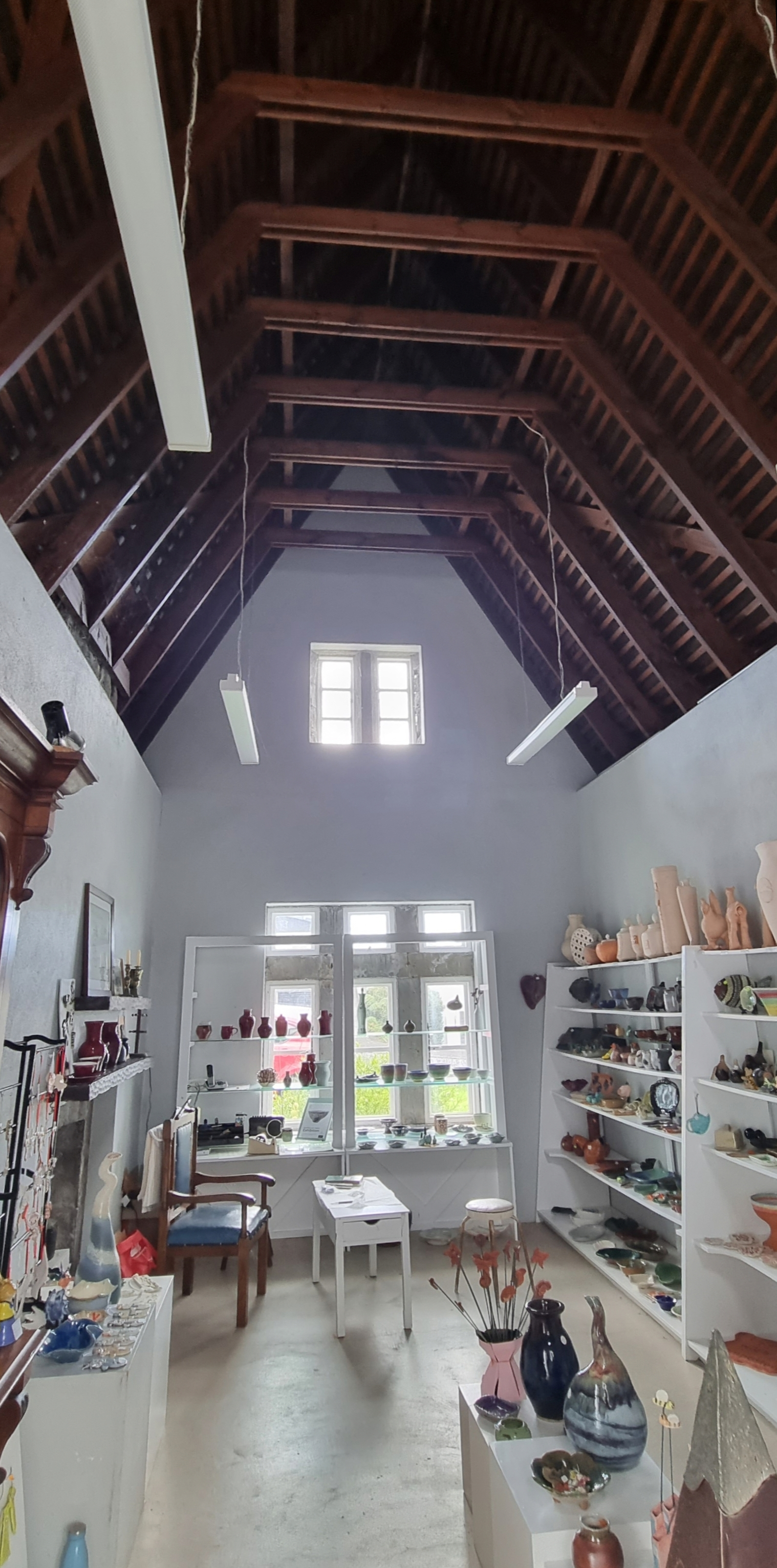
The pottery showroom inside

== Bibliography ==
- Heritage New Zealand, New Zealand Heritage List
- Porter, Frances; Historic Buildings of New Zealand: North Island, New Zealand Historic Places Trust, Auckland, N.Z., Methuen, 1983, ISBN 0456031103
