= Kinder House =

Heritage building in Auckland, New Zealand

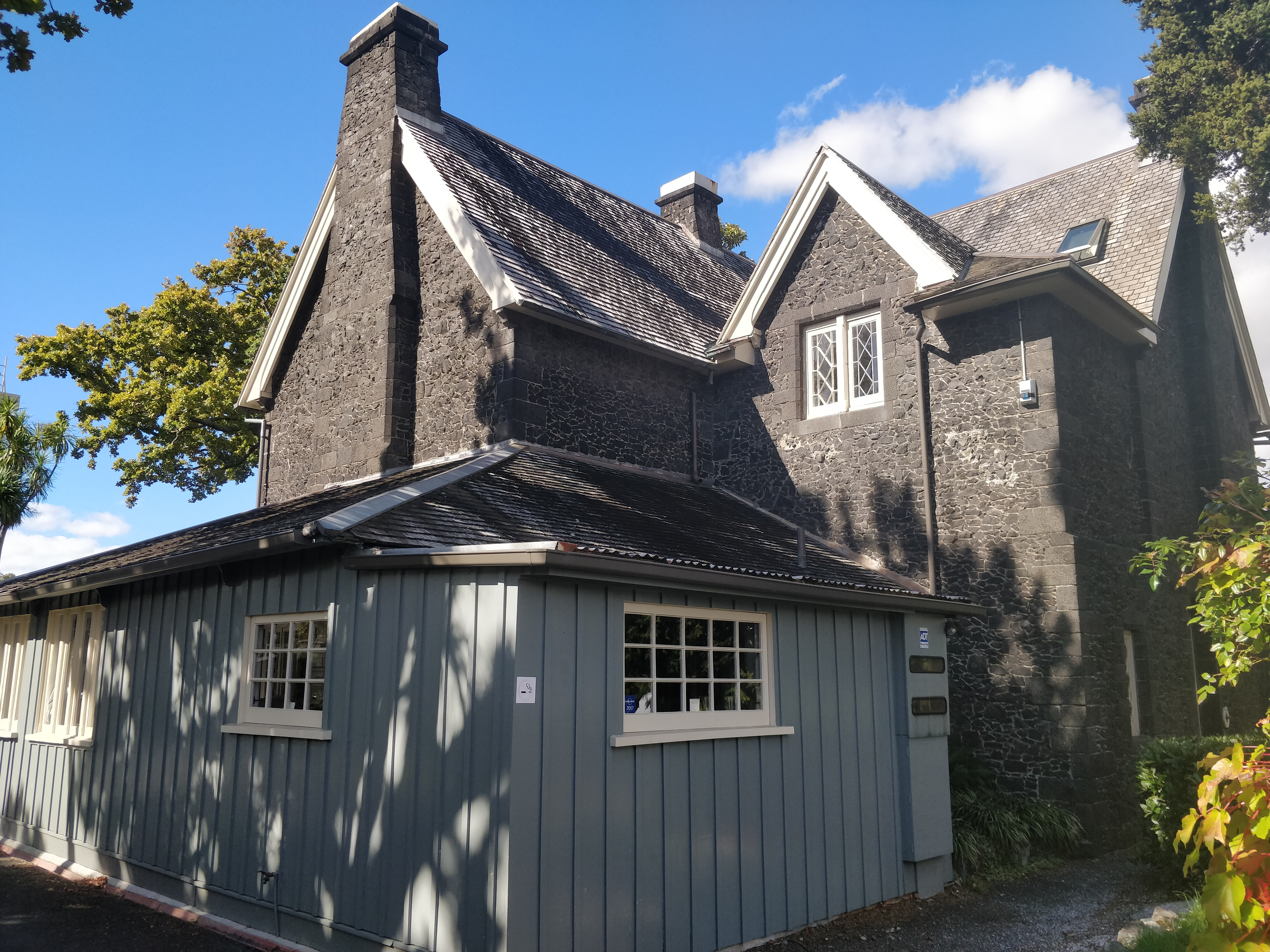
- John Kinder House in 2021
- Interactive map of the Kinder House area

General information
- Location: Ayr Street, Parnell, Auckland, New Zealand
- Coordinates: 36.861982°S 174.782409°E

Heritage New Zealand – Category 1
- Designated: 11-Nov-1985
- Reference no.: 110

Kinder House is a historic house on Ayr Street, in the suburb of Parnell, Auckland, New Zealand.

== History ==
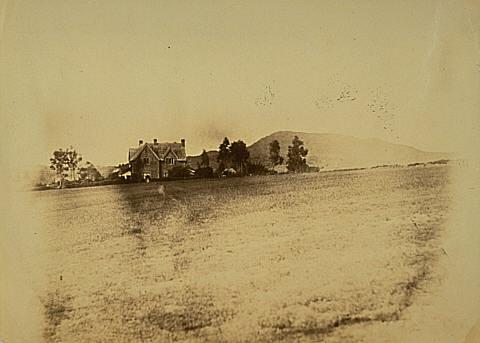
A photograph of Kinder House taken by John Kinder, the owner.

Kinder House, sometimes known as "The Headmaster's House" was built in 1857. It was commissioned by Bishop George Selwyn and designed by Frederick Thatcher, architect of many Anglican buildings in Auckland. The house is a Gothic-style, double-storey mansion built of grey volcanic stone quarried from nearby Mount Eden.

The house was the residence of London-born John Kinder (1819 – 1903), an Anglican priest, painter, photographer and headmaster of the Church of England Grammar School, Parnell. He occupied the house with his wife and the six children of his brother Henry Kinder, who was murdered in 1865 by John's sister-in-law and her lover.

The house was opened to the public as a gallery in 1982. The house is also used for wedding receptions and other functions. In 2012, leading landscape photographers from New Zealand and abroad exhibited New Zealand landscape photography at a Kinder House exhibition organized by the Contemporary Photography Foundation, during the Auckland Festival of Photography.

== Reported haunting ==
It is claimed that the house is haunted by the apparition of a man. Because of this, it was visited by a team of paranormal investigators in 2005 and featured on Ghost Hunt, a New Zealand television show.
