= Frederick Thatcher =

English architect and clergyman (1814-1890)

Reverend Frederick Thatcher
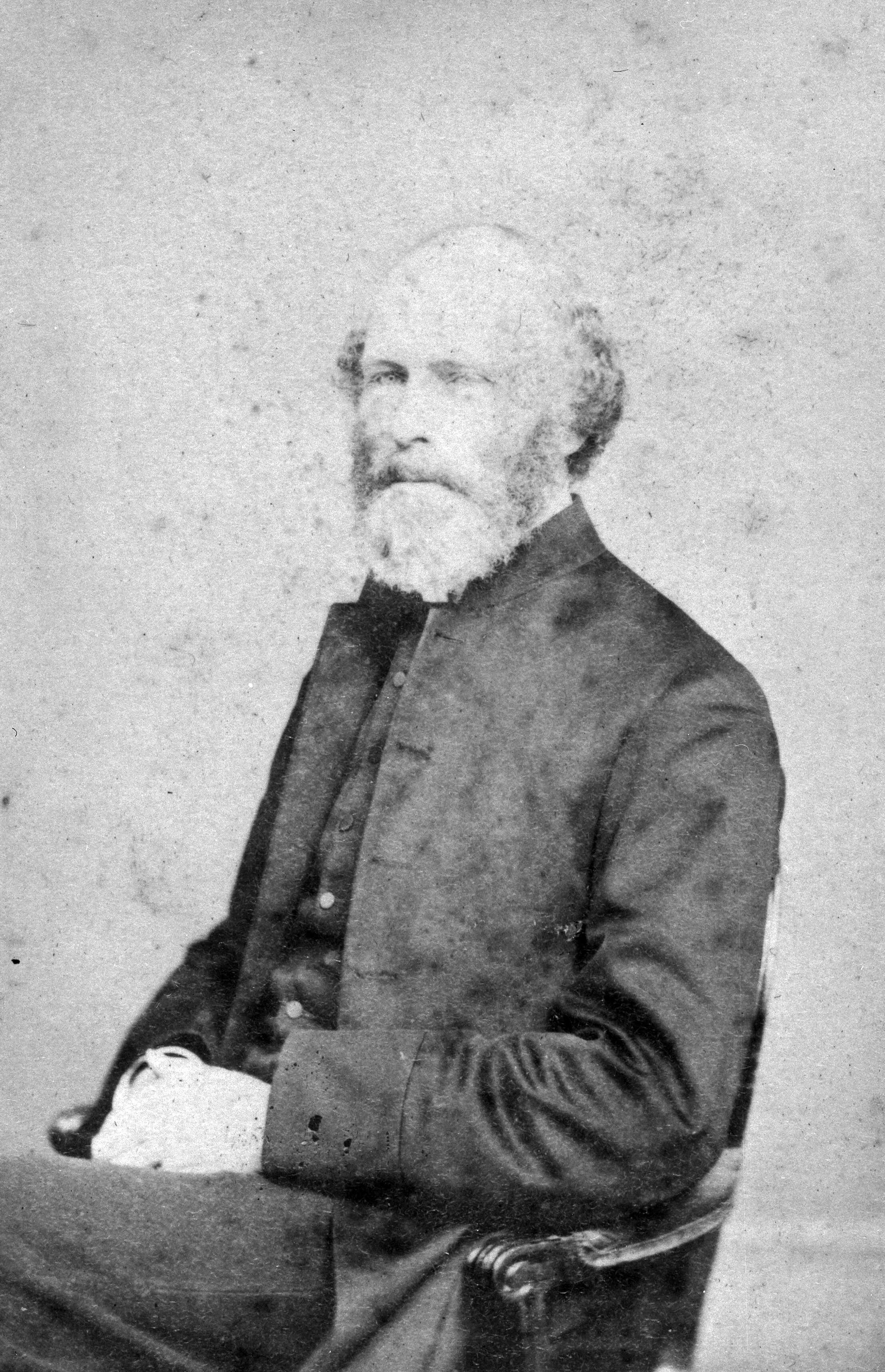
- Born: 5 September 1814; Hastings, Sussex, England
- Died: 19 October 1890 (aged 76); Bakewell, Derbyshire, England
- Resting place: Lichfield Cathedral
- Occupations: Architect, vicar, secretary
- Religion: Anglican

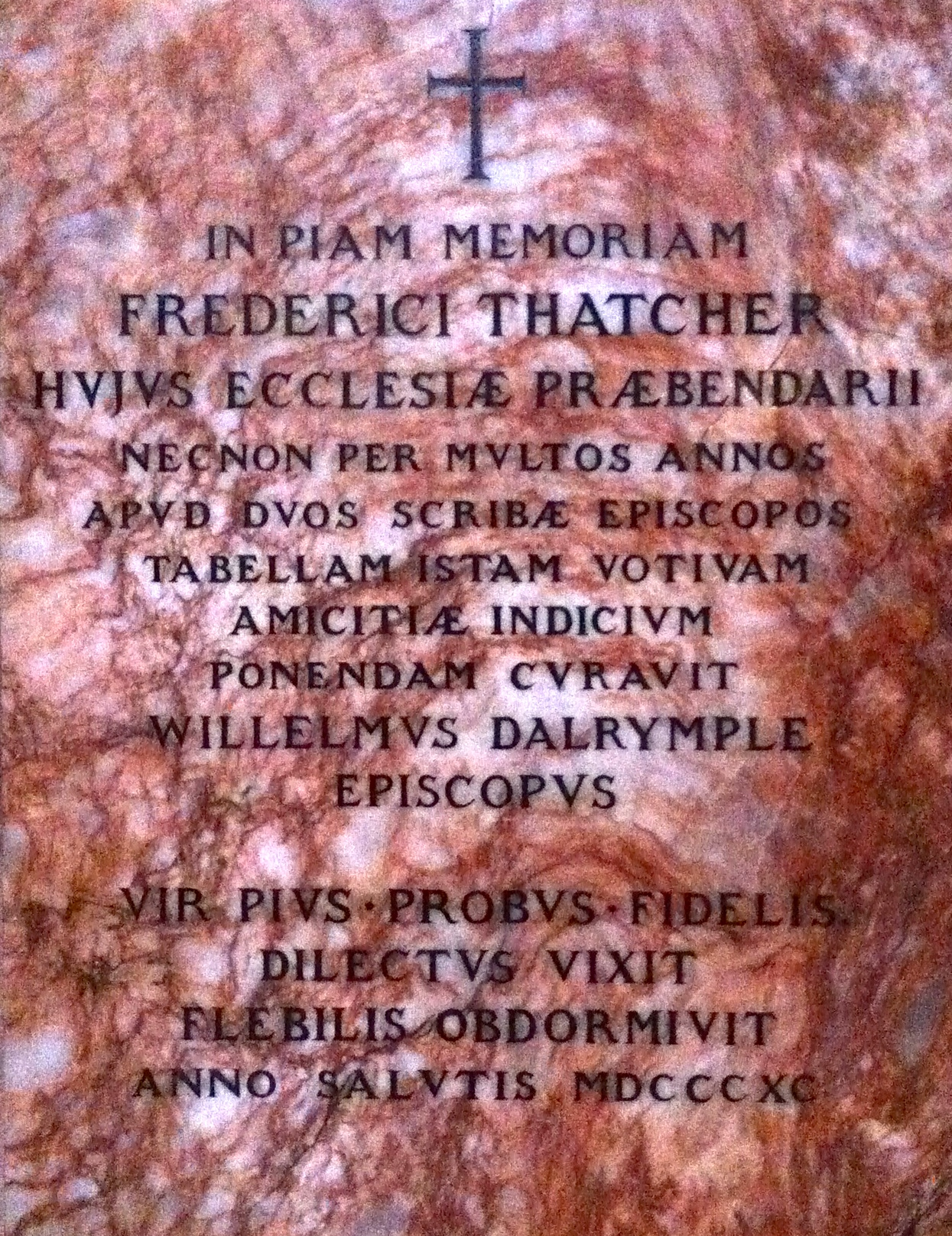
Memorial to Frederick Thatcher in Lichfield Cathedral

The Reverend Frederick Thatcher (5 September 1814 – 19 October 1890) was an English and New Zealand architect and clergyman.

== Early life ==
Frederick Thatcher was born in Hastings, Sussex, England, 5 September 1814. Thatcher's mother was landed, his father was a riding officer. At 16 years old Thatcher articled to a London architect, Alfred Bartholomew. Six years later Thatcher established his own architectural and surveying practice. In 1836 Thatcher became an associate member of the Institute of British Architects of London.

Thatcher married Elizabeth Watt on 30 June 1840 but she and an infant son died in 1842. After the deaths of his wife and son, Thatcher purchased rural land near New Plymouth from the New Zealand Company. With his brother-in-law Isaac Newton Watt, he left England in 1843 aboard the barque Himalaya and arrived in New Plymouth on 23 December 1843.

== Life in New Zealand ==
In New Plymouth Thatcher became associated with George Selwyn, the Bishop of New Zealand, and engaged in architectural work. In 1845 Thatcher left for Auckland where he became superintendent of public works and a lieutenant in the Auckland Militia. He served as Sir George Grey's secretary from 1846 until 1848 when he enrolled in St John's College, Auckland. On 6 November 1849, at St Mary's, Taranaki, he married Caroline Wright. Thatcher remained at St John's College until 1853 when he was ordained as a priest. Thatcher was appointed vicar of St Matthew's parish in Auckland and retired from the position in 1856 on account of ailing health and returned to England with his family.

== Return to New Zealand ==
In England Thatcher was working as a curate in Northamptonshire. On 14 August 1861 Thatcher had returned to New Zealand with his family. Bishop Selwyn appointed him vicar of St Paul's Church, Thorndon. As vicar he was the architect for the design of St Paul's Cathedral. Thatcher resigned from the parish due to poor health and on 25 October 1864 went to Auckland to work as Governor George Grey's secretary again. When Grey's term as governor ended in 1868 Thatcher returned to England to be with his wife and son.

== Return to England and retirement ==
After Thatcher's return to England he worked as secretary to the Bishop of Lichfield, which at the time was held by Selwyn. Following Selwyn's death Thatcher assisted Charles Abraham with founding Selwyn College, Cambridge. Afterwards, from 1883, he was prebendary of Lichfield Cathedral.

Thatcher died on 19 October 1890 at Bakewell, Derbyshire. Thatcher was buried at Lichfield Cathedral near Selwyn's grave.

== Architectural career ==
Thatcher mostly designed churches, although he did work on Mansion House for George Grey. Thatcher's ecclesiastical designs were in the Gothic Revival style and he assisted Bishop Selwyn in designing the Selwyn churches. In addition to his work on St Paul's Cathedral Thatcher also designed St John's Church, Trentham as well as six other churches during his time as vicar of St Paul's. Other notable works from Thatcher include St Mary's Church, New Plymouth, The Gables, Christ Church, Nelson, and St Mary's Church, Parnell, Kinder House, and Selwyn Court.

== List of buildings ==
Name	Date	Image	Note	Ref
Workhouse	1840		The workhouse became a hospital in 1948, private residence since 1990. Located in Battle, East Sussex	
Te Henui Vicarage	1845		Registered as a category 1 building with Heritage New Zealand	
Taranaki Cathedral	1846		Registered as a category 1 building with Heritage New Zealand	
Auckland Colonial Hospital	1847		Demolished	
The Gables Colonial Hospital	1848		Registered as a category 1 building with Heritage New Zealand	
Christ Church, Nelson	1851		Demolished	
St Matthews Church	1853		Building on left. Demolished	
Kinder House	1857		Registered as a category 1 building with Heritage New Zealand	
St Stephen's Chapel, Auckland	1857		Registered as a category 1 building with Heritage New Zealand	
St Mary's Church, Parnell	1860		Demolished	
Selwyn Library	1861		Registered as a category 1 building with Heritage New Zealand	
Selwyn Court	1861–1865		Registered as a category 1 historic place with Heritage New Zealand	
St John's Church, Trentham	1863		Registered as a category 2 building with Heritage New Zealand	
St John's Church, Johnsonville	1864		Demolished	
Old St Paul's, Wellington	1866		Registered as a category 1 building with Heritage New Zealand	
St Peter's Church, Tawa Flat	1866		Demolished	
Bolton Street Cemetery mortuary chapel	1866		Demolished but a replica rebuilt in 1990	
St Matthias' Church, Makara	1867		Demolished in 1920	
Holy Trinity Church, Ohariu Valley	1870		Registered as a category 2 building with Heritage New Zealand	
Government House, Wellington	1865		Designed an addition for the building	
Mansion House, Kawau Island	1865		Designed an addition for the building	
St Mary's Church, Karori	1866		Credited to Thatcher by Heritage New Zealand and Margaret Alington but attributed to Nicholas Marchant by Geoffrey Mew and Adrian Humphris. Demolished in 1925	
