= The Gables Colonial Hospital =

Heritage hospital building in New Plymouth, New Zealand

The Gables Colonial Hospital New Plymouth
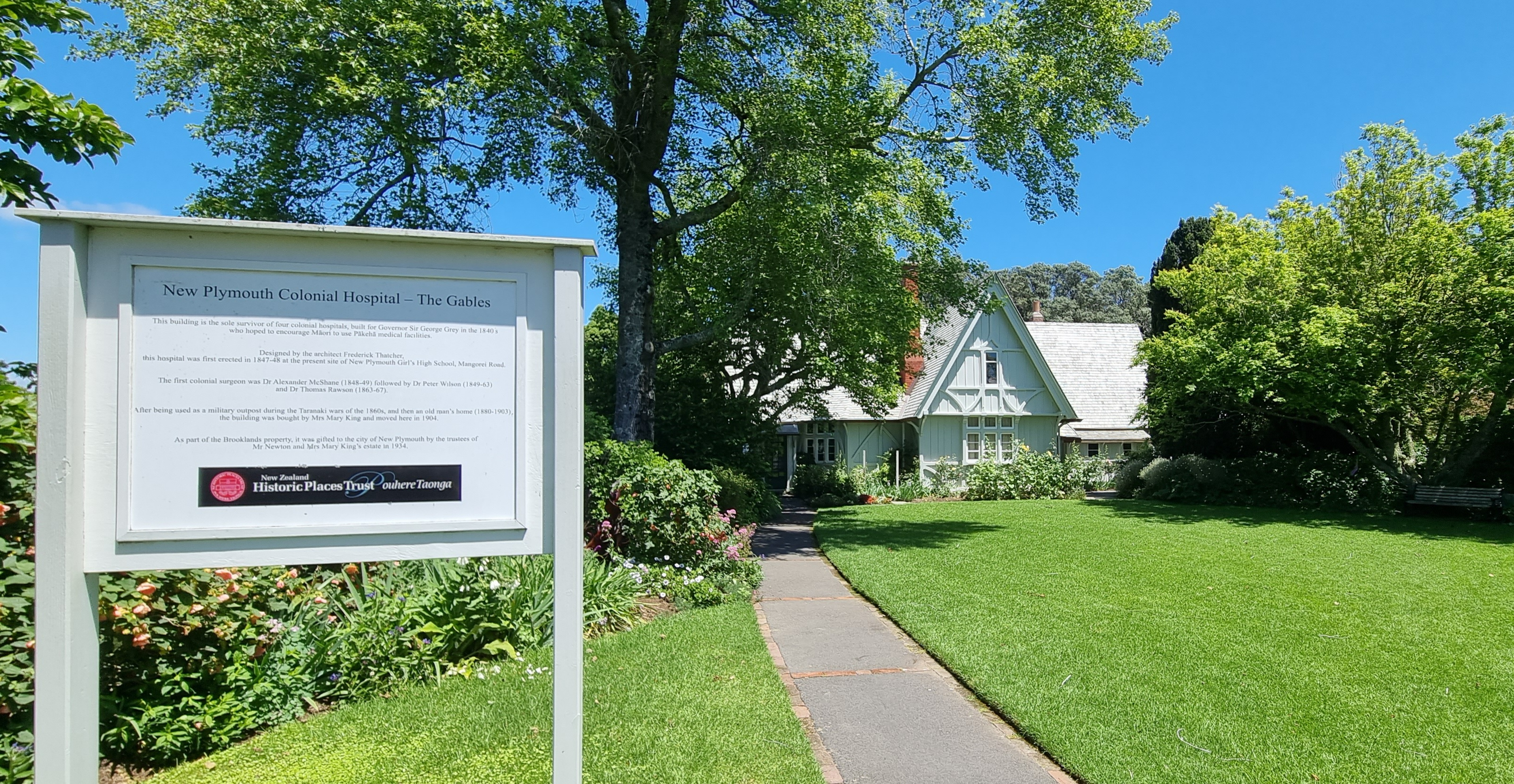
- Interactive map of the The Gables Colonial Hospital; New Plymouth area

General information
- Architectural style: Gothic
- Location: Brooklands Park Drive, New Plymouth, New Zealand
- Coordinates: 39.068907°S 174.08174°E
- Current tenants: North Taranaki Arts Society
- Construction started: 1847
- Completed: 1848
- Owner: New Plymouth District Council

Design and construction
- Architect: Frederick Thatcher

Heritage New Zealand – Category 1
- Designated: 24 November 1983
- Reference no.: 29

The Gables in New Plymouth's Brooklands Park was a colonial hospital originally built in Mangorei Road, on the northern bank of Te Hēnui Stream. It was one of the four hospitals Governor Sir George Grey commissioned in the late 1840s. Now an arts centre (since 1985), the building is historically important as it reminds of the first attempt to provide quality medical care to all New Zealanders and of Governor Sir George Grey's policy of assimilation by establishing mixed hospitals. The building also has rarity value as it is the last remaining of the four original hospitals. It is architecturally important as well, being one of the earliest surviving buildings designed by an architect in New Zealand.

The Gables Colonial Hospital is one of the heritage buildings of the city, registered in 1983 by Heritage New Zealand as a Category 1 Historic Place.

== History ==
In 1846, on the direction of Governor Sir George Grey, four hospitals were planned to be built in the North Island, in Auckland, Wellington, Whanganui and New Plymouth. The hospitals were built to provide medical care for both the indigenous Mãori and settlers, furthering the assimilation of the Maori people into the nascent colonial society. The New Plymouth hospital was the third of the four hospitals erected in the North Island.

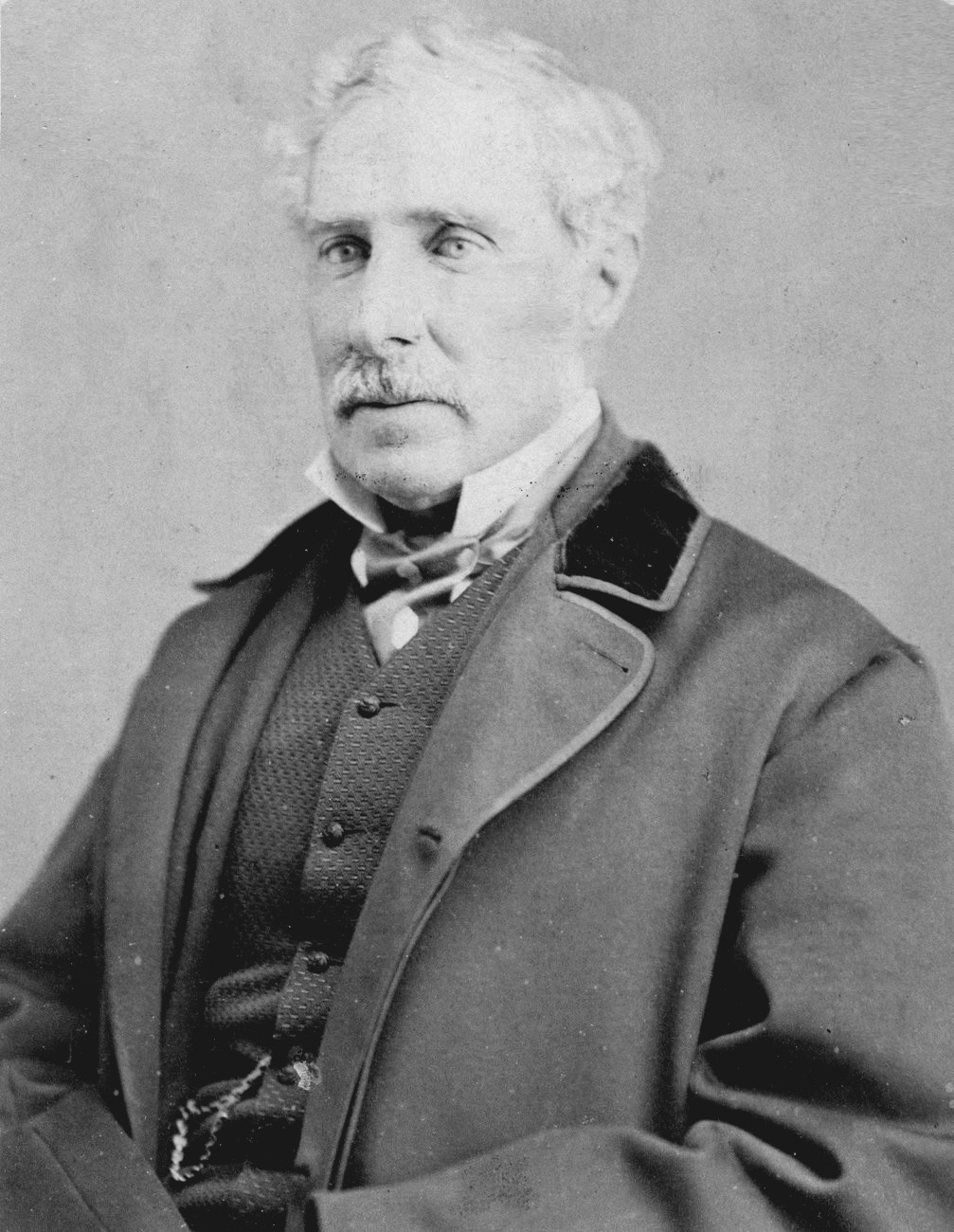
Governor Sir George Grey

The hospital site was chosen to be on five acres (2 ha) on the northern bank of Te Hēnui Stream, surveyed in December 1846, and then sold to the Colonial Secretary.

The hospital was designed by Frederick Thatcher, a London-trained architect and an associate of the Royal Institute of British Architects. Since Thatcher's arrival in New Plymouth in 1843, he had designed a number of churches for Anglican Bishop George Selwyn. Thatcher based his design on a plan he conceived in 1841 for a vicarage in Sussex, England. He prepared the specifications for the hospital building, featuring steeply pitched roofs and decorative cross-bracing typical of the Anglo-Gothic style. All the stonework was to be "hard beach stone", the timber heart rimu, the floor Baltic pine, and the roof was to be sheathed with shingles. About twenty tonnes of limestone and 15,000 bricks came on the government brig Victoria from Nelson.

The hospital was built by carpenter George Robinson and stonemasons Thomas Rusden and Samuel Curtis. Situated in Mangorei Road, on the northern bank of Te Hēnui Stream, the hospital had three wards, a surgery, a dispensary, an attic room as servants' quarters and a "dead house" or mortuary, accommodated in a small building nearby.

When finished in September 1848, the hospital was handed over to Captain Henry King, Resident magistrate. It was an architecturally pleasing building, but, unfortunately, the internal arrangements were mostly sacrificed to the Elizabethan style of its external decorations. The most versatile building was the "dead house" (mortuary), adjacent to the main building, which was initially used for isolation cases.

The two colonial surgeons who worked in the hospital both found it inconvenient, poorly appointed, and cold. The first Colonial Surgeon at New Plymouth was Alexander MacShane, appointed at 19 September 1848. In the first year, he treated 55 inpatients and 570 outpatients, the majority of them Maori, and administered 380 smallpox vaccinations.

MacShane died in 1848 and a new doctor, Peter Wilson, born in Scotland, took up his post. Wilson had served in the Anglo-American War of 1812 as a naval surgeon and later at the military and civilian hospital at Gibraltar. Wilson travelled in Morocco before immigrating to New Zealand. Replacing McShane as Colonial Surgeon, he discovered that, while being a very nice building, the hospital was completely impractical. The hospital wards were too small and very cold in winter and lacked a washhouse as well. Wilson erected a circular veranda in the front door of the dispensary in 1850 to facilitate out-patient treatment and converted the dead house into a much needed washhouse.

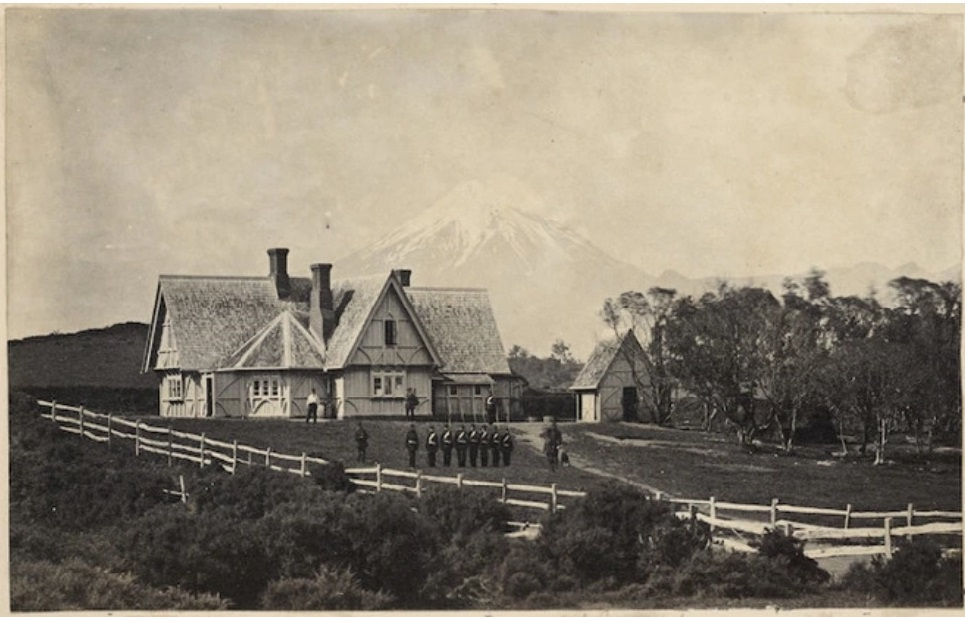
The Colonial Hospital (ca.1863-1865)

Soon, the hospital gained an excellent reputation among Maori. In August 1854, Rawiri Waiaua, a Puketapu chief and Native Assessor, was shot during a confrontation and brought to the hospital for treatment, but soon died and a tapu was placed on the hospital. This caused complications and, as a result, patient attendance decreased seriously, although a high number of people were treated as outpatients.

Wilston died in 1863, and Thomas Edward Rawson was appointed in his place, but during the Taranaki Wars the colonial hospital was seldom used for its original purpose. Eventually the little-used hospital was converted into a military outpost.

In 1867 a new Provincial Hospital was opened in New Plymouth and the old building at Hēnui was transferred to the Taranaki Provincial Council. During a smallpox scare in 1872, the hospital was Taranaki's quarantine station for a brief period. Apart from that, the building was not used and neglected until 1880 when it was converted into "The Refuge", a home for old men, under the direction of the Taranaki Hospital and Charitable Aid Board.

When the refuge was closed in 1903 for economic reasons, the local preservation society campaigned to retain the building on historical grounds. The building was auctioned the following year and was purchased by Mary King, the wife of business man Newton King, for £10. As per the New Plymouth Borough and Taranaki Hospital Exchange Act from 1903, the former colonial hospital land became an educational reserve and future site of the New Plymouth Girls’ High School.

The hospital building was removed from its Hēnui site, renamed "The Gables" and moved to Brooklands, the former estate of Captain Henry King, who was in charge of the hospital 56 years earlier. The King family lived in the house until the death of Mrs King in 1934, when it was offered to the city of New Plymouth. Private tenants leased the building until 1983, when a restoration of the building commenced which lasted for two years. After that, it was re-opened as an arts centre in 1985. Owned by the New Plymouth District Council, "The Gables" is now the gallery for the North Taranaki Society of the Arts. Another renovation of the building took place in 2017, when the original shingle roof was replaced with the same cedar shingles, imported from Canada.

== Image gallery ==
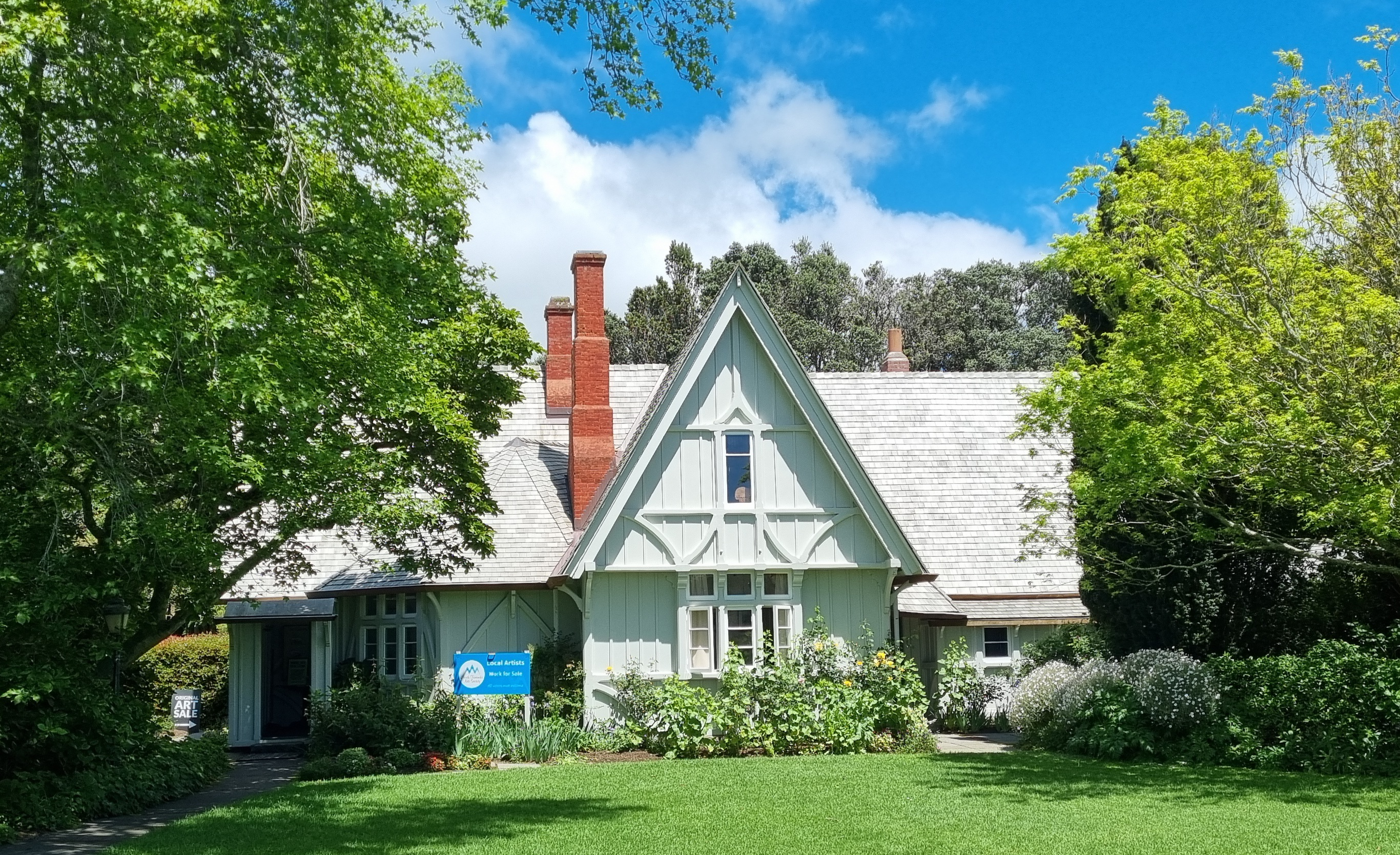

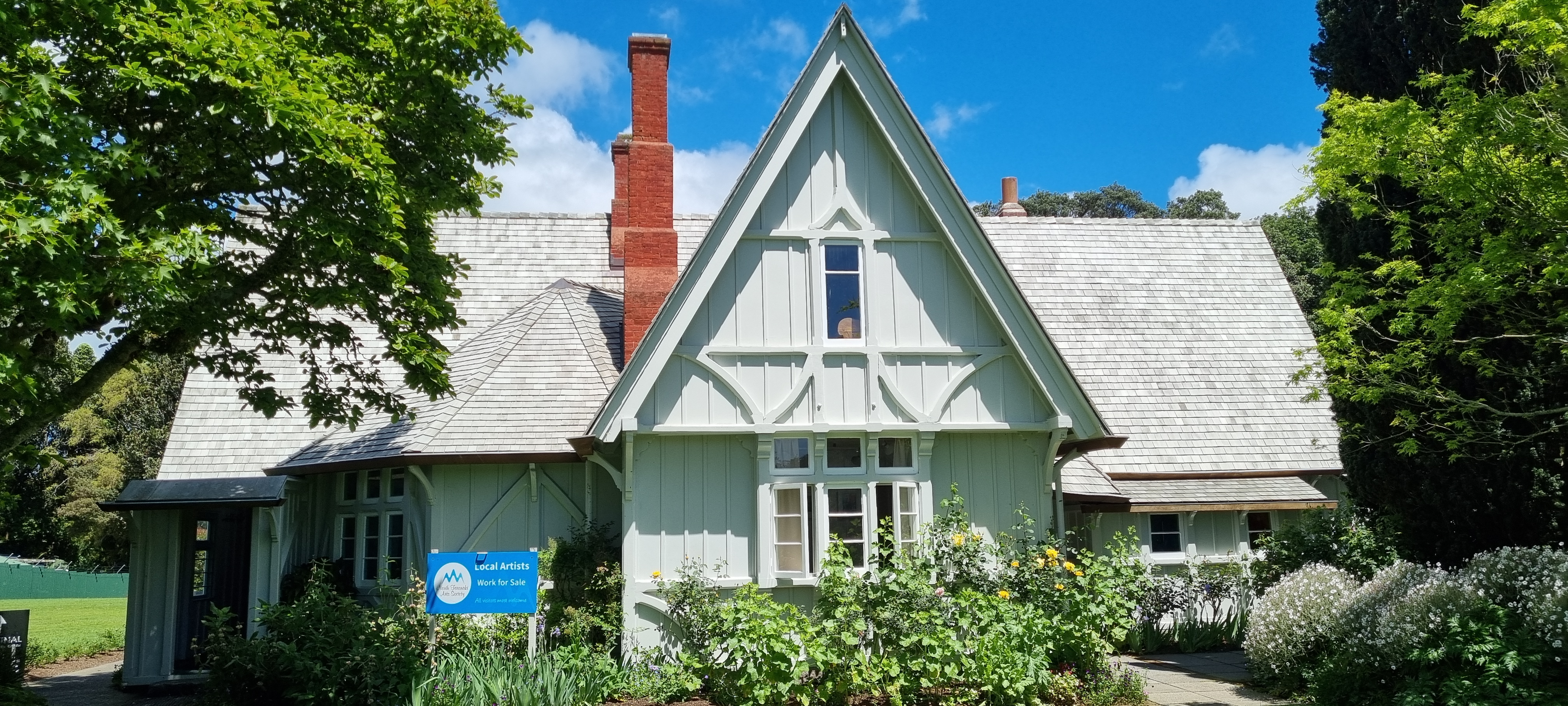

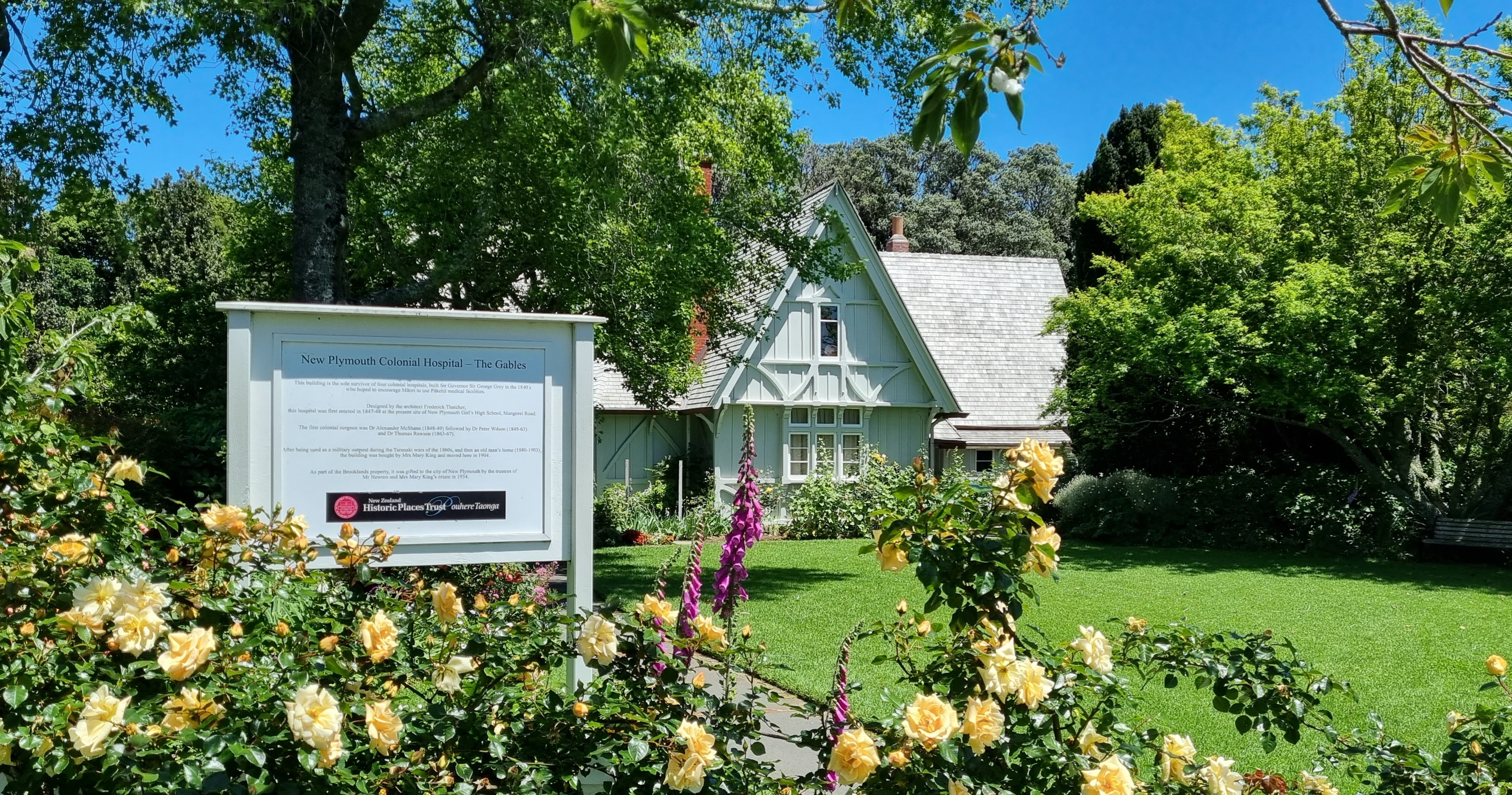

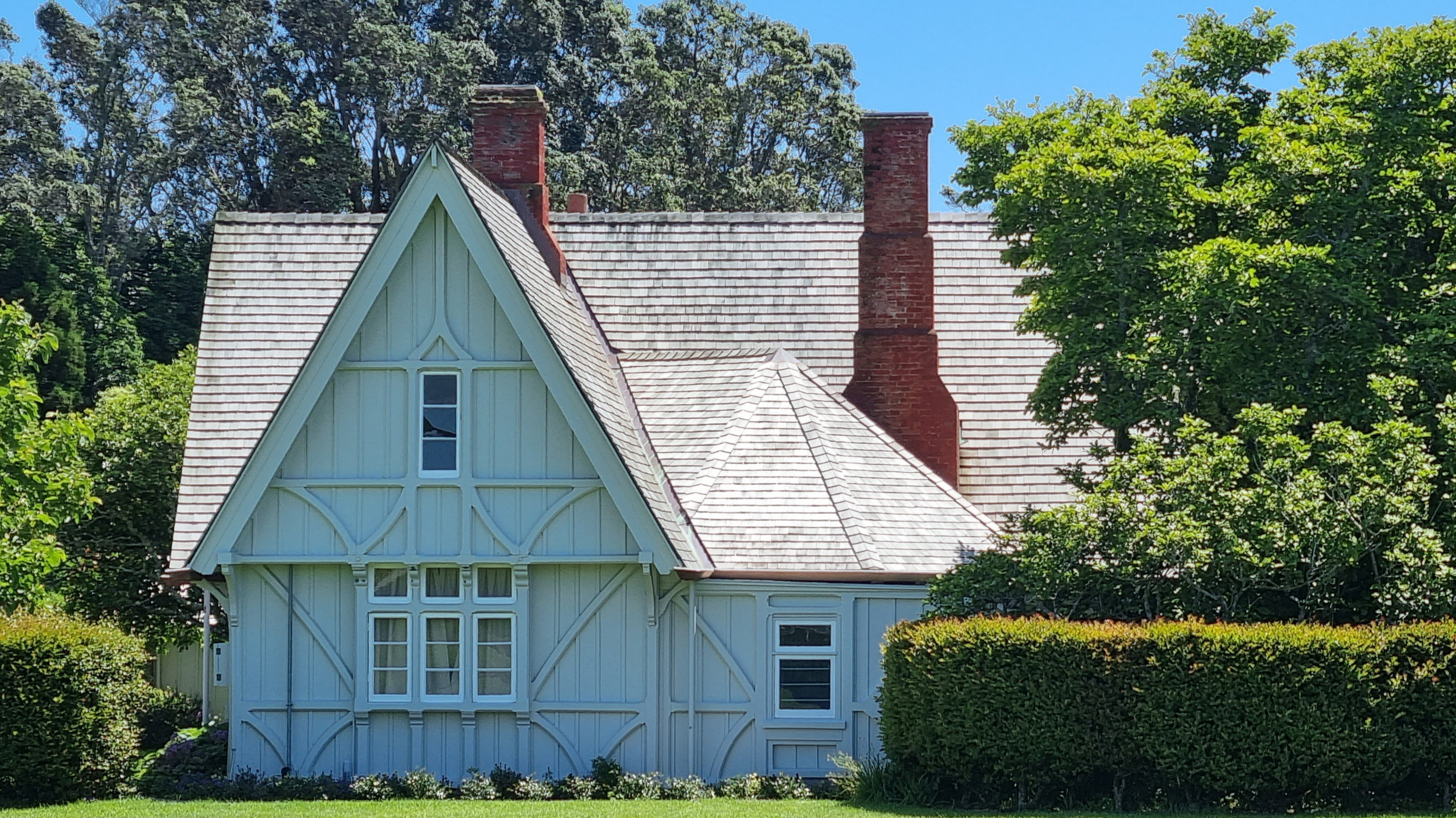

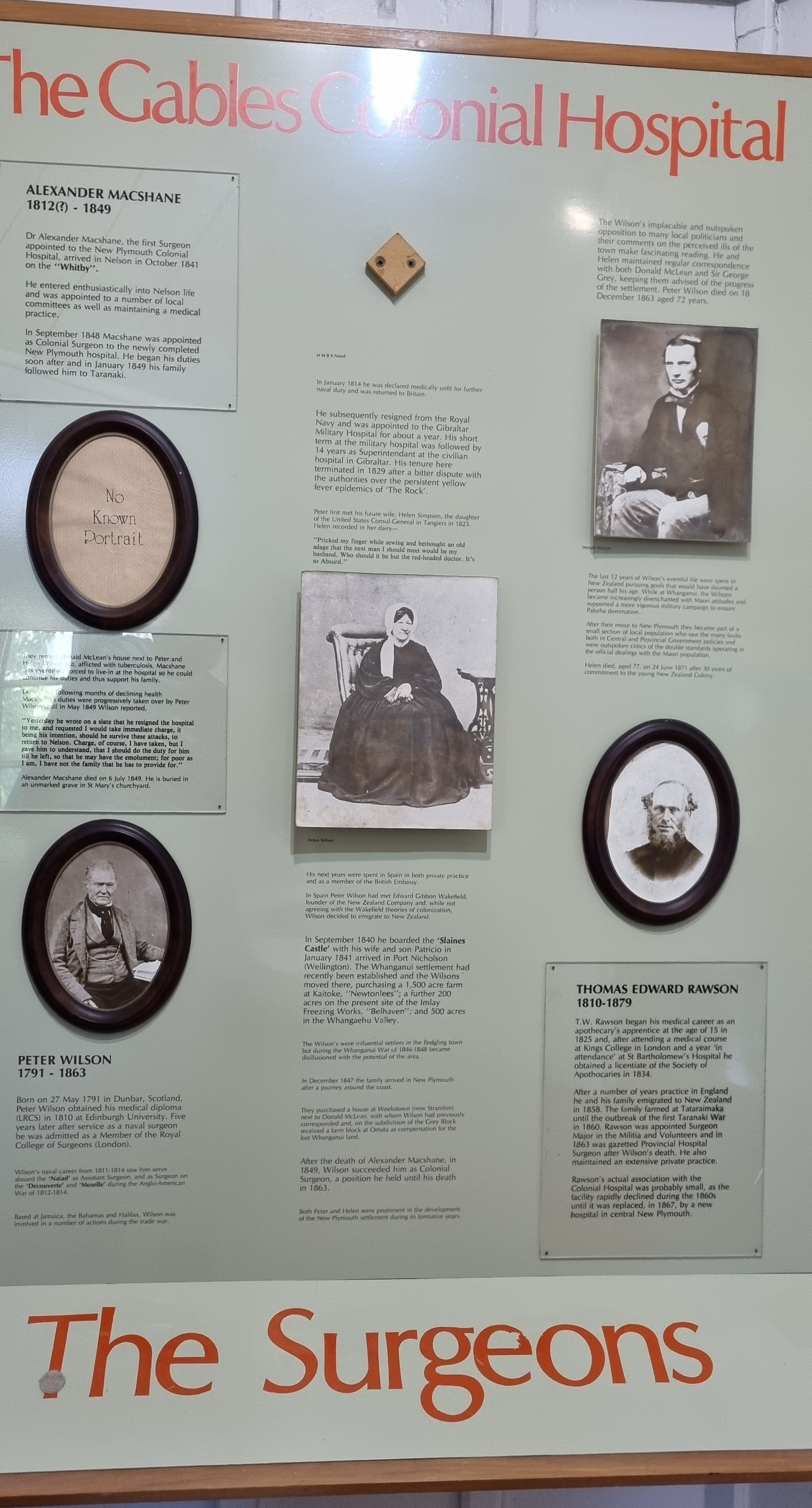
The surgeons

== Bibliography ==
- Heritage New Zealand, New Zealand Heritage List
- Porter, Frances; Historic Buildings of New Zealand: North Island, New Zealand Historic Places Trust, Auckland, N.Z., Cassell Ltd., 1979, ISBN 0908572115
