= Selwyn Court =

Category 1 historic place in Auckland, New Zealand

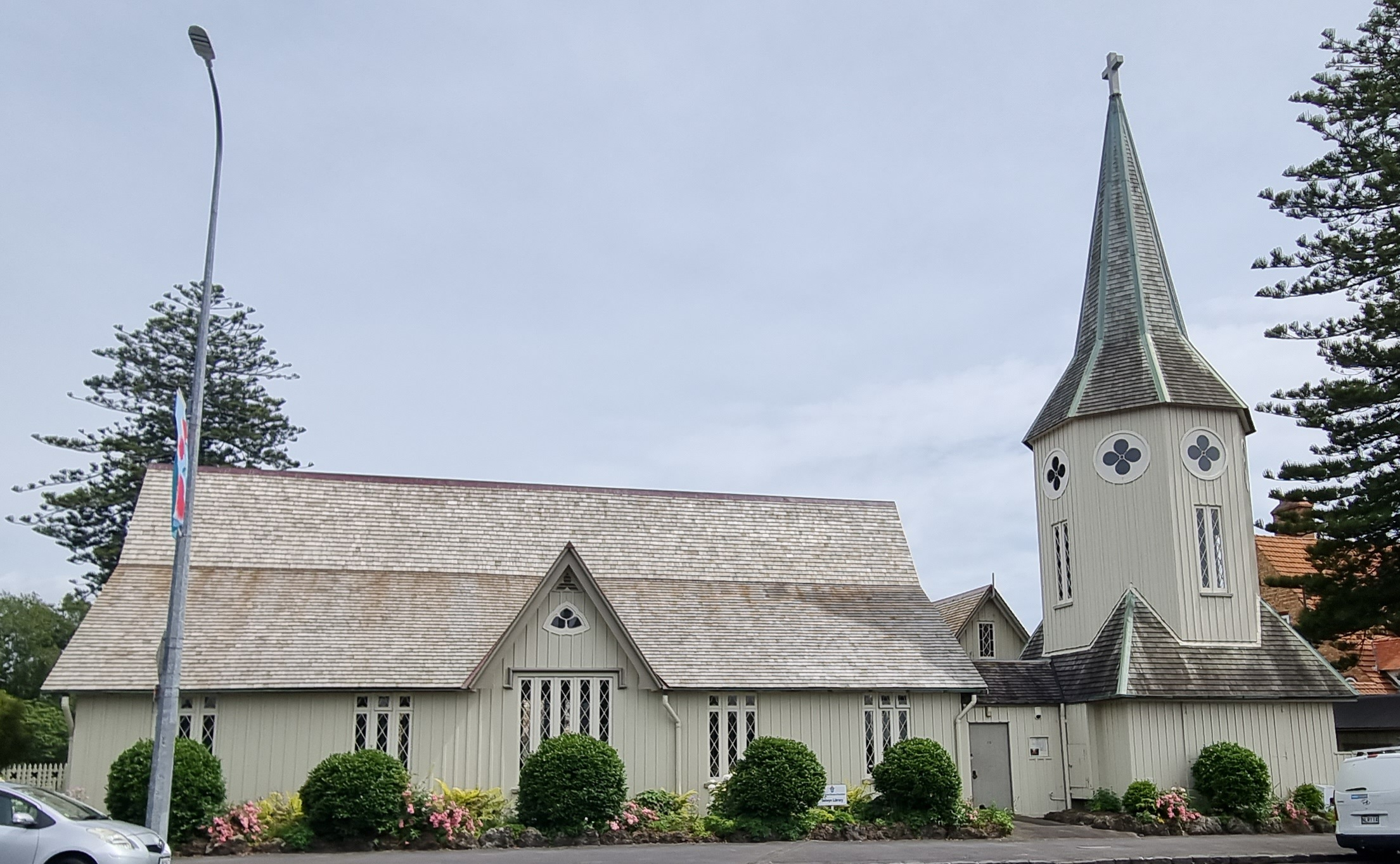
- Selwyn Court
- Interactive map of the Selwyn Court area

General information
- Architectural style: Selwyn Gothic
- Location: 6-8 St Stephens Avenue, Parnell, Auckland, New Zealand
- Coordinates: 36°51′30.91″S 174°47′0.48″E
- Construction started: 1861

Design and construction
- Architect: Frederick Thatcher

Heritage New Zealand – Category 1
- Designated: 6 June 1983
- Reference no.: 23 and 24

Selwyn Court is a category 1 historic place in Auckland which originally consisted of a library, a steepled octagonal tower, the house and chapel, all in a Gothic Revival style known as Selwyn Gothic. The chapel has since been moved to Diocesan School for Girls.

== History ==
In 1861, the complex of Bishopscourt, now known as Selwyn Court, was begun. It was the first official bishop's residence, and home to Bishop George Selwyn, from where it gets its current name.

The architect was Frederick Thatcher, and this complex is considered his last major commission for the Auckland Diocese. The builder was A.H. Hunter, who also built St Mary's Church in Parnell. The library was completed first in 1861, followed by the octagonal tower in 1862, the house and chapel, between 1863 and 1866.

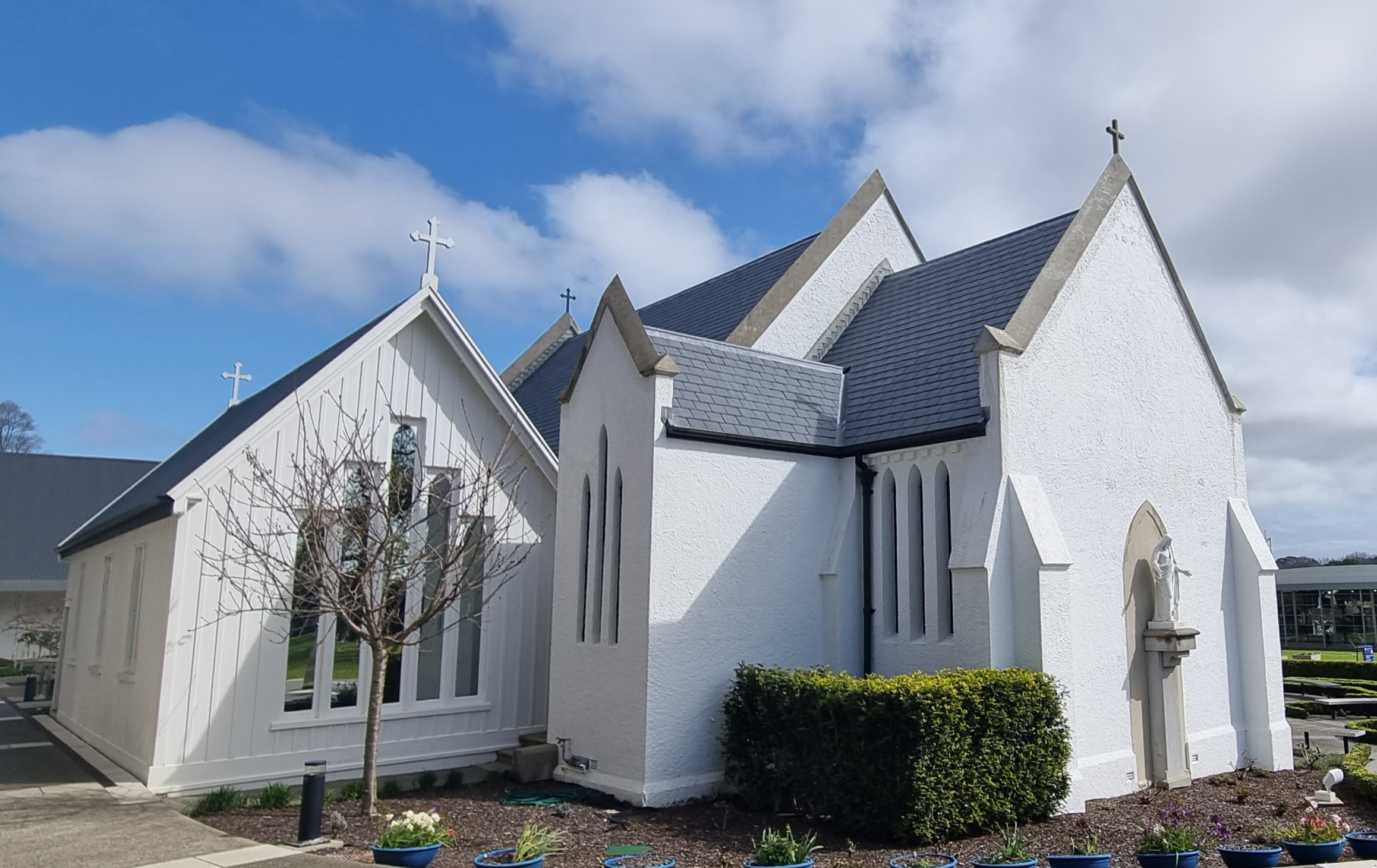
St Barnabas Chapel

In the 1900s, there began to be issues with damp in the timber structures and a new brick house was added to the complex in 1908, known as Neligan House. In 1910, the chapel was moved to Diocesan School for Girls, and is known as St Barnabas' Chapel. It is now a category 2 historic place in Auckland.

Since the 1980s, Selwyn Court has served as the Deanery for the Anglican Church in Auckland.

== Description ==
The complex originally included a library, a steepled octagonal tower, the house and chapel. The buildings were organised around a U-shaped courtyard. The buildings are what is referred to as "Selwyn Gothic" – a variant of Gothic Revival style, in timber rather than in stone.

The architect, Frederick Thatcher, is particularly noted for his use of shingled roof, vertical board and battened walls, and Early English style windows. These are present across the varied buildings of the complex, with the exception of the house which has wider casements for the windows.

The complex was largely constructed to look like single storey buildings; however, the house was built on a slope to incorporate private rooms in a stone walled lower storey, with large reception rooms on the upper floor that were entered from the courtyard.

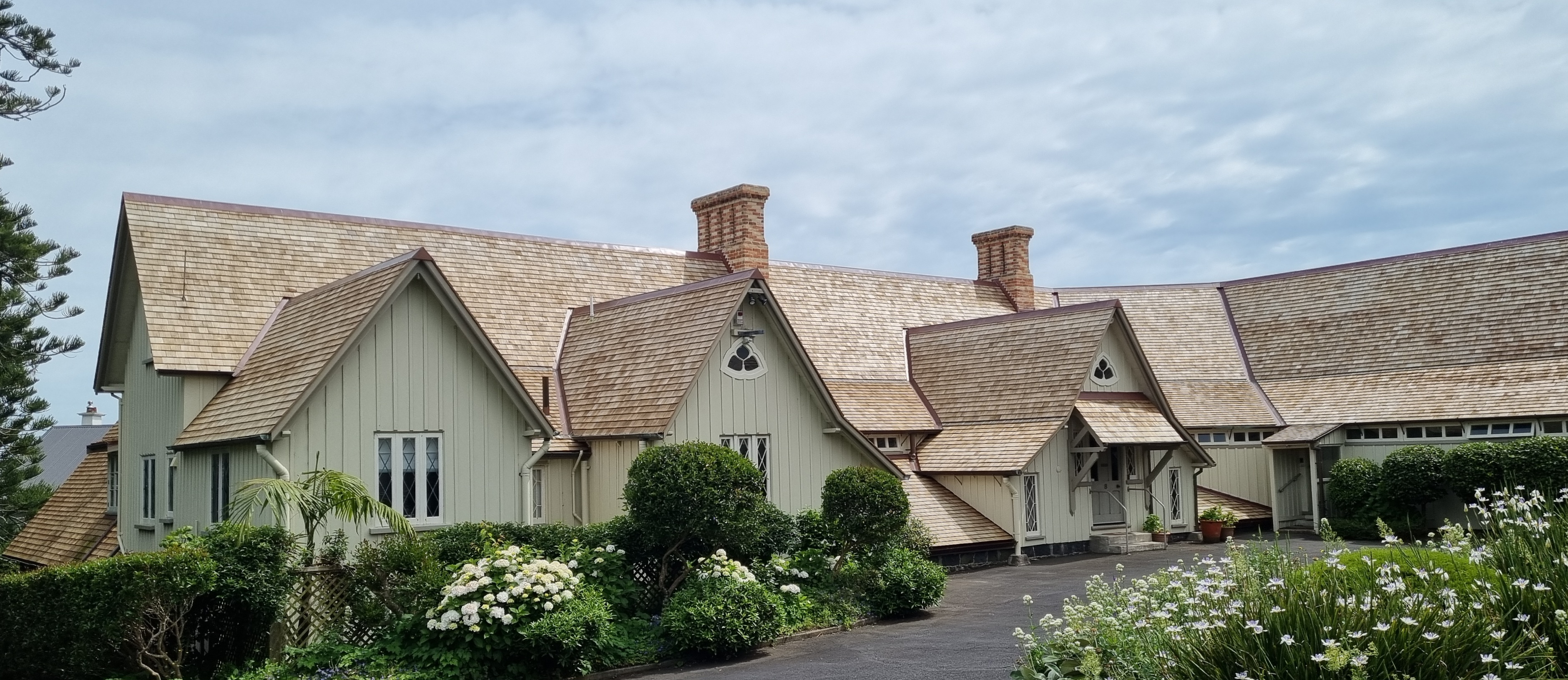
Selwyn Library

The house is linked to the library by offices and a corridor on the northeast, and both buildings have Selwyn's invention of carrying roof supports through to floor level as a form of internal buttressing which gives the exterior with a broken up appearance. The Library is considered to show this feature most clearly.

There have been a number of changes to the complex, particularly notable are the removal of the chapel and the addition of the double storey verandah to the northern sides of the house around 1883.
