= Charles Chaloner Ogle =

English journalist, war correspondent and philhellene (1851–1878)

Charles Chaloner Ogle ARIBA
- Born: 16 April 1851; Loudoun Road, St John's Wood, Marylebone, Middlesex, UKGBI
- Died: 29 March [O.S. 17 March] 1878 (aged 26); Makrinitsa, Thessaly, Ottoman Empire (now Greece)
- Cause of death: Homicide
- Burial place: First Cemetery of Athens
- Other name: Karolos Ogle
- Education: University of London, 1869
- Occupations: Journalist; war correspondent; Architect
- Movement: Philhellenism
- Awards: Order of the Redeemer, Knight Silver Cross

Charles Chaloner Ogle ARIBA (1851–1878) was an English journalist, war correspondent, architect and philhellene, who was killed in uncertain circumstances while reporting on the Thessaly Revolt of 1878. Ogle was the first recorded death of a journalist and war correspondent in present-day Greece.

== Early life and education ==
Charles Chaloner Ogle was born on 16 April 1851 in Loudoun Road, Marylebone to John Ogle (1813–1903), a schoolmaster, and Sarah Dorothy Ogle (née Pinn; 1821–1884). Ogle was the seventh of eleven siblings.

Ogle's father ran a school called Loudoun House in St John's Wood, which later moved to St Clere around 1860. Ogle attended his father's school before studying architecture at University of London, graduating in June 1869. Following graduation Ogle studied architecture In London under Frederick William Roper (1840–1910).

In 1872, Ogle obtained a certificate for excellence in architectural construction and was admitted as an associate of the Royal Institute of British Architects (RIBA).

== Career ==
In August 1875, Ogle relocated to Athens and worked in the office of Ernst Ziller. During this period Ogle began contributing to The Builder, and reported on the rebuilding of Athens. In 1876, Ogle became a war correspondent for The Times.

During the Great Eastern Crisis, Ogle reported on the Montenegrin–Ottoman War, the Herzegovina uprising and the Cretan revolt.

Before his death Ogle has been awarded the Knight Silver Cross of the Order of the Redeemer by the Greek government.

== Death ==
In January 1878, Ogle travelled to Pelion to report on the Thessalian Revolt. During this period Ogle sent almost daily reports to The Times. Ogle's reports emphasised the plight of Thessaly's civilian population.

On the 15 March 1878, Ogle sent his final letter to his mother from Volos. On 21 March [O.S. 9 March] 1878, Ogle travelled from Volos to Makrinitsa. Ogle was reportedly carrying only a walking stick, having left his revolver behind.

Ogle is believed to have died on 29 March [O.S. 17 March] 1878, following the Battle of Makrinitsa. Ottoman officials sent Hobart Pasha Ogle's passport alongside a report that claimed Ogle's deceased body had been found at a house in Makrinitsa holding a rifle.

Ogle's headless body was later found in a ravine, and was identified by a scar on the wrist and a blood-stained telegram in his pocket-book addressed to The Times. Ogle's head was not found. Ogles body was taken on board H.M.S. Merlin, and transported to Piraeus. Ogle's post-mortem stated he had died following two deep wounds in the stomach, which had perforated his liver and had been inflicted by either a sharp implement or a firearm at close range, and that he had been crudelly decapitated after death. It was also concluded that Ogle had been hit in the leg, most likely with the butt-end of a gun, before his death.

Ogle was theorised to have been assassinated on the orders of the Ottoman commander Amouss Aga, whom Ogle had previously condemned for the massacre of Bulgareni. Pasha alleged that Ogle aided Greek revolutionaries, and had died during an insurgency.

=== Burial ===
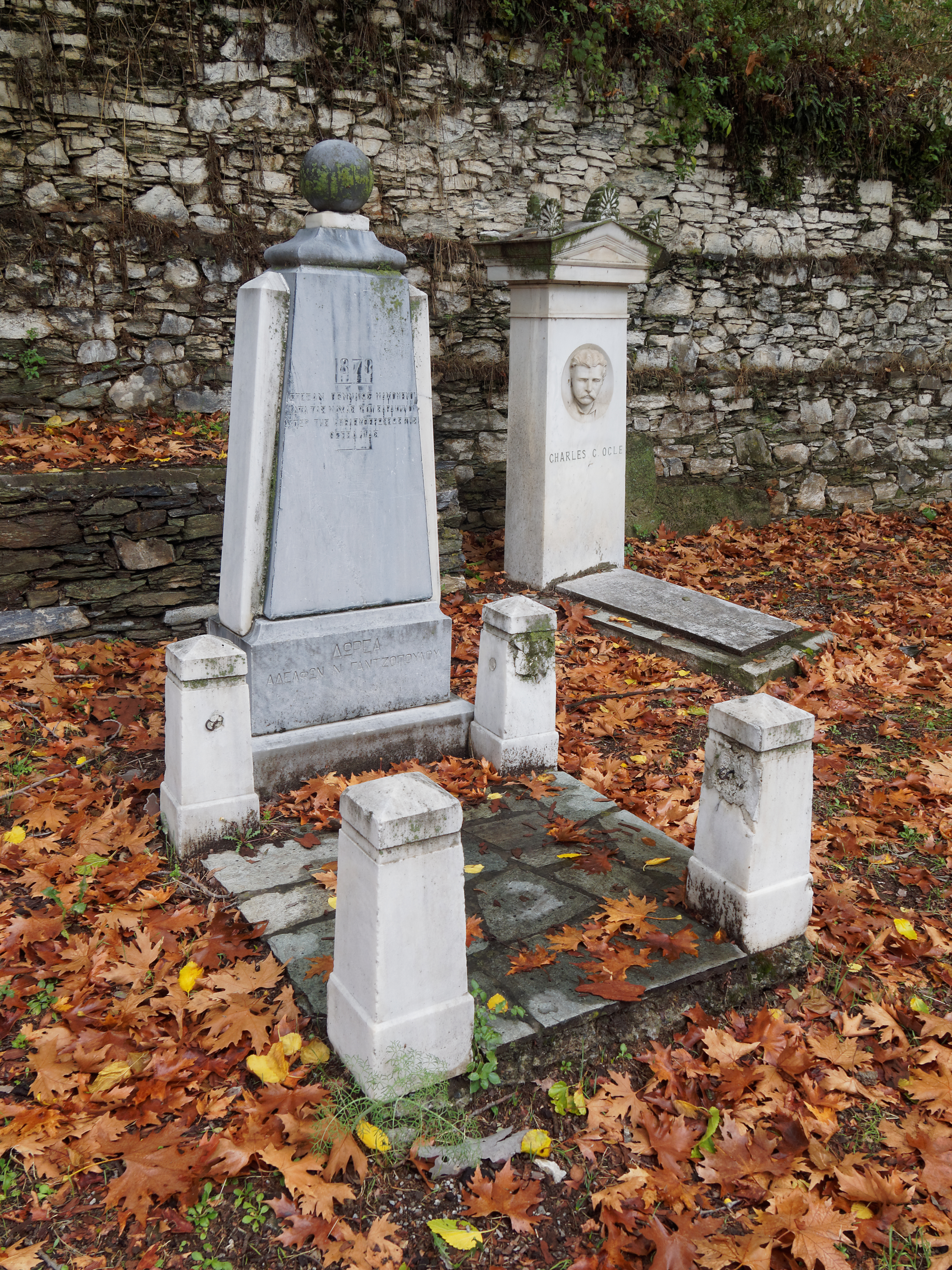
Monument to the battle of Sarakino (foreground) and a monument with a cenotaph to Charles C. Ogle (background), Makrinitsa

On 10 April [O.S. 29 March] 1878, Ogle's funeral took place at the First Cemetery of Athens and was followed by a pilgrimage to the Cathedral Basilica of St. Dionysius the Areopagite. Ogle's funeral was arranged by Charilaos Trikoupis.

Ogle was buried next to the grave of Konstantinos Kanaris. In the 1980s Ogle's grave plot was sold and his tombstone was removed. In 1984, Ogle's tombstone was erected as a monument with a cenotaph in Makrinitsa.

=== 1882 enquiry ===
In 1882, an enquiry into Ogle's death was held by Edwin Henry Egerton, the then British Chargé d'affaires at Athens. The enquiry concluded that it was impossible to determine the exact circumstances of Ogle's death.

== Legacy ==
A street in Volos is named after Ogle.

In 1890, the actor Vasilios Andronopoulos (1838-1897) published the play the "Assassination of Charles Ogle in the Battle of Makrinitsa: A National Drama in Two Acts with Deification" (Greek: Δολοφονία Καρόλου Ογλ εν τη μάχη Μακρυνίτσης : Δράμα Εθνικόν εις πράξεις δύο μετ' Αποθεώσεως).
