= Building (magazine) =

British magazine

- Editor: Chloë McCulloch
- Former editors: Sarah Richardson
- Categories: Construction
- Frequency: Monthly
- Circulation: 15,474 (2011)
- Publisher: Assemble Media Group
- Founder: Joseph Hansom
- Founded: 1843
- Country: United Kingdom
- Language: English
- Website: www.building.co.uk
- ISSN: 0007-3318

Building is one of the United Kingdom's oldest business-to-business magazines, launched as The Builder in 1843 by Joseph Aloysius Hansom – architect of Birmingham Town Hall and designer of the Hansom Cab. The journal was renamed Building in 1966 as it is still known today, and is the only UK title to cover the entire building industry.

== History ==
The Builder's first two editors, Hansom and Alfred Bartholomew (1801–1845), did not last long in the job. The architect George Godwin (1813–1888) was editor from 1844 to 1883, and turned The Builder "into the most important and successful professional paper of its kind with a readership well beyond the architectural and building world." Godwin apparently wrote most of the content himself, relying on a staff of just five people. His successor, Henry Heathcote Statham (1839–1924), edited the journal from 1883 to 1908.

Rival publication The British Architect and Northern Engineer, founded as The British Architect in 1874, merged with The Builder in 1919, bringing contributions from architectural illustrator Thomas Raffles Davison (1853–1937).

Other contributors to The Builder over the years have included architects such as Robert Dennis Chantrell, Henry Clutton (1819–1893), Josiah Conder, James Fergusson, William Curtis Green (1875–1960), John Woody Papworth (1820–1870), Howard Morley Robertson (1888–1963) and William White. They have also included the novelist Hall Caine, the engineer and antiquary G. T. Clark, and the short-lived journalist Charles Chaloner Ogle. Other illustrators have included Arthur Beresford Pite and Worthington George Smith (1835–1917).

== Recent history and Building today ==
The magazine was named as the best-edited weekly business magazine by the British Society of Magazine Editors both in 1999 and in 2001. It was the business magazine of the year in 2002. Having acquired the magazine a year earlier from Vivendi Universal, in 2003 Aprovia UK sold Building to UBM plc as part of a £79m deal.

According to ABC (Audit Bureau of Circulations), the magazine's circulation for the year ending in June 2006, was 25,017, but circulation dropped during the recession of the late 2000s to 21,271 for the year July 2009 – June 2010 (the last year the title was ABC-certified), with the decline continuing in 2011 (the 11 November issue had a print circulation of 15,474).

Building's website features industry news, jobs and an archive of over 80,000 articles. In 2006 Building4jobs.co.uk was launched focusing on industry jobs and careers.

In January 2018, UBM sold Building (plus Building Design, a venue directory and various events) to a management team, Assemble Media Group, led by former editor Tom Broughton.
