= Alfred Bartholomew =

English architect, editor and author (1801–1845)

- Born: 28 March 1801
- Died: 2 January 1845 (aged 43)
- Occupation: Architect

Alfred Bartholomew (28 March 1801 – 2 January 1845), was an English architect, editor and author. He was editor of The Builder, and author of several works upon practical architectural questions.

== Writings ==
His writing include Specifications for Practical Architecture, which is a compilation of forms of documents deemed to be necessary for the execution of detail work in buildings; a paper entitled "Hints relative to the Construction of Fireproof Dwellings" (London 1839); both of which were well received, though now of little professional value; and a synopsis of the Metropolitan Buildings Act 1844, first published in The Builder, and revised and corrected for separate publication, under the title of Cyclopædia of the New Metropolitan Building Act, by the author only a few weeks before his death. During his editorship of The Builder in 1844, Bartholomew also contributed many articles upon various professional subjects to its columns, and under his editorship the circulation of the journal increased.

== Life ==
Originally destined for commercial life, young Bartholomew received only the moderate education of a middle-class school. But having manifested a decided aptitude for mathematics, his parents articled him to J. H. Good, architect, of Hatton Garden, a pupil of John Soane. Bartholomew devoted himself enthusiastically to this profession. He studied the classic style in the greatest of Soane's works, the Bank of England, the details of which he used to spend much of his time in measuring. But his master's employment in ecclesiastical work soon diverted him to the more congenial study of Gothic, especially church Gothic, architecture, his enthusiasm for which led to the foundation of a society, of which he was one of the earliest and most ardent members, of "Freemasons of the Church, for the recovery, maintenance, and furtherance of the true principles and practice of architecture". To the same period of mental development may also be assigned his publication, in 1831, of Sacred Lyrics, being an attempt to render the Psalms of David more applicable to parochial psalmody. Although certainly superior, in freedom and grace of expression at least, to previous versions of the Psalms used in England, and praised as such by various of the bishops in private letters to the author, this attempt did not prove successful, and has now been long ago forgotten. Afterwards the poet devoted himself more exclusively to architecture, and, in the course of the few years that remained to him of life, produced the various works we have named, and earned for himself the respect and esteem of his professional brethren. A few weeks before his death he canvassed successfully for the post of district surveyor of Hornsey. His exertions brought on an attack of rheumatic gout and fever, upon which bronchitis fatally supervened, and he died in his house in Gray's Inn, London, at the age of forty-four.
