= Taranaki wars =

The Taranaki Wars were a series of conflicts in New Zealand's Taranaki Province in the 1860s which form a major part of the New Zealand Wars:

- The First Taranaki War (1860–1861), also known as the North Taranaki War
- The Second Taranaki War (1864–1866)
- Tītokowaru's War (1868–1869), which also took place in Taranaki

== See also ==
- New Zealand Wars
