= New Zealand Wars Memorial, New Plymouth =

New Zealand Wars Memorial on Marsland Hill, New Plymouth

New Zealand Wars Memorial New Plymouth
- New Zealand
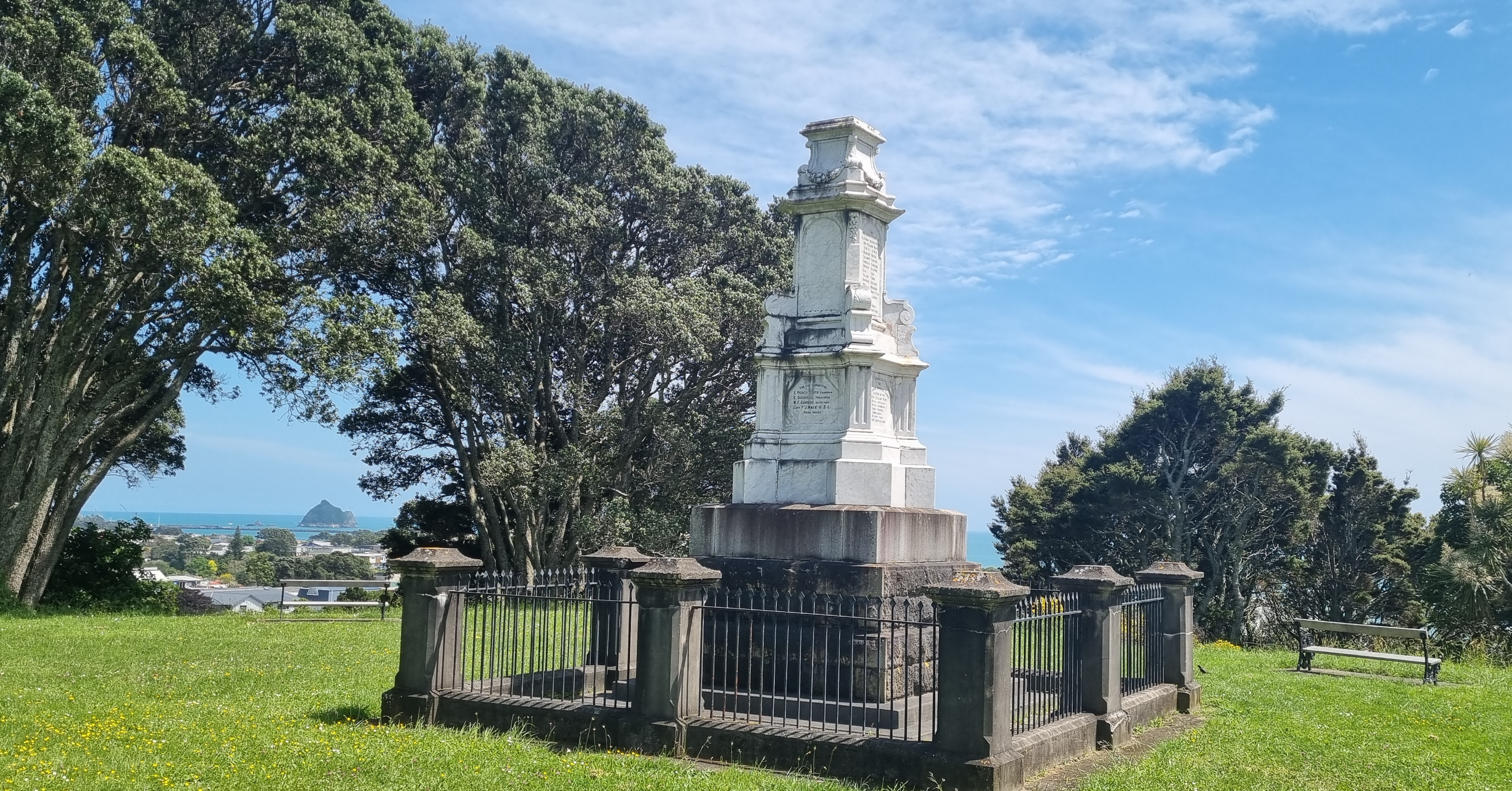
- Marsland Hill New Zealand Wars memorial
- For the men who died during the New Zealand Wars
- Established: 1909
- Unveiled: 7 May 1909
- Location: 39°3′40.892″S 174°4′25.903″E; Marsland Hill, New Plymouth
- Designed by: Frank Messenger

Heritage New Zealand – Category 1
- Official name: New Zealand Wars Memorial
- Designated: 6 June 2013
- Reference no.: 904

The New Zealand Wars Memorial in New Plymouth, New Zealand, is a Category 1 historic place registered by Heritage New Zealand, situated on Marsland Hill. Dedicated to the memory of the men who died during the New Zealand Wars, it was unveiled during a ceremony in May 1909.

== History ==
At the end of the 19th century, with the changing attitudes towards memorialisation, a new trend for erecting memorials had begun in New Zealand, initially being less about honouring the dead, but mainly to emphasise the pride of the people about the contribution to the empire and also as moral examples to the younger generation.

The initiative to build a memorial in New Plymouth, dedicated to the men who died during the New Zealand Wars started in 1905 at the annual meeting of the local Veterans’ Association. The newly formed "Marsland Hill Memorial Committee" began asking for subscriptions in local newspapers. After receiving private subscriptions and a £300 government contribution, in 1907 the committee asked for designs for the monument "to be contributed gratuitously". The winner was the local architect Frank Messenger.

Marsland Hill was chosen as the location for the memorial, on the site of the former military barracks. The hill was the place the British troops were stationed in a stockade, in 1855, during the New Zealand Wars. When the frequency of the battles decreased and the military presence in New Plymouth reduced, the Marsland Hill barracks were removed in 1891.

Frank Messenger, (Note: Frank Messenger (1865 – 1945), son of Colonel William Messenger, was an architect who lived and worked in New Plymouth, New Zealand. After a decade in Melbourne, Australia, he returned to New Plymouth where he set up his own practice. He designed or helped design 315 buildings and monuments in New Plymouth and the surrounding area, like the Cenotaph, Devonport Flats, the St Aubyn Chambers, alterations to St Mary's Church, the Primitive Methodist Church, the White Hart Hotel, the New Plymouth Post Office and the Bank of New Zealand.(Frank Messenger: A Legacy in Design)) the designer of the monument, used his brother George as a model for the soldier on top of the memorial. In 1908, the photographs with him dressed in a military uniform were sent to Italy, to the Carrara marble quarries for sculpting. It was an Auckland mason, Mr Parkinson who started in February, the following year, to build the base of the monument and to erect the statue.

The memorial was unveiled on 7 May 1909 by the governor of New Zealand, Lord Plunket, during a ceremony on Marsland Hill. Soon after, the Memorial Committee decided to put up a temporary barbed-wire fence around the memorial in order to protect it. Later, this was replaced by the wrought-iron railing and concrete piers that surround the monument in the present. On Waitangi Day 1991, the statue on top of the Marsland Hill memorial was smashed by protesters. It was not replaced and the base remained empty.

== Description ==
The carved marble memorial, designed by the local architect Frank Messenger, consisted of a statue of a soldier in Armed Constabulary uniform on top of a pedestal, surrounded by wrought-iron railing and concrete piers. After the statue on top was destroyed, only the plinth remained. It is sculpted in marble and stone with classical ornaments.

On each side of the memorial there are several inscriptions:

- On the North face of the monument: To the honoured memory of the officers and men of HM naval, military and Colonial forces and loyal Maoris who fell in action or died during the Maori wars, 1845–47, 1860–70. Erected by their comrades and fellow countrymen from all parts of the British Empire, April 1909. Also a list with the colonial forces that served in the New Zealand Wars.
- On the West face: Unveiled by / His Excellency the Governor / The Rgt Hon Baron Plunket / KCMG KCVO / May 7, 1909 and a list with the Regiments that served in the war.
- On the East face the list with the vessels of H.M. Navy involved in the conflict and a list with the army corps that served in the war.
- On the South side the list with the members of the Marsland Hill Memorial Committee.

== Image Gallery ==
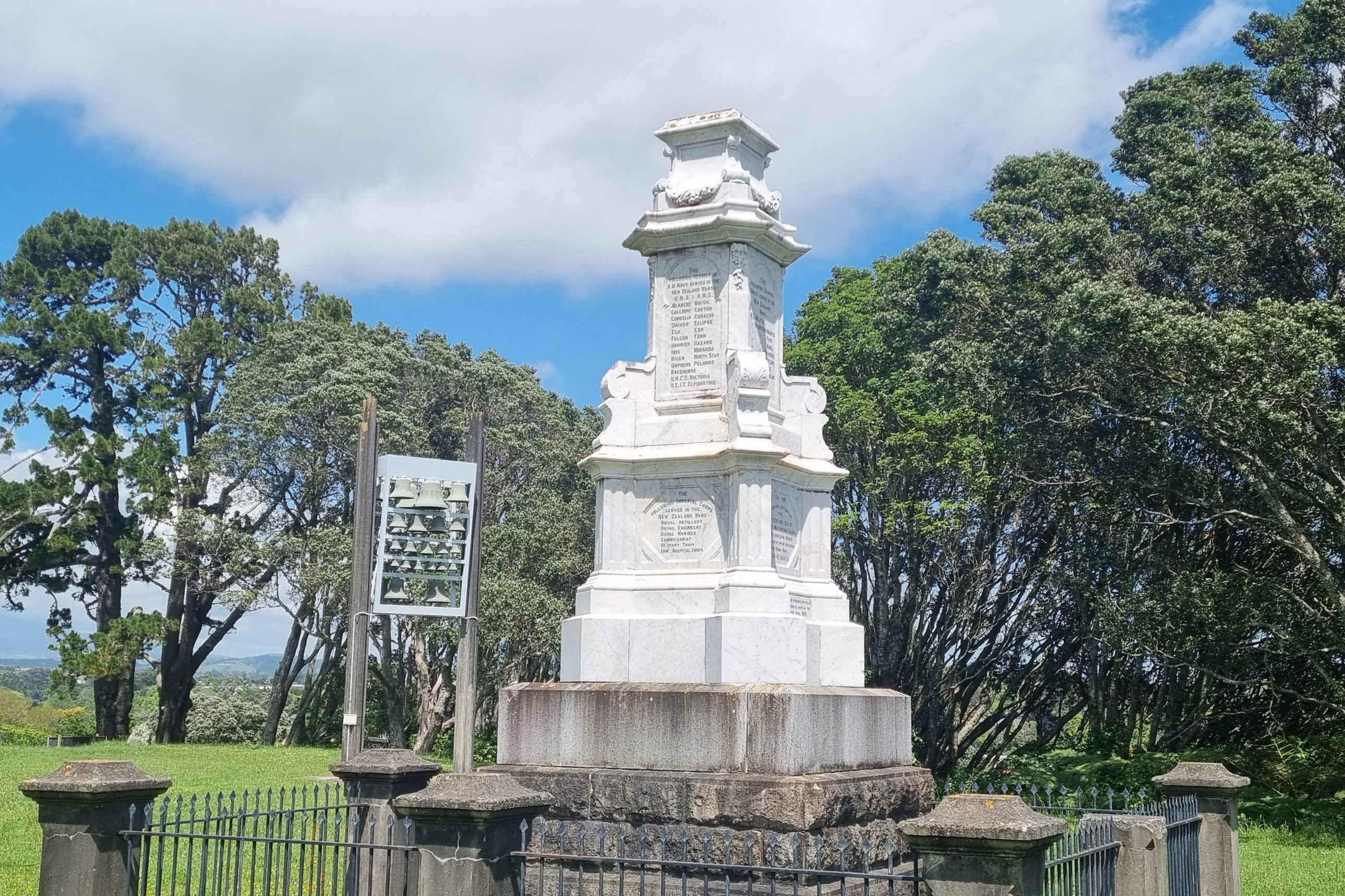
NZ Wars Memorial

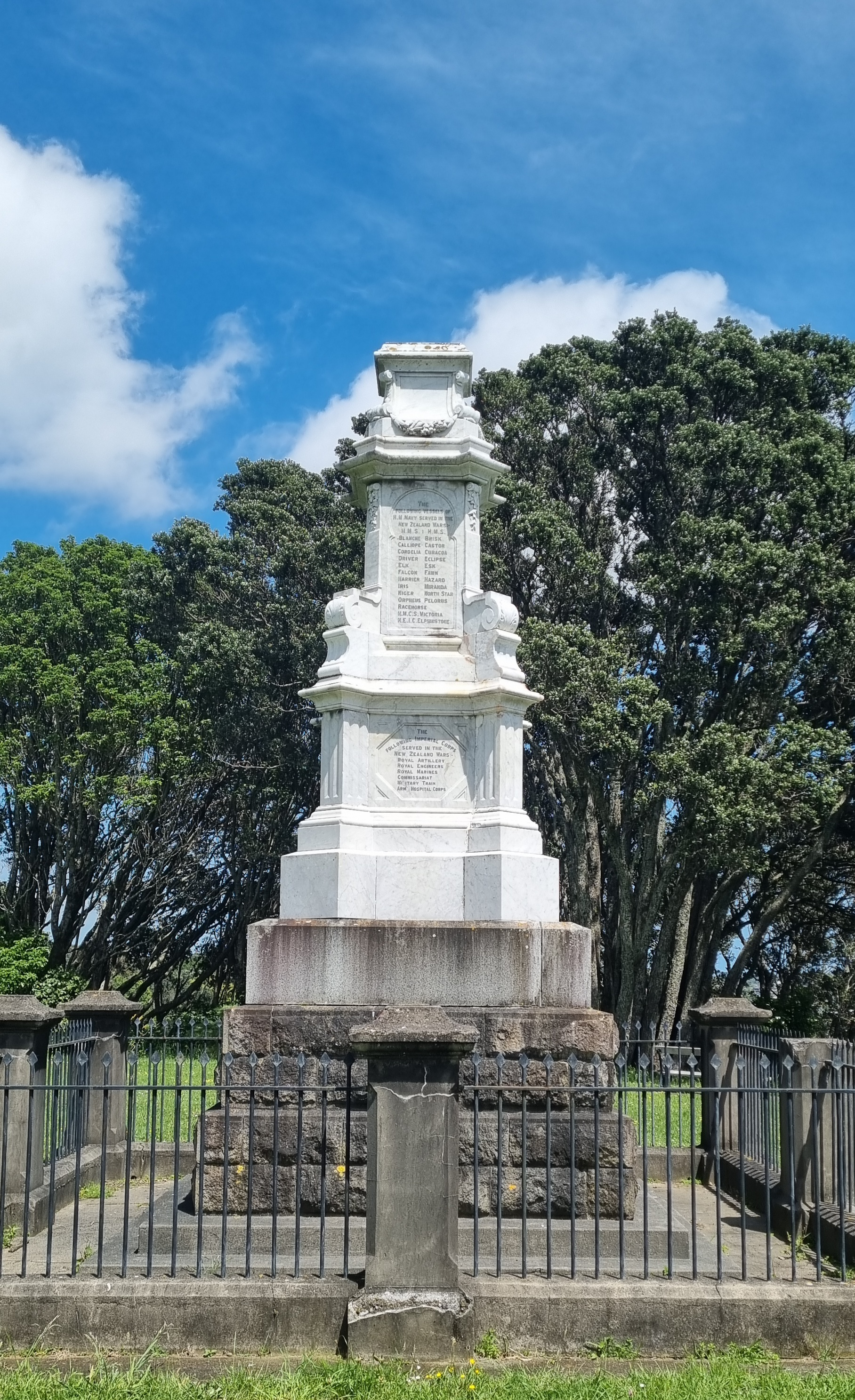
Memorial – East side

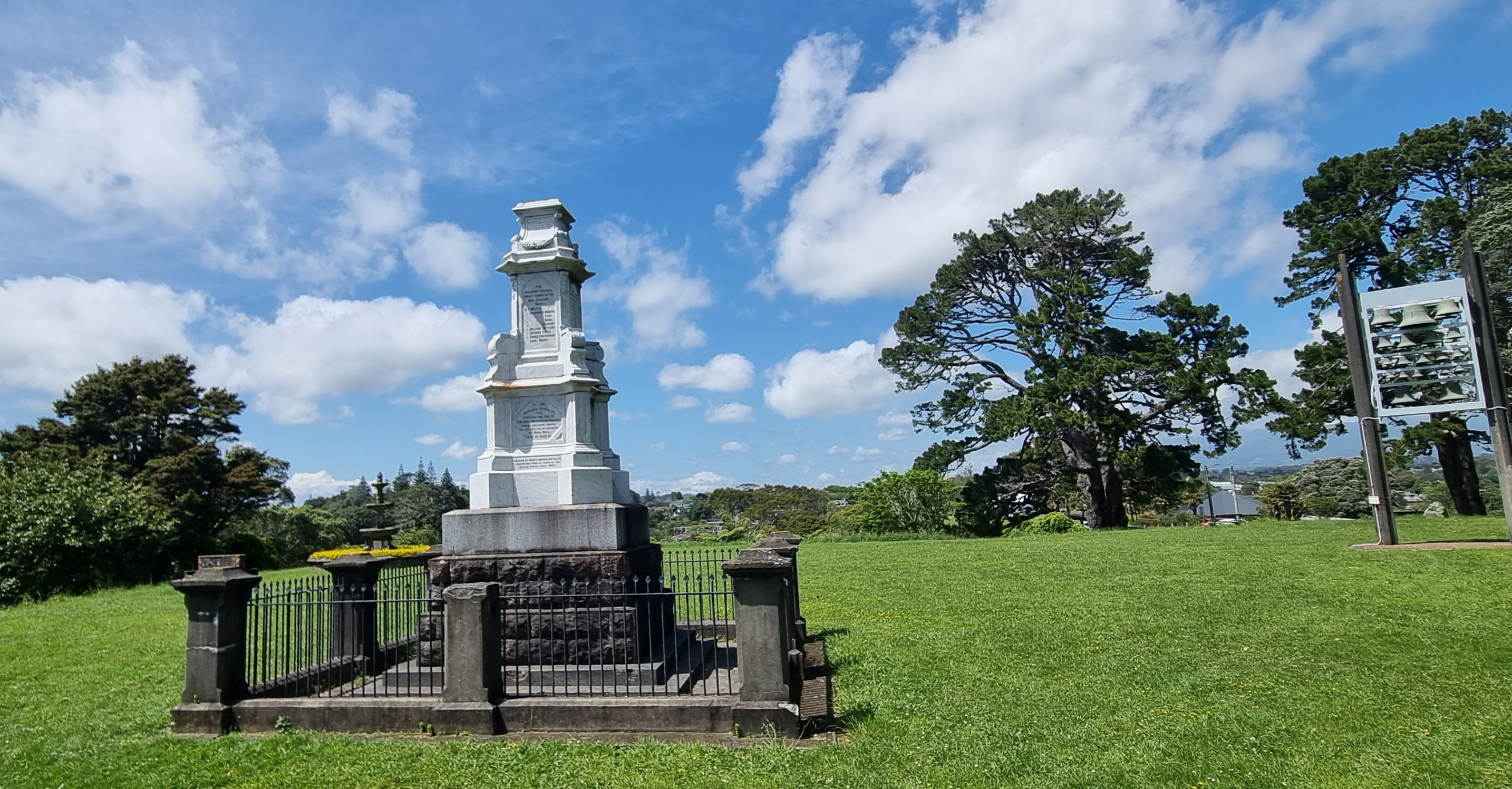
Memorial – North side

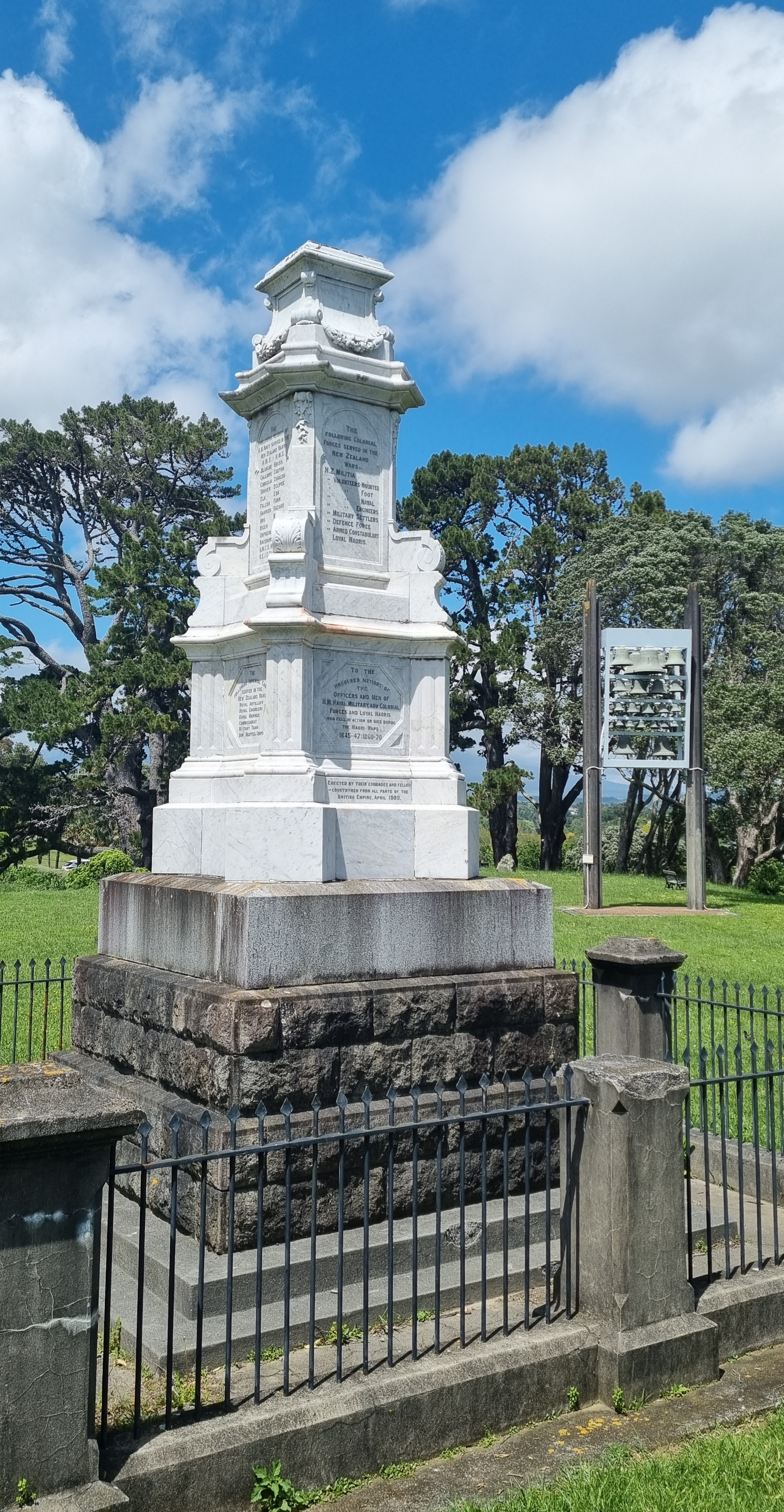
NZ Wars Memorial and a 37 bells Carillon

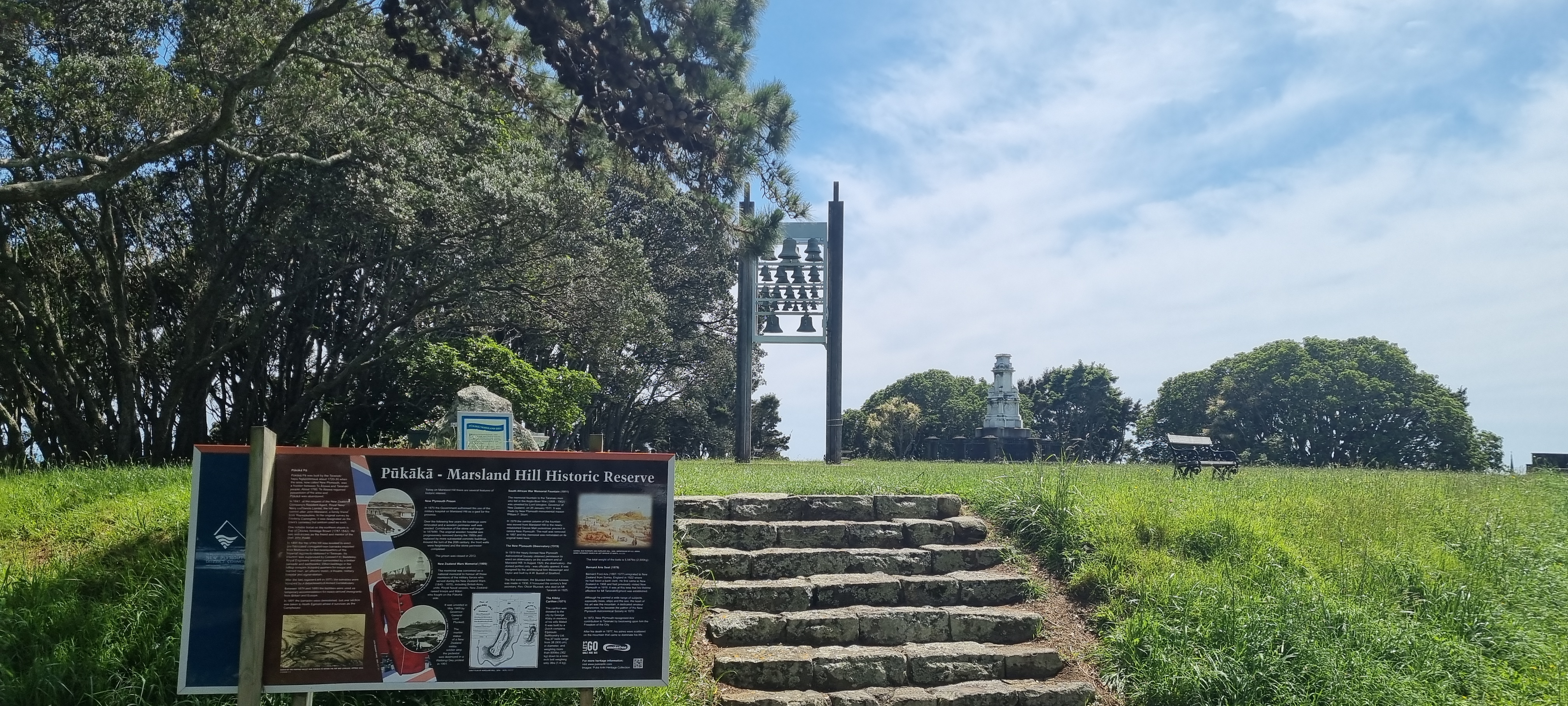
Marsland Hill
