= New Plymouth Savings Bank (Former) =

Heritage building in New Plymouth, New Zealand

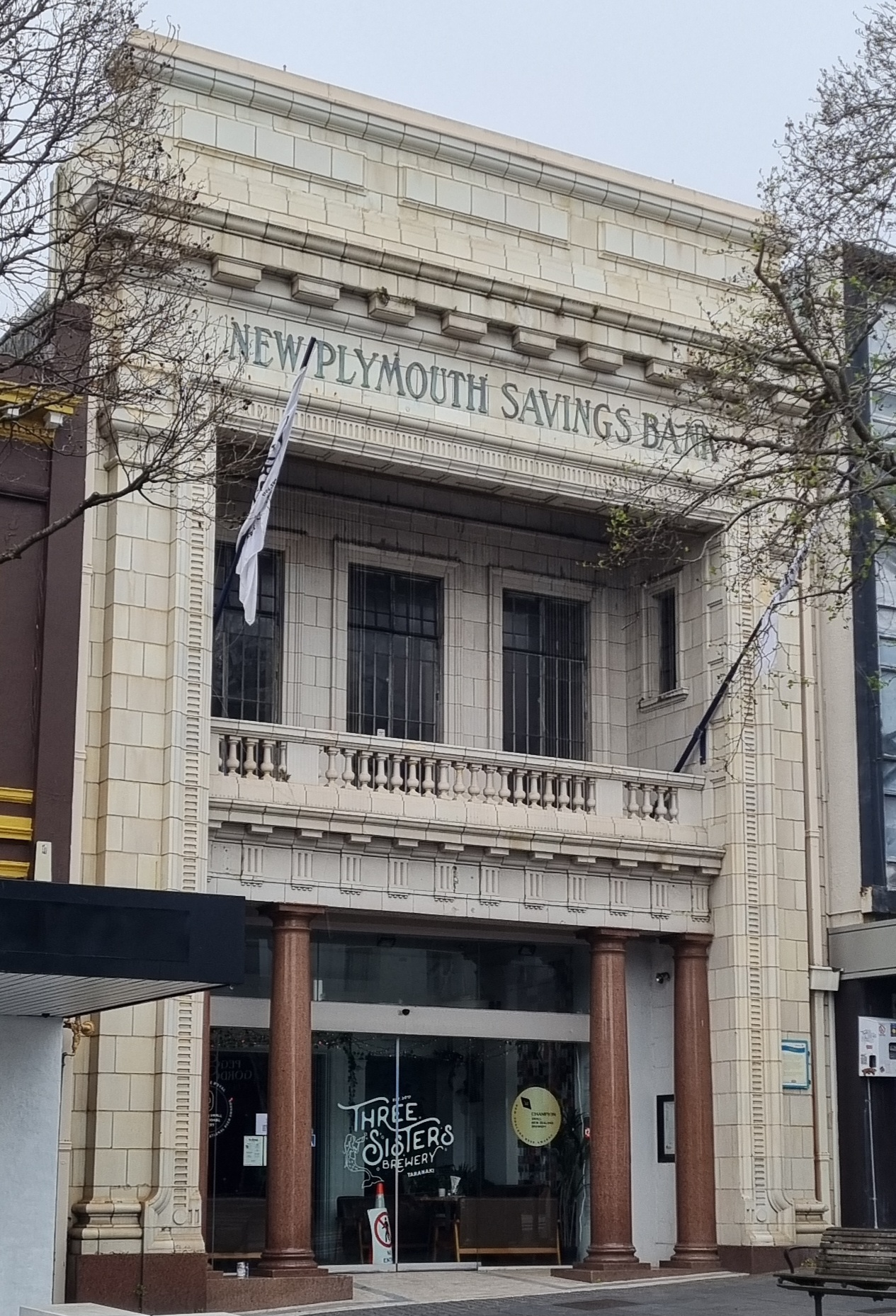
- New Plymouth Savings Bank (Former)
- Interactive map of the New Plymouth Savings Bank (Former) area

General information
- Location: 87-89 Devon Street West, New Plymouth, New Zealand
- Coordinates: 39.0558062°S 174.070191°E
- Construction started: 1929
- Completed: 1930

Design and construction
- Architects: Messenger, Griffiths and Taylor
- Main contractor: Jones & Sandford

Heritage New Zealand – Category 2
- Designated: 1 September 1983
- Reference no.: 913

New Plymouth Savings Bank (Former) building is a Category 2 historic place that served as the headquarters for the institution now known as TSB Bank. Constructed in 1930, the building is considered one of the city's most distinguished architectural landmarks.

== History ==
Founded in 1850, the "New Plymouth Savings Bank" initially struggled financially, but grew after the Taranaki Land Wars period. Designed by the local architecture firm "Messenger, Griffiths and Taylor" in 1929, the new building was completed by Jones and Sandford contractors in 1930, on the old bed of the Mangaotuku Stream, requiring deep foundations.

It was formally opened by Governor‑General Lord Bledisloe on Friday, 13 June 1930. A lot of townspeople filled the street for the occasion, while a group of dignitaries gathered in the entranceway, with the New Zealand flag and the Union Jack displayed prominently on the façade.

The bank was renamed the "Taranaki Savings Bank" in 1964 and became "TSB Bank" in 1989. A high-glazed canopy added during a 1983 refurbishment has since been removed. Other smaller alterations were undertaken in 1958, 1987, and 1989.

In 2013, after being assessed by engineers, the building was found structurally unsafe. The branch closed permanently, with staff relocated to other branches.

After being vacant for several years following its earthquake assessment, the building was revitalised for new purposes. In 2016, it was used as a temporary art gallery by the Govett-Brewster Art Gallery. Since December 2020, it has been home to "Three Sisters Brewery", which operates a brewhouse and taproom within the historic bank chamber.

== Description ==
New Plymouth Savings Bank building is regarded as "perhaps the most distinguished piece of architecture remaining from the notable local firm Messenger, Griffiths and Taylor". Built of reinforced concrete with a stucco finish, the two storey building featured a broad façade framed by massive granite columns, pilasters and a balustraded parapet. The façade is wrapped in glazed terracotta, a feature found nowhere else in New Plymouth.

The interior included ample electric lighting, rubber flooring, and modern ventilation. The public chamber and teller counters were finished with polished materials, combining elegance and practicality, soundproofing and fireproof construction.

New Plymouth Savings Bank (Former) building was registered by Heritage New Zealand as a Category 2 historic place in September 1983.
