= Frank Messenger =

New Zealand architect (1873–1954)

- Born: Francis John Messenger; 4 July 1865
- Died: 11 October 1945 (aged 80); New Plymouth
- Citizenship: New Zealand
- Occupation: architect
- Projects: New Plymouth Cenotaph

Frank Messenger (4 July 1865 – 11 October 1945), full name Francis (Frank) John Messenger, was a New Zealand architect from New Plymouth, known for his significant contributions to the city's architectural landscape. His work spanned over 66 years, during which he designed or helped design around 315 buildings and monuments, some of them now having heritage status.

== Early life ==
Frank Messenger was born on 4 July 1865. He descended from early British settlers who arrived in New Plymouth in 1853. His grandfather, William Messenger, brought his family, including William Bazire, Frank’s future father, to begin a new life in New Zealand. William Bazire later became a significant figure in the 1860s First and Second Taranaki Wars commanding the constabulary and overseeing the Pukearuhe redoubt. The family lived on the rugged west coast, first in a whare (small hut) and later in a proper homestead.

Frank, the second child of William Bazire and Arabella, grew up in an environment steeped in military discipline and frontier life. Athletic and energetic, he excelled in boxing, running, gymnastics, and cycling. He also became a highly capable marksman, rising to the rank of lieutenant in the Taranaki Guards. His brother Arthur would go on to become a well-known New Zealand artist.

Educated in New Plymouth, Frank trained as an architect under Henry J.T. Edmonds. In 1883, he left for Melbourne, where he spent a decade working for the architectural firm Oakden, Addison and Kemp for about ten years. While in Australia, he married his second cousin, Lucie Messenger, on 14 March 1891.

== Life in New Zealand ==
Frank Messenger returned to New Plymouth in 1893 and established his own architectural practice. From 1909, some of his work was in collaboration with Mr William Edward Percival, an architect and Mayor of Inglewood, an affiliation that lasted until ca.1914. He designed many significant buildings in Taranaki, several of which still stand today. His career continued to grow: in 1917, he partnered with Horace Victor Samuel (H.V.S.) Griffiths, and later in 1920, W. Taylor joined the firm, which became "Messenger, Griffiths & Taylor". Following the departure of H. V. S. Griffiths in 1930, Messenger and Taylor established a new practice, Messenger, Taylor & Wolfe, a partnership that remained in operation until the death of Frank Messenger.

Messenger was known for his meticulous attention to detail, a quality still visible in his surviving works. His alterations to St Mary’s Church were so refined that the stone altar he designed in 1915 for the Lady Chapel was instead placed in the main church. He also designed the St Mary’s Peace Hall, built across the road.

Frank Messenger designed several commercial buildings, such as St Aubyn Chambers and the Devonport Flats, and created plans for major civic buildings including New Plymouth Fire Station, Taranaki Jockey Club facilities (Steward’s Stand, Grandstand), New Plymouth Savings Bank, and New Plymouth’s first public library. He designed several churches, like St John’s Anglican Church at Kaimata and St Andrew’s Church at Inglewood and the Sisters of Our Lady of the Missions building in central New Plymouth.

He was responsible for the Inglewood Town Hall, New Plymouth Girls' High School building, the Carrington House and the Boarding House at New Plymouth Boys' High School, the Barret Hospital nurse’s home and the doctor’s residence nearby, as well as the North Egmont Hostel.

Messenger designed the New Plymouth Cenotaph, as a replica of Sir Edwin Lutyens' famous Cenotaph in Whitehall, London. Also, he created the New Zealand Wars Memorial on Marsland Hill, using his brother as the model for the soldier statue on top (destroyed in 1991 during the Treaty of Waitangi protests and never replaced).

In the late 1930s, the firm Messenger, Taylor & Wolf collaborated with the Auckland architectural practice Gummer and Ford on the design of the Wellington Central Library, now known as City Gallery.

Beyond public buildings and monuments, Messenger designed numerous private homes, mostly single or two-storey villas, with weatherboard cladding and steep gabled roofs, typical of the period. They featured decorative gables, often with patterned shingles, stickwork, or ornate fretwork, multi-pane sash windows and ornamental verandahs, including turned posts, brackets, and fretwork that create a highly decorative façade.

In 1903, Messenger built his own two storey residence, "The Pines", at the far end of Gill Street, next to the Te Henui stream, on the site of a former 38-room villa destroyed by fire. Designed in the American Eastern Stick style, the house featured distinctive elements such as fish-scale shingles, hooded windows, and a dog-leg staircase, reflecting both the architectural tastes of the era and the architect’s own style.

Frank Messenger died on 11 October 1945, aged 80.

== Image gallery ==
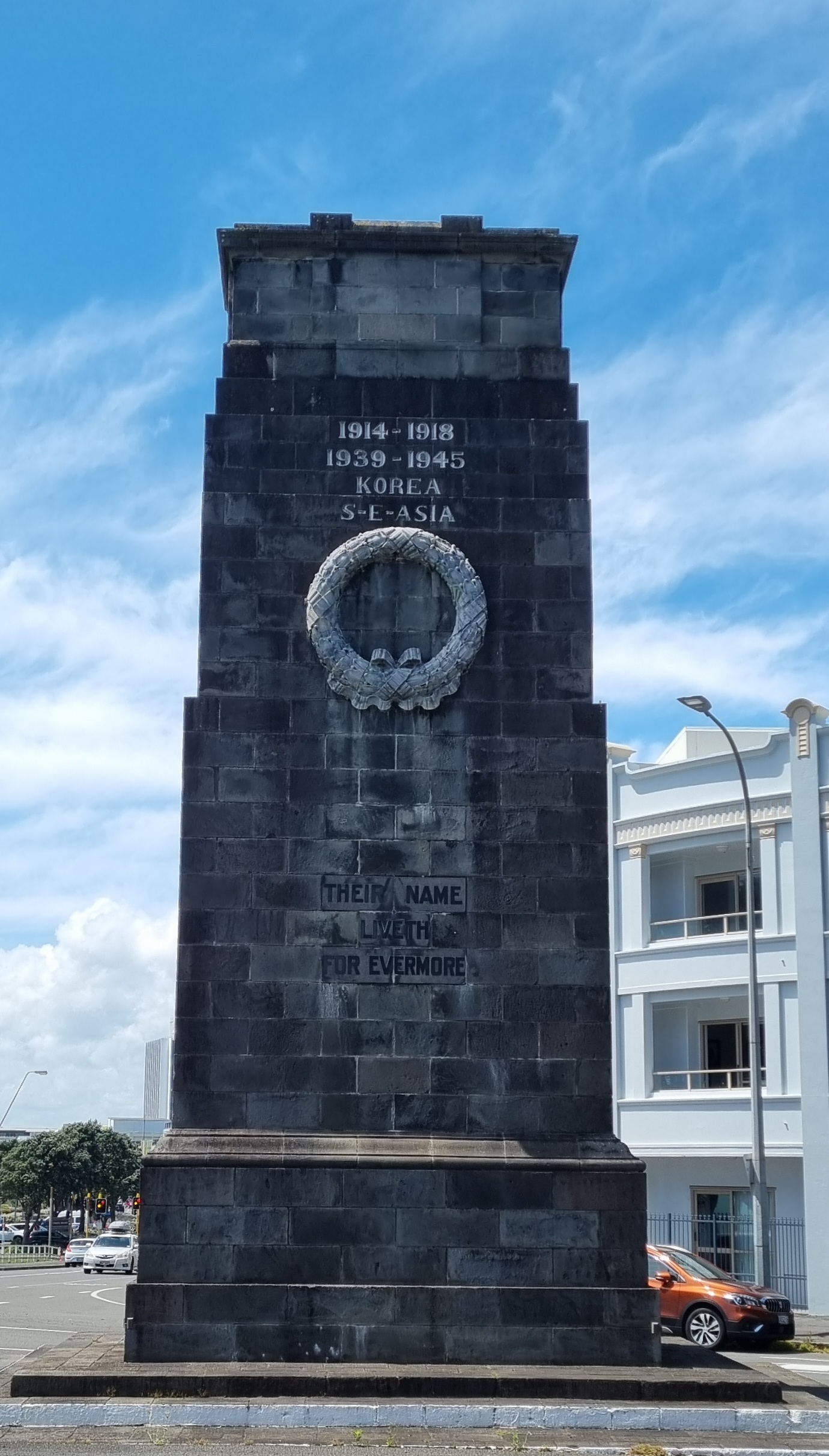
New Plymouth Cenotaph

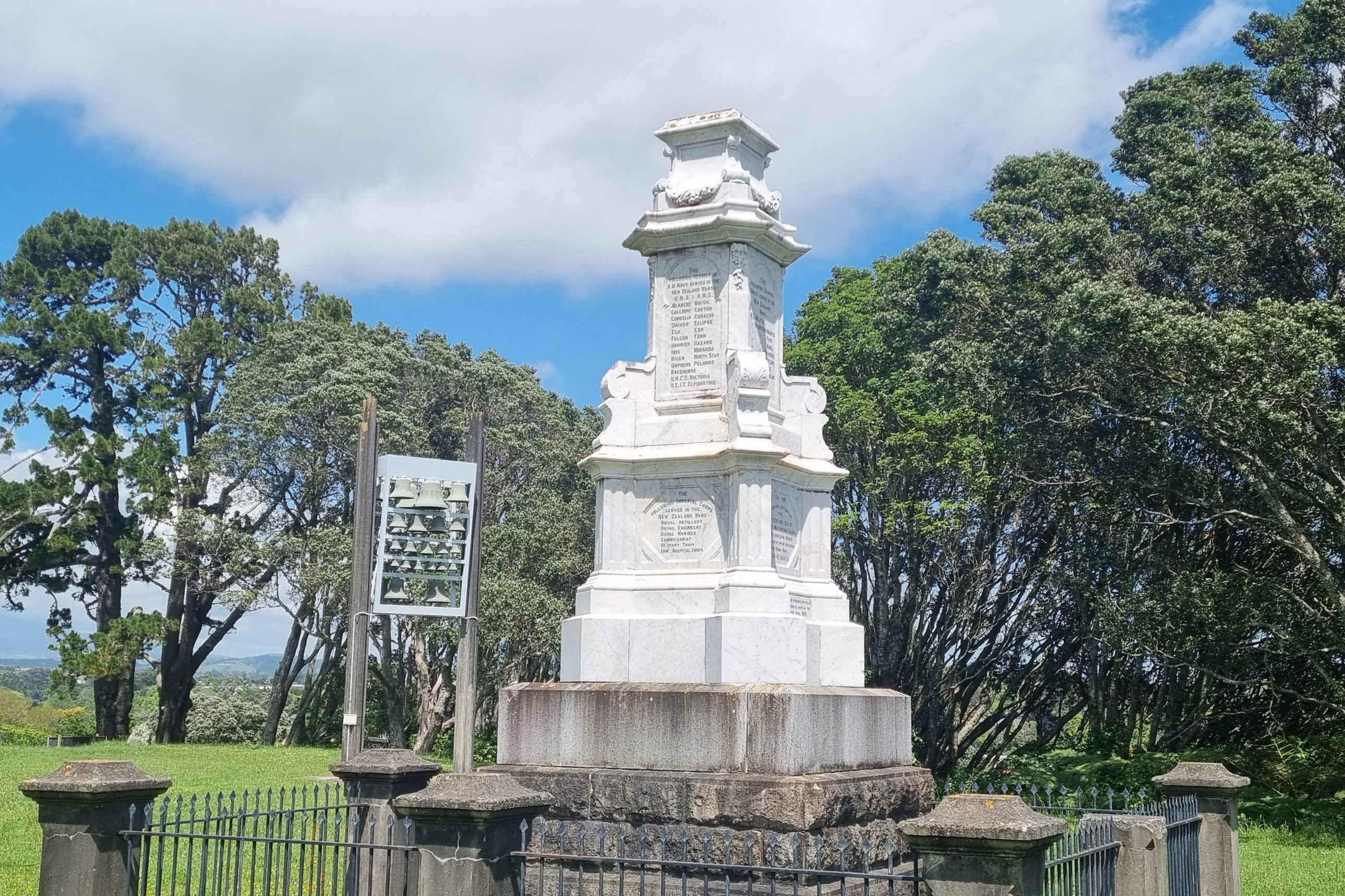
New Zealand Wars Memorial

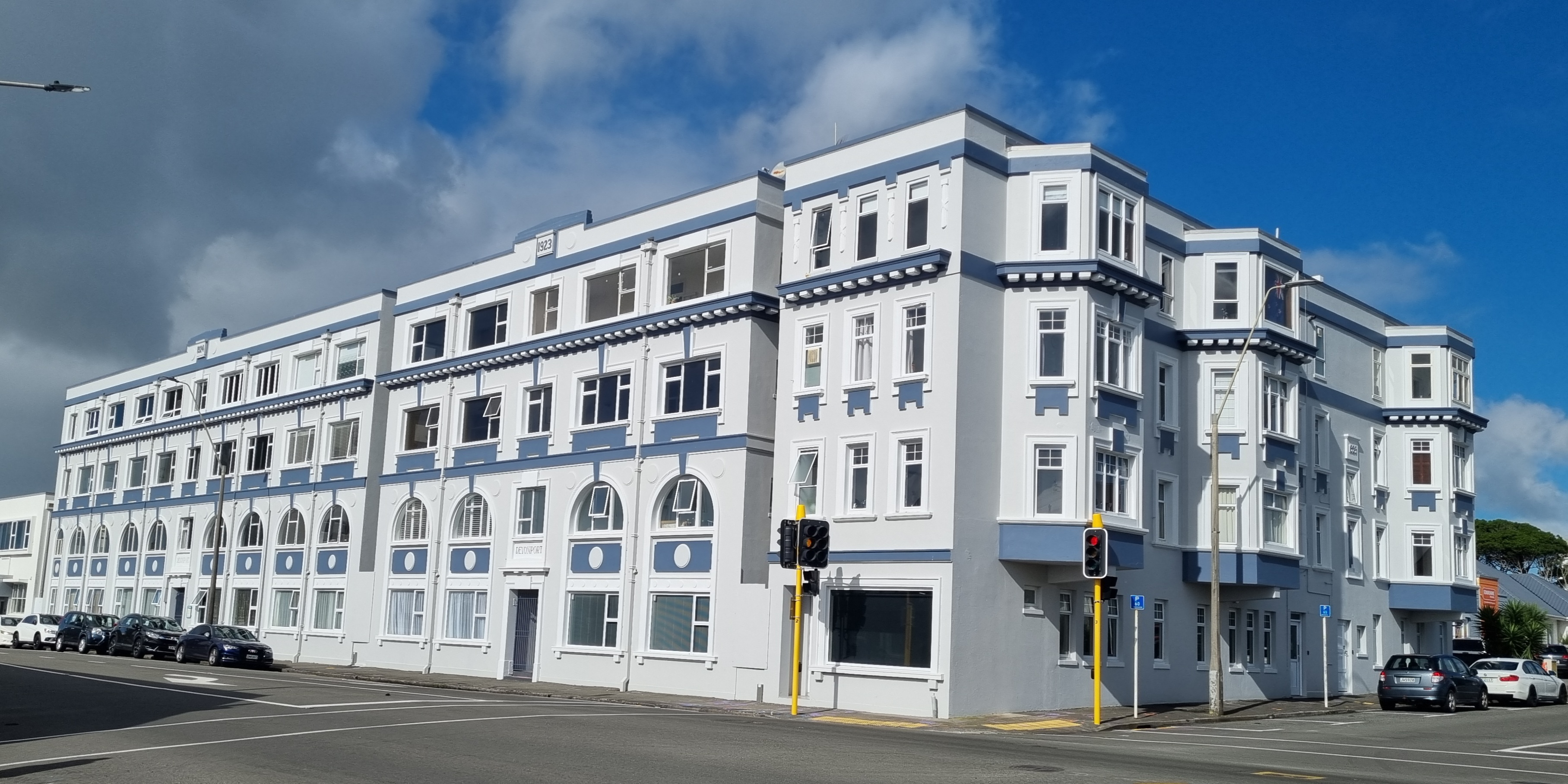
Devonport Flats

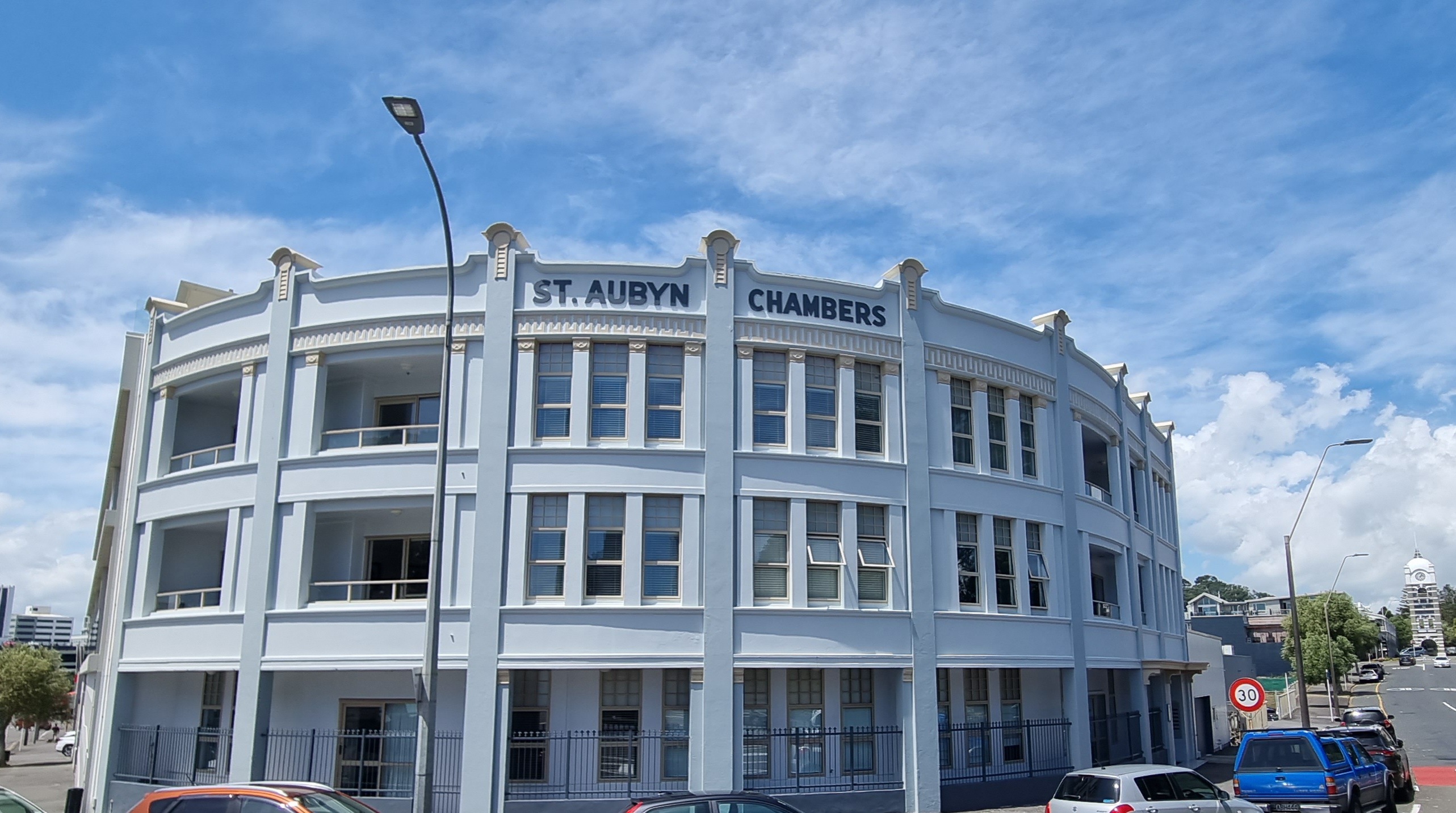
St Aubyn Chambers

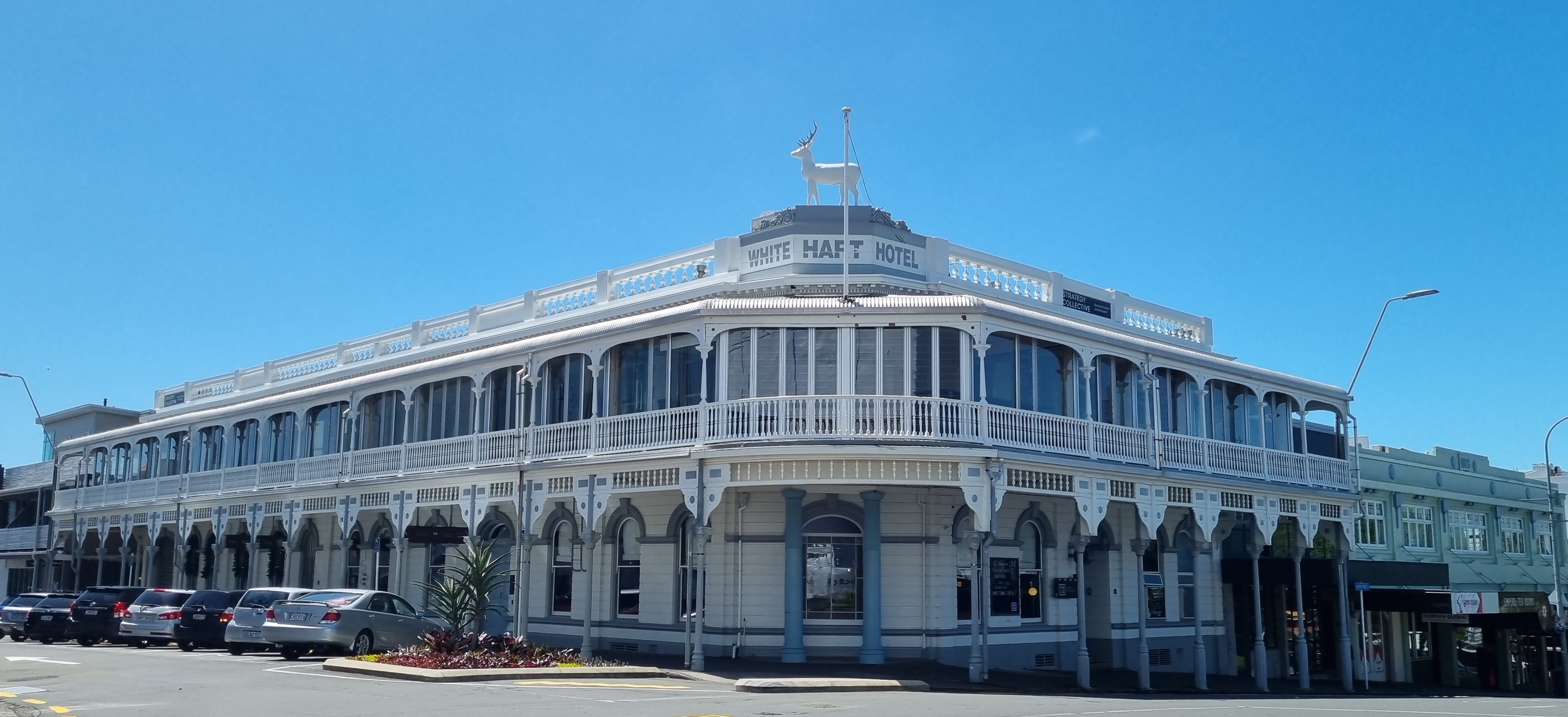
White Hart Hotel

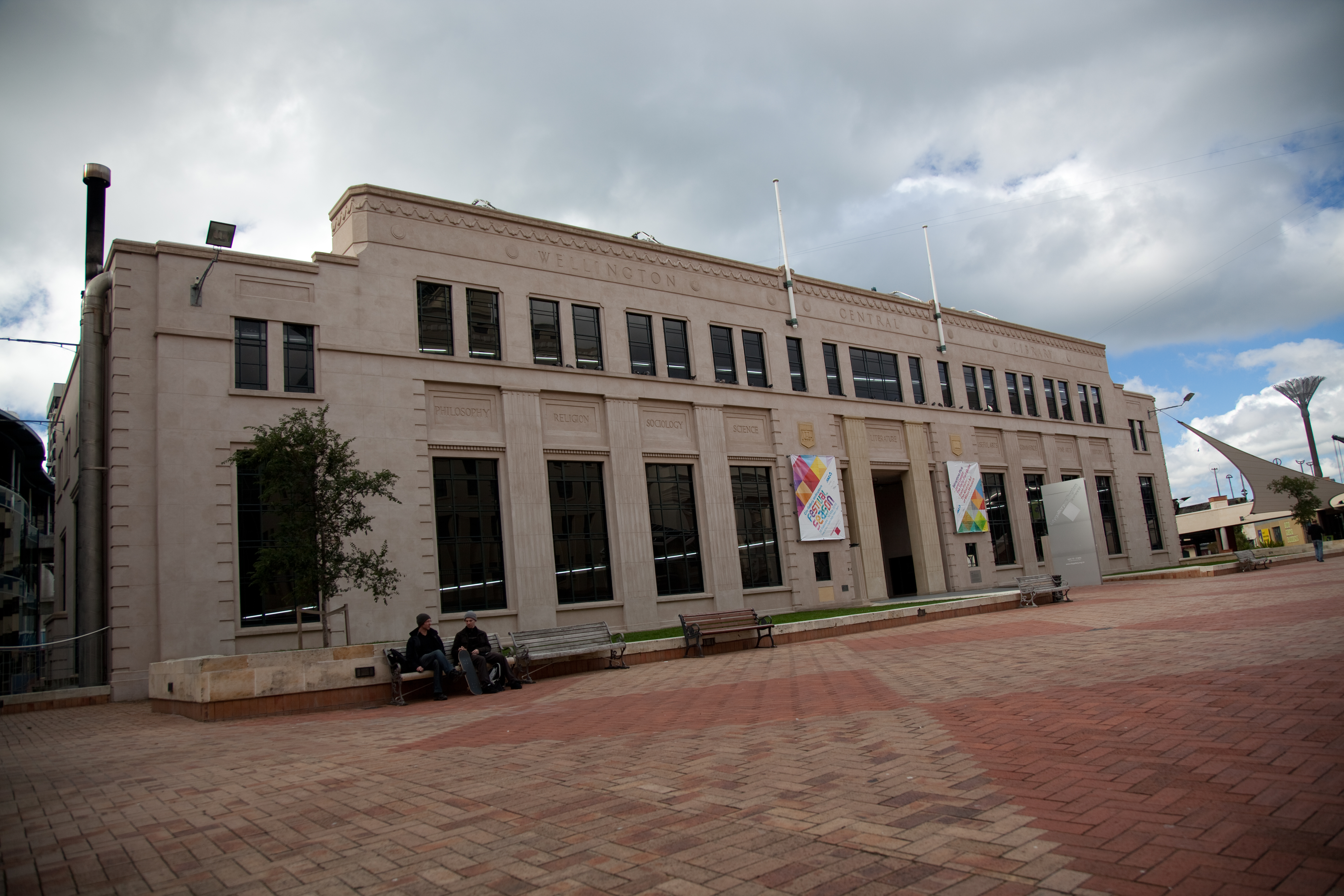
City Gallery Wellington

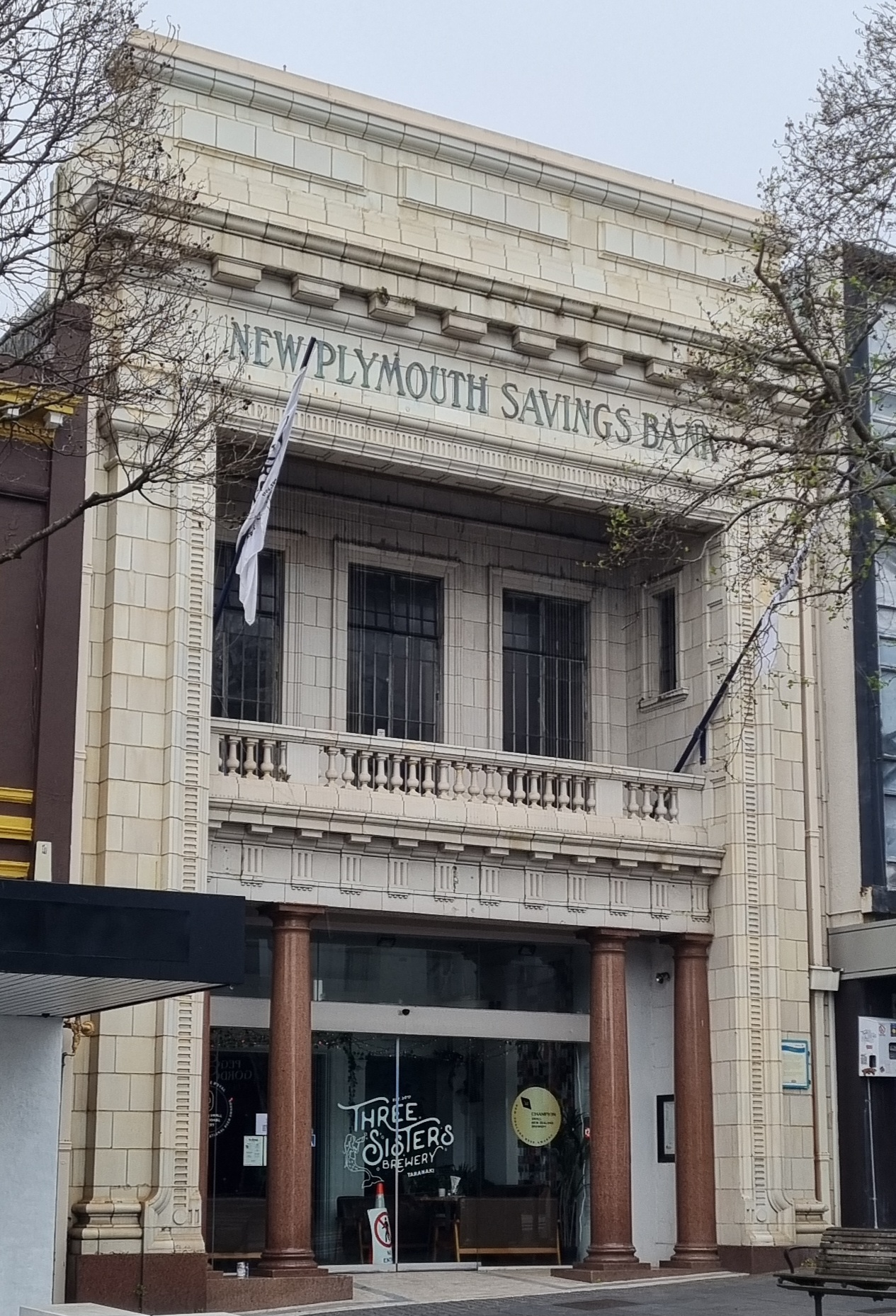
New Plymouth Savings Bank (Former)

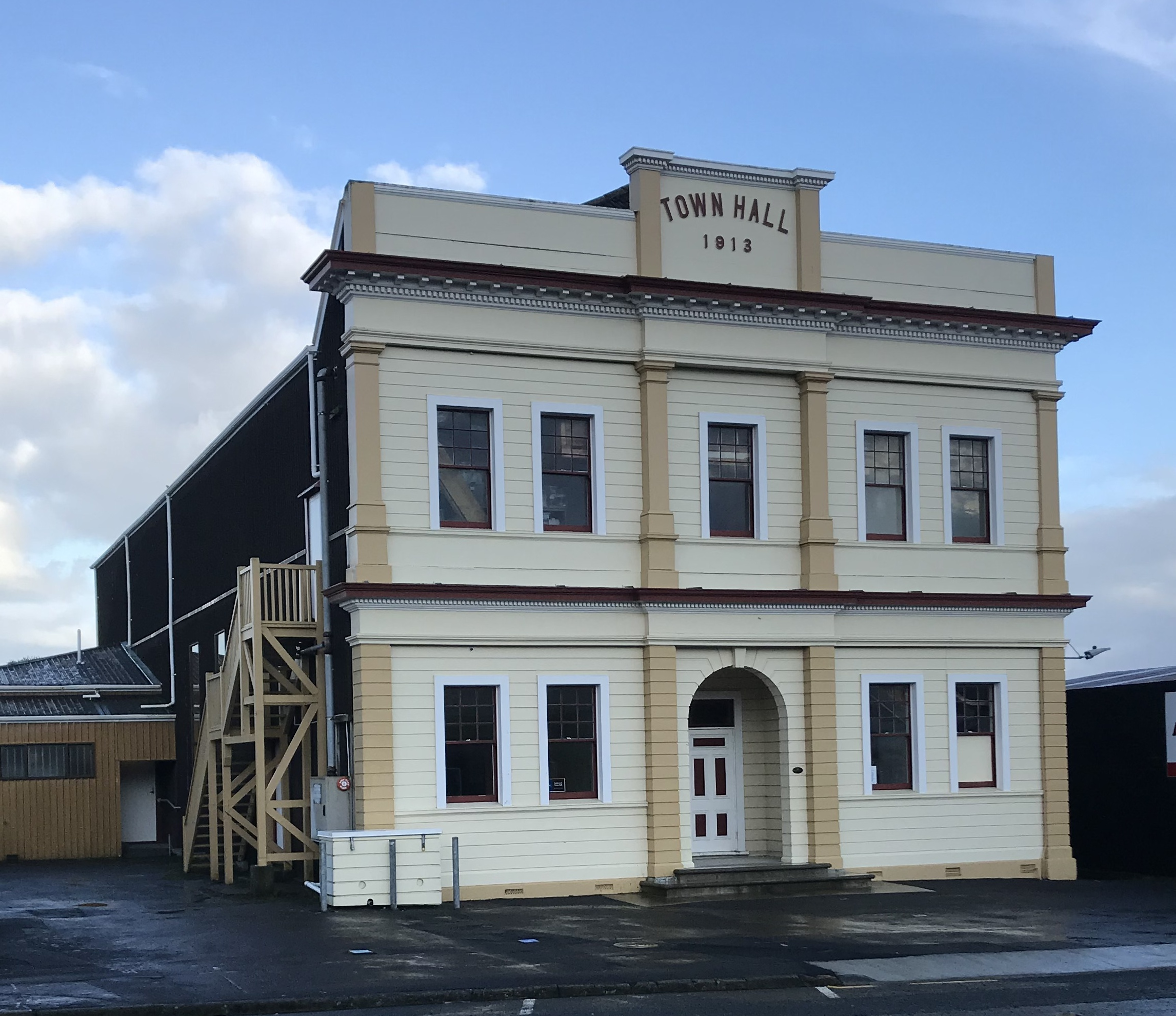
Town Hall, Inglewood

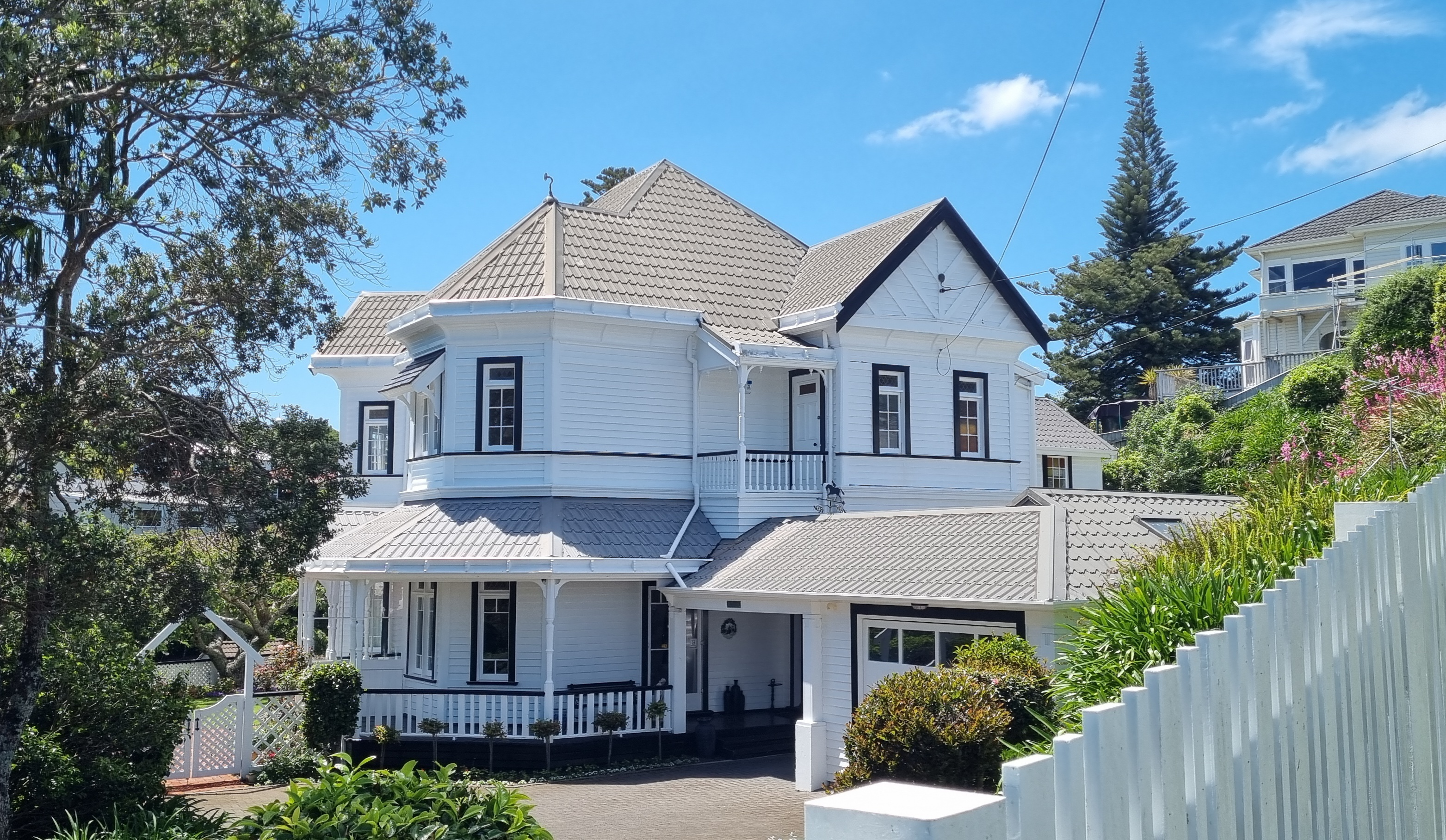
House at 7 Ridge Lane, New Plymouth

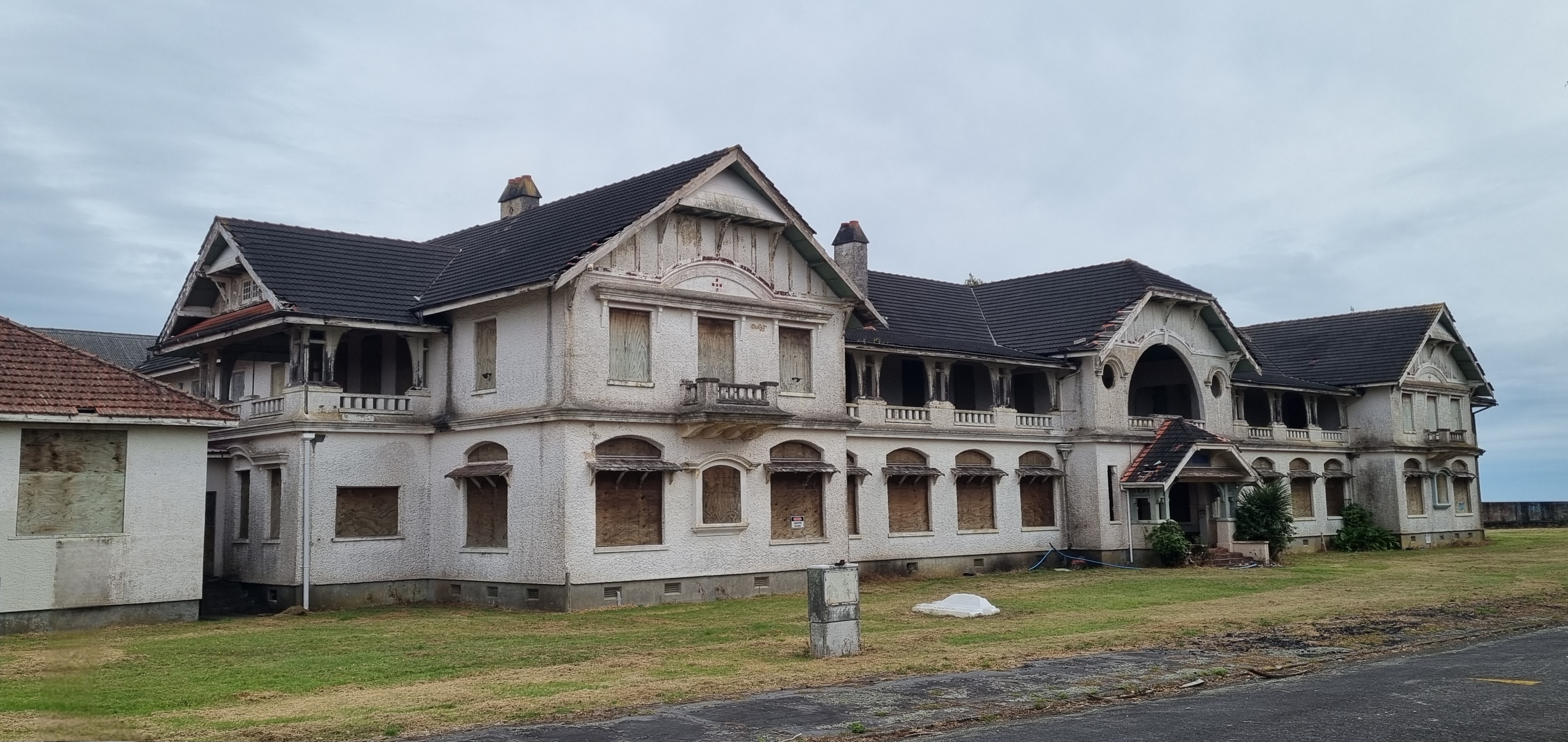
Barrett Hospital Nurse's home

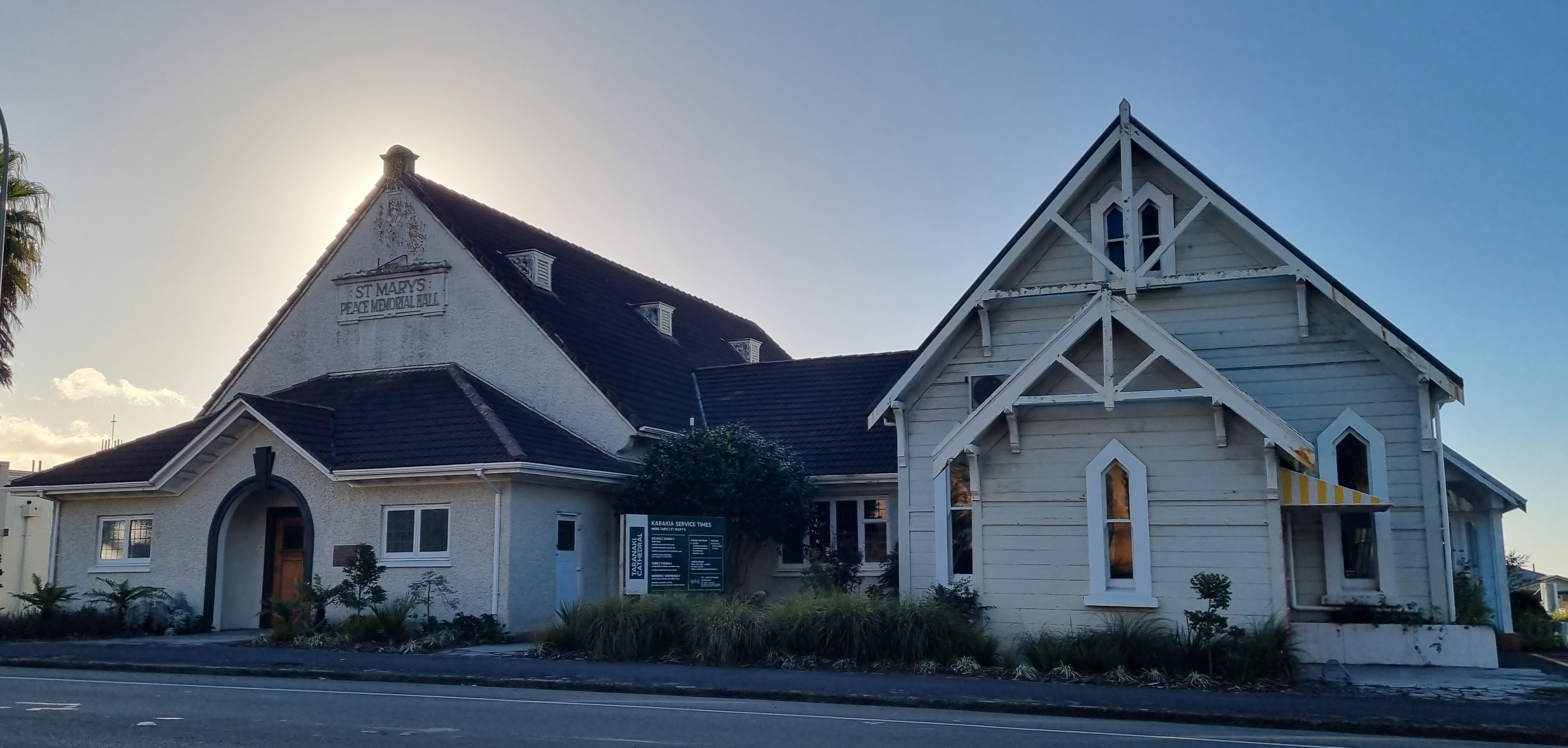
St Mary’s Peace Memorial Hall

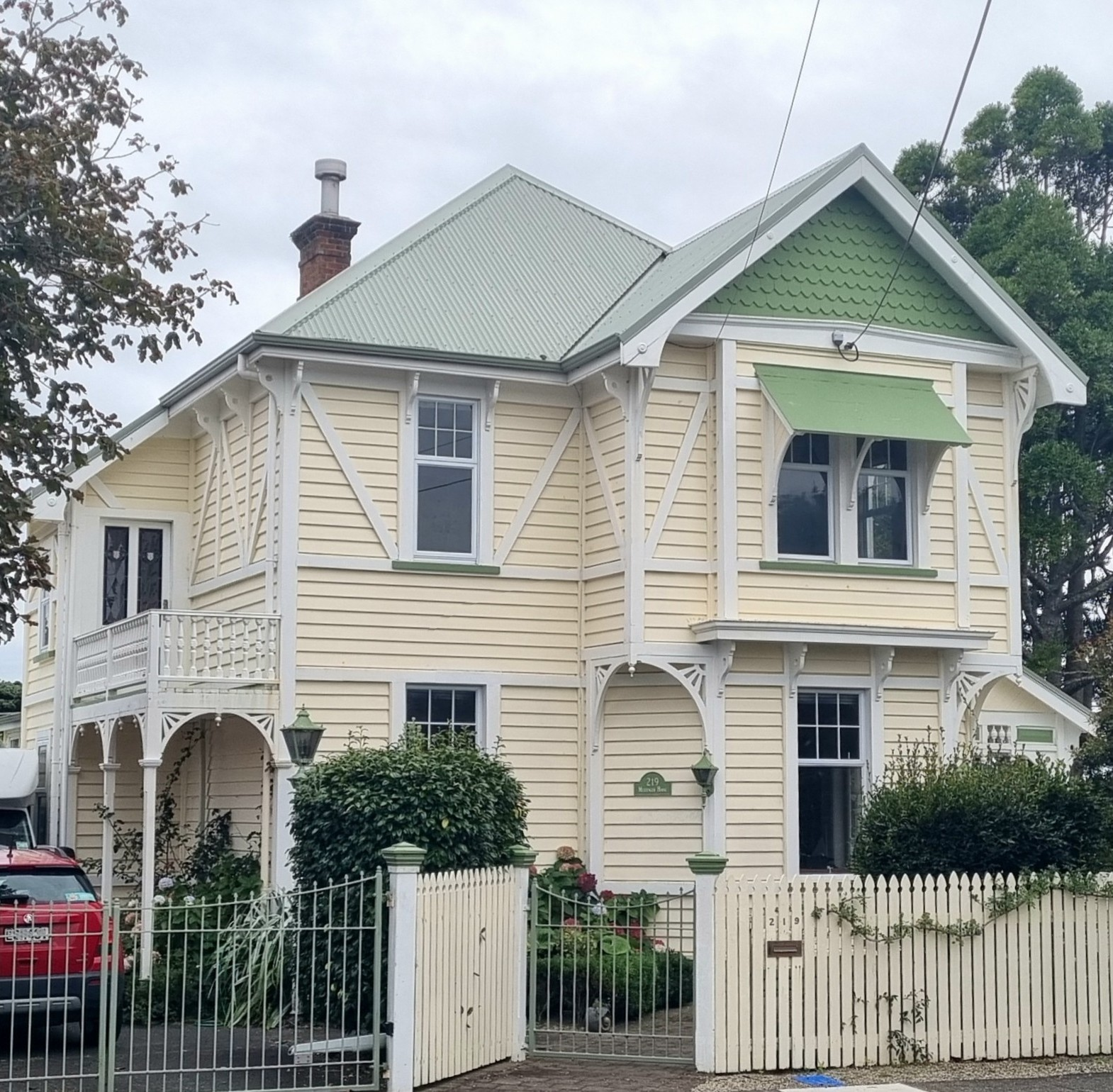
Frank Messenger’s House

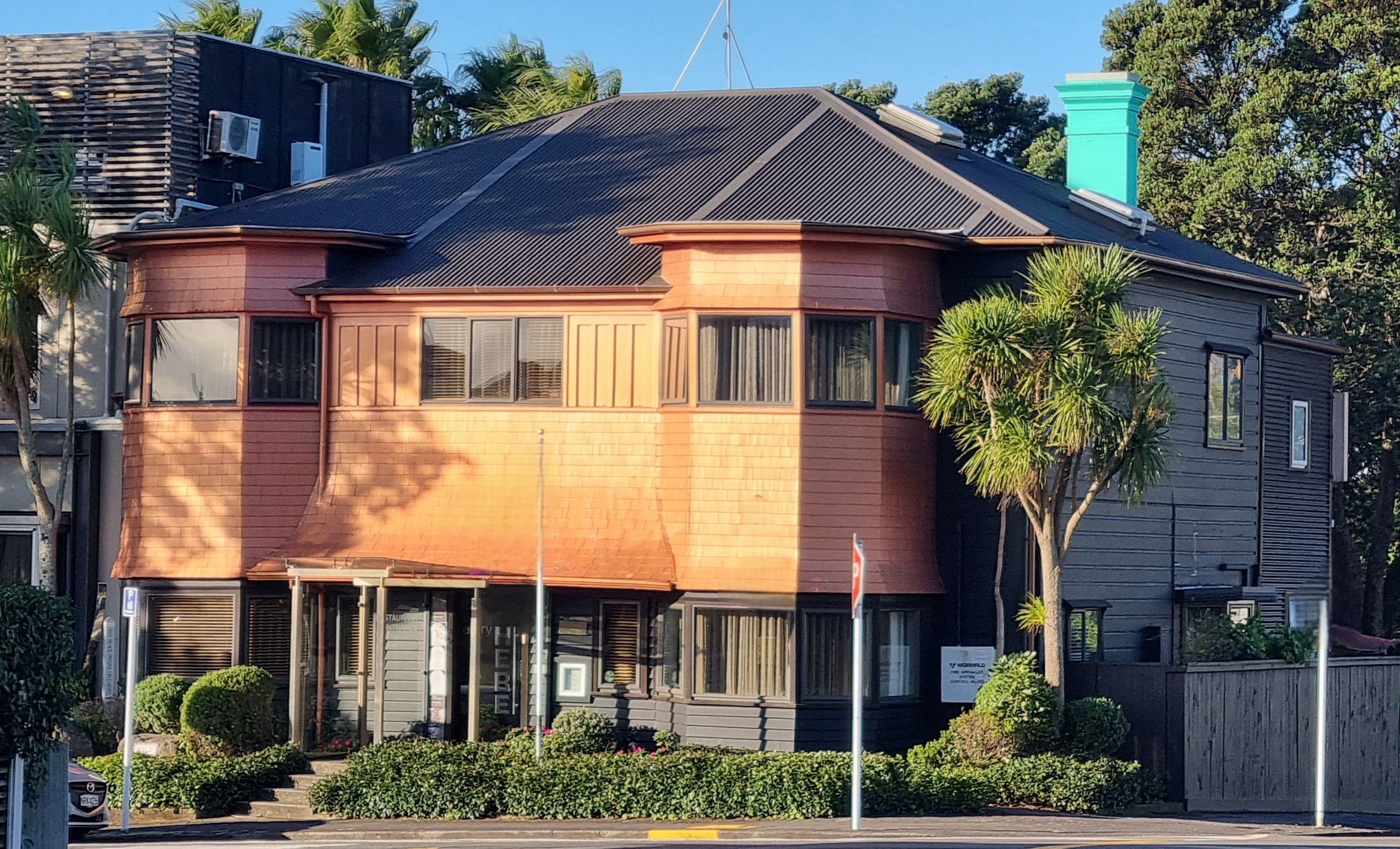
Dr. Walker’s home (now the Nice Hotel)

== Bibliography ==
- Pritchard, Ian; Frank Messenger, architect – The work of a New Plymouth architect, New Plymouth, 1994, ISBN 0-473-02500-0
