= New Plymouth Cenotaph =

War memorial in New Plymouth, New Zealand

- New Zealand
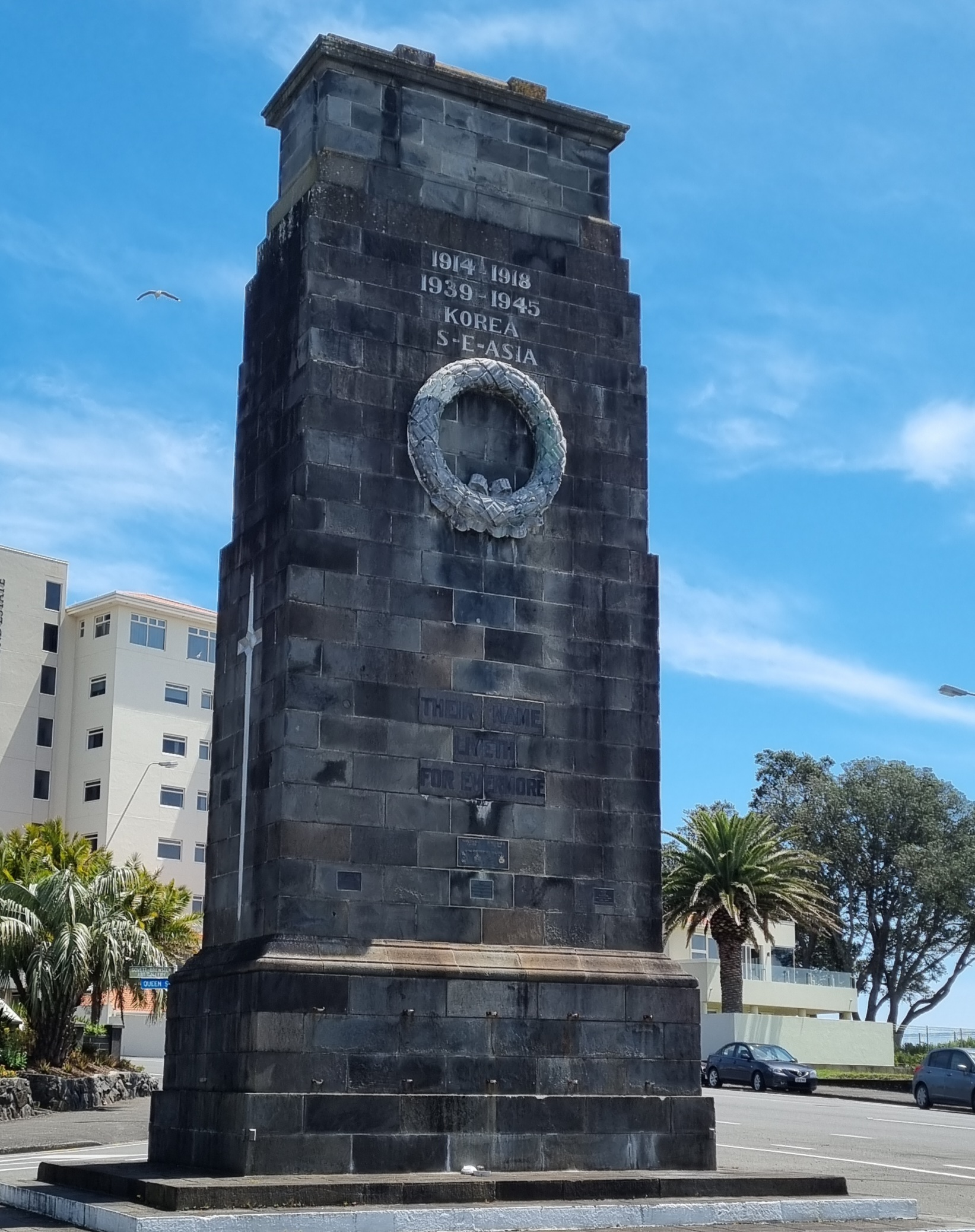
- New Plymouth Cenotaph
- For the New Zealand men dead of both world wars and later wars
- Unveiled: 16 September 1924; 101 years ago
- Location: 39.058104°S 174.086322°E; New Plymouth
- Designed by: Frank Messenger
- "1914–1918, 1939–1945, Korea, S–E–Asia, Their Name Liveth for Evermore"

Heritage New Zealand – Category 2
- Official name: Cenotaph
- Designated: 1 September 1983
- Reference no.: 885

The New Plymouth Cenotaph is a war memorial located at the intersection of Queen and St Aubyn Streets in New Plymouth, New Zealand. Unnveiled on 17 September 1924, it was designed by architect Frank Messenger and constructed in local andesite, closely modelled on the Whitehall Cenotaph in London. The monument commemorates those who served in the First and Second World Wars and later twentieth century conflicts, its strong sculptural form reinforcing its role as a lasting symbol of remembrance.

== History ==
In the years after the First World War, communities across the country raised funds for memorials to honour those who had served and those who had fallen. In 1923, a War Memorial Committee was convened in New Plymouth to appoint an architect and to advance additional fundraising efforts. The Committee resolved to engage Frank Messenger, the city’s senior architect, to prepare plans and costings.

Messenger’s design, influenced by the Whitehall Cenotaph in London, proposed construction in local stone, a choice that initially raised concerns regarding expense. The contract was ultimately awarded to J. G. M. Russell, J. McCracken and A. Handley, to construct the cenotaph in grey andesite sourced from a Mangorei quarry. Despite the higher cost, the use of local stone was regarded as a more appropriate and dignified tribute to New Plymouth’s war dead.

After weeks of preparations, the works to raise the cenotaph began on 4 March 1924. The memorial was formally unveiled on 16 September 1924 by the Governor‑General, Admiral Lord Jellicoe, during a ceremony that created much public interest, despite the heavy rain on the day.

In the 1980s, sculptor Filipe Tohe added inscriptions commemorating the Secord World War and conflicts in Korea and Southeast Asia.

Since its unveiling, the Cenotaph has served as the central site for ANZAC Day commemorations in New Plymouth.

== Description ==
The Cenotaph is a simple rectangular monument, 10 metres in height, set upon a stepped base measuring 8 metres x 6 metres. A symbolic empty casket crowns the structure. Crusader crosses mark the narrow north and south faces, while marble wreaths carved by local monumental stonemason William Francis Short and the inscription "1914–1918, Their Name Liveth for Evermore" appear on the east and west sides.

Subsequent additions have been limited. In the 1980s, sculptor Filipe Tohe added an inscription acknowledging the World War II, the Korean War, and conflicts in Southeast Asia. Bronze anniversary plaques were affixed to the east face in 1995.

== Image gallery ==
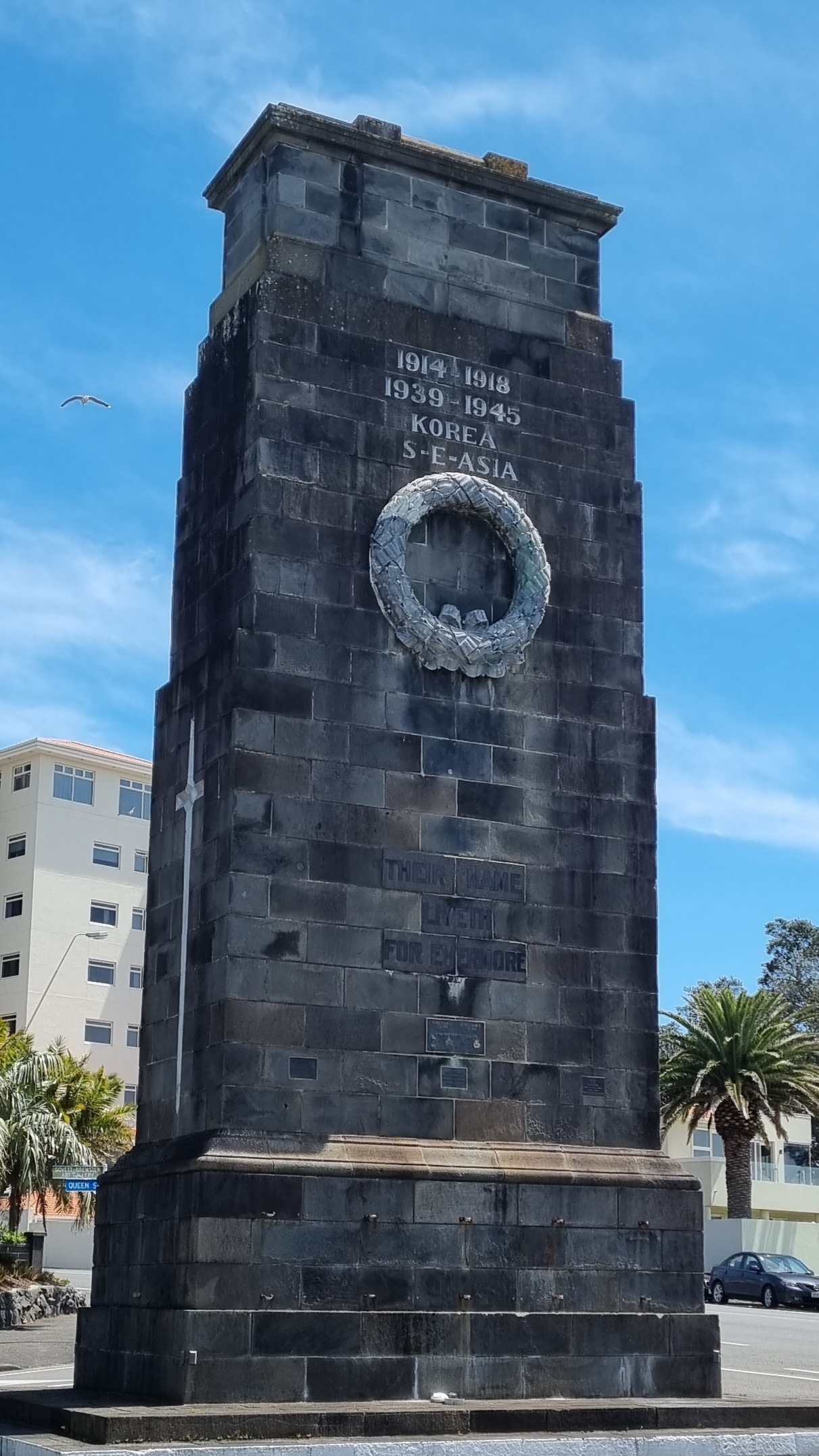
Cenotaph
East side

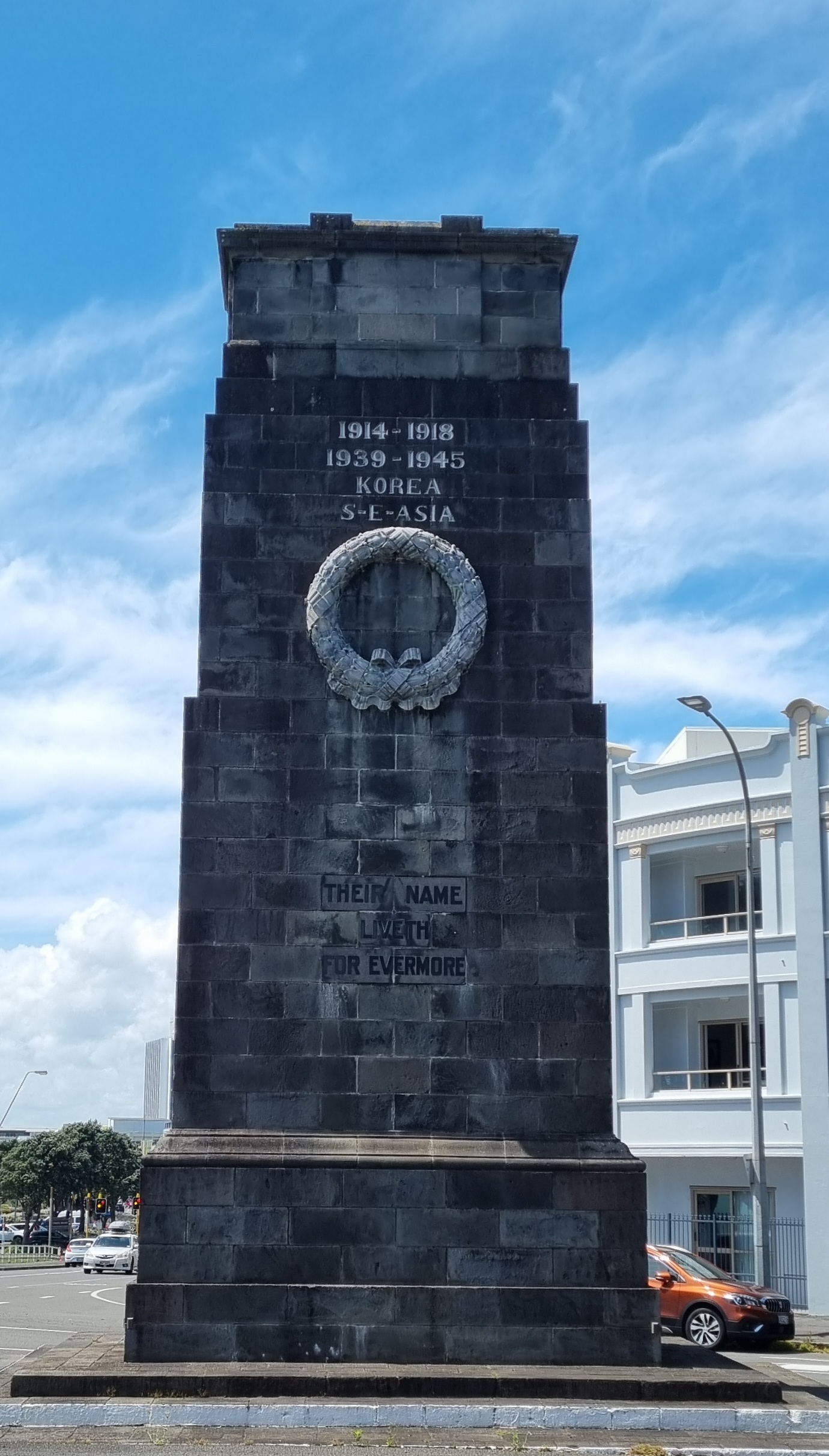
Cenotaph
West side

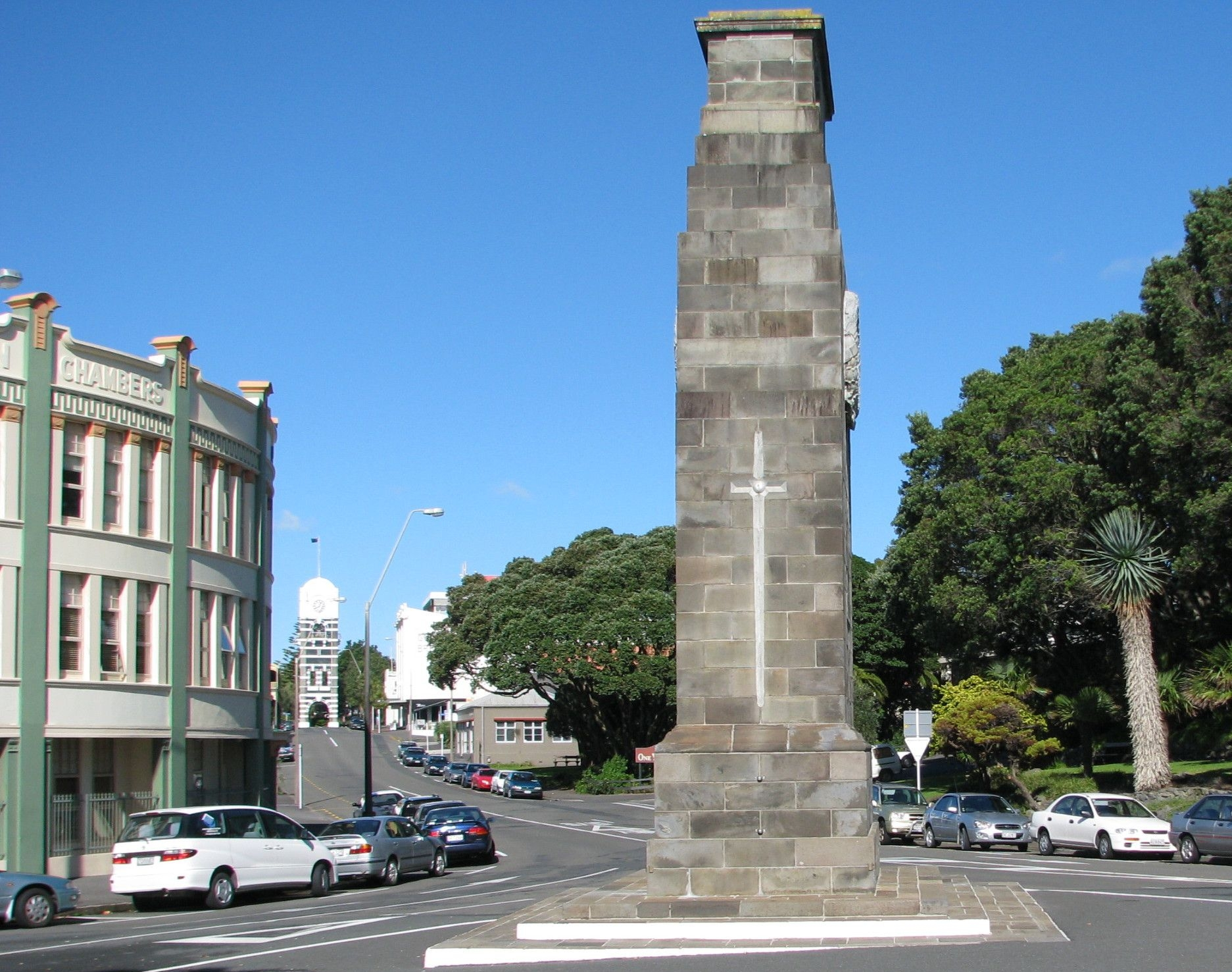
Cenotaph
North side

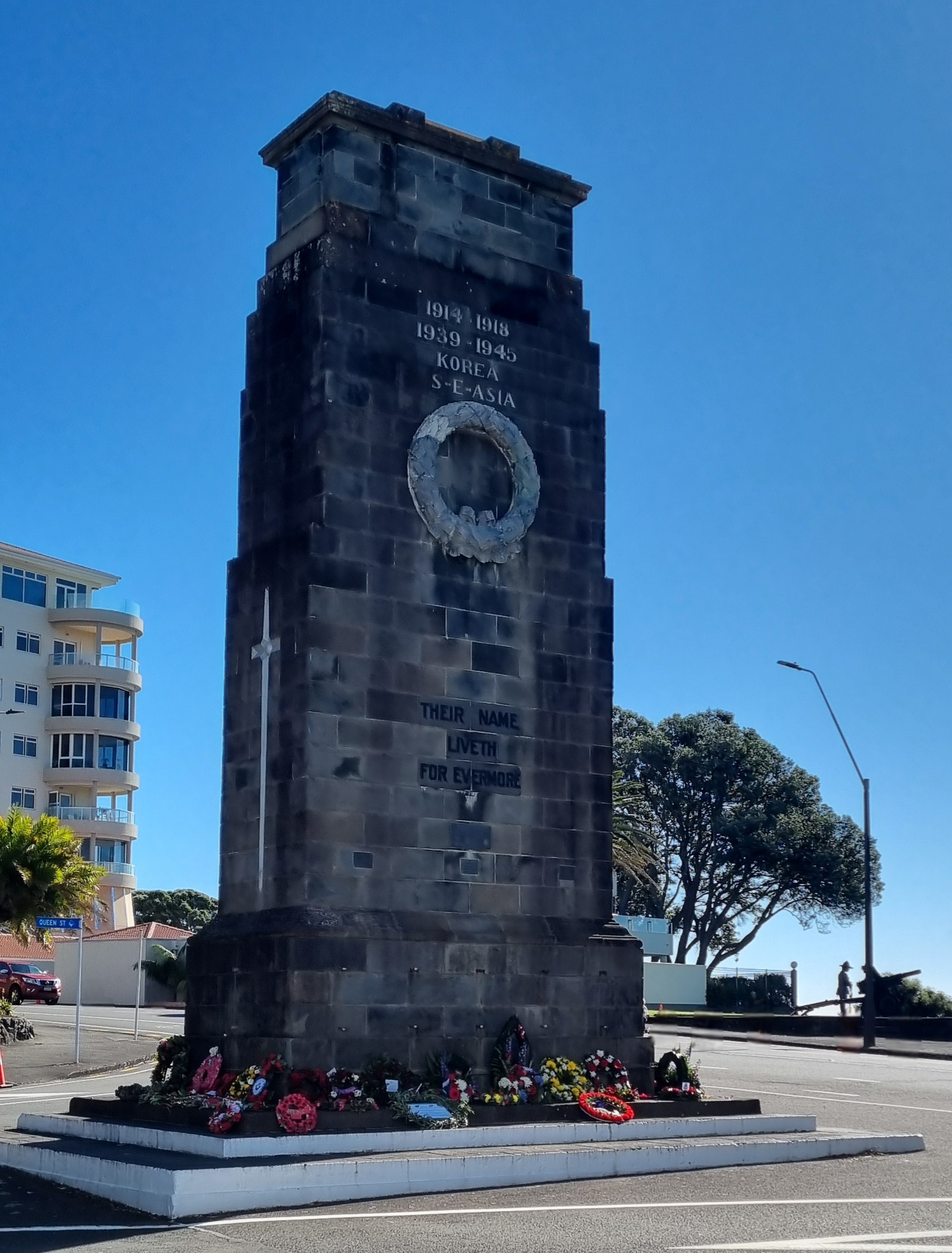
Cenotaph on
ANZAC Day

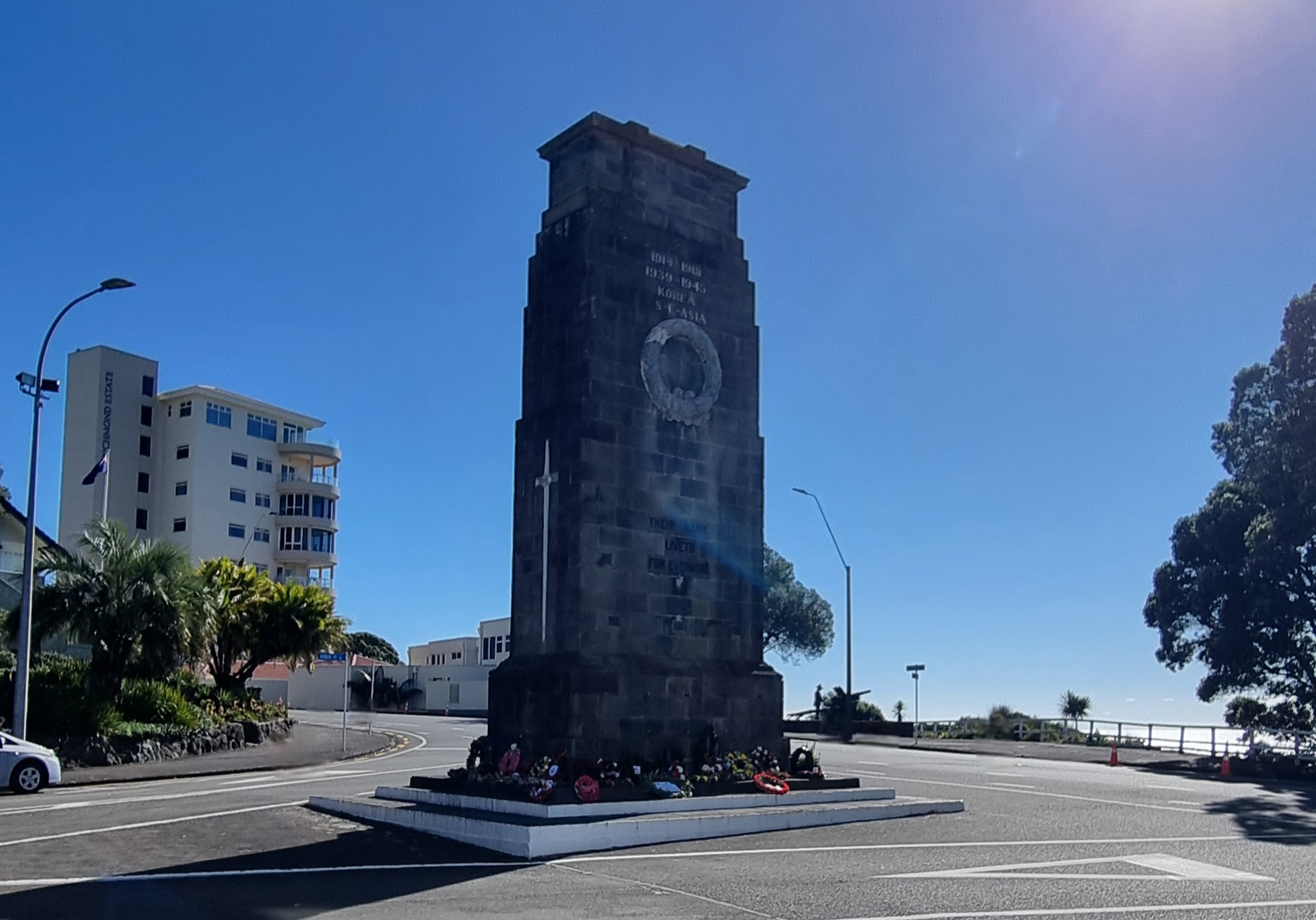
Cenotaph on
ANZAC Day
