= White Hart Hotel, New Plymouth =

Historic building in New Plymouth, New Zealand

White Hart Hotel New Plymouth
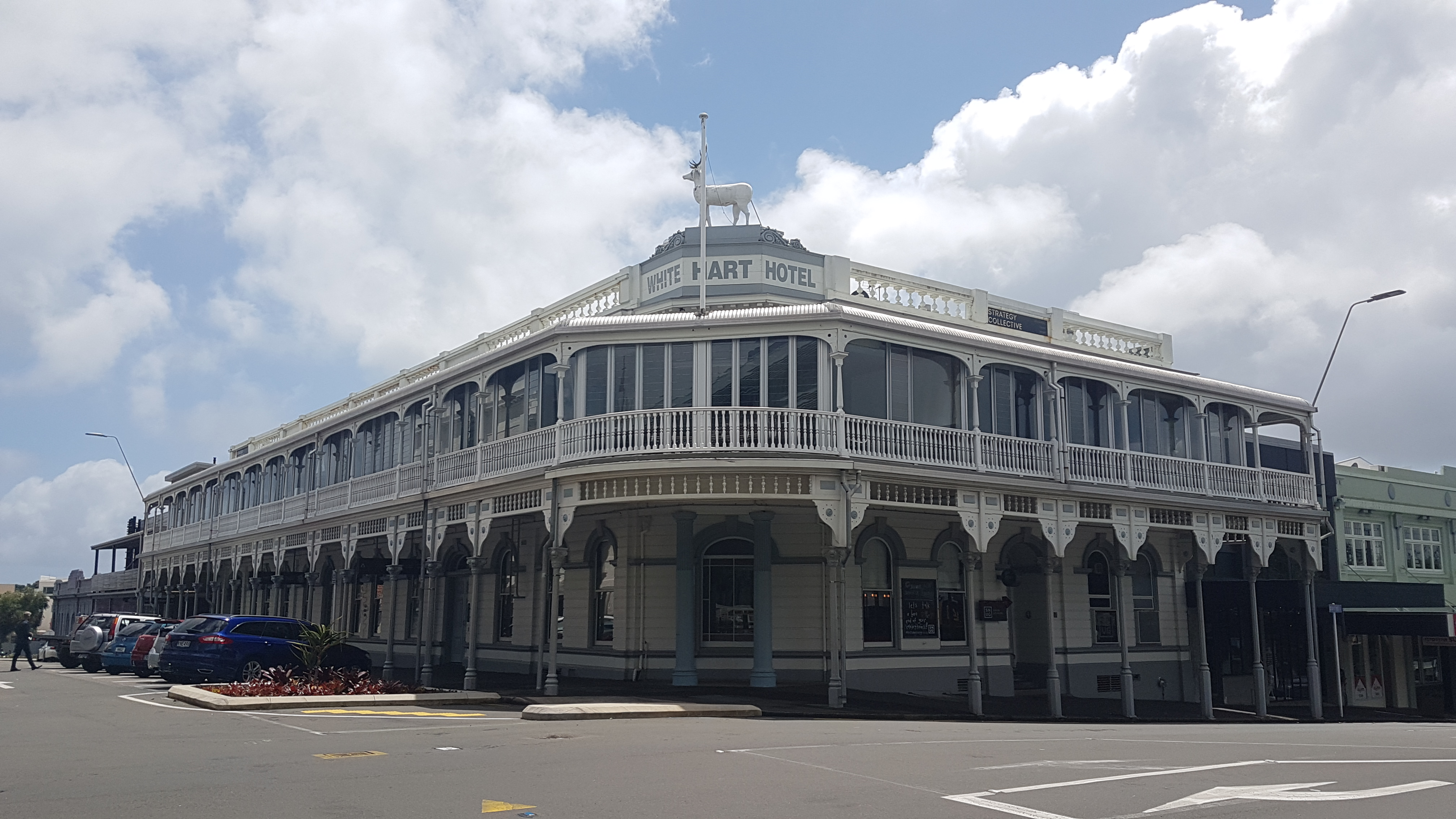
- White Hart Hotel
- Interactive map of the White Hart Hotel New Plymouth area

General information
- Location: 118–124 Devon Street West and Queen Street, New Plymouth, New Zealand
- Coordinates: 39.058482°S 174.070696°E
- Completed: 1886

Design and construction
- Architects: James Sanderson; Francis (Frank) Messenger

Heritage New Zealand – Category 1
- Designated: 4 April 1985
- Reference no.: 149

The White Hart Hotel is one of the heritage buildings from New Plymouth, registered by Heritage New Zealand as a Category 1 Historic Place. Situated on the corner of Devon Street West and Queen Street, the White Hart Hotel was built of timber in 1886 to replace the original hotel of 1844.

== History ==
The original building from 1844 was a house with six rooms, built just four years after the foundation of the New Zealand colony. During its life the house also served as a refuge for destitutes, as temporary accommodation for early settlers and as a hospital for soldiers during the First and Second Taranaki Wars. In 1859, it was transformed into a hotel and sold for removal by auction in 1886.

The same year it was built the first part of the current White Hart Hotel, designed by local architect James Sanderson in an Italianate palazzo style. Built as a classic timber Victorian construction in rimu and mataī, the façade included round-headed windows on the ground floor and square headed on the second floor, now largely hidden by the extensive balconies added in 1909.

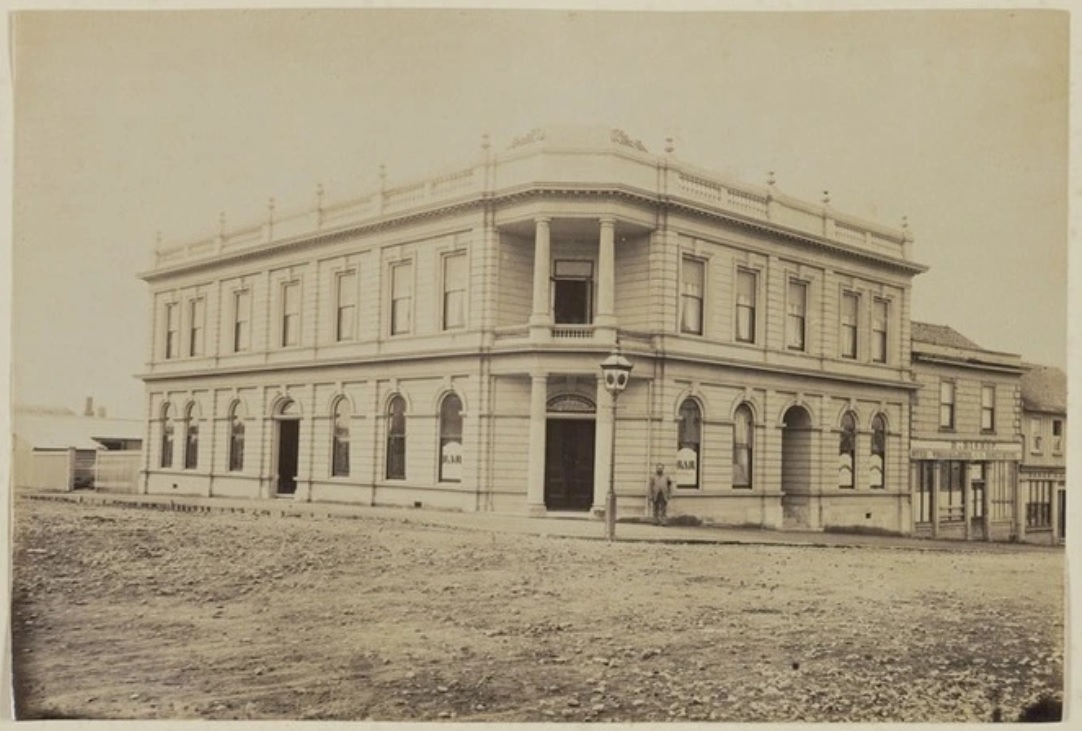
White Hart Hotel in 1886

The hotel was extended in 1900 and in 1901 it received its icon, the statue of the white hart above the corner parapet. The balconies which run the extent of the façade and are the hotel's distinctive feature, were added in 1909. They were designed by another local architect, Francis John (Frank) Messenger. Subsequently, the five corner bays of the first floor verandah were filled in.

On 22 July 1916, the hotel was the only building in the block between Devon, Queen, King and Egmont Streets not to be destroyed by the fire that cleared the entire area, including the Theatre Royal.

During the 1970s the White Hart became known as a venue for New Plymouth's rock and punk music scenes and was also home to the Magog Motorcycle Club.

Meanwhile, in recent decades, the building deteriorated into a serious state of decay. Although listed as a Heritage New Zealand Category 1 building, the cost of restoration seemed to be prohibitive for a while. In 2005 the building's owner Renaissance Ltd and Wellington firm Atelierworkshop started the plans to restore the façade, while retaining as much as possible of the building's character. The work started in 2011 with financial support from the New Plymouth District Council and Heritage New Zealand. The building was strengthened, the ground floor was rebuilt, the second floor transformed by glazing the upstairs verandas, and incorporating part of it into the building to create a new floor. The old ceiling structure from the 1886 building has been left uncovered. Also it was created an internal covered courtyard with an fireplace. An alleyway from the courtyard connects onto the street.

During the restoration works, the builders uncovered cobblestones from the original 1844 house and Atelierworkshop designed a glass floor over the top so visitors can have a look at the site's earlier history.

== Image gallery ==
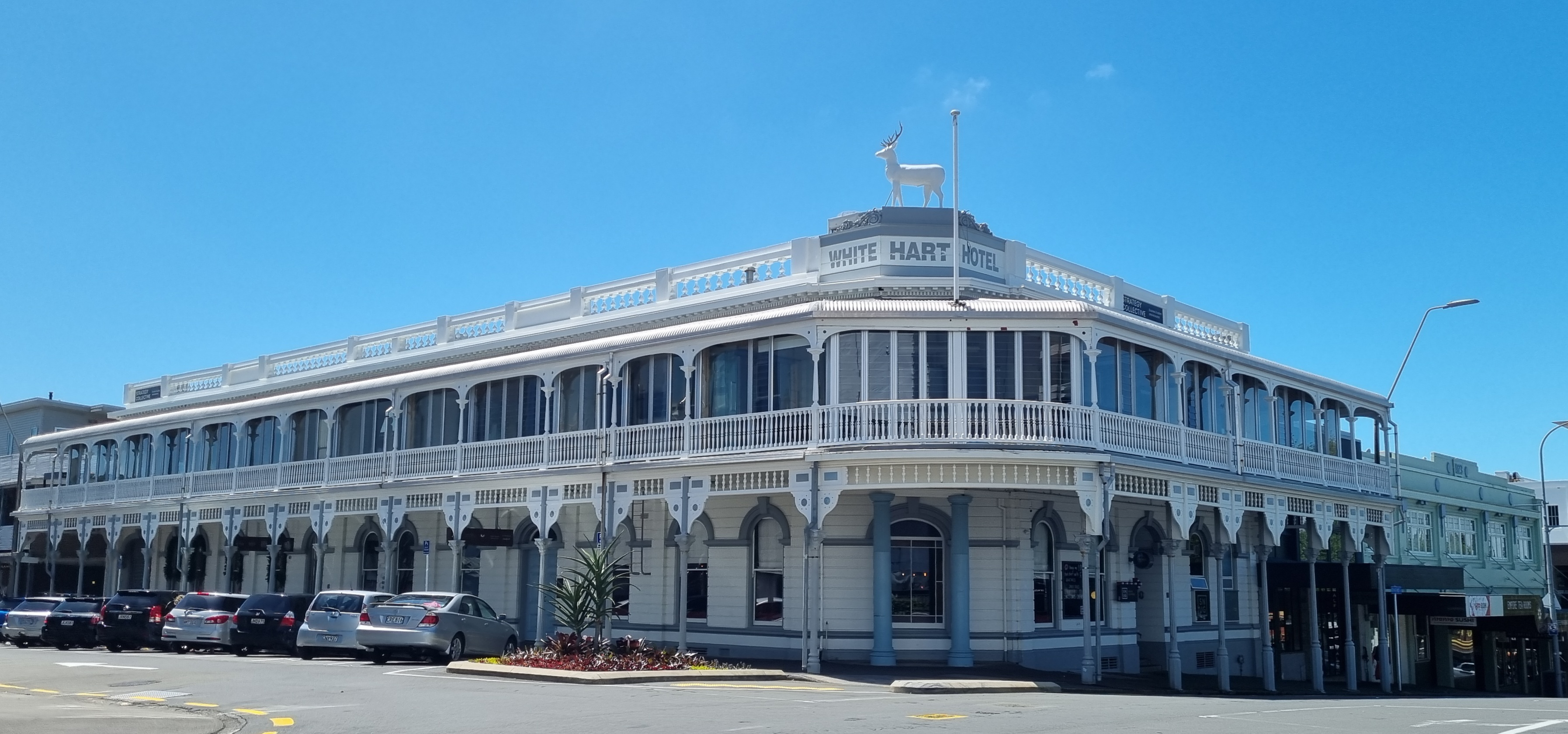
White Hart Hotel

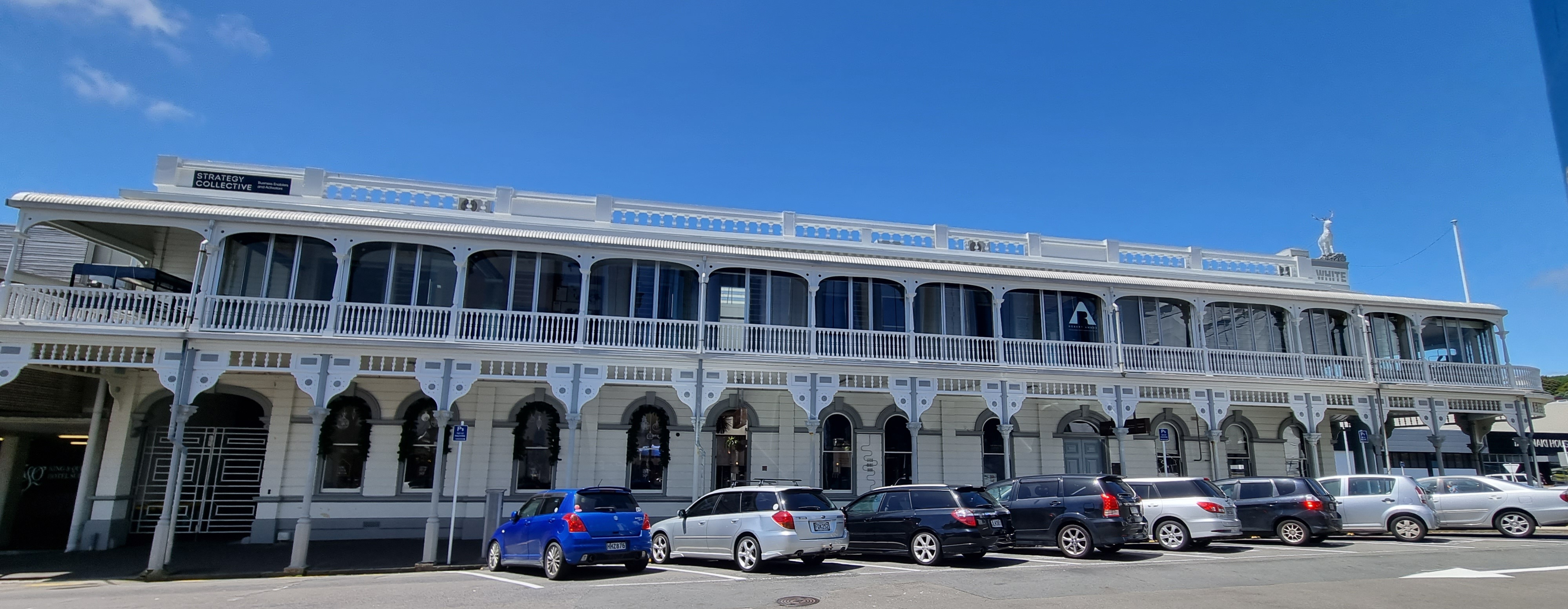
White Hart Hotel
west side

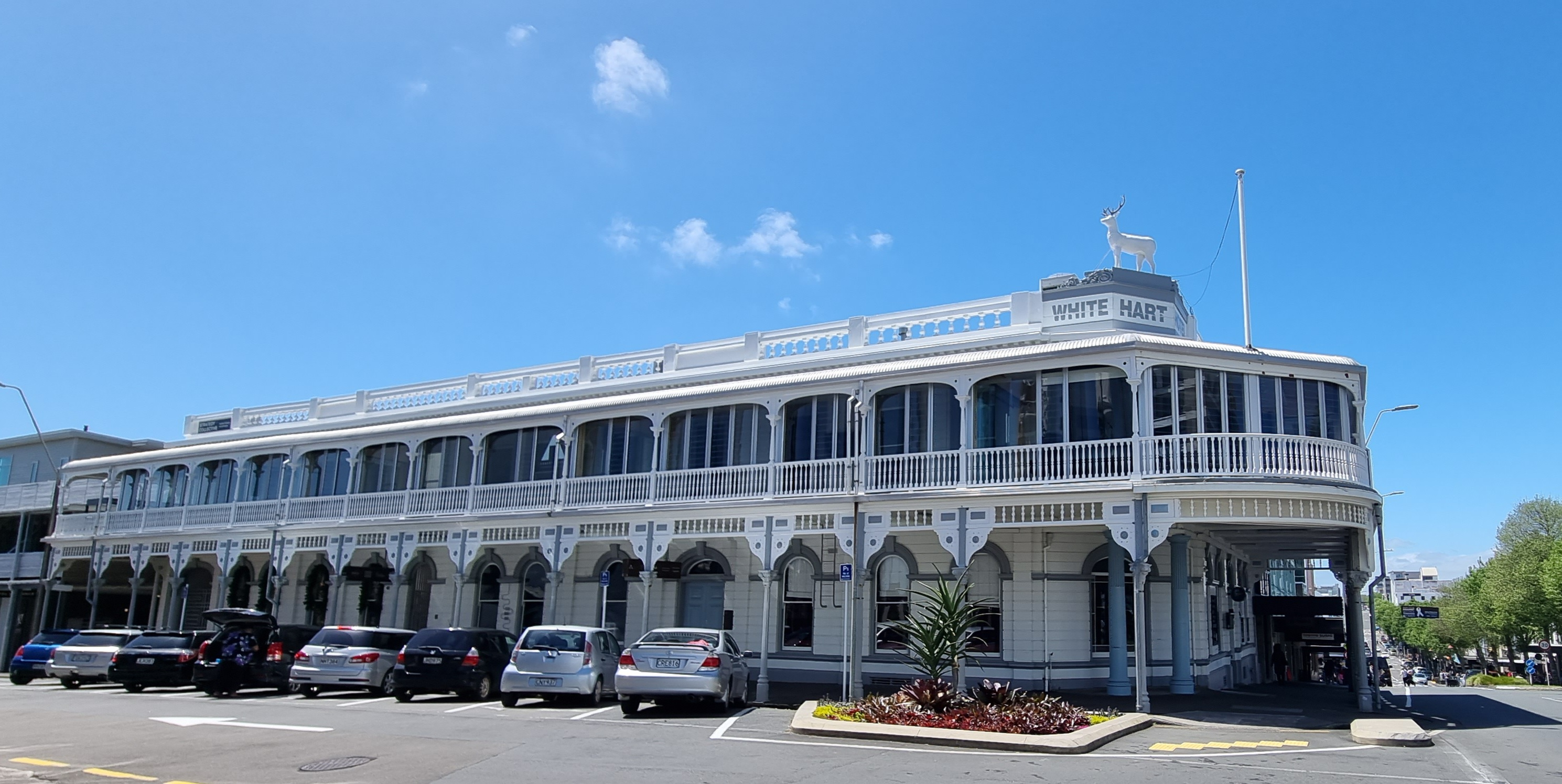
White Hart Hotel and Devon Street

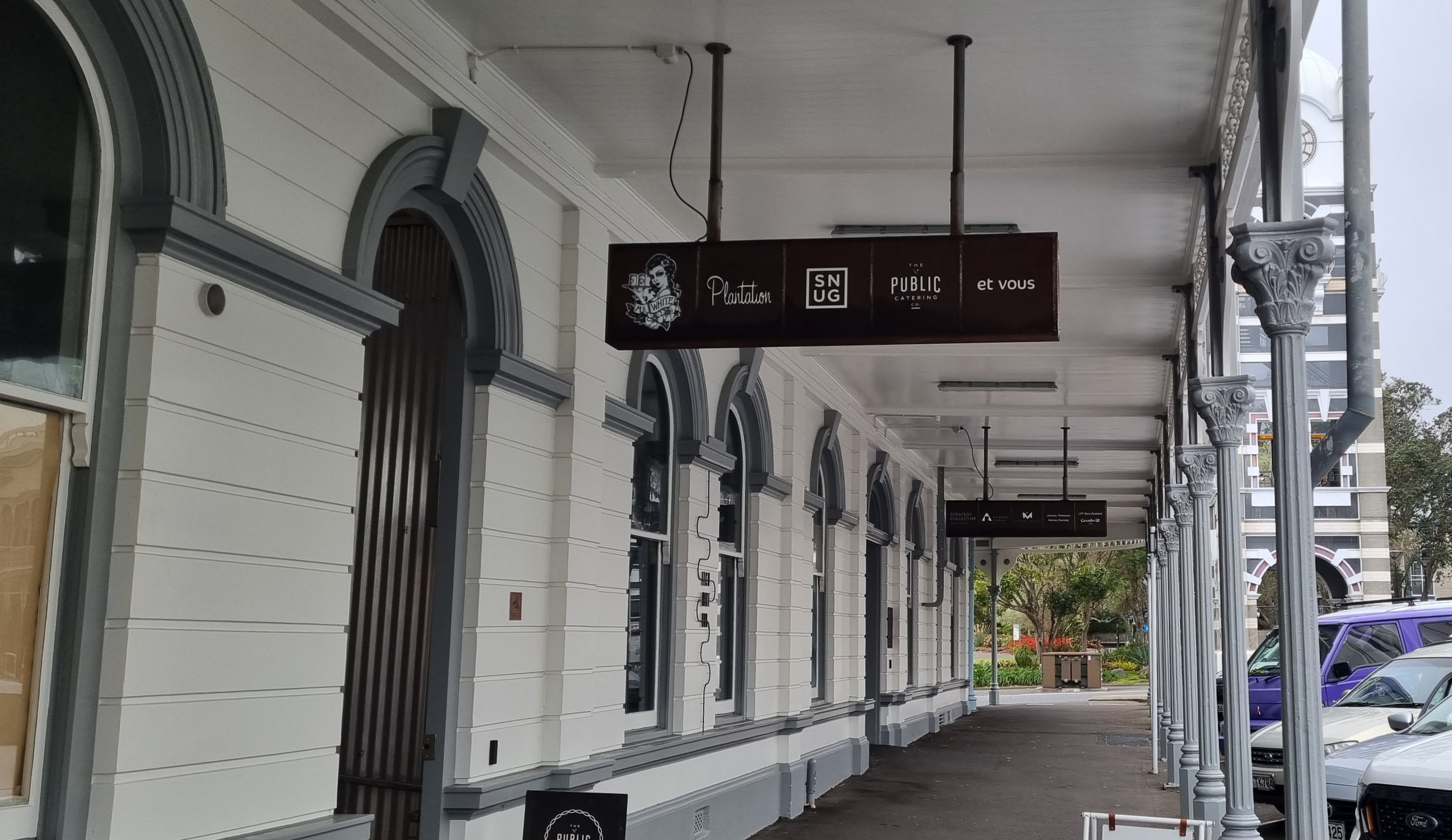
The ground floor façade

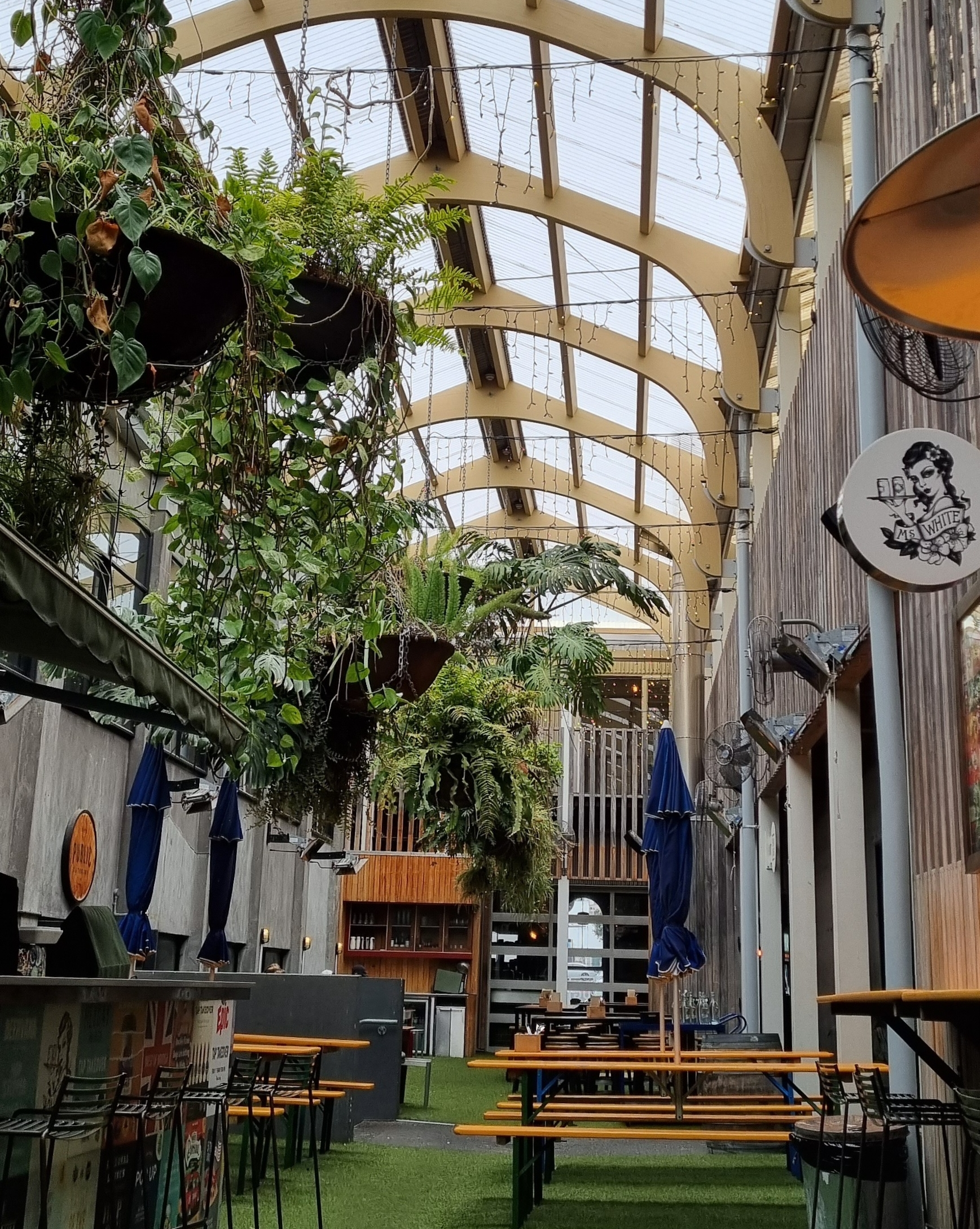
The internal covered courtyard

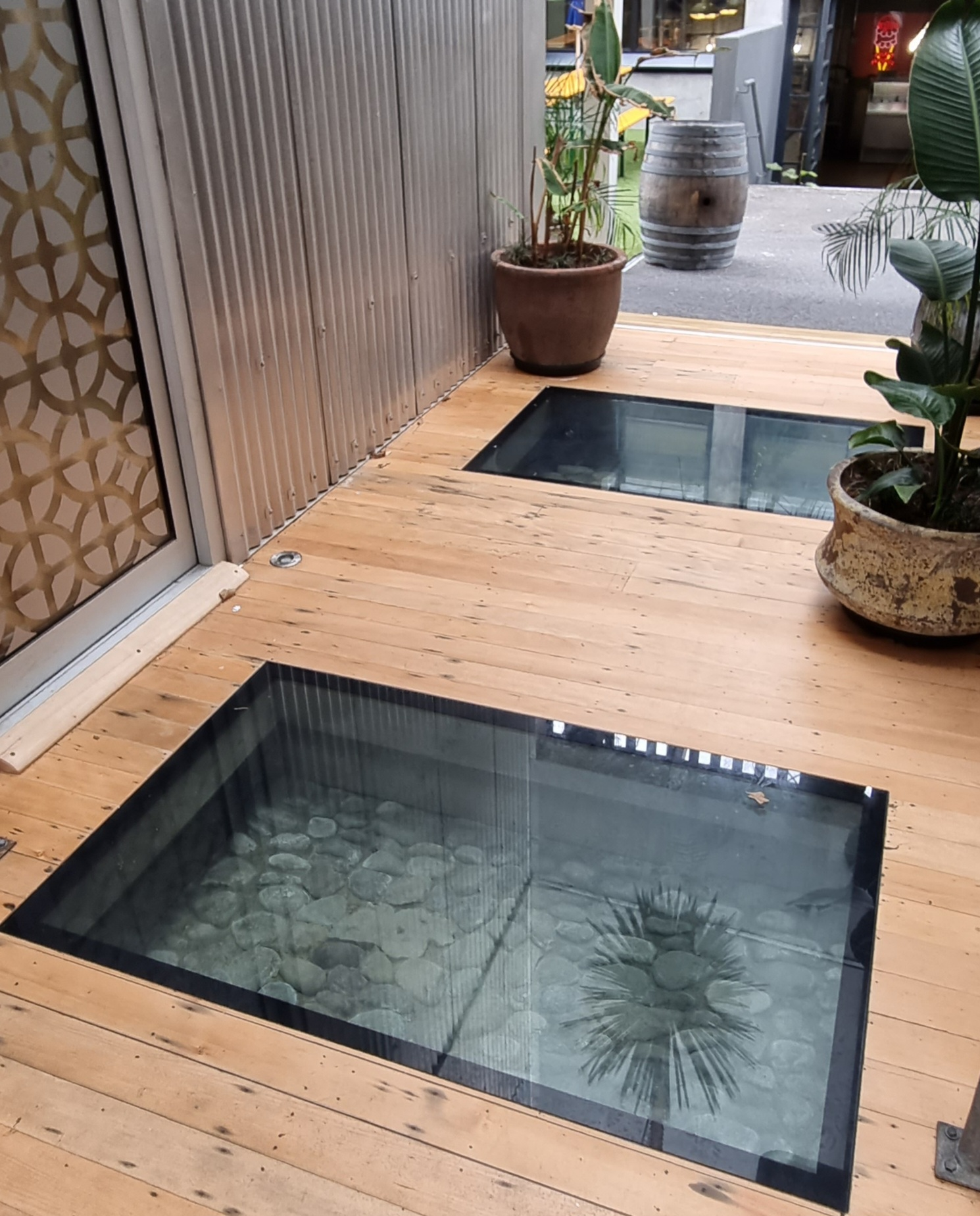
Old cobblestones under glass floor

== Bibliography ==
- Heritage New Zealand, New Zealand Heritage List
- Harvey, Justine; White Hart Hotel, Architecture New Zealand, September 2012 (Issue 5)
