= Bates House, New Plymouth =

Heritage building in New Plymouth, New Zealand

Bates House New Plymouth
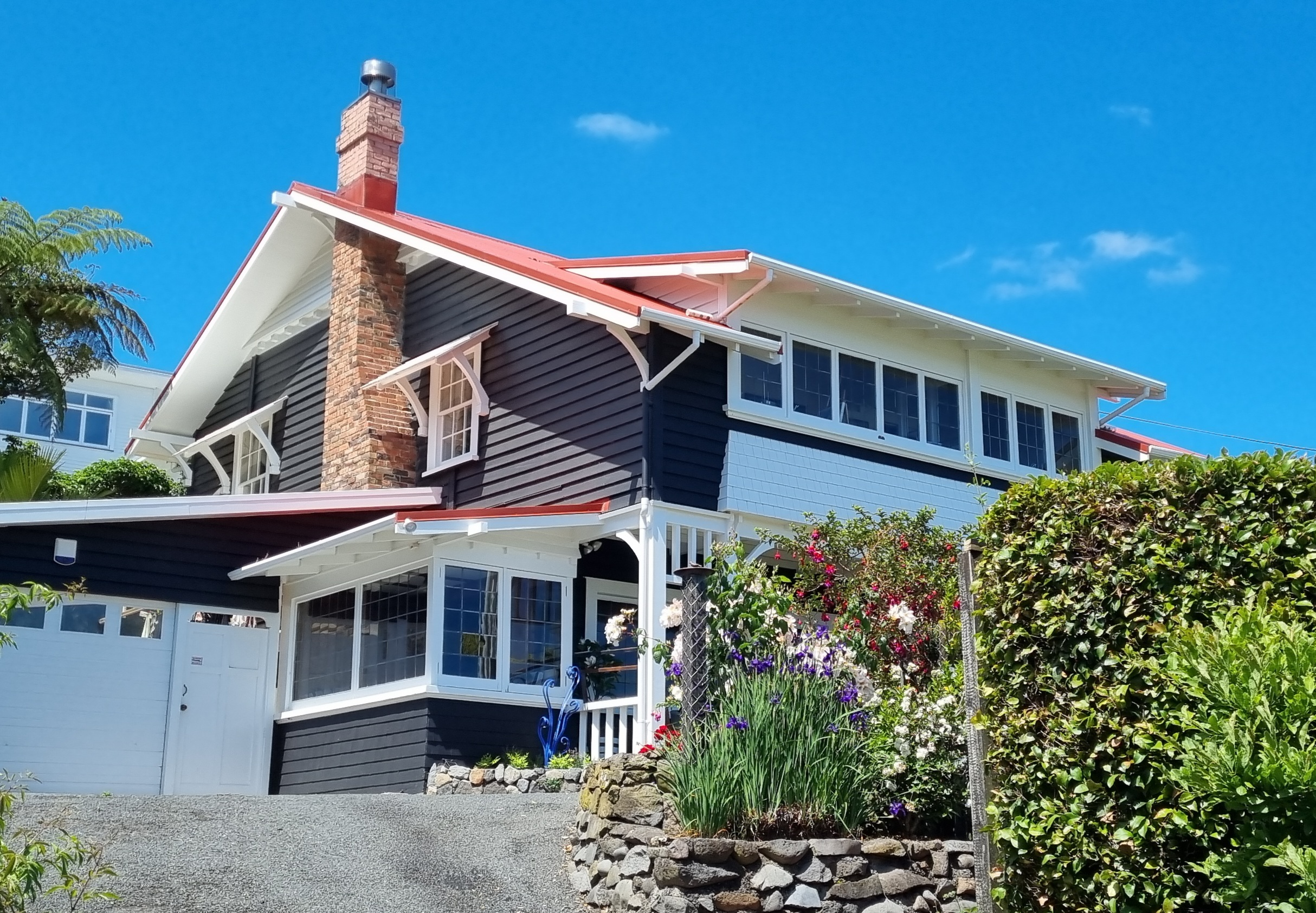
- Bates House
- Interactive map of the Bates House; New Plymouth area

General information
- Architectural style: California bungalow
- Location: 124 Pendarves Street, New Plymouth, New Zealand
- Coordinates: 39.058104°S 174.086322°E

Design and construction
- Architect: Thomas Herbert Bates

Heritage New Zealand – Category 2
- Designated: 3 March 1995
- Reference no.: 7222

Bates House from New Plymouth, New Zealand is a Category 2 heritage building registered by Heritage New Zealand, located at 124 Pendarves Street, New Plymouth Central. Originally built as a small cottage, it was extensively redesigned and rebuilt in 1921–1924 by its owner, the local architect Thomas Herbert Bates, to serve as his personal residence.

== History ==
Thomas Herbert Bates was born in Adelaide, Australia, qualified as an architect and, after traveling to Britain and US, in 1908 came to New Zealand. In 1916, during the First World War, Bates moved to New Plymouth where he set up his own business in King Building on Devon Street.

He designed many public and domestic buildings in different styles in and around New Plymouth, including the New Plymouth Opera House (now TSB Showplace).

Bates is also recognised for his domestic designs, particularly those in the California bungalow style, including his own two-storey home. Originally built as a small cottage, it was extensively redesigned and rebuilt in 1921–1924 by Bates, to serve as his personal residence.

== Description ==
The two-storey, California bungalow-designed house is "representative of 1920's domestic architecture for upper middle class New Zealand", according to Heritage NZ. The building is timber with shiplap weatherboard cladding and has a brick chimney.

The design reflects Arts & Crafts principles, prioritising simplicity, honesty in materials, and high-quality craftsmanship. Bates house includes specific elements, such as low pitched roofs and wide eaves, a sleeping veranda, leaded windows, and built-in furniture, all of a high quality.
