= Thomas Herbert Bates =

New Zealand architect (1873–1954)

- Thomas Herbert Bates
- Born: Thomas Herbert Bates; 22 December 1873; Adelaide, Australia
- Died: 13 March 1954 (aged 80); Singapore
- Occupation: Architect
- Buildings: New Plymouth Opera House

Thomas Herbert Bates (22 December 1873 – 13 March 1954) was a New Zealand architect, based in New Plymouth. He is noted mainly for several buildings he designed in the centre of New Plymouth, some of them now having heritage status.

== Early life ==
Thomas H. Bates was born in Adelaide, Australia on 22 December 1873. He grew up and was educated there, at the School of Mines and Industries. Bates stayed in the city as a draughtsman and married Emma Watson, with whom he had six children. One of his daughters, Maud Walker, was a talented draughtswoman who later assisted her father on many of his architectural plans.

Around 1900, Thomas Bates travelled to Britain to widen his experience, then went to San Francisco and worked for a number of firms there as an architect, helping with the reconstruction of the city after the 1906 earthquake.

== Life in New Zealand ==
In 1908, Bates came to New Zealand and got a contract at Auckland Grammar School. Then, in 1916, during the First World War, he moved to New Plymouth through an offer to supervise the building of the auditorium of the "Everybody's Theatre" (later known as the Mayfair) on behalf of Auckland architects Grierson and Aimer. After completing this job, he got a similar contract from Frederick de Jersey Clere for AMP Building on the corner of Devon and Egmont Streets (now "Peggy Gordon's Celtic Bar").

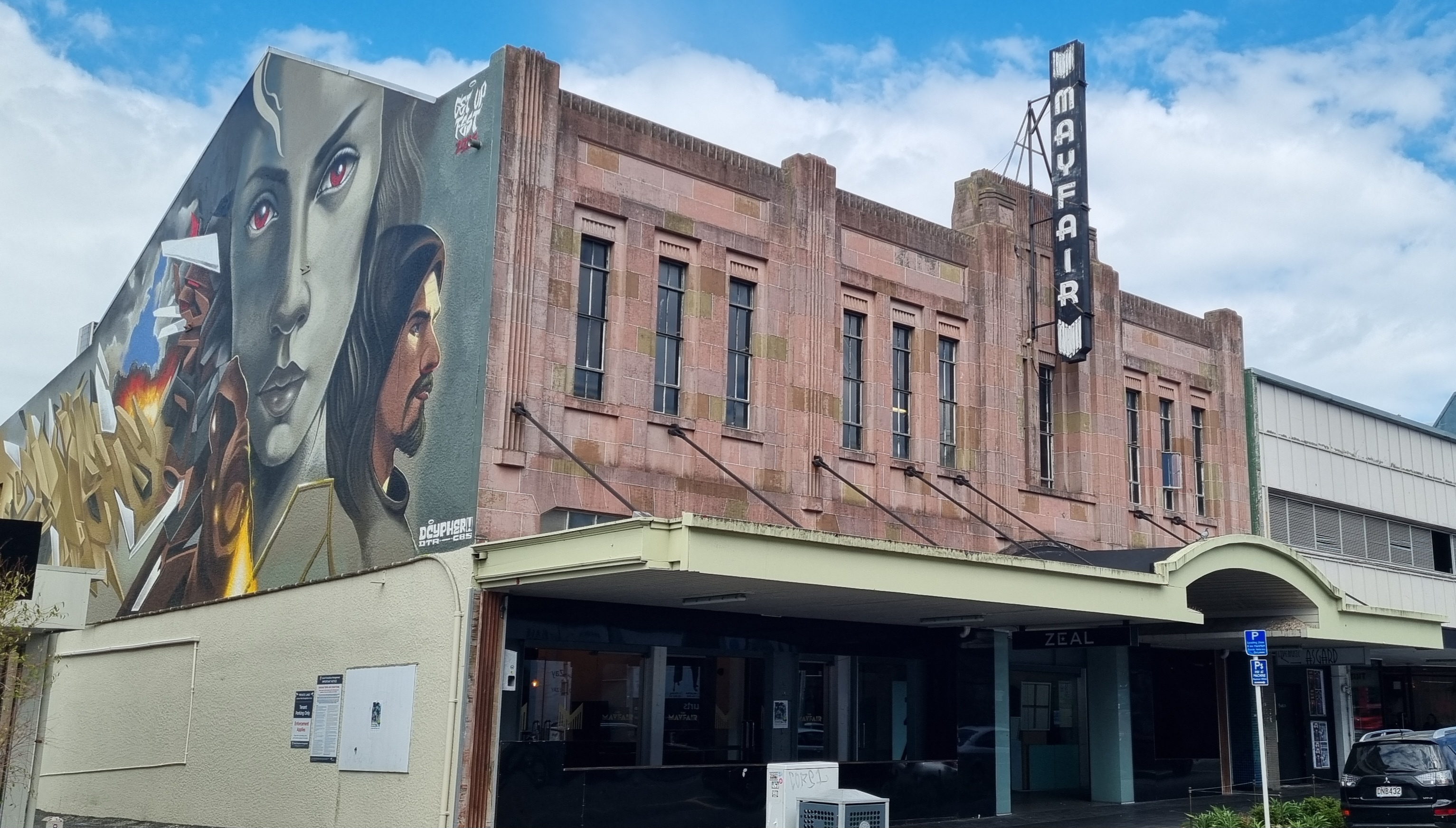
Mayfair, New Plymouth

After that, Bates set up his own business in King Building on Devon Street. His first project was the design and construction of McEwan's Building on King Street, which was demolished in 1996. He designed many public and domestic buildings in different styles in and around New Plymouth: Bank of New Zealand branches, several dairy factories, the New Zealand Insurance Building on Devon Street (1920), the Taranaki Club Building (1922), the neoclassical State Fire Insurance Building (1924), the four-storey Colliers Building (1926), the Hookers Building (1927), the Public Trust offices in New Plymouth and Stratford, the Christian Science Church, the Taranaki Daily News (Roebuck House), the Art Deco YWCA (1929/1934), the Taranaki Producers’ Freezing Works Company cool stores, the Empire (now Victoria) Building, and the memorial gates at New Plymouth Boys' High School.

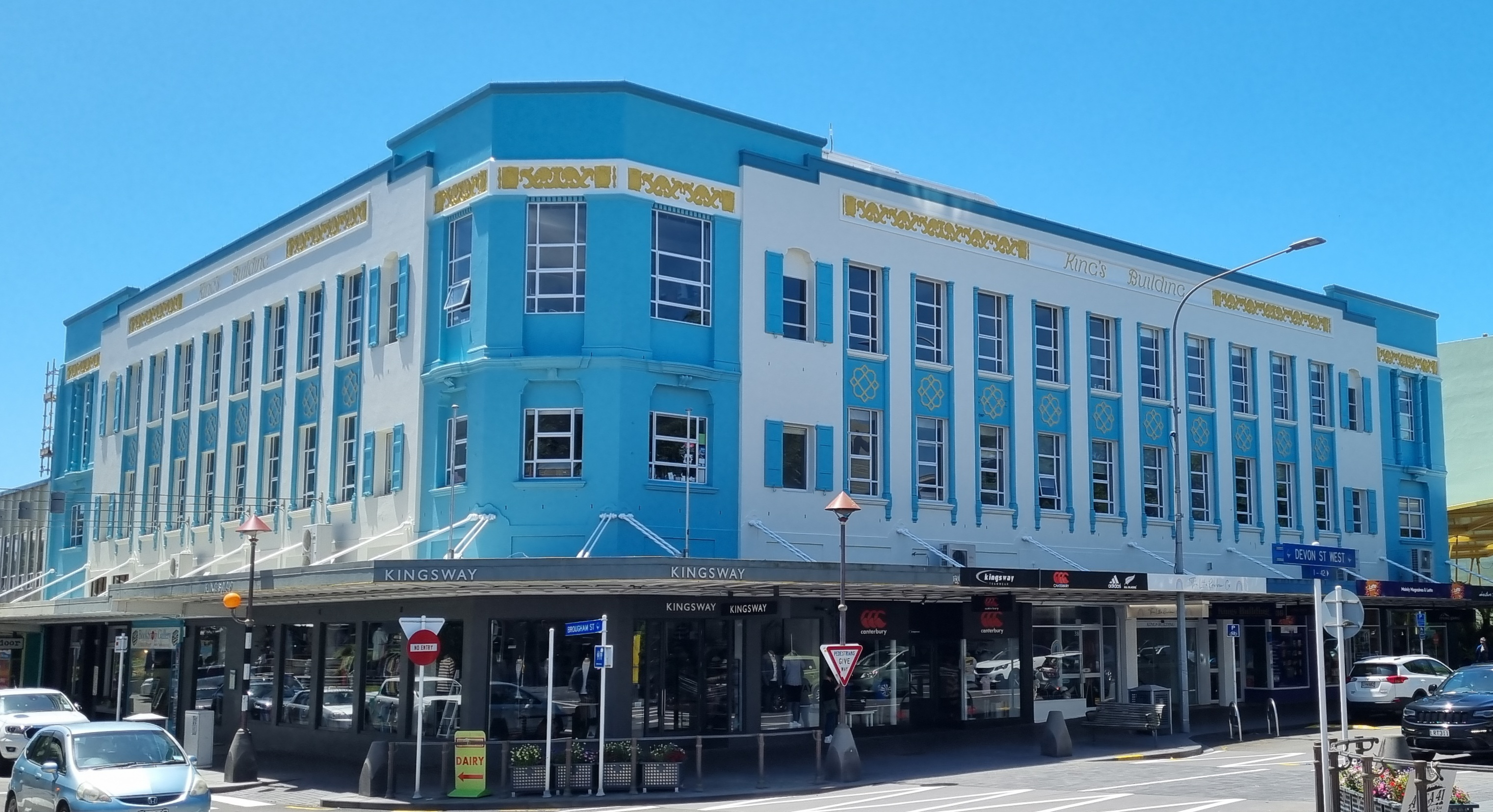
King Building, New Plymouth

Bates is also recognised for his domestic designs, particularly those in the California bungalow style, including his own two-storey home ("Bates House" in Pendarves Street, listed as a heritage place). His work is characterised by elegance and high-quality craftsmanship.

One of Bates’ best known works is the New Plymouth Opera House (now TSB Showplace), completed in 1924–1925 and acclaimed for its acoustics and elegant design.

His last work was the refurbishment of the Criterion Hotel on Devon Street West, New Plymouth (now demolished) for the visit of Queen Elizabeth II and Prince Philip, Duke of Edinburgh in January 1954.

Outside of architecture, Bates was deeply involved in cricket administration, serving as chairman of the Taranaki Provincial Committee and the New Zealand Cricket Association. He was also a fellow of the British Royal Society of Arts, a member of the Taranaki Jockey Club and a freemason.

Thomas Bates died on 13 March 1954 in a BOAC airliner crash at Kallang Airport while on the way to London.

== Image gallery ==
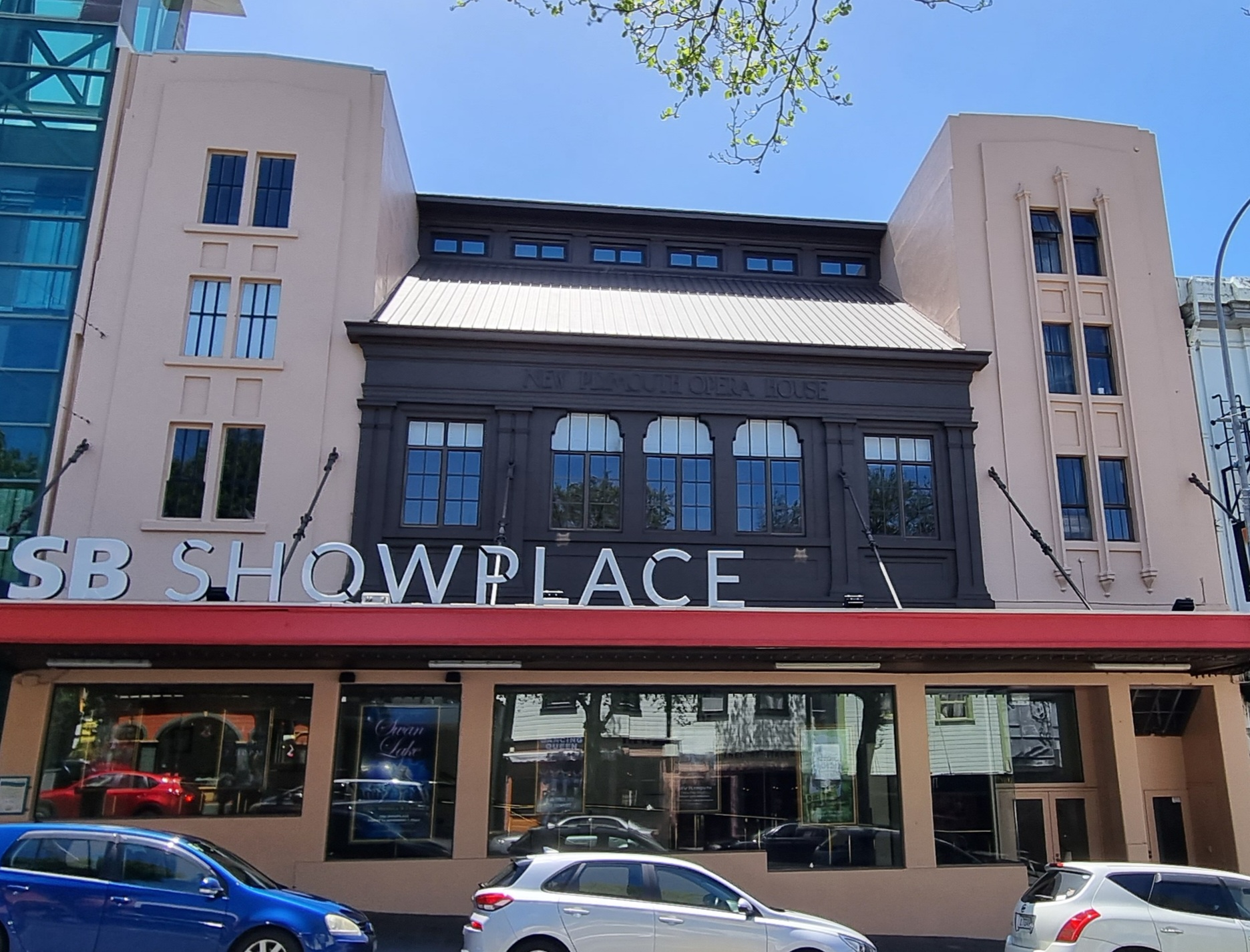
New Plymouth Opera House

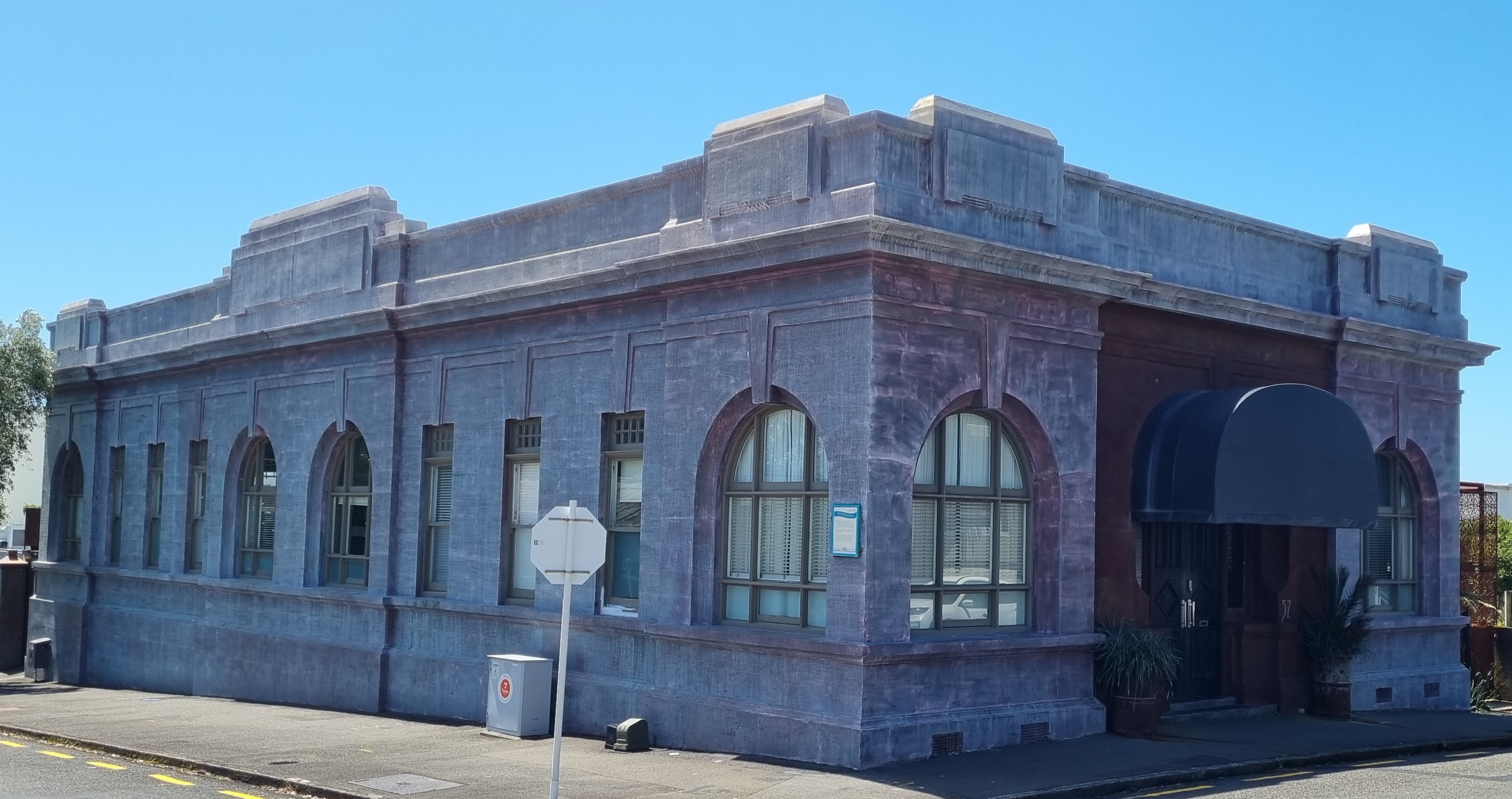
Public Trust Office (Former), New Plymouth

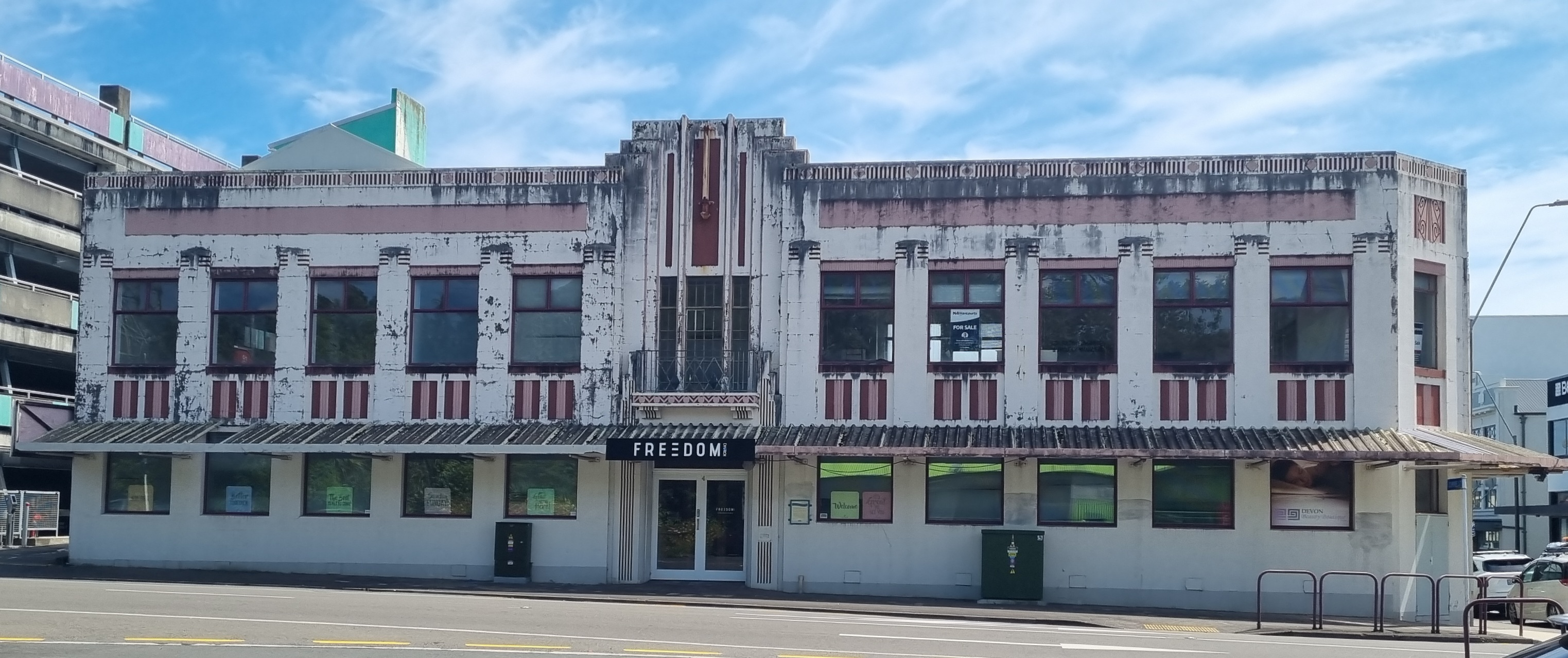
Roebuck House (former Taranaki Daily News)

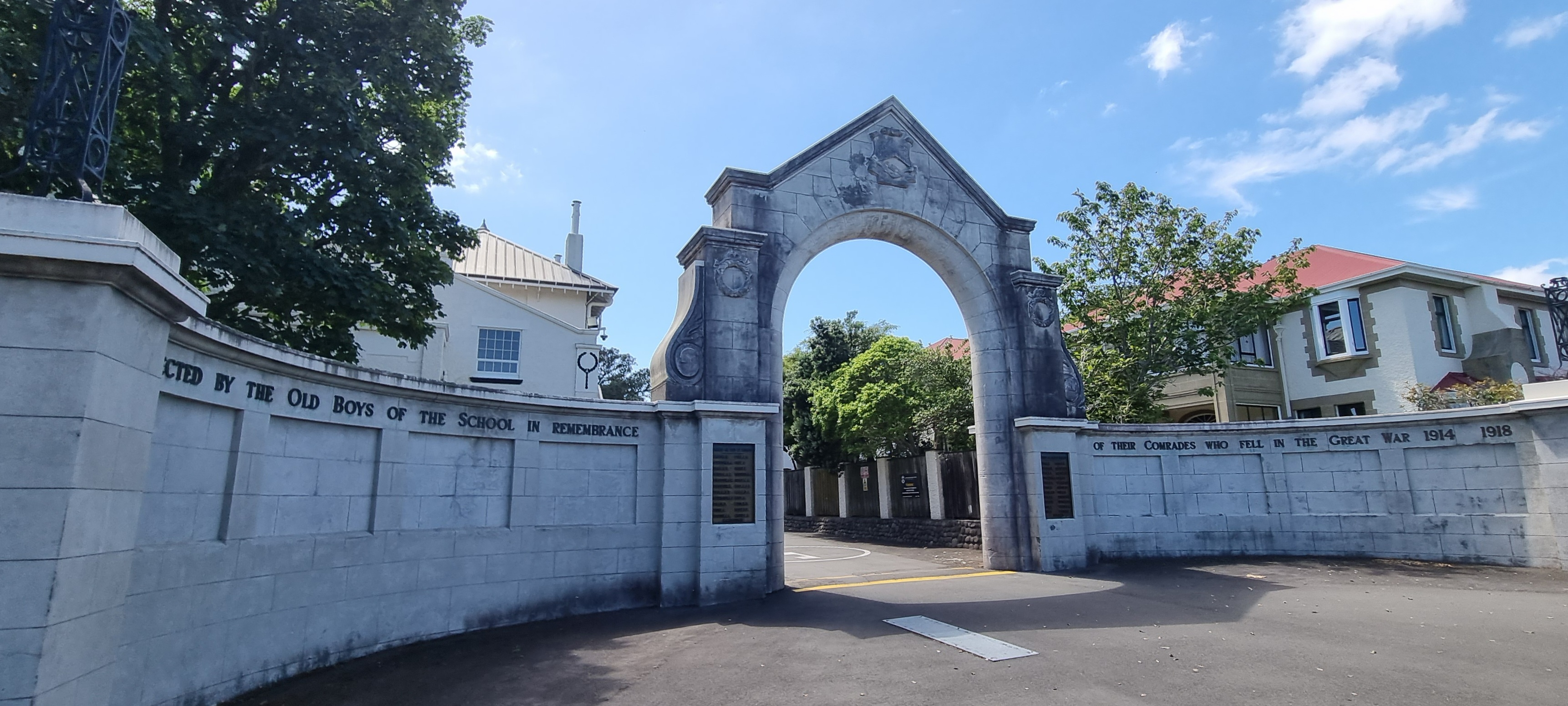
Memorial Gates at New Plymouth Boys' High School

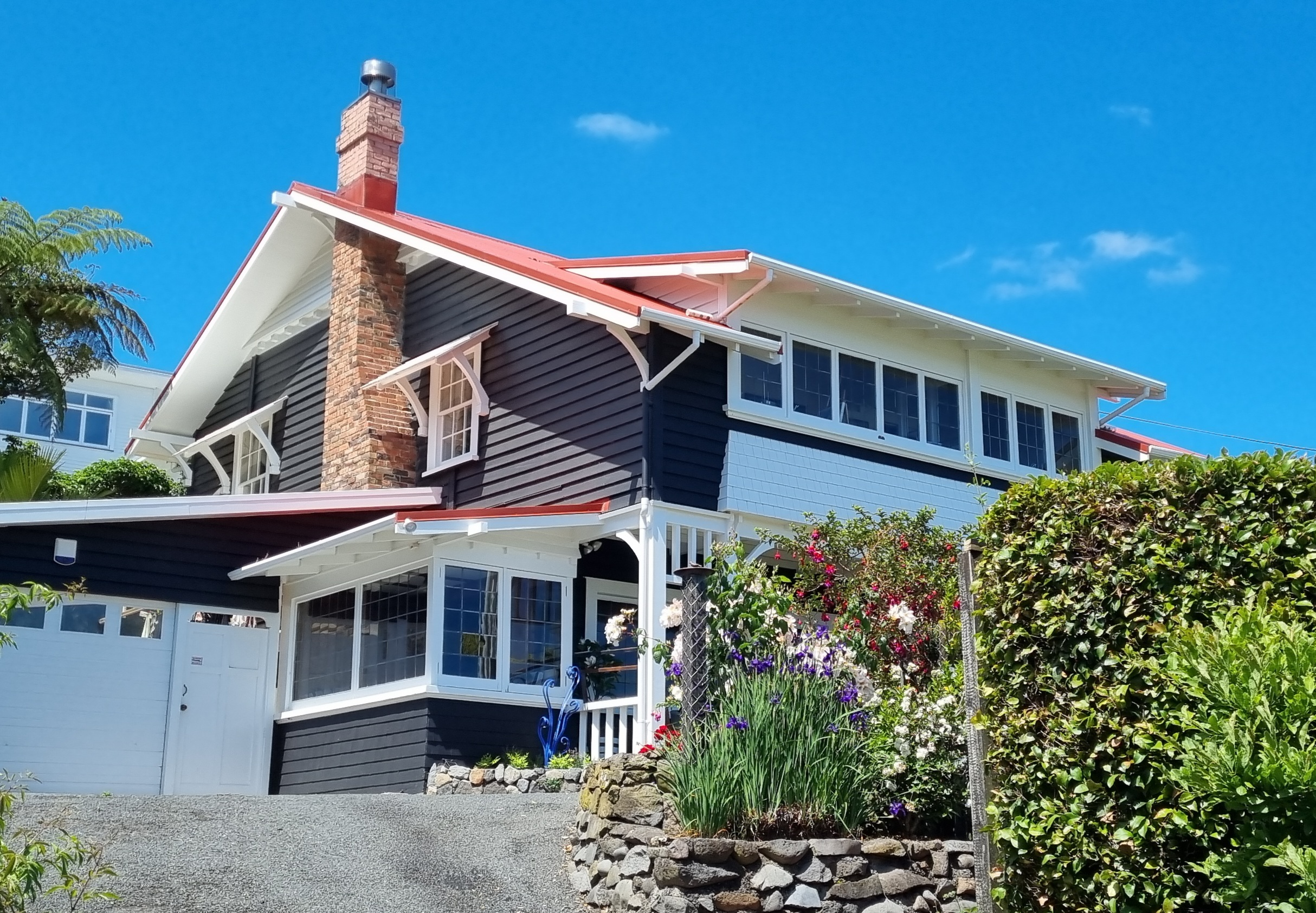
Bates House, New Plymouth

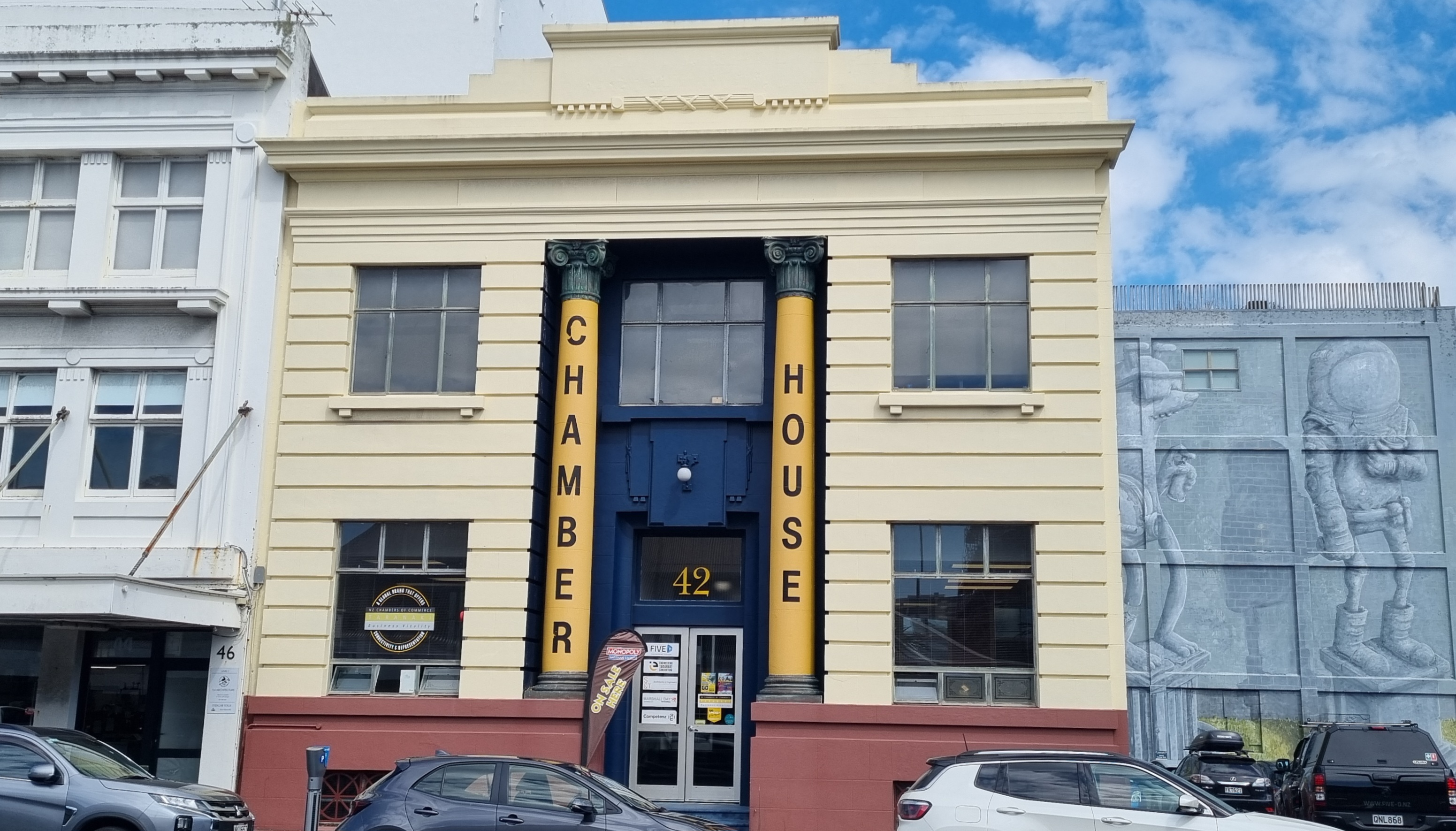
State Fire Insurance Building

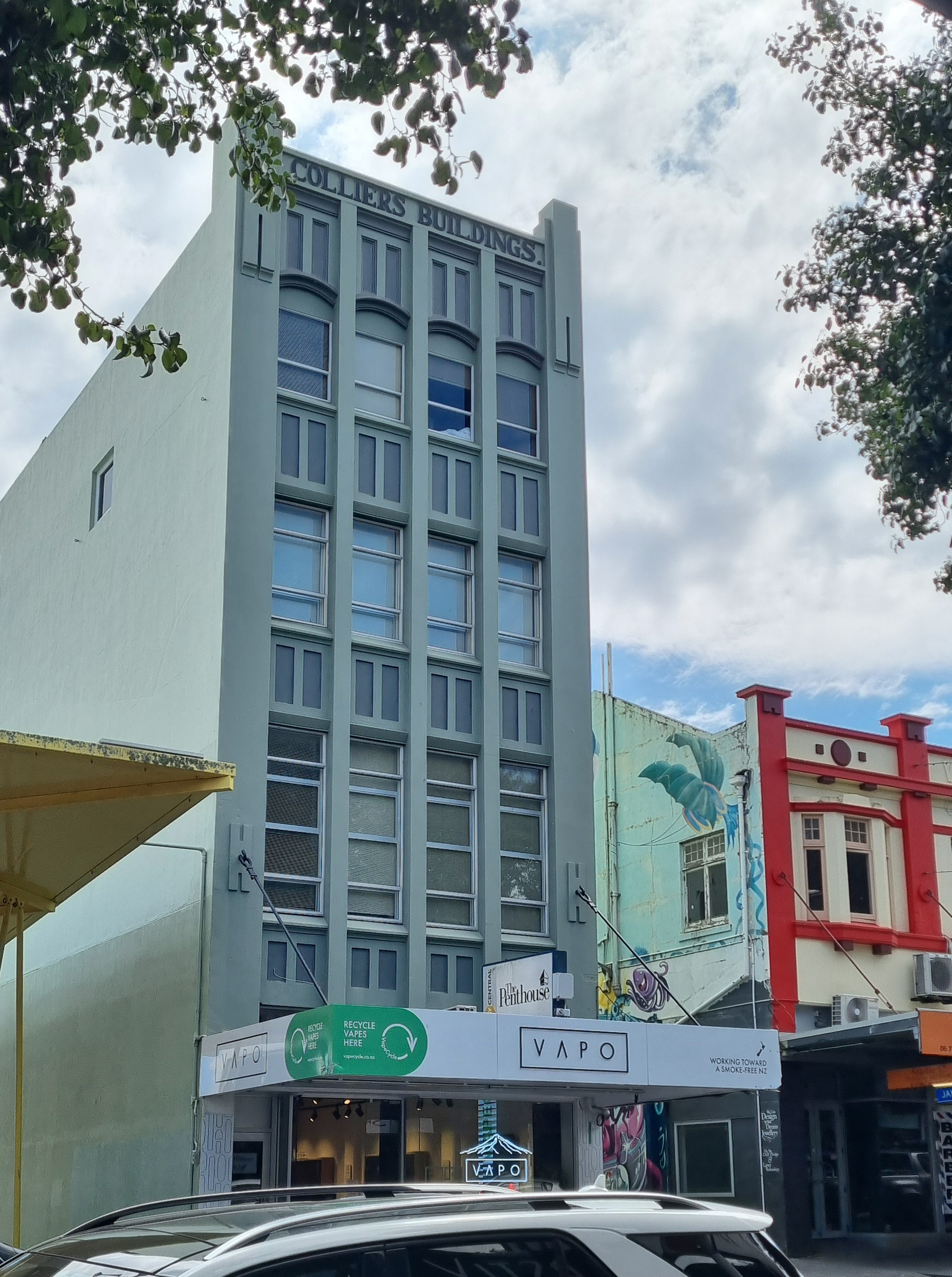
Colliers Building

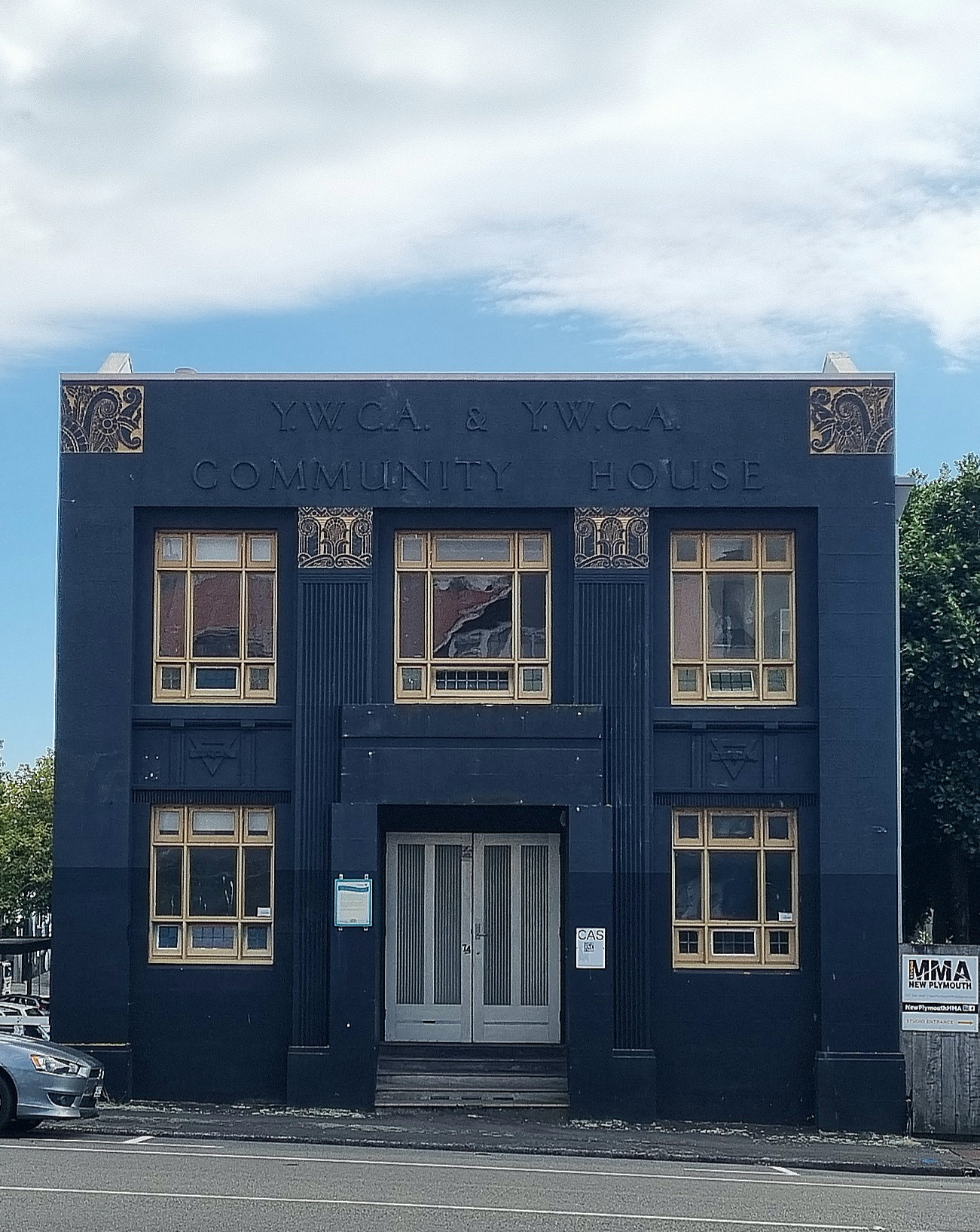
YWCA Hall

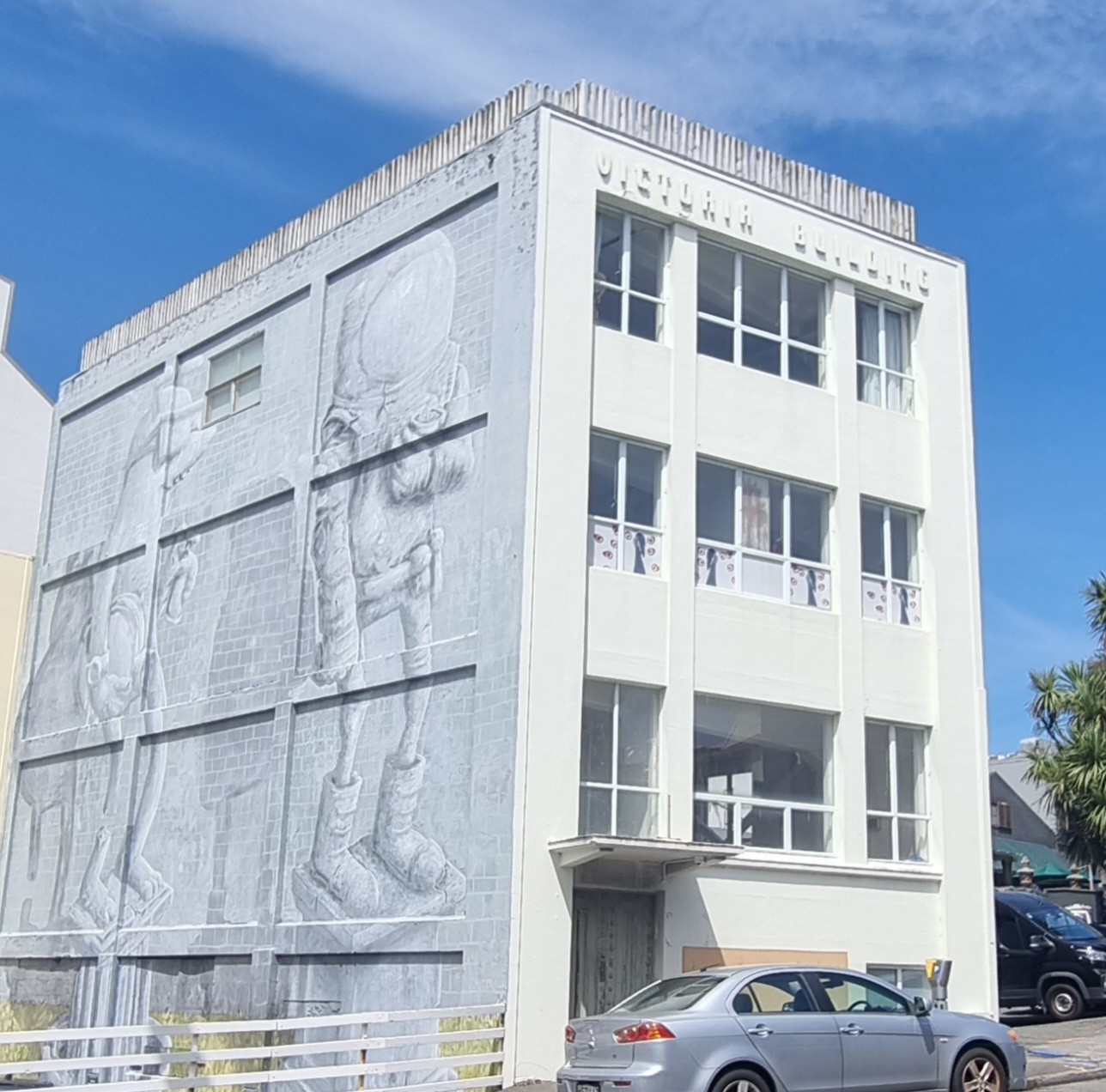
Victoria Building

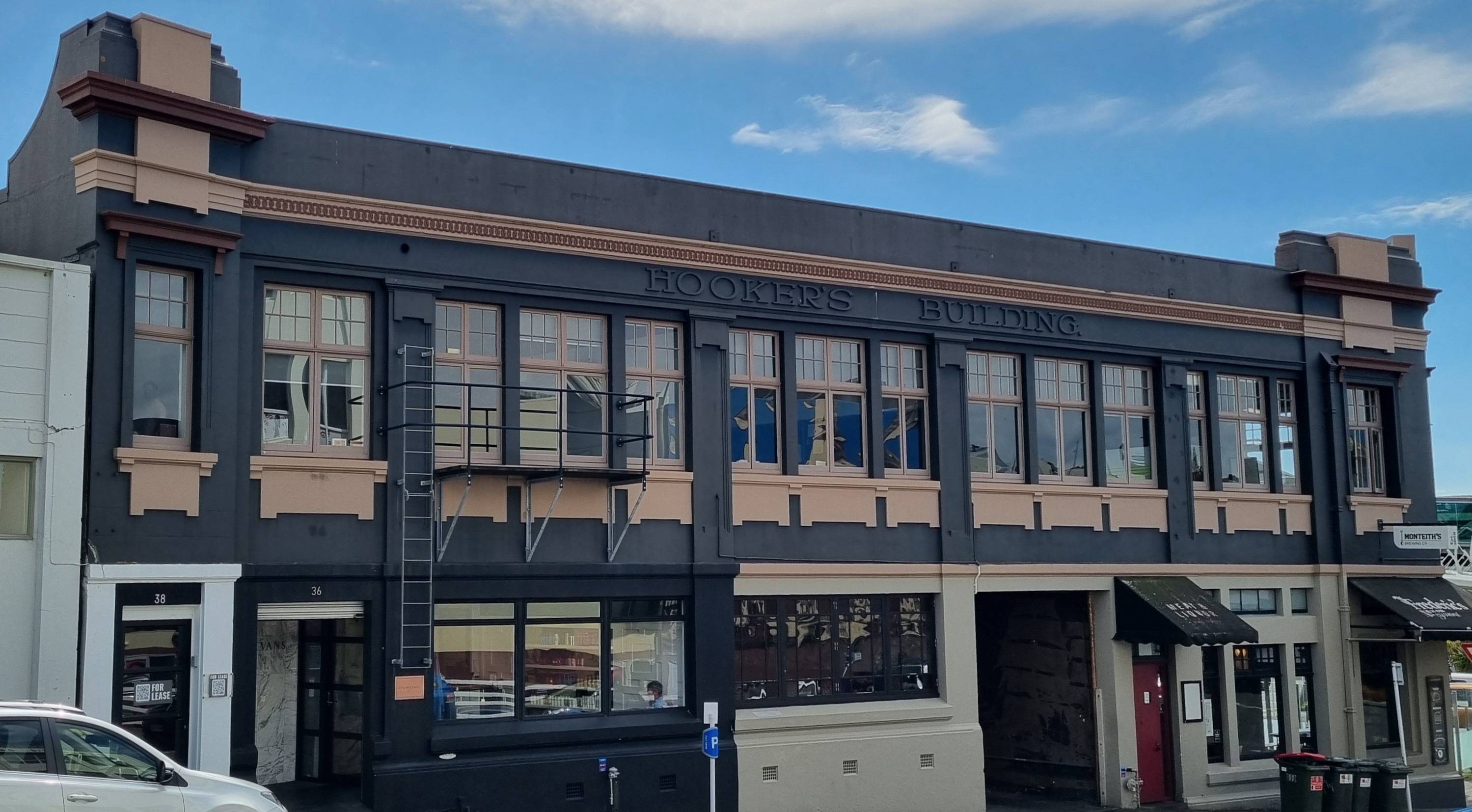
Hookers Building

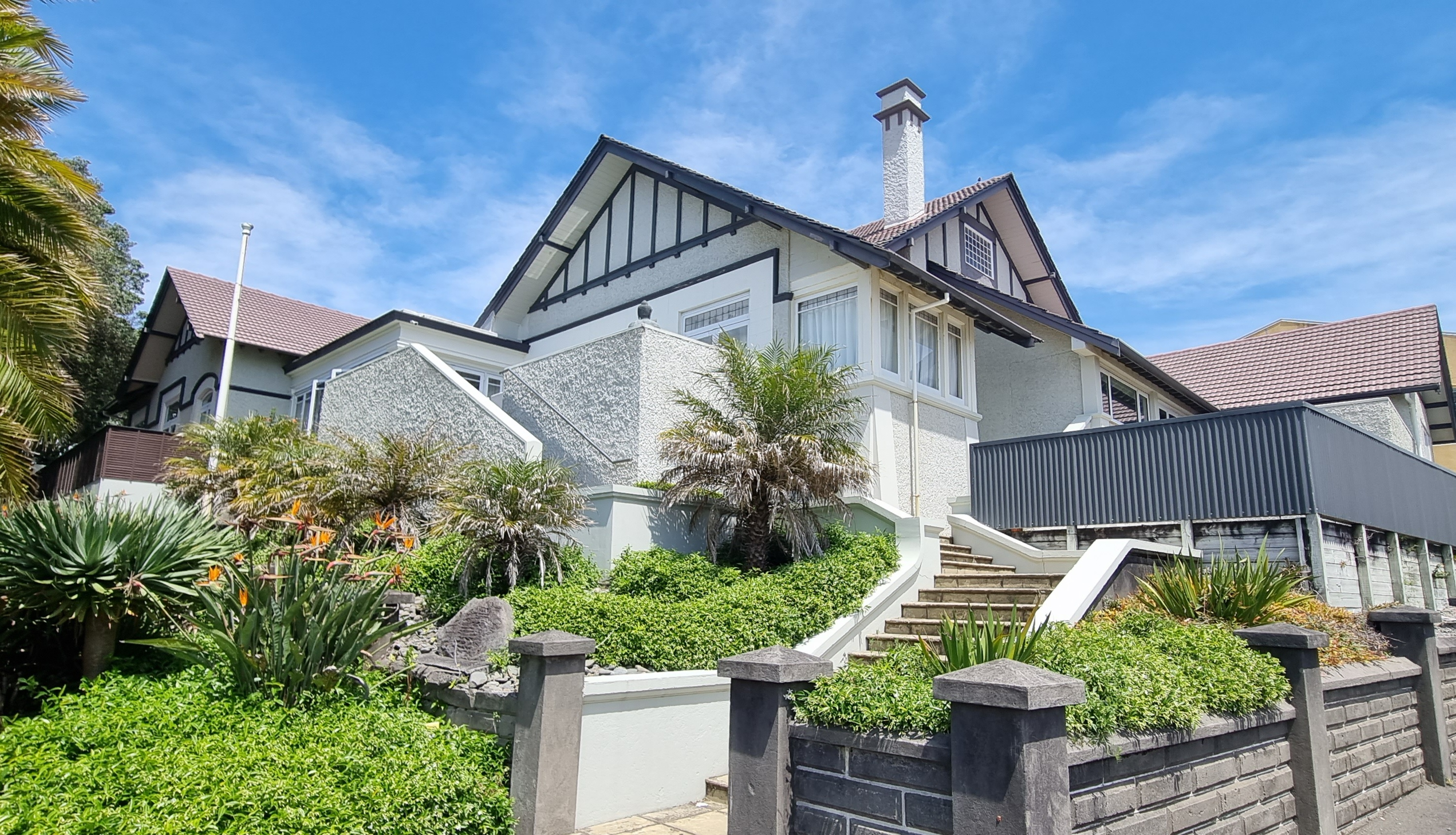
Taranaki Club Building

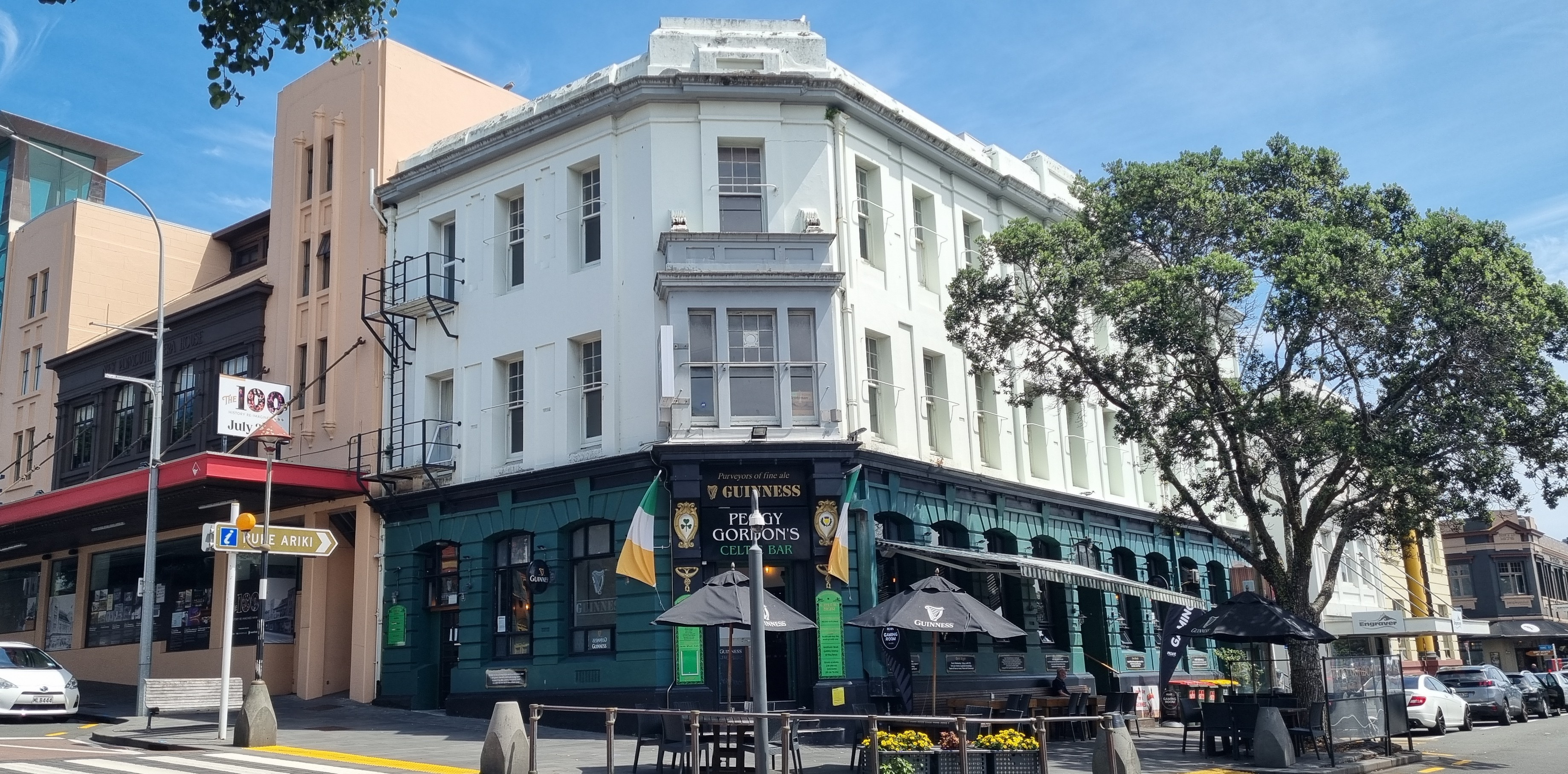
Former AMP Building
