= King's Building =

King's Building or King's Buildings may refer to:

- Chater House, an office tower in Hong Kong
- King Building, New Plymouth, a Category II listed building in New Plymouth, New Zealand
- King's Building, London, a Grade I listed building located in the Strand Campus of King's College London, England
- King's Buildings, a campus of the University of Edinburgh in Scotland
