= Roebuck House, New Plymouth =

Heritage building in New Plymouth, New Zealand

Roebuck House New Plymouth
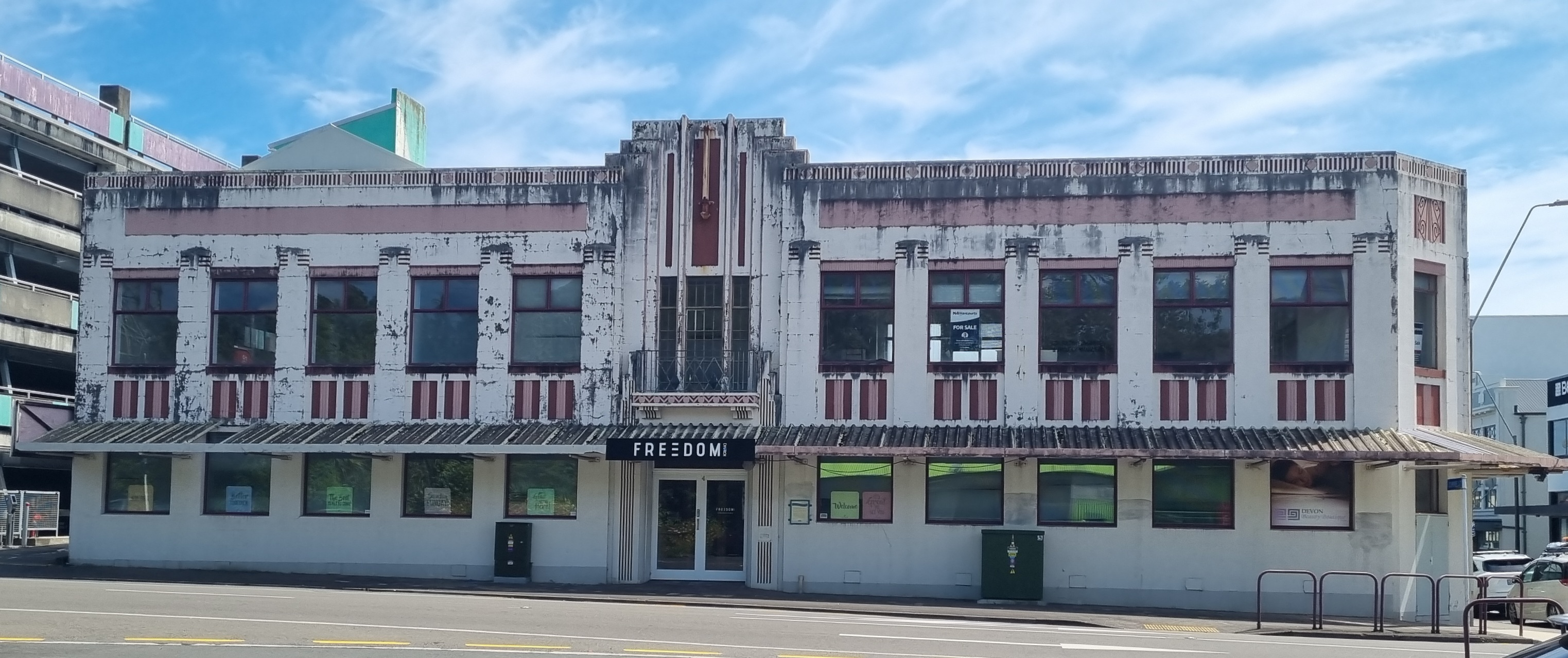
- Roebuck House
- Interactive map of the Roebuck House; New Plymouth area
- Former names: Taranaki Daily News

General information
- Architectural style: Stripped Classicism, Art Deco
- Location: 4-10 Powderham Street, New Plymouth Central, New Plymouth, New Zealand
- Coordinates: 39.058519°S 174.074336°E
- Construction started: 1937
- Completed: 1938

Design and construction
- Architect: Thomas Herbert Bates

Heritage New Zealand – Category 2
- Designated: 17 December 1993
- Reference no.: 7110

Roebuck House from New Plymouth, New Zealand, is a two-storey historic commercial building, originally built in 1937–1938 to house the offices and printing works of the Taranaki Daily News. Located on the corner of Powderham Street and Currie Street, it is recognized as a Category 2 historic place by Heritage New Zealand.

== History ==
The building, designed by New Plymouth architect Thomas Herbert Bates, was built between the years 1937 and 1939. It was originally raised on the corner of Powderham and Currie Streets to house the offices and printing works for the Taranaki Daily News newspaper. The Taranaki Daily News had moved into a building on the same corner site about 1901, so the new building designed by T. H. Bates incorporated some of the previous one.

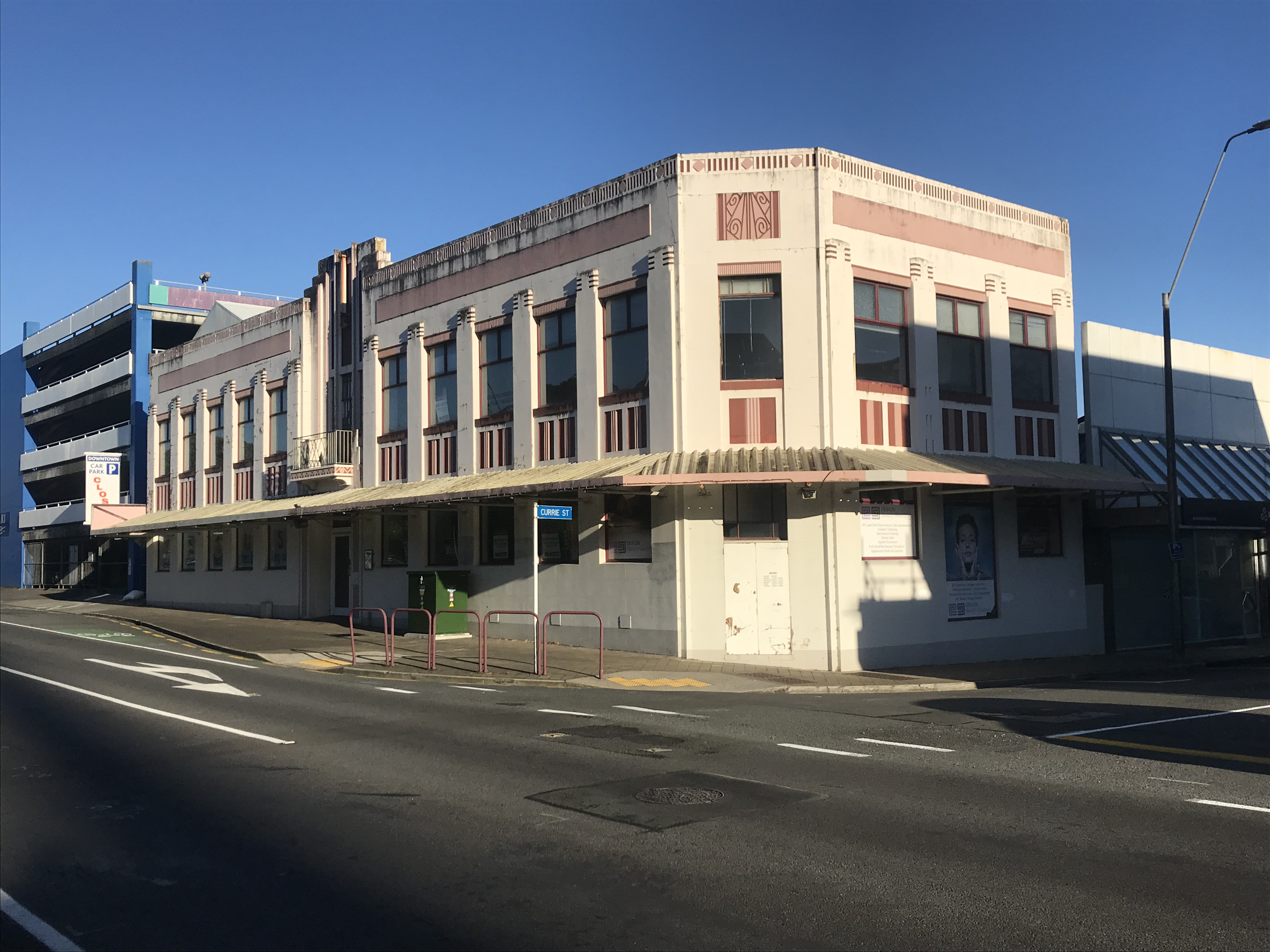
Roebuck House in 2021

The completion of the construction, at that time the second largest commercial structure in New Plymouth, was celebrated by the Taranaki Daily News with the publication of a supplement on the 31 March 1939 newspaper. The new building, designed for efficiency, convenience and aesthetics, featured modern design elements, including a skylight. It had a bright interior due to extensive glass use, and it was provided with a modern central heating system, an interphone system and a conveyor system that connected the press to the publishing room.

After Taranaki Daily News moved across the street, the building continued to be used as office space. It underwent renovations following fire damage in August 1990, with extensive works to modernize the interior, while preserving the exterior character.

== Description ==
Roebuck House is a two-storied reinforced concrete building on a steep site with heavy foundations, over 24 feet deep. It is recognized for its Stripped Classical and Art Deco architecture, specific for Thomas Herbert Bates’ style. The building features a distinctive red and white exterior with geometric motifs, fluted columns, modern aluminium joinery and a central balcony on the Powderham Street façade.
