= Clifford Knight =

British barrister and colonial judge (1909–1959)

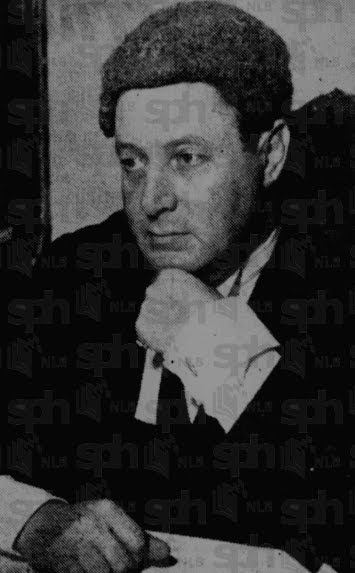
- Knight in 1954
- Born: 1 September 1909; Cape Town, South Africa
- Died: 23 July 1959 (aged 49); London
- Education: Bishops College
- Alma mater: Brasenose College, Oxford
- Occupations: Barrister and colonial judge
- Children: 2

Clifford Knight (1 September 1909 – 23 July 1959) was a British barrister and colonial judge.

== Early life and education ==
Knight was born on 1 September 1909 in Cape Town, South Africa, the son of Clifford Hume Knight and Edith Frances Knight, both British. He was educated at Bishops College, Cape Town and Brasenose College, Oxford. He was called to the Bar by the Inner Temple in 1932.

== Career ==
Knight joined the Colonial Legal Service in 1933. He served as a magistrate in Tanganyika from 1935 to 1940 when he went to serve in the East African Forces until 1944. He then served with other units, rose to the rank of major and sat on military courts in Abyssinia and Italian Somaliland. After demobilisation, he served as a judge in Nyasaland (1947–48), and Tanganyika (1948–1951).

Knight went to Singapore in 1951, and served as a Senior Puisne Judge in the High Court and Court of Appeal. While in office, he sat as president of the court of enquiry investigating the BOAC Lockheed Constellation Crash at Kallang Airport in 1954 in which 33 passengers and crew were killed, and criticised the "sorry state" of the airport's fire services.

In 1955, he sat as president of the board of inquiry considering a $5 million claim against the Crown by three subsidiaries of Shell Oil Co and Standard Vacuum Oil Co who claimed compensation for oil taken by British armed forces from the Japanese on the liberation of Singapore in 1945. In dismissing the claim, Knight stated that it was "utterly misconceived either in common sense or equity".

On his retirement in 1958 under the policy of Malayanisation, John Whyatt, Chief Justice of Singapore, said that Knight "would be especially remembered for the part he played in the administration of justice on the criminal side, where he had a earned a reputation for disposing of cases expeditiously, firmly and fairly".

== Personal life and death ==
Knight married Pauline Bruce Steel in 1932 and they had a son and a daughter. While in Singapore, he was chairman of the Council of St John, president of the RSPCA and president of the Tanglin Club.

Knight died on 23 July 1959 in London, aged 49.
