= Mayfair Cinema, New Plymouth =

Heritage building in New Plymouth, New Zealand

Mayfair Cinema
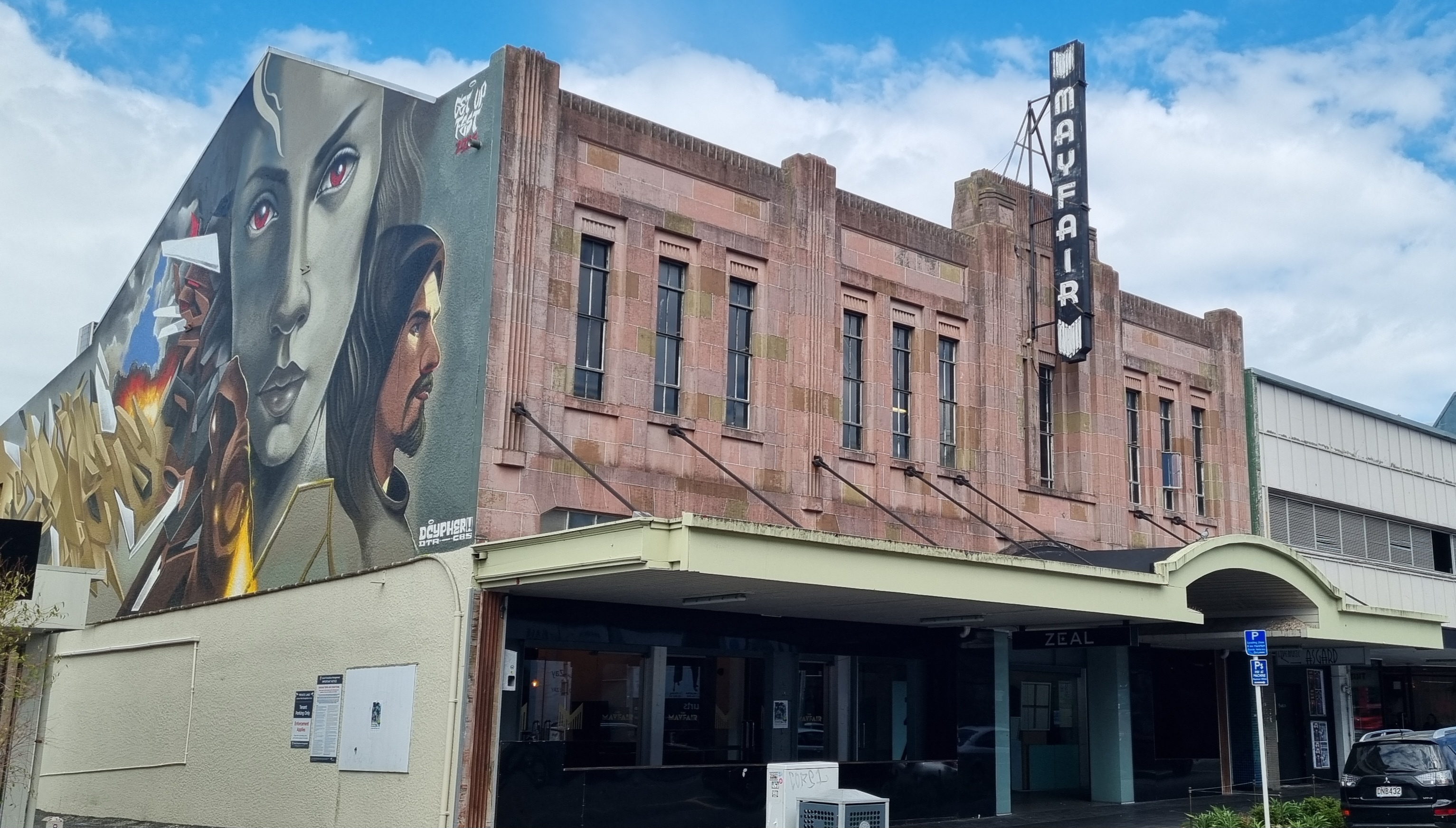
- Interactive map of the Mayfair Cinema area

General information
- Architectural style: Art Deco
- Location: 69 Devon Street West, New Plymouth, New Zealand
- Coordinates: 39°03′31″S 174°04′21″E
- Construction started: 1916
- Completed: 1916
- Inaugurated: 14 December 1916
- Renovated: 1937–1938

Design and construction
- Architects: Hugh Cresswell Grierson; Kenneth Walter Aimer; Thomas Herbert Bates
- Architecture firm: Grierson and Aimer

Heritage New Zealand – Category 2
- Designated: 1 September 1983
- Reference no.: 898

Mayfair Cinema, also known as The Mayfair, in New Plymouth, New Zealand, is a Category 2 historic landmark, registered by Heritage New Zealand. Originally opened as a cinema, the restored heritage building, located at 69–73 Devon Street West in central New Plymouth, is now primarily used as a live music and community arts space. It is one of the few surviving Art Deco cinema buildings in the region, featuring original plasterwork, wood banisters, and a striking 1930s façade.

== History ==
In 1916, the New Plymouth company Taranaki Amusements Ltd commissioned the Everybody's Theatre Auditorium in Devon Street West. It was designed by the Auckland architects Hugh C. Grierson and Kenneth W. Aimer and built by Sydney Chappell & Woolley contractors, for an estimated cost of £5,283. The construction of the theatre was supervised by Thomas Herbert Bates, an architect newly arrived in town. The first screening in the new theatre was on 15 December 1916.

The new theatre was described as “one of the finest picture theatres in New Zealand” at the time. The Grecian-inspired interior features Ionic columns and a grand elliptical dome, giving the whole space a sense of grandeur. The seats were wide, the air moved freely through hidden lattices, and the lighting glowed softly from concealed fittings. Safety, too, was built into every corner: ferro‑concrete walls, multiple exits, and the projection box set apart from the crowd.

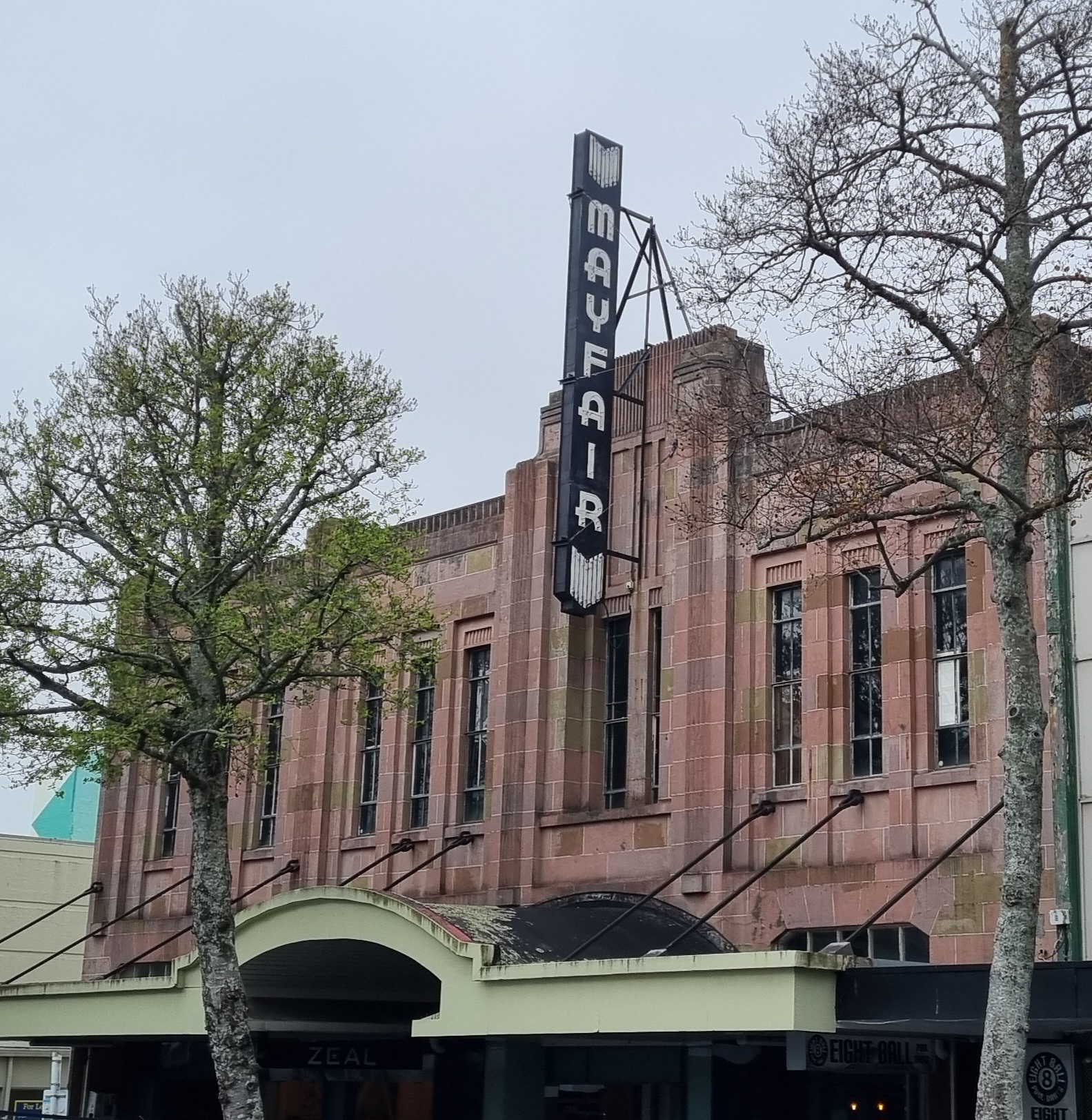
Mayfair Cinema façade

In 1937, Boon Bros. had won the contract with an estimated cost of £10,300 for a major upgrade of the Everybody's Theatre, considered one of the biggest building jobs in New Plymouth at the time. Designed by architect Thomas H. Bates, the new façade and entrance foyer to the theatre, successfully matched the Art Deco decorations of the new design with the former traditional Art Nouveau theatre interior. It also had a tower‑like feature carrying a new neon sign. The theatre reopened on 29 July 1938 under the new name of Mayfair Theatre.

Between 1953 and 1984 there were several alterations and upgrades to the shops on the ground floor. In 2012, the Mayfair Cinema had to close for major earthquake strengthening works, in order to preserve its architectural integrity, while making it suitable for modern use. The development won a national award from the New Zealand Society for Earthquake Engineering.

After the refurbishment, Mayfair was primarily used as a live music and community arts space. It was positioned as a social hub, a place for drinks, dining, dancing, and events, with a function room that supported everything from comedy nights to community balls. In August 2020, it became a youth space run by the youth organisation Zeal.

== Description ==
Mayfair Cinema is a two-storied reinforced concrete Art Deco building with geometric motifs decorating the window heads and parapet. It contains shops on the ground floor and hall above. The theatre's main entry is deliberately set off‑centre, framed by an elegant arch, crowned by a cluster of tall, fluted columns, and wrapped in the confident ornamentation of the Art Deco tradition.

The theatre's traditional Art Nouveau Grecian-inspired interior had white plaster, Ionic columns, and a great elliptical dome that lifted the whole space with a sense of grandeur.
