= 1954 BOAC Lockheed Constellation crash =

Deadliest Plane crash in Singapore

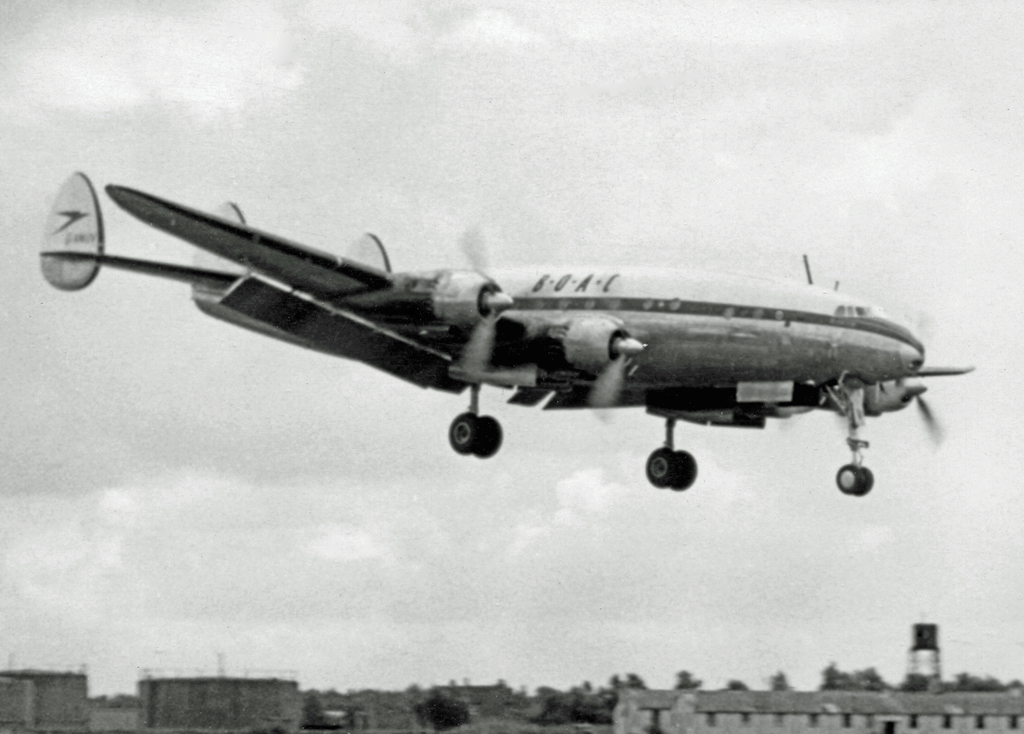
- A BOAC Lockheed L-749A Constellation, similar to the aircraft involved

Accident
- Date: 13 March 1954
- Summary: Pilot error
- Site: Kallang Airport, Singapore; 01°18′26.68″N 103°52′24.16″E

Aircraft
- Aircraft type: Lockheed L-749A Constellation
- Aircraft name: Belfast
- Operator: British Overseas Airways Corporation
- Registration: G-ALAM
- Flight origin: Sydney, Australia
- 1st stopover: Darwin, Australia
- 2nd stopover: Jakarta, Indonesia
- 3rd stopover: Kallang, Singapore
- Destination: London, United Kingdom
- Occupants: 40
- Passengers: 31
- Crew: 9
- Fatalities: 33
- Injuries: 7
- Survivors: 7

A British Overseas Airways Corporation (BOAC) Lockheed L-749A Constellation crashed and caught fire as it attempted to land at Kallang Airport on 13 March 1954, killing 33 of the 40 passengers and crew. The accident occurred when the aircraft struck a seawall on approach to the runway. The inquiry attributed this to crew tiredness, noting that the captain had been on duty for over 21 hours. It also criticised the response of the airport fire unit. This is the highest death toll of any aviation accident in Singapore.

== Flight ==
The aircraft was operating a joint Qantas–BOAC scheduled passenger flight from Sydney, Australia, to London, England. Following a stopover at Jakarta, Indonesia, it crashed while landing at Kallang Airport. Captain Trevor Hoyle was the pilot. The aircraft was a Lockheed L-749A Constellation, a low-wing monoplane airliner with four Wright R-3350 Duplex-Cyclone radial engines. It had first flown in the United States in 1947. Originally part of an order by Eastern Air Lines it was re-allocated to the Irish airline Aerlínte Éireann and delivered on 16 September 1947. It was sold in 1948 by Aerlínte Éireann, along with five other Constellations, to British Overseas Airways Corporation. It had been registered as G-ALAM and named Belfast.

== Accident ==
The accident occurred when the aircraft struck a seawall on approach to Runway 06 at Kallang, damaging the undercarriage and causing a leak from the number three wing fuel tank. As the aircraft touched down a second time, on the runway, the undercarriage collapsed and the aircraft slid until the starboard wing broke off. The remainder of the aircraft rolled to the right, coming to rest upside down with the fuselage in two pieces, and one of the engines carried on for another 100 yd (91 m). The aircraft was already on fire when it came to rest. The weather was clear at 2:35 p.m. when the accident occurred.

Five crew members escaped from the cockpit through a 14-by-10-inch clear vision panel, and two more through a gash in the fuselage in the crew compartment, the sole survivors of the accident. Holes were cut in the fuselage through which a stewardess and two passengers were removed, but the latter died before reaching a hospital, and the stewardess died later of her injuries. No attempt was made to use the emergency exits, and the main cabin door was jammed; at the inquiry a fire expert attached to the RAF stated that the door of the Constellation was the most difficult he had had to open in his 24-year firefighting career.

All 31 passengers died, along with 2 crew members (the other crew fatality being a steward). It is the highest death toll of any aviation accident ever to take place in Singapore. Among the victims was Ami Chandra, a noted Fijian educator and president of the Fiji Industrial Workers Congress, Professor Francis Cecil Chalkin, Dean of the Science Faculty at the University of Canterbury, Professor Robert Orr McGechan, Dean of the Law Faculty at Victoria University of Wellington and architect Thomas Herbert Bates from New Plymouth.

== Public inquiry ==
The colonial government held a public inquiry into the accident under Justice Knight from 31 May to 16 August. The accident was attributed to poor execution of the approach due to crew tiredness, which exacerbated the pilot's decision to touch down near the end of the runway. The inquiry determined that, at the time of arrival in Singapore, Captain Hoyle had been on duty for 21½ hours since the flight departed Sydney.

Christopher Shawcross, senior counsel for BOAC, stated that "the crash would not have happened had it not been for the condition which existed at that end of the runway on the day of the crash", referring to the wall struck by the plane.

The inquiry criticised the airport fire unit's lack of equipment and the efforts it made to rescue the passengers in the six- to eight-minute period after the aircraft came to rest, when many were probably still alive. It did not censure the aircraft crew but did not commend their actions either, noting they were suffering from shock and the darkness and fumes.

After studying the public report on the crash, the Singapore coroner recorded verdicts of 'death by misadventure'. The coroner also said that Captain Hoyle had made an error of judgement but that no one was criminally responsible for the crash.

== Aftermath ==
Twenty-four of the victims, including fourteen who were not identified, were buried together in a communal grave at Bidadari Cemetery. Two crash victims were mistaken for one another and received funeral rites of the other's religion.

BOAC based four captains in Sydney so the Sydney–Darwin and Darwin–Jakarta routes could be flown by separate captains.
