= Public Trust Office (Former), New Plymouth =

Heritage building in New Plymouth, New Zealand

Public Trust Office (Former) New Plymouth
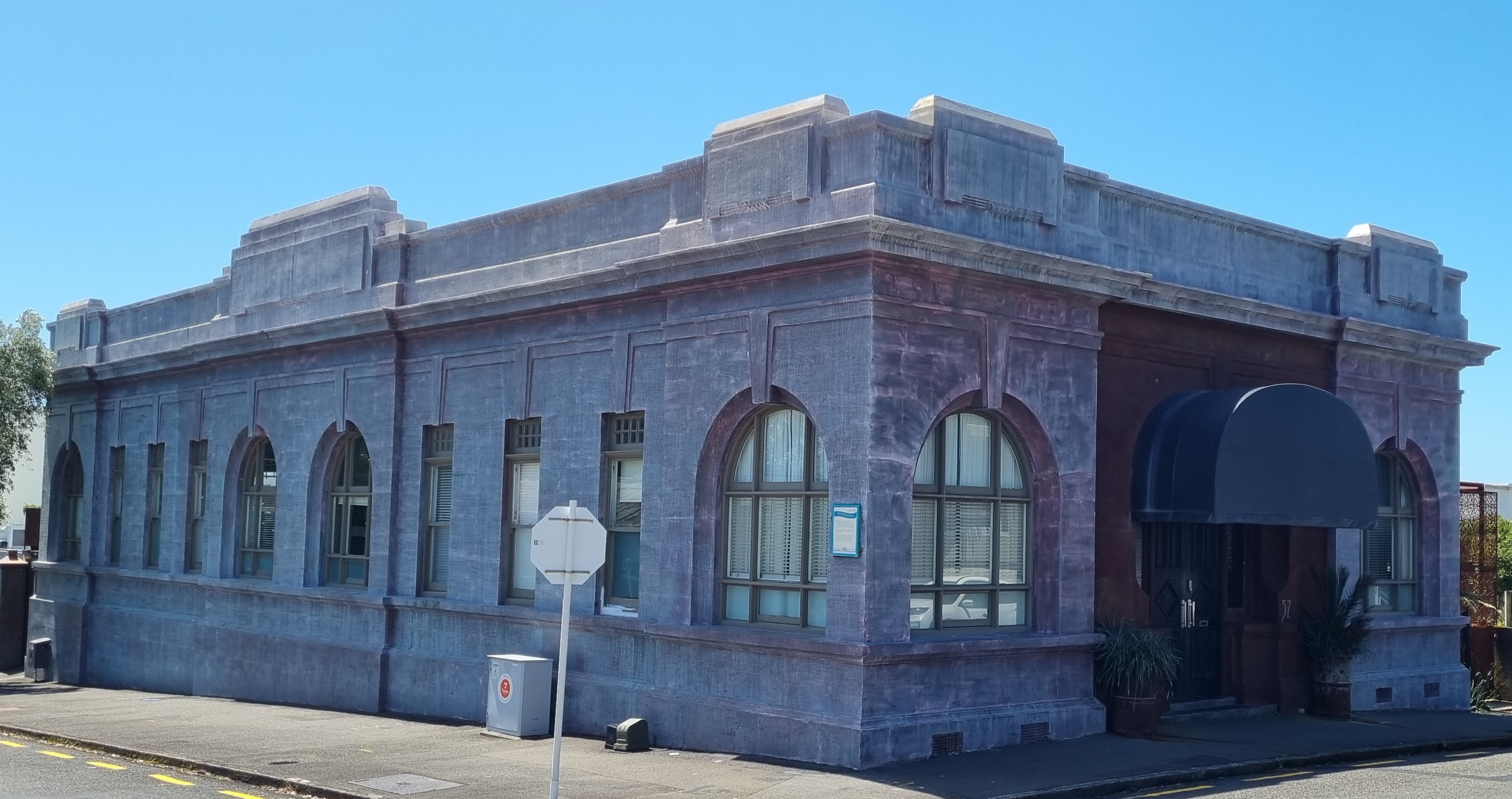
- Public Trust Office (Former)
- Interactive map of the Public Trust Office (Former); New Plymouth area

General information
- Location: 52 King Street and 29 Queen Street, New Plymouth, New Zealand
- Coordinates: 39.0558062°S 174.070191°E
- Construction started: 1920
- Completed: 1925

Design and construction
- Architect: Thomas Herbert Bates

Heritage New Zealand – Category 2
- Designated: 14 July 1995
- Reference no.: 7237

Public Trust Office (Former) from New Plymouth, New Zealand, one of the buildings designed by the local architect Thomas Herbert Bates, is now a Category 2 heritage structure registered by Heritage New Zealand. It is remarkable for its "no-nonsense" provincial office character and its contribution to the town centre's heritage landscape.

== History ==
New Zealand’s Public Trust Act from 1872 created the world’s first government-owned trustee service, with the purpose of administering public and private estates. During the 1920’s decentralisation, new office buildings were built throughout the country, and New Plymouth office was one of them.

It was designed by the local architect Thomas Herbert Bates and it is one of the many buildings he built in the town centre. The Public Trust office was raised between 1920-1921 by Roberts and Son Contractors, for an estimated cost of about £4,000. The building was extended in 1925 along the Queen Street boundary, doubling its building floor area.

The building was vacated by the Public Trust in 1982 and the following year it underwent interior changes to accommodate commercial offices. In 1995 the building was sold by the Public Trust, and after facing demolition, it was decided for it to retain the historic façade and convert the building for residential use. Sold in 2007, it was transformed in 2008 into a high-end private residence and luxury accommodation, known as Ashby Folville. The conversion retained the original façade and several historic elements, including the original urinals, and added modern luxurious features, like new kitchens, a private deck, a media room, a small gymnasium and a sauna.

== Description ==
Although it is simple in form and design, the former Public Trust Office building is a remarkable example of Stripped Beaux-Arts (Note: Stripped Beaux-Arts, often referred to as a key component of Stripped Classicism or a transitional phase toward Art Deco, refers to an architectural style popular in the inter-war period (roughly the 1920s and 1930s) that retained the monumental, symmetrical, and classical principles of the Beaux-Arts tradition but eliminated its ornate, decorative and opulent elements.) classical design, a style chosen to project an image of solidity and reliability for the Public Trust's regional expansion.

The compact and solid single-storey building is reinforced concrete, plastered with timber joinery, and at first sight modest in size and appearance. The main entrance on King Street features a curved canopy flanked by two segmented semicircular windows with elongated keystones. The Queen Street façade has a pattern of round and square-headed windows, with abstracted stepped motifs on the parapet at each corner and the middle of the façade. The design elements, like the abstracted stepped motifs at each corner and in the middle of the Queen St façade, are characteristic of architect Thomas H. Bates’ style.

The building was described by Sir Michael Fowler as evoking comfort and confidence to its clients through its “no-nonsense frontage and the inspired and confident lettering” on the main façade.

== Image gallery ==
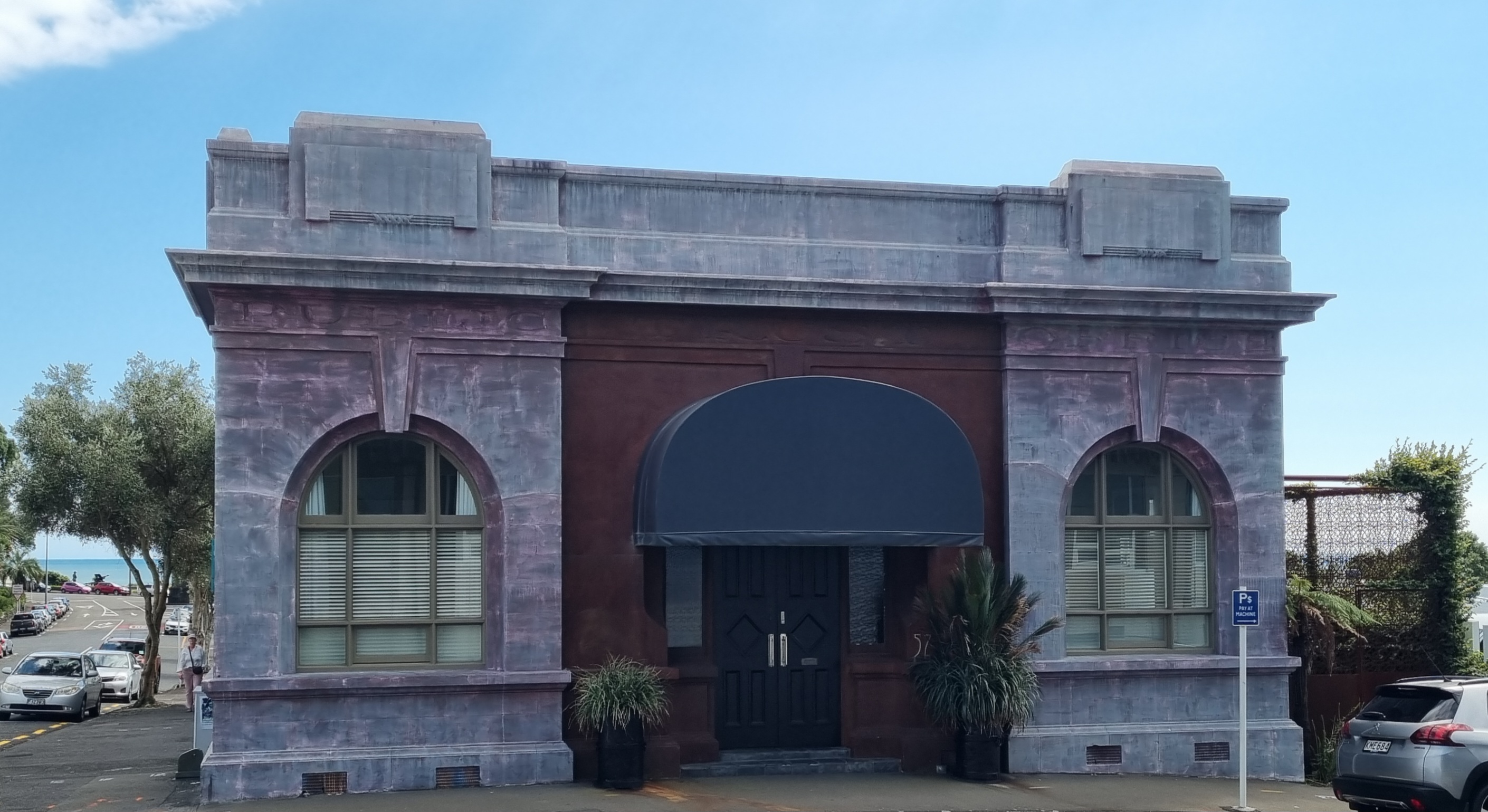
Main entrance on King Street

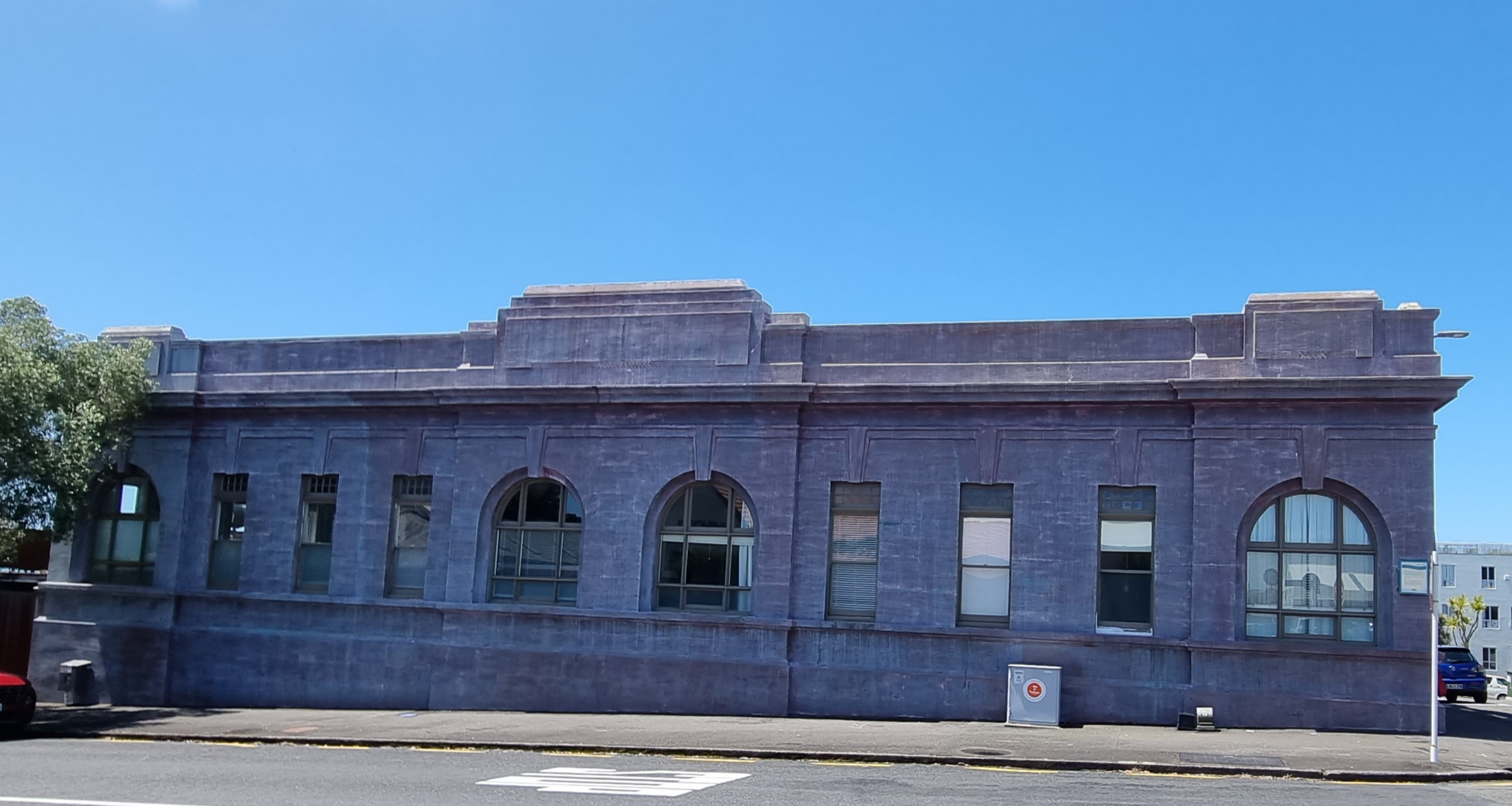
Queen Street façade

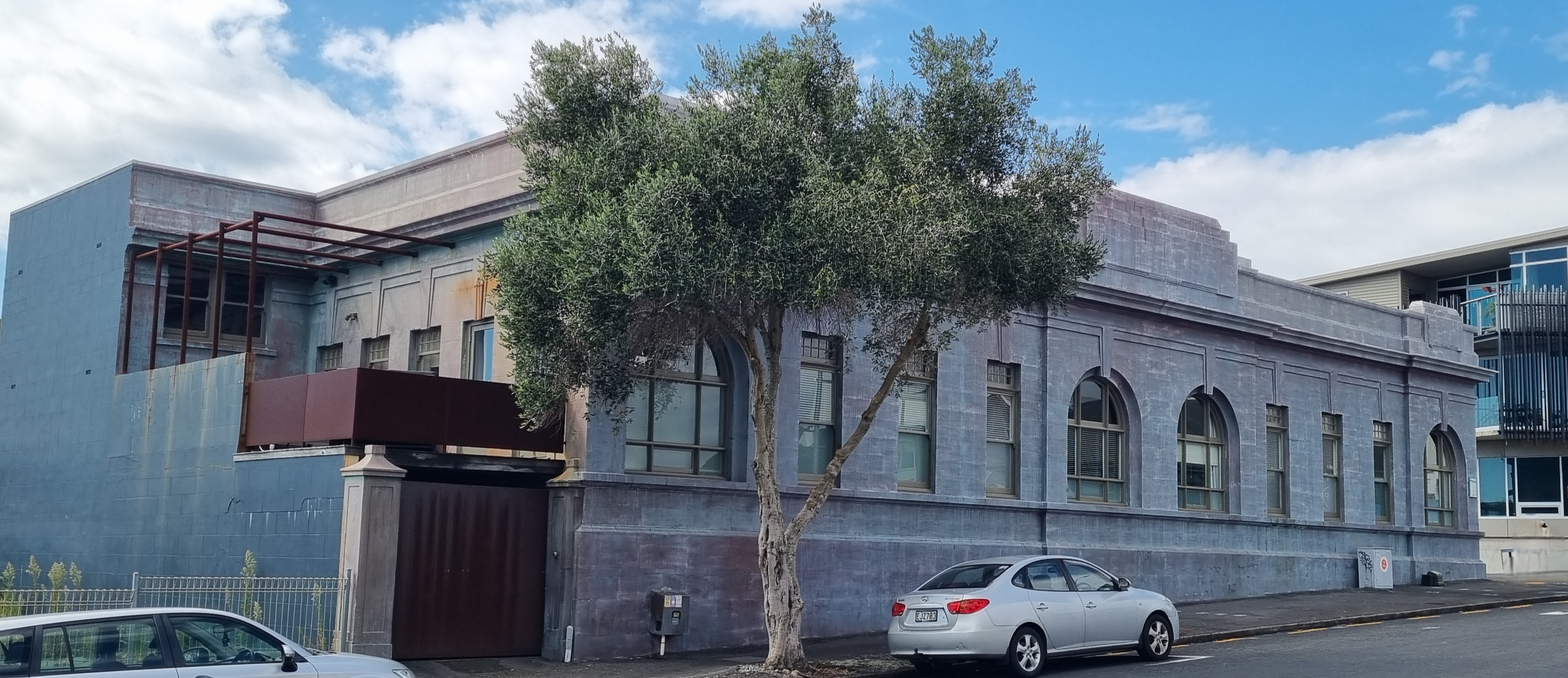
South-West side
