= New Plymouth Opera House =

Heritage building in New Plymouth, New Zealand

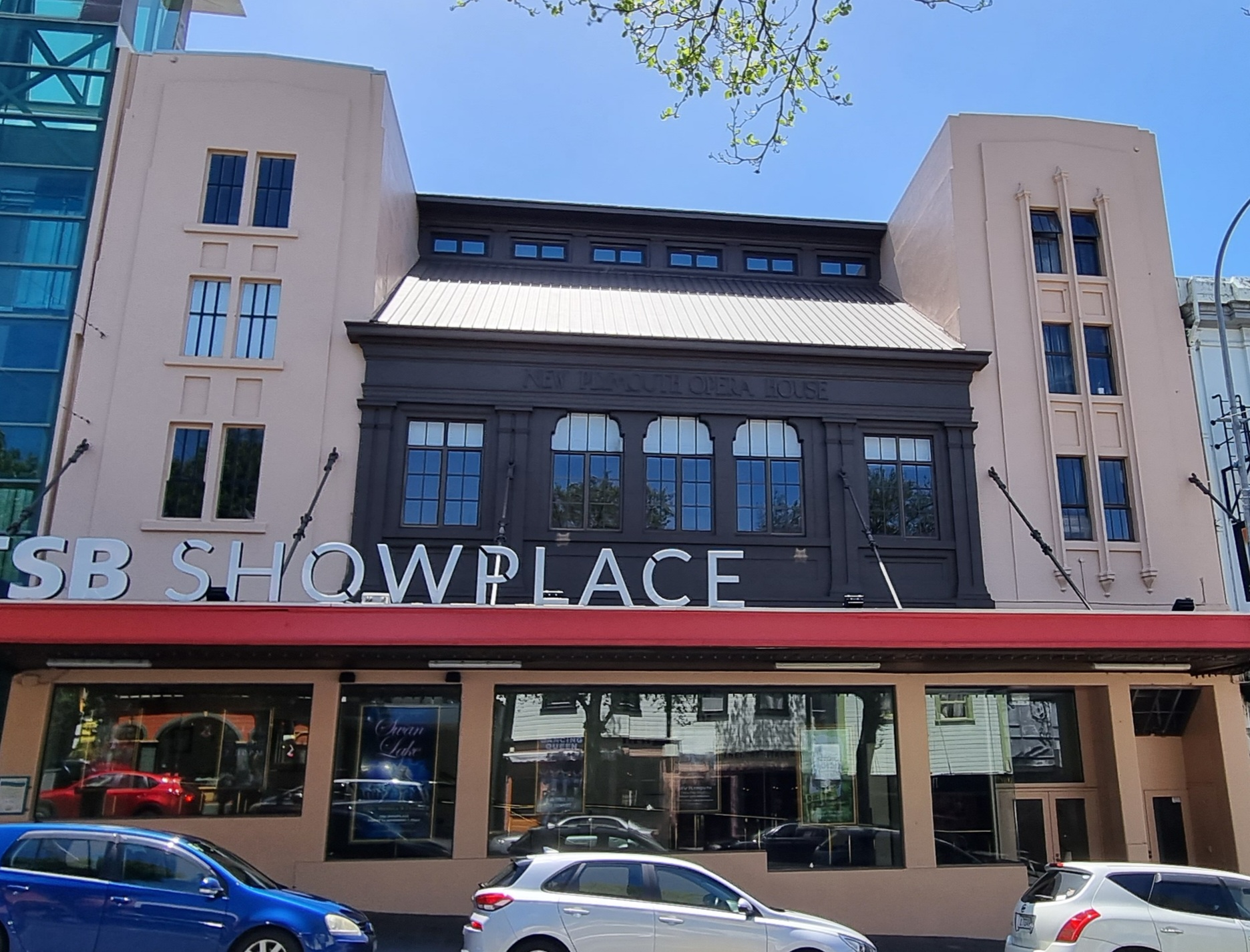
- New Plymouth Opera House
- Interactive map of the New Plymouth Opera House area

General information
- Location: 94 Devon Street West, New Plymouth Central, New Plymouth, New Zealand
- Coordinates: 39.058474°S 174.071293°E
- Construction started: 1924
- Completed: 1925
- Opened: 1925
- Inaugurated: 28 November 1925

Design and construction
- Architect: Thomas Herbert Bates

Heritage New Zealand – Category 2
- Designated: 1 September 1983
- Reference no.: 906

New Plymouth Opera House, now known as TSB Showplace, is the main performing arts venue in New Plymouth, New Zealand, with a history spanning over 100 years. It is now a Category 2 heritage building registered by Heritage New Zealand.

== History ==
The first theatre in New Plymouth was Alexander Hall, built in 1883 on Devon Street, on the same site as the current Opera House. It was expanded in 1904, renamed the Theatre Royal and sold to the New Plymouth Theatre Company. The theatre was destroyed by a big fire, along with many other buildings on the block, on 22 July 1916. The fire cleared the Devon Street block between Queen, King and Egmont Streets, except for the White Hart Hotel.

The reconstruction of the theatre started in 1924, when a building permit was granted to Taranaki Amusements. Designed by architect Thomas Herbert Bates, the new Opera House was built between 1924-1925 by J. T. Julian & Sons Ltd. Contractors, for an estimated cost of £23,000. The decorations were done by Clow, Buckley and Cross, while the furnishings were supplied by Baker and Company, including the stage curtain of gold velvet. The new Opera House, considered at the time “the most modern theatre in New Zealand”, was similar in size to other theatres in the country, but featured some new stage equipment, like special lighting effects. The vestibule was panelled with rimu and the access to the dress circle was done on a wide polished rimu staircase.

The Opera House was officially opened by New Plymouth Mayor F.E. Wilson on 28 November 1925, featuring a performance of the Irish comedy Molly Bawn by Denis Kehoe and his company.

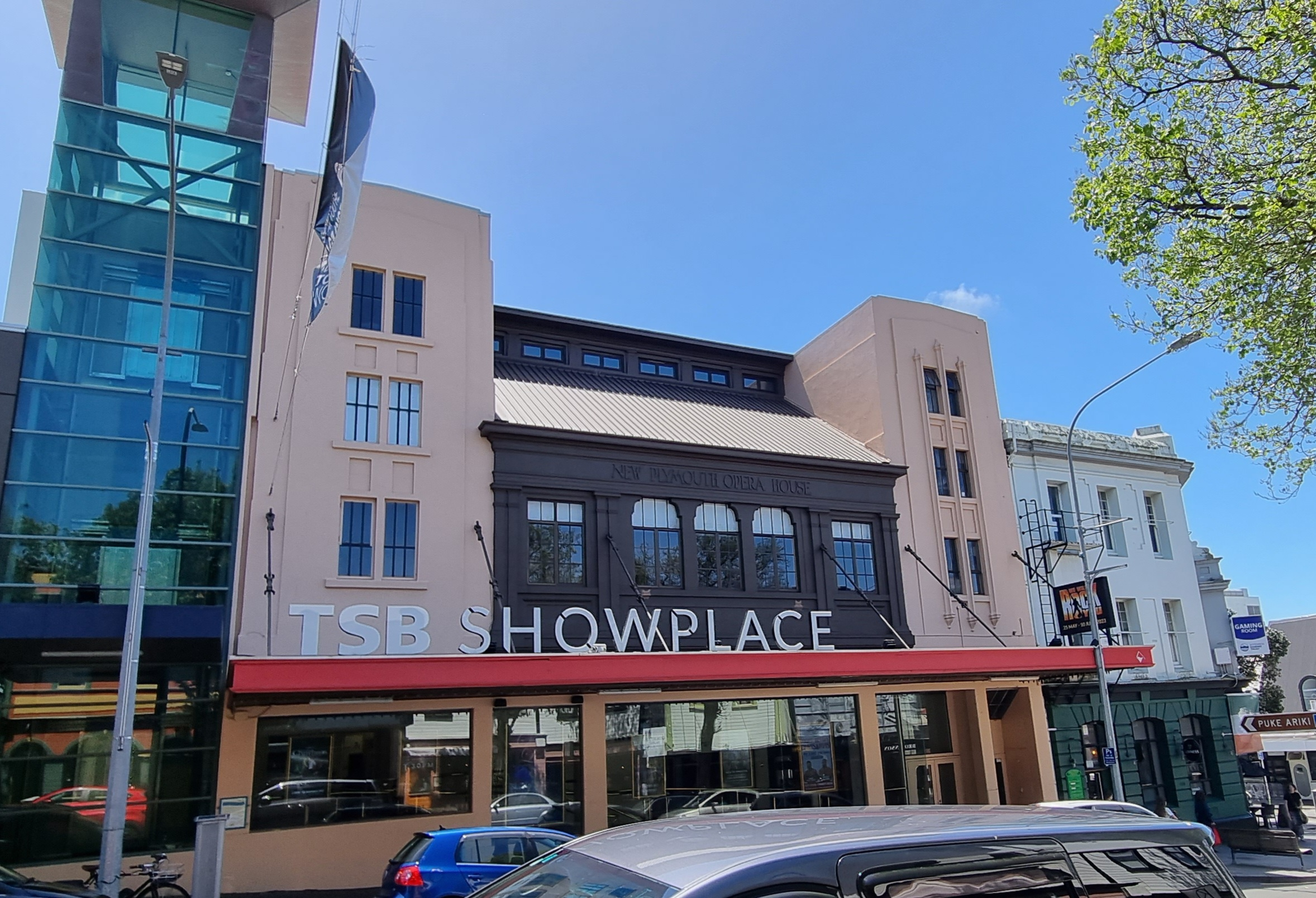
New Plymouth Opera House

In the following years, the Opera House was the centre of the city’s cultural life, featuring plays and movies, musical comedies, choirs and ensembles, orchestras and solo artists, even wrestling or boxing matches, magicians, dance recitals, political and religious meetings, or school ceremonies. Ice shows were also presented on a frozen stage.

However, the theatre faced demolition in 1969, due to financial difficulties and to the New Plymouth City Council’s refusal to purchase it. In order to save the Opera House from being demolished, the New Plymouth Operatic Society bought the building for $80,000 in 1970. Two years later, in 1972, the Society gifted the theatre in trust for the benefit of the people of New Plymouth.

Between 1997-1998 the building was renovated and extended with a second multi-purpose performance auditorium, Theatre Royal, and Alexandra Room. From that moment on, the original restored Opera House was known as the TSB Theatre. The inauguration of the whole complex, the TSB Showplace, was celebrated with a weekend gala on 6 and 7 February 1999.

In May 2012 both the TSB Showplace and the Govett Brewster Art Gallery were formally identified as earthquake prone under updated seismic standards. The following year, in September 2013, the Opera House was closed for a six month programme of strengthening work. That project, costing $800,000, lifted the venue from a pre work rating of less than 20% of the New Building Standard to a significantly improved 80% NBS.

Another refurbishment project started in October 2025, including seismic strengthening of the building and also improvements to the foyer, bar, toilets and ticket booth. The reopening of the TSB Showplace is planned by the New Plymouth Operatic Society for July 2026, with a “best of” compilation of iconic musical theatre shows and songs.
