= King Building, New Plymouth =

Heritage building in New Plymouth, New Zealand

King's Building
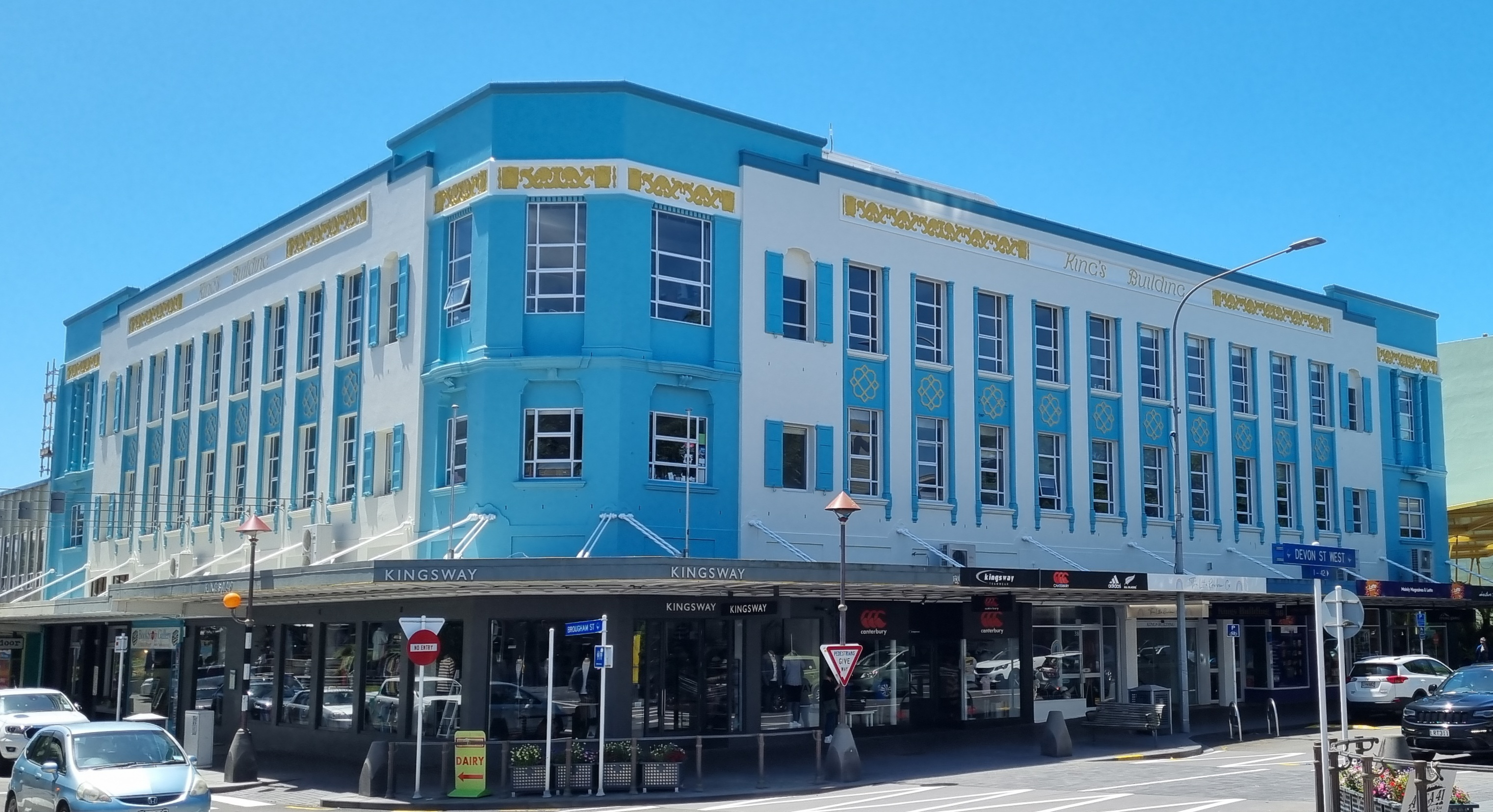
- King's Building
- Interactive map of the King's Building area

General information
- Location: 42 Devon Street West, New Plymouth Central, New Plymouth, New Zealand
- Coordinates: 39.057817°S 174.072975°E
- Construction started: 1926
- Completed: November 1927

Design and construction
- Architecture firm: Gummer and Ford

Heritage New Zealand – Category 2
- Designated: 1 September 1983
- Reference no.: 896

The King Building, also known as King's Building, in New Plymouth, New Zealand, is a Category 2 historic landmark, registered by Heritage New Zealand. Completed in November 1927 for Newton King Limited and named after the founder of the company, Newton King, the building is recognised for its unique Spanish Mission architectural style with Northern Italian details, a design chosen specifically to suit New Plymouth's climatic conditions.

== History ==
The 1926 project initiated by Newton King for a new commercial building at the busy intersection of Devon and Brougham Streets, long occupied by a worn‑out cluster of older buildings, (Note: After the old hospital building was moved from this site, it was replaced in 1874 by a two storeys wooden building hosting retail shops and offices.) marked a turning point in New Plymouth's architectural landscape. Its reinforced concrete frame, cutting‑edge for the period, signalled a new era of fire‑resistant, adaptable commercial architecture. The cost of the building, the largest commercial building of its type in New Plymouth at the time, was over £50,000.

Designed by the architects Gummer and Ford, the construction had not been easy. Buried logs and persistent flooding from the ever‑present Huatoki Stream complicated the foundations, yet the architects and the builders, Jones and Sandford of New Plymouth, carried the project through without quarrel or delay. After two years of construction, it was completed in November 1927, and it was considered architecturally revolutionary for New Zealand at the time. It featured Caen stone cement in deep buff tones, Atlas cement detailing in dull white, green shutters, black balcony grilles, and a carefully balanced colour scheme.

Over the years, the building suffered several alterations, like the windows being replaced in 1979, or having some improvements to the Huatoki Stream channel under the building in 1985-1986. Also, the building was repainted a few times, like in 2010.

== Description ==
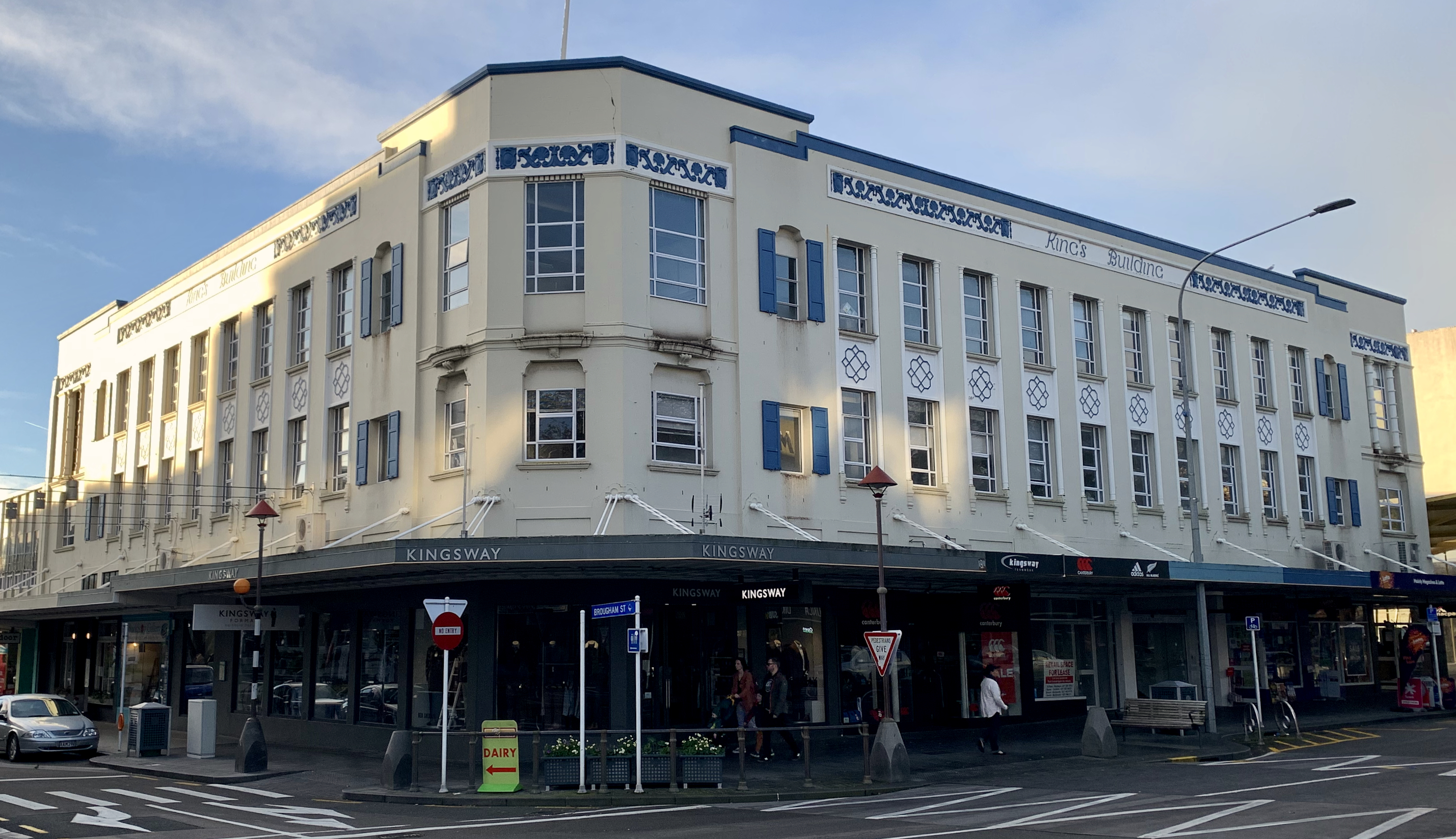
King’s Building in 2020

King's Building is a three-storey reinforced concrete building, with brick walls, designed to resist fire and earthquakes. It has a unique Spanish Mission inspired design, softened with Northern Italian details, unusual for New Zealand, chosen specifically to suit New Plymouth's climate.

The building presents lively façades with recessed planes, decorated spandrel panels and friezes, and small shuttered windows. The construction has high‑quality materials throughout, including Terrazzo marble staircases and shopfronts, Tasmanian blackwood joinery, Rimu office interiors, English hardware, and Scottish elevators. The offices were fitted with every modern convenience: telephone, heating, lighting, water, gas, and strong rooms.

The building featured a "imposing and spacious" Devon Street entrance leading to a marble staircase and passenger lift, a Brougham Street corridor with a trolleyway for goods, a large basement for storage, excellent ventilation and natural lighting throughout. On the ground floor there is a modern restaurant, flanked by shops and sample rooms. The first and second floors offered various office suites with modern amenities: telephone, heating, lighting, water, gas, and strong rooms. Atop the flat roof, it was a small initial penthouse, extended in 1995 and used by the current owners.
