= List of historic places in New Plymouth =

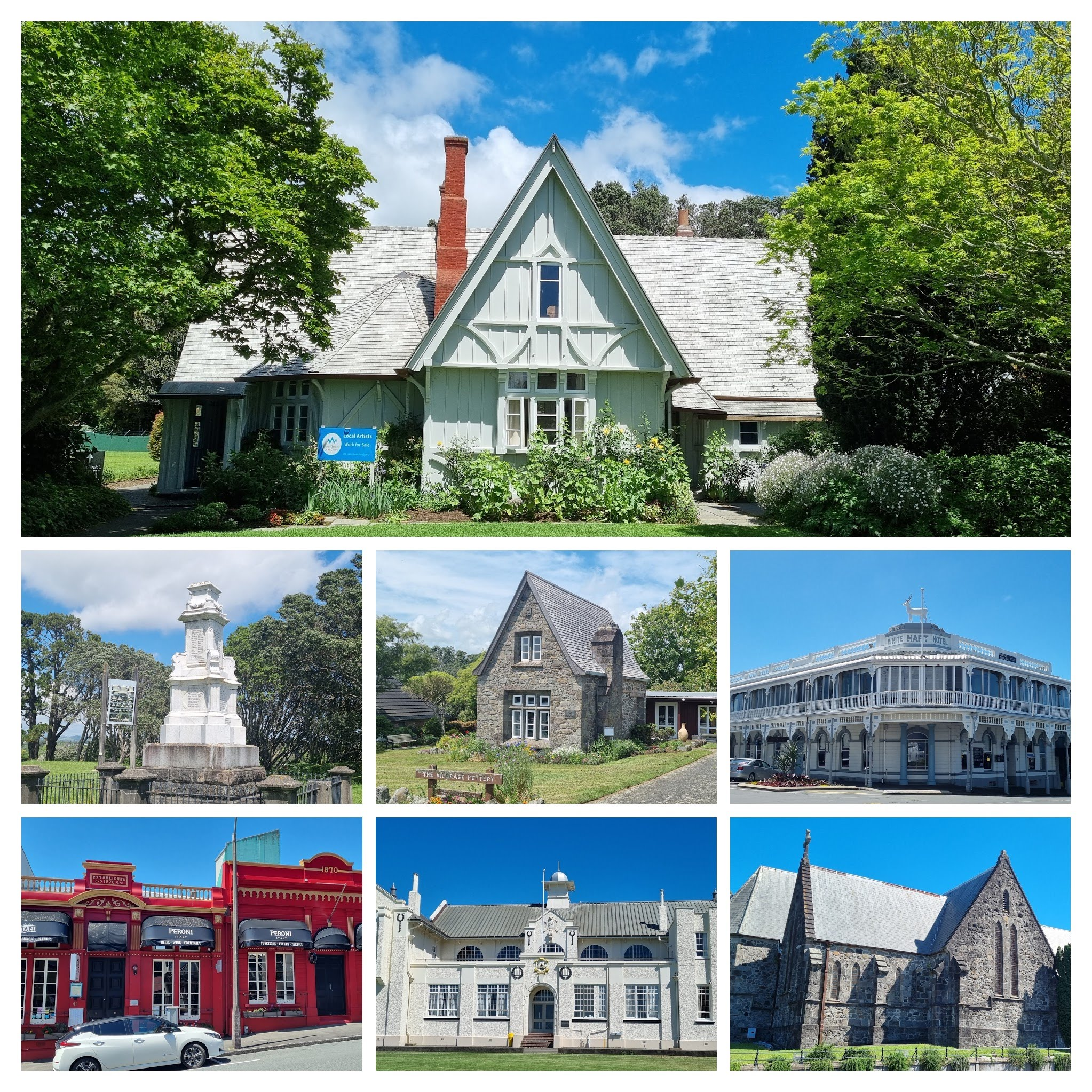
Montage of New Plymouth heritage buildings (from top left): The Gables Colonial Hospital, New Zealand Wars Memorial, Te Henui Vicarage, White Hart Hotel, Brougham Street Offices (Former), Pridham Hall Boys High School, St Mary's Church

The New Plymouth Heritage List contains the heritage sites and buildings from New Plymouth registered in the New Zealand Heritage List/Rārangi Kōrero (formerly the Register).

This list is maintained and updated by Heritage New Zealand (aka Heritage New Zealand Pouhere Taonga, initially the National Historic Places Trust and, from 1963 to 2014, the New Zealand Historic Places Trust).

One of New Plymouth District Council's goals is to preserve the local cultural heritage items, such as buildings, structures and areas, archaeological and Wāhi Tapu (sacred place) sites. New Plymouth District Council has admitted that "more work needs to be done" to protect some of the city's oldest heritage buildings.

Architecture Now magazine presented an itinerary in New Plymouth including heritage buildings and stated: "The city remains the location of some of the oldest surviving architect-designed buildings in New Zealand." One of the first settlers arriving in New Plymouth in 1843 was Frederick Thatcher, a London-trained architect. He came with the intention to become a farmer, but was drawn into design and civic administration. At the direction of Bishop Selwyn he designed St. Mary's Cathedral and at direction of Governor Sir George Grey designed one of four hospitals (The Gables Colonial Hospital) ambitiously intended to serve both Māori and settlers.

However, some heritage buildings were lost. The former Taranaki Education Board Offices, previously registered by Heritage New Zealand as a category 2 building with list number 912, and Arcadia Lodge, listed as a Category B heritage building by the New Plymouth District Council, were demolished in 2022. Also, in August 2024 the backs of the former CC Ward buildings on Devon and Currie streets were demolished, but the façades of the buildings remained. The Devon St East building is registered by Heritage New Zealand as a category 2 building with list number 884.

== List ==
Name	List Type	Address	Number	Image
The Gables (Colonial Hospital)	Historic Place Category 1	Brooklands Park Drive	29	
Hurworth	Historic Place Category 1	906 Carrington Road	144	
Whiteley Mission House	Historic Place Category 1	453–457 St Aubyn Street	145	
Plas Mawr	Historic Place Category 1	26 Standish Street And Wallace Place	146	
Pridham Hall (New Plymouth Boys High School)	Historic Place Category 1	95–103 Eliot Street	147	
Taranaki Cathedral Church of St Mary (Anglican)	Historic Place Category 1	37 Vivian Street, Robe Street And Brougham Street	148	
White Hart Hotel	Historic Place Category 1	118–124 Devon Street West And Queen Street	149	
Boer War Memorial (Relocated)	Historic Place Category 2	Devon Mall [relocated to Marsland Hill Reserve]	845	
Band Rotunda	Historic Place Category 2	Fillis Street, Pukekura Park	882	
C.C. Ward Limited Building (Former)	Historic Place Category 2	47 Currie Street and 6 Devon Street East	884	
Cenotaph	Historic Place Category 2	Queen Street and St Aubyn Street	885	
Brougham Street Offices (Former)	Historic Place Category 2	41–43 Brougham Street	888	
Devonport Flats	Historic Place Category 2	127–131 St Aubyn Street/State Highway 44 and 9 Dawson Street	890	
Entrance Gates, New Plymouth Boys High School	Historic Place Category 2	95–97 Eliot Street	891	
Te Henui Vicarage	Historic Place Category 1	290 Courtenay Street, Strandon	892	
Holy Trinity Church (Anglican)	Historic Place Category 1	12 Henui Street, Fitzroy	893	
Honeyfield Drinking Fountain	Historic Place Category 2	Regina Place, Dawson Street and Hine Street	894	
King Building	Historic Place Category 2	42 Devon Street West	896	
Kiosk	Historic Place Category 2	Fillis St, Pukekura Park	897	
Mayfair Cinema	Historic Place Category 2	67 Devon Street West	898	
Te Henui Primitive Methodist Church	Historic Place Category 2	505 Devon Street East, Strandon	899	
National Bank Building	Historic Place Category 2	27 Brougham Street	901	
New Plymouth Prison	Historic Place Category 1	1 Downe Street and Robe Street, Marsland Hill	903	
New Zealand Wars Memorial	Historic Place Category 1	51 Robe Street, Marsland Hill / Pukaka	904	
Opera House	Historic Place Category 2	94 Devon Street & Egmont St	906	
Queen Victoria Monument	Historic Place Category 2	Fillis Street, Pukekura Park	908	
Scotland Cottage	Historic Place Category 2	54 Mangorei Road, Strandon	910	
St Andrew's Church (Presbyterian)	Historic Place Category 2	70–72A Liardet Street	911	
New Plymouth Savings Bank (Former)	Historic Place Category 2	87 Devon Street West	913	
Taranaki Club Building	Historic Place Category 2	4 Queen Street	914	
Willowfield	Historic Place Category 2	37 Cameron Street	2733	
Puketarata Pā	Historic Place Category 2	Hendrie Street, Welbourn	5968	
Parihamore Pā	Historic Place Category 2	Bell Street, Welbourn	5969	
Pā	Historic Place Category 2	Katere Scenic Reserve	5970	
Flight House	Historic Place Category 2	54 Mangorei Road, Strandon	7086	
Richmond Cottage	Historic Place Category 1	2–6 Ariki Street	7088	
Roebuck House	Historic Place Category 2	4 Powderham Street	7110	
House	Historic Place Category 2	7 Ridge Lane	7147	
Hirst Family "Hen and Chickens" Historic Area	Historic Area	37 Cameron Street and 84–102 Pendarves Street	7202	
Bates House	Historic Place Category 2	124 Pendarves Street	7222	
Public Trust Office (Former)	Historic Place Category 2	52 King Street and 29 Queen Street	7237	
The Poet's Bridge	Historic Place Category 2	Pukekura Park, 10 Fillis Street	7238	
St Aubyn Chambers	Historic Place Category 2	1 Queen Street	7451	
PS Tasmanian Maid wreck site	Historic Place Category 1	Kawaroa (Long) Reef	9521	

== See also ==
- Category:Lists of historic places in New Zealand

== Bibliography ==
Heritage New Zealand, New Zealand Heritage List
