= Boer War Memorial, New Plymouth =

War memorial in New Plymouth, New Zealand

- New Zealand
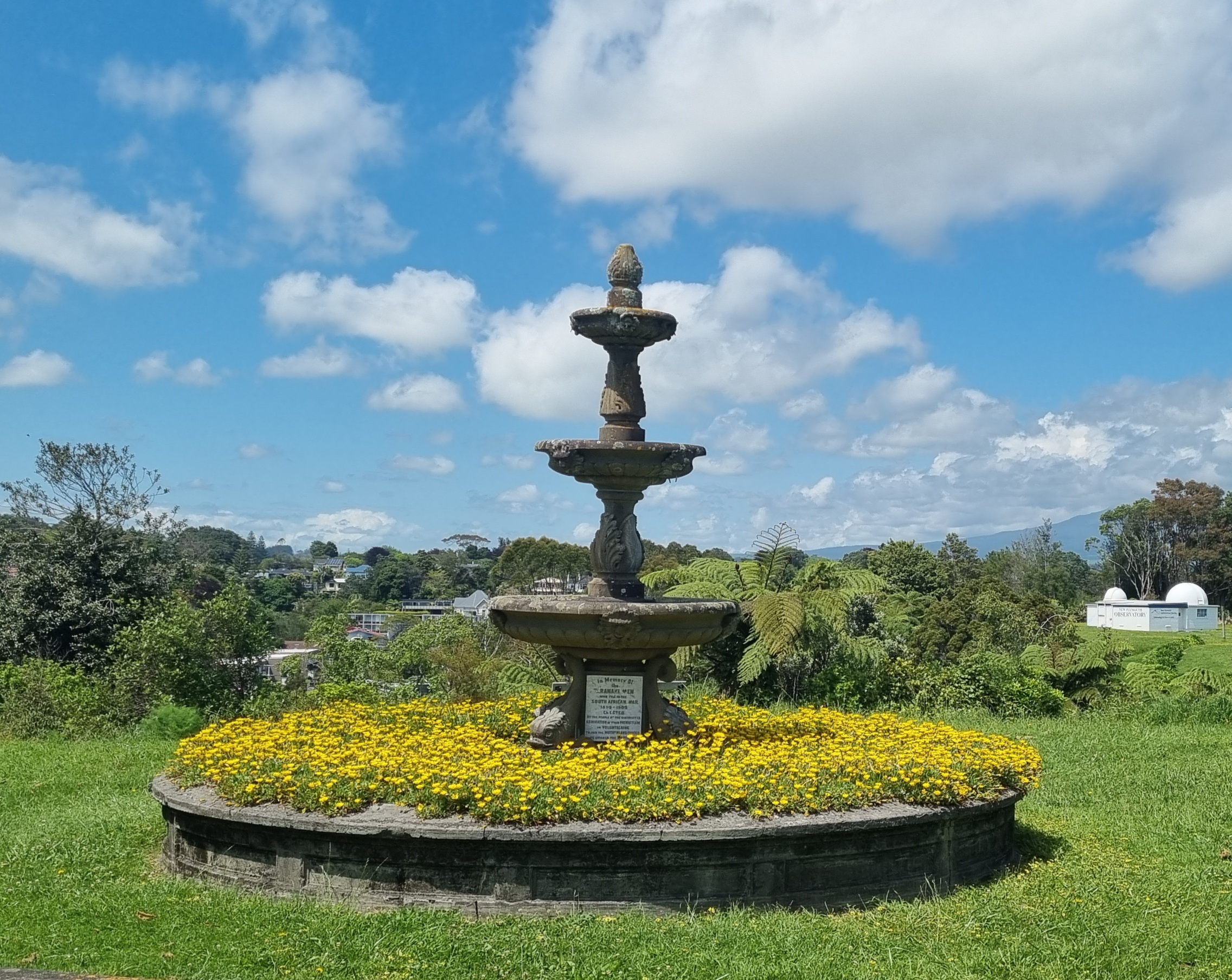
- New Plymouth South African War memorial
- For the memory of Taranaki men who fell in the South African War (1899–1908).
- Established: 1911
- Unveiled: 26 January 1911
- Location: 39°3′40.892″S 174°4′25.903″E; Marsland Hill, New Plymouth
- Designed by: William Francis Short

Heritage New Zealand – Category 2
- Official name: Boer War Memorial (Relocated)
- Designated: 9 September 1983
- Reference no.: 845

The Boer War Memorial from New Plymouth, New Zealand, is a Category 2 heritage place registered by Heritage New Zealand, situated on Marsland Hill. It was erected and unveiled in January 1911 in the memory of Taranaki men who fell in the South African Wars (1899–1908).

== History ==
Towards the end of the 19th century, a new fashion for building memorials had begun in New Zealand, initially being less about honouring the dead, but to emphasize the pride of the people about the contribution to the empire and as moral examples to the younger generation.

Most of those marble memorials were imported from Carrara, Italy, but the Boer War Memorial from New Plymouth was carved from Australian blue granite by local mason William Francis Short. (Note: William Francis Short was the one responsible for the New Zealand Wars memorial scroll at Taranaki Cathedral Church of St Mary and the drinking fountain in Pukekura Park, both from New Plymouth.) It was erected on Marsland Hill by the people of the district, in the memory of the Taranaki men who fell in the South African Wars between 1899 and 1908. The memorial was unveiled by the Governor, Lord Islington, on 26 January 1911, during a big ceremony with a guard of honor from the Taranaki Rifles and Taranaki Guards, several relatives of the troopers whose names appears on the memorial and a number of local veterans from the South African War in attendance.

In 1979, the central column of the monument was moved from its original location on Marsland Hill to the newly created Devon Mall pedestrian precinct, where it was modified to perform as a fountain. The base pool was left in place on Marsland Hill, filled with soil and had an olive tree planted inside.

After the Devon Mall was demolished and re-opened to traffic in 1997, the memorial, with the fountain no longer operational, was moved back the following year to its original site on Marsland Hill.

== Description ==
Situated on Marsland Hill next to another memorial, created to commemorate the New Zealand Wars, the Boer War Memorial consists of a central column and a concrete base pool, now a flowerbed. Carved from Australian blue granite by New Plymouth mason William Francis Short, it is decorated with floral motifs, gorgon heads and fish.

At the base of the fountain, there are 4 commemorative plaques, 2 of them with the names of the people who died in the South African War. On another one: "In memory of the Taranaki men who fell in the South African War 1899 -1902 / Erected by the people of the district in admiration of their patriotism in volunteering to join the Motherland forces to uphold the Empire" and "Unveiled by His Excellency the Governor Lord Islington KCMG DSO 26 January 1911 /W.F. Short New Plymouth".

== Gallery ==
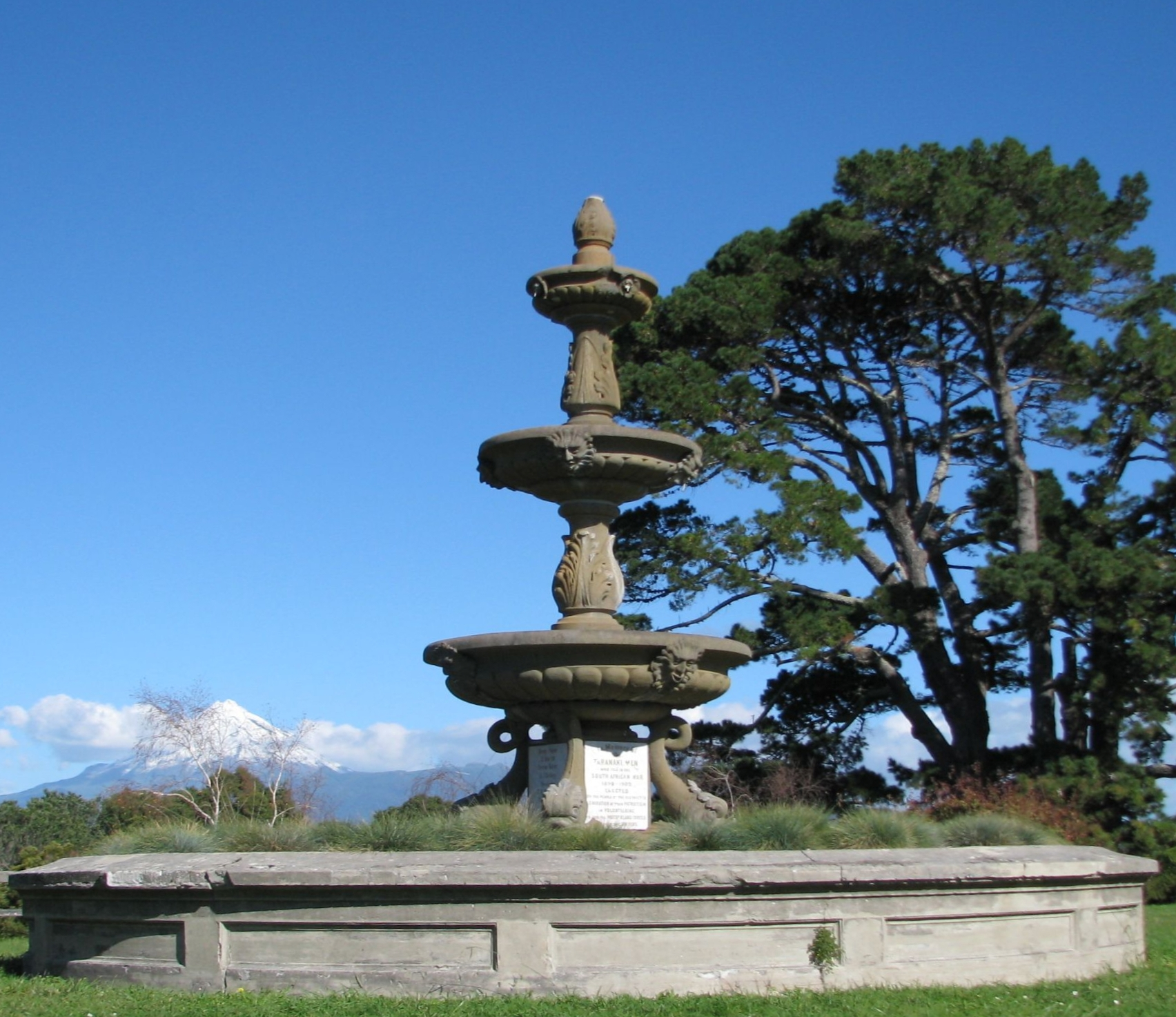
Boer War Memorial, New Plymouth

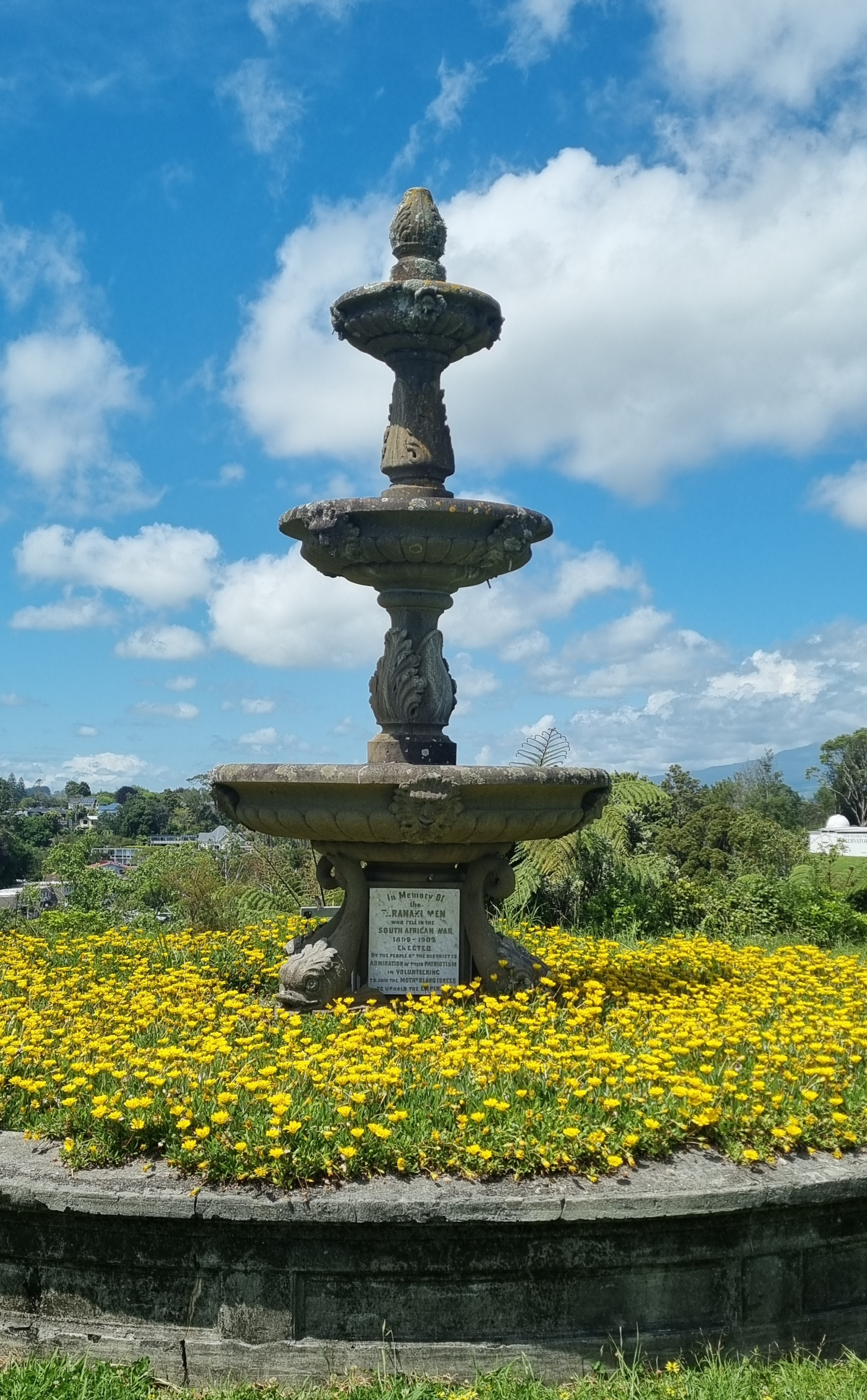
Boer War Memorial, New Plymouth

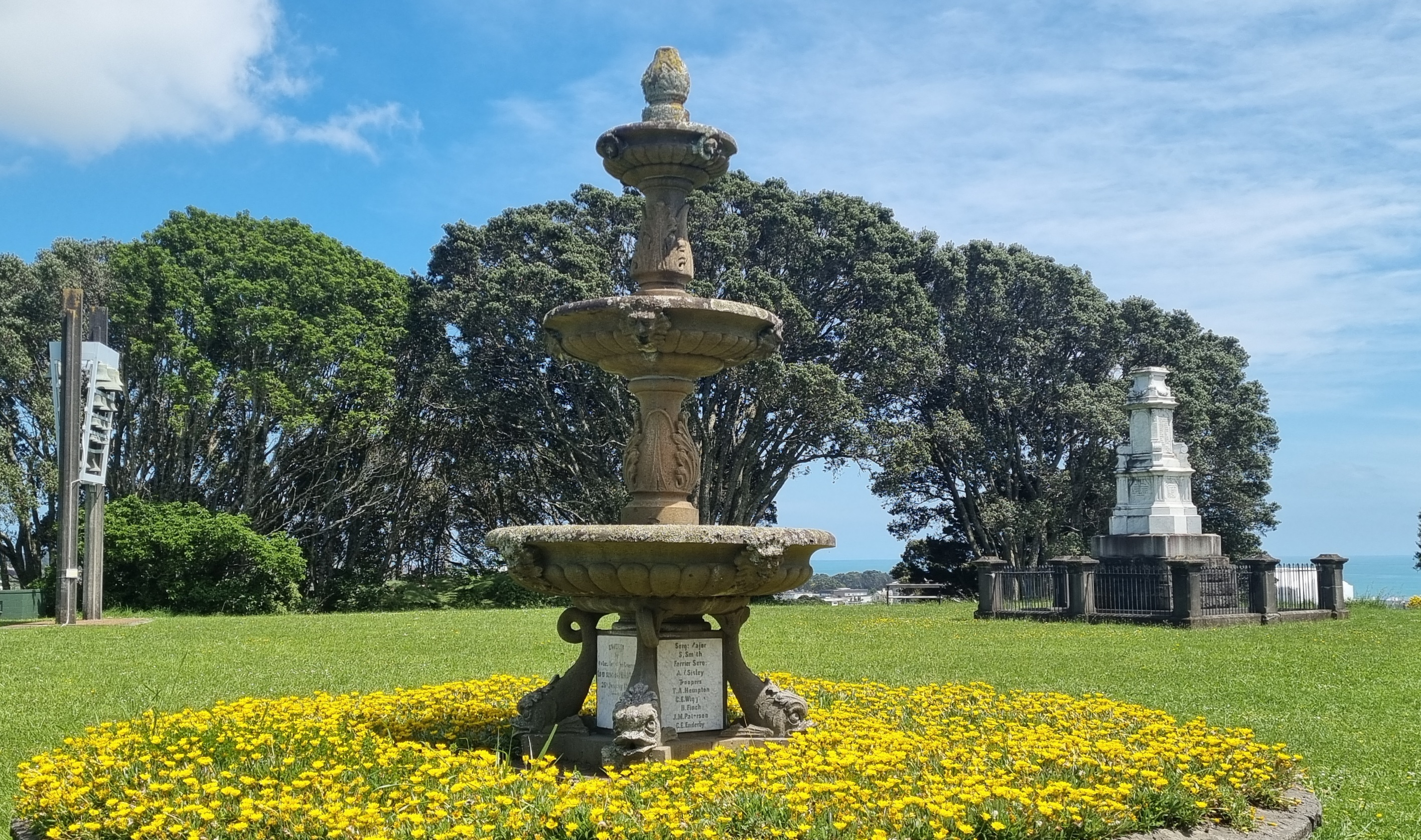
Marsland Hill

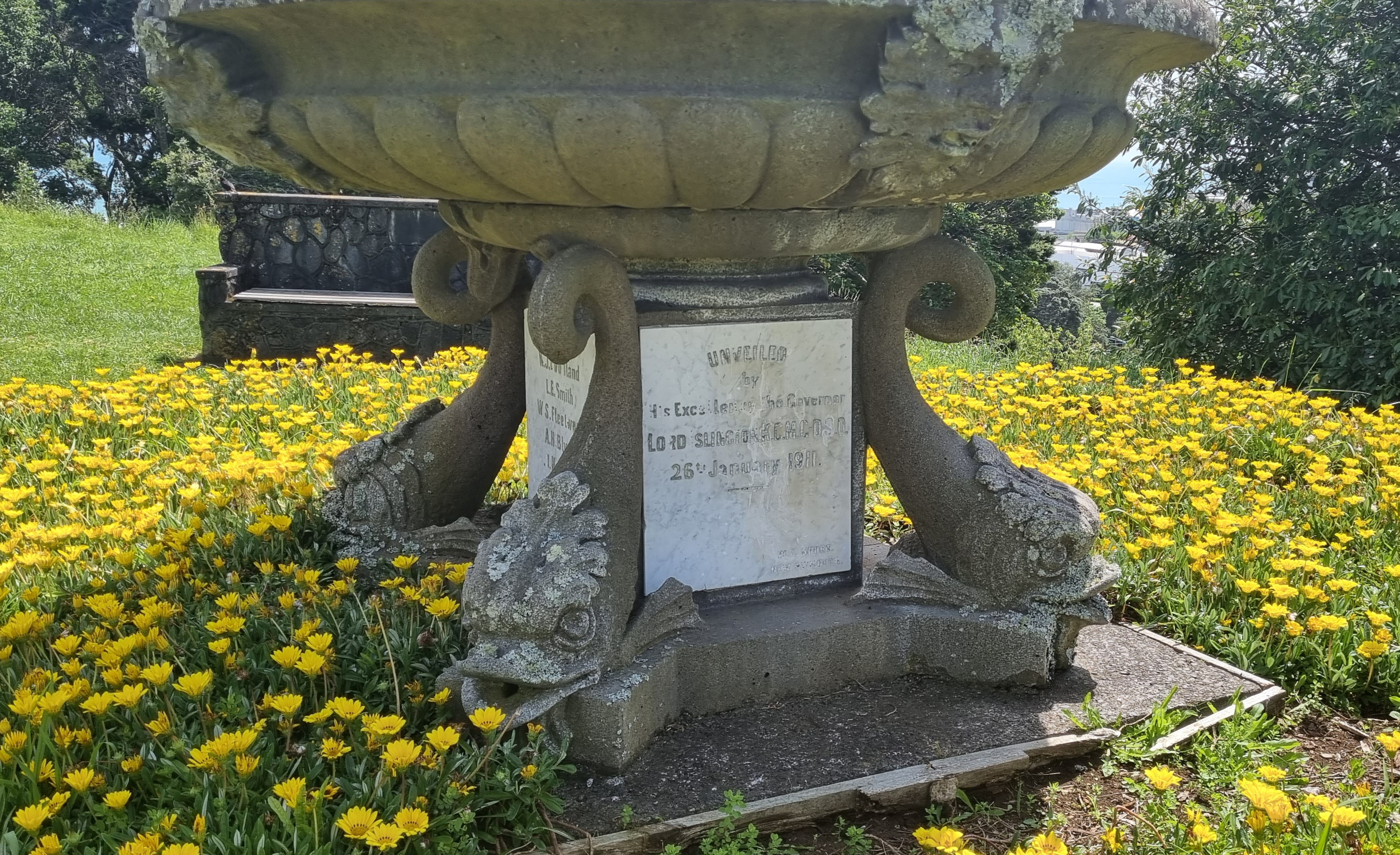
Commemorative plaque

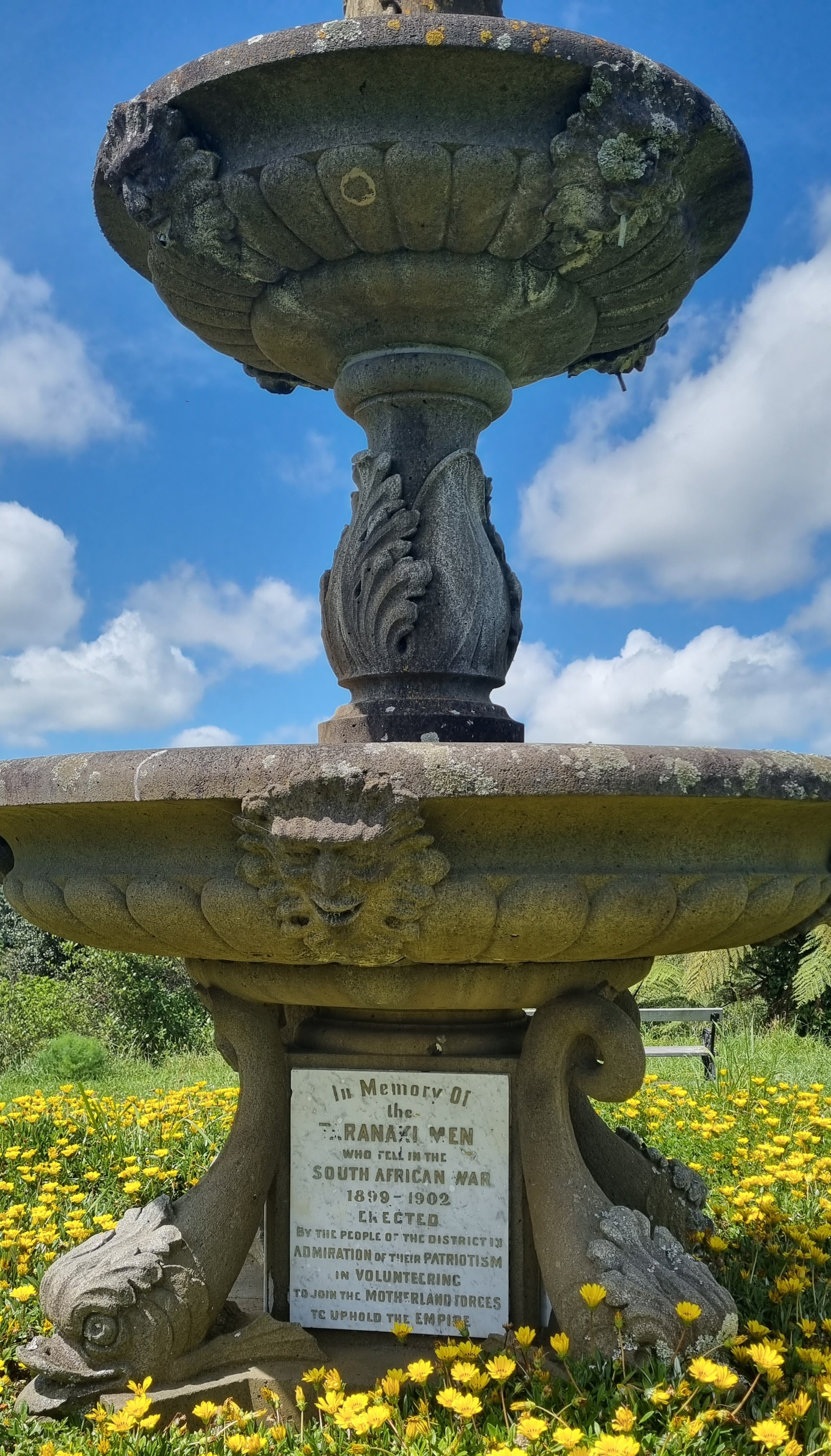
Commemorative plaque

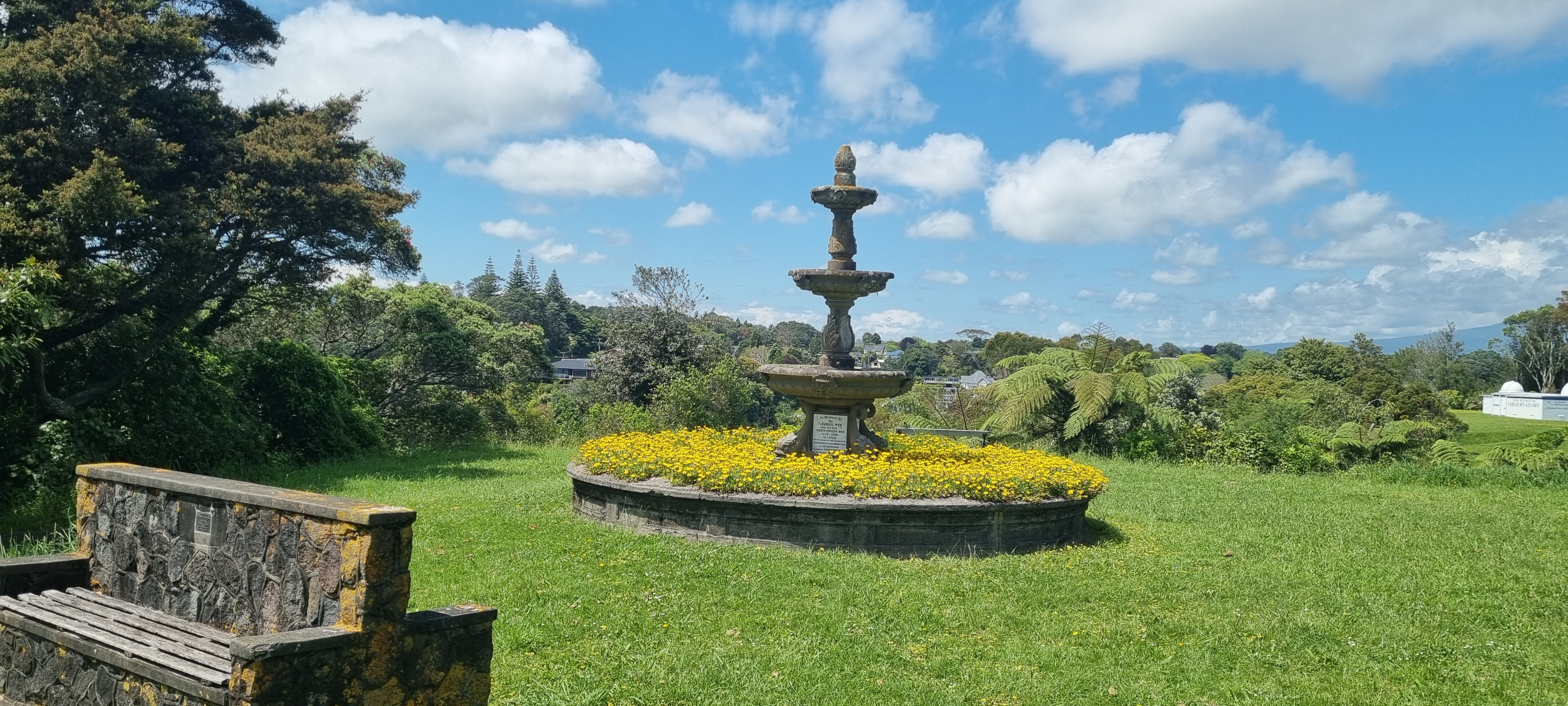
Marsland Hill
