= Robert Hughes (conservationist) =

New Zealand lawyer and conservationist

Robert Clinton Hughes (July 1847 – 18 January 1935) was a New Zealand lawyer and conservationist.

Hughes was born in Auckland, New Zealand in 1847, but the family moved to New Plymouth when he was a young child. He was a lawyer by trade and had his own practice from 1870 when he was admitted to the bar. From July 1874 until the abolition of the provincial government system in 1876, he represented the Town of New Plymouth electorate on the Taranaki Provincial Council. Subsequently, he served on the New Plymouth borough council. He was one of three candidates in the 1890 election contesting the New Plymouth electorate, and he came last.

On 1 December 1898, Hughes married Amy Grace Burton at Dunedin. He died without having had children on 18 January 1935 in New Plymouth, survived by his wife.

Hughes's former Brougham Street Offices, which opened in 1896, are listed as a Category 2 heritage building.
