= Whiteley Mission House, New Plymouth =

Heritage house in New Plymouth, New Zealand

Whiteley Mission House New Plymouth
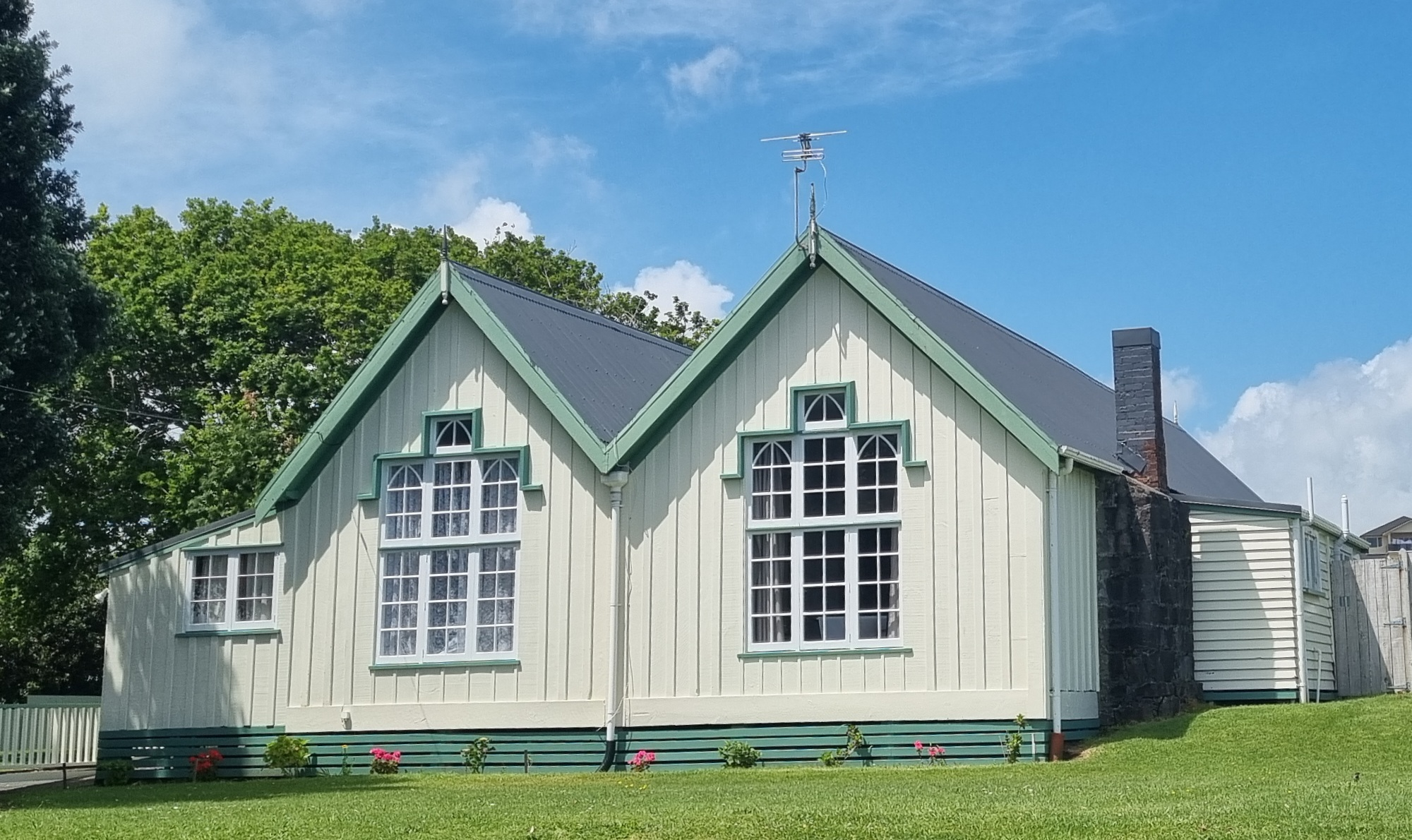
- Interactive map of the Whiteley Mission House; New Plymouth area

General information
- Architectural style: Gothic Revival
- Location: 453-457 St Aubyn Street, New Plymouth, New Zealand
- Coordinates: 39.062343°S 174.048534°E
- Completed: 1854

Heritage New Zealand – Category 1
- Designated: 28 June 1990
- Reference no.: 145

The Whiteley Mission House from New Plymouth, New Zealand, the only surviving building of the former Grey Institute, is one a few examples of mission-style architecture from the early period of European settlement. Built as a school for local Maori girls in 1854, it is also a remainder of the beginnings of European style education in Taranaki.

The Whiteley Mission House is one of the heritage buildings from New Plymouth, registered in 1990 by Heritage New Zealand as a Category 1 Historic Place.

== History ==
The Wesleyan Missionary Society started sending missionaries to New Zealand from 1822 in order to ″to propose the gospel″, but ″refraining from disputing the superstitions of the natives″. Their declared purpose was to learn the local people language and to teach them labour skills, farming, etc.

After a number of setbacks, in 1838 the mission sent two Maori teachers, Wiremu Nera Te Awa-I-Taia and Hahaia, to Taranaki, to begin missionary activity.

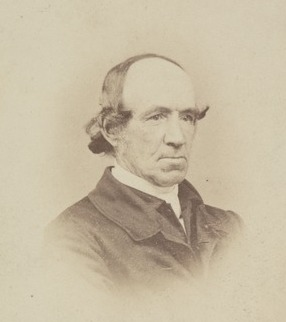
Reverend John Whiteley

In January 1840, Edward Meurant, on behalf of the Wesleyan Missionary Society, bought 100 acres (40.47 hectares) of land at Ngamotu, New Plymouth. The sale was ratified by Commissioner William Spain on 31 March 1845 and Charles Creed established here a mission station.

He was replaced in 1844 by missionary Henry Hanson Turton. With funds obtained under the Education Ordinance of 1847, Turton built a boarding school for Maori pupils next to the mission house. Visiting the mission in March 1847, Governor Sir George Grey offered government assistance and made a small donation himself. As a recognition of Governor Sir George Grey's support, the school was named the Grey Institute, identical to the Wesleyan Native Institute at Grafton Road, Auckland (later moved to Three Kings). Realizing the success of the school, Turton initiated an institution for Maori girls in 1854.

Similar to the boys' school, the rimu building included elements of the Gothic Revival architecture, with two steep gables and arched windows in the front façade. Built in board and battens the school had a roof of timber shingles and included a dining and sitting room, a wash house and a dormitory for 25 students.

Henry Hanson Turton was replaced in 1856 by Reverend John Whiteley, the new Wesleyan Missionary Society missionary at Ngamotu and in charge of the Grey Institute. Unfortunately, the conflicts over land and sovereignty in Taranaki forced the school to close, but in February next year Whiteley reopened it. He moved in the mission house and wrote a report emphasizing that the normal functioning of the school was totally dependent on the absence of war.

After the beginning of the Taranaki Wars in 1860, the Grey Institute was closed. John Whiteley moved back into town, and the students returned to their villages. In June, the former girls' school building was temporarily hired by the government to house Maori allies, removed from their district in order to avoid charges of complicity with "the rebels".

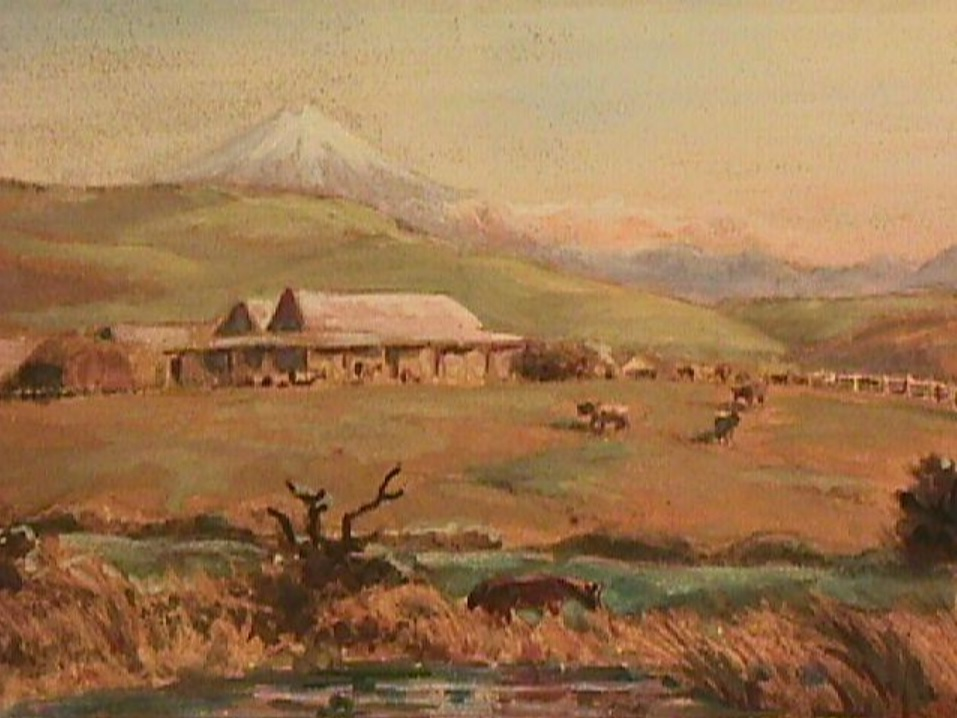
Whiteley Mission House in 1870

The learning for both boys and girls in the Grey Institute buildings resumed in 1865, when John Whiteley returned to the mission house. In September 1865 the government handed back the buildings, so Whiteley could carry on with the Grey lnstitute. That year there were twenty-four Maori boys and girls and twelve adults boarding there. Then, on 13 February 1869, while riding from New Plymouth to White Cliffs, Whiteley, who had openly declared his support for the government, fell victim to a Hauhau ambush, and was shot. After that, the school was closed permanently and the mission station abandoned.

In 1878, a shortage of funding determined the Wesleyan Church to sell the Grey Institute building. The former mission house became a Maori minister's parsonage and the original educational purpose of the building had been forgotten.

Later, in 1940, the Mission House was renovated and reopened as Rangiatea College, a boarding school of domestic science and hygiene for Maori girls until 1959, when new premises were established at Spotswood. The Moturoa property is now held by the Grey Institute Trust of the Methodist Church. Since 1960 the building has been occupied by the resident caretaker and run as a community centre.

Next to the mission house is the Moturoa Chapel, built in 1869 for Zaccheus Wells on his farm at Mangorei for the use of settlers and shifted in 1940 to its present site.

== Image gallery ==
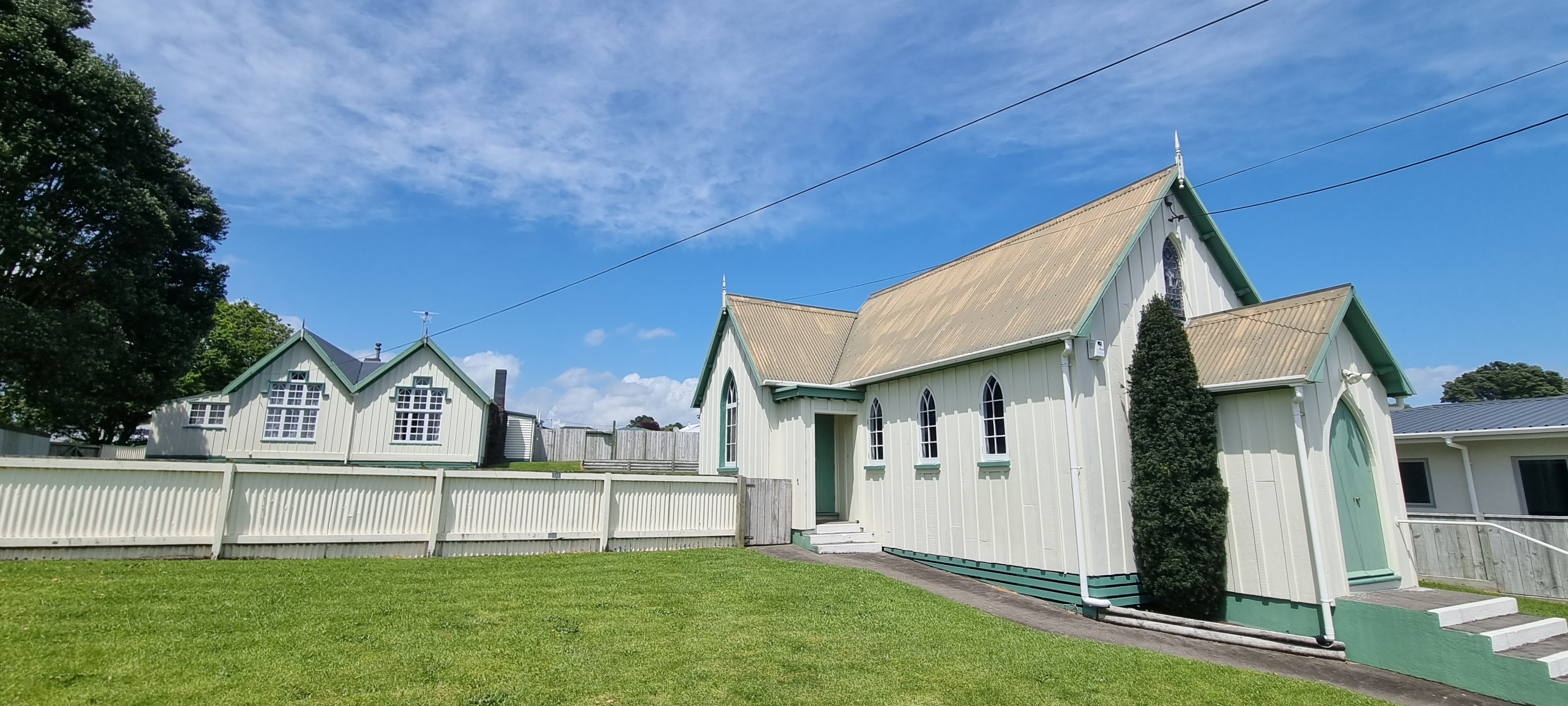
Whiteley Mission House and chapel

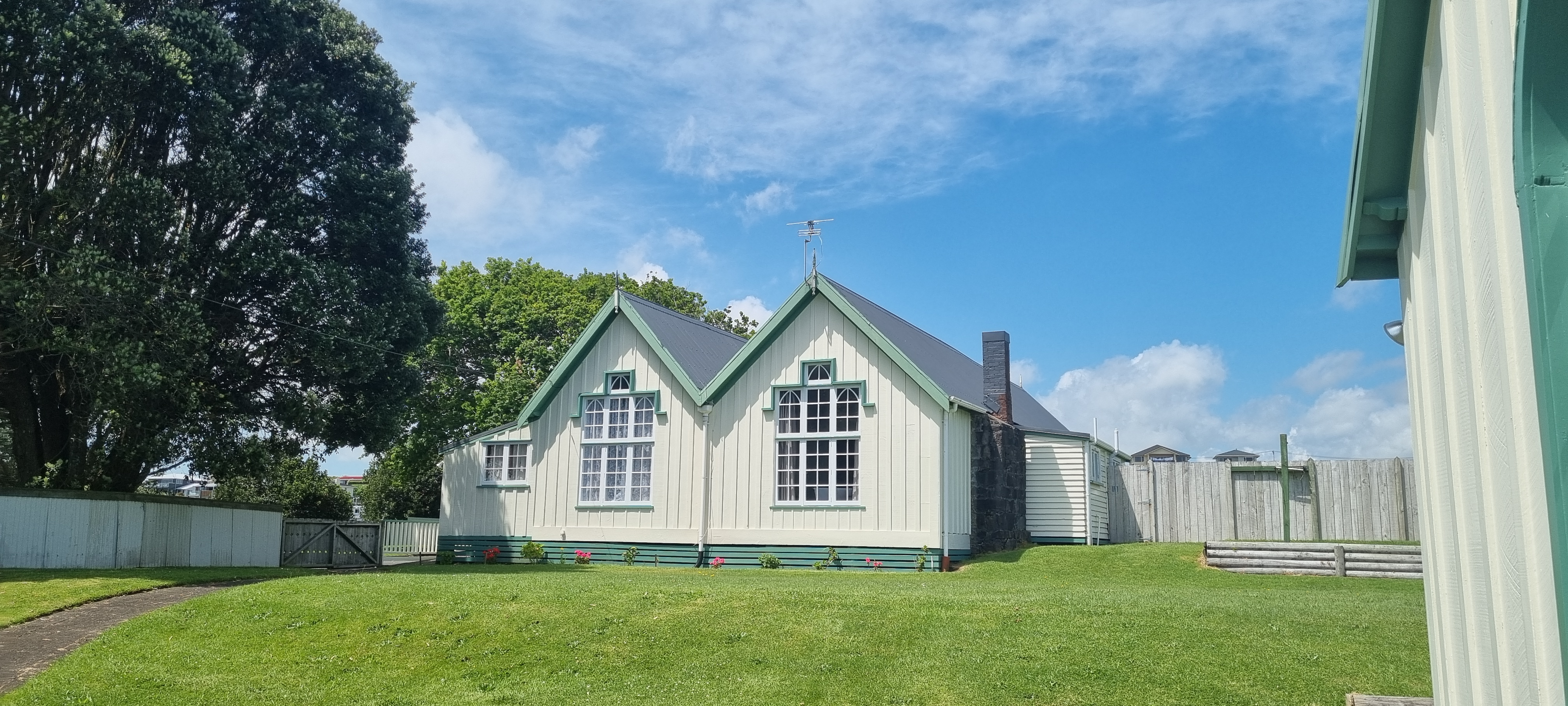
The Mission House

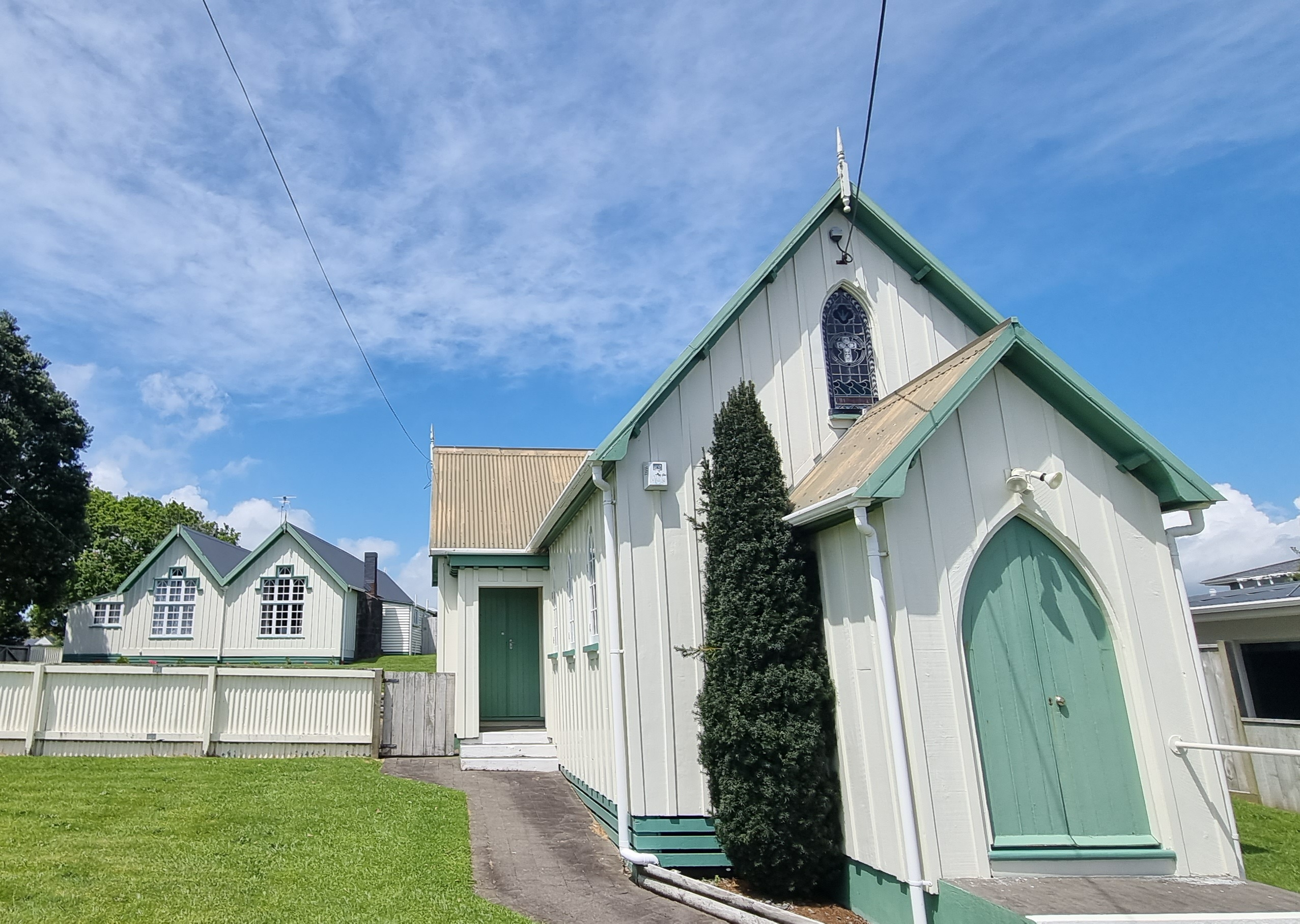
The Chapel

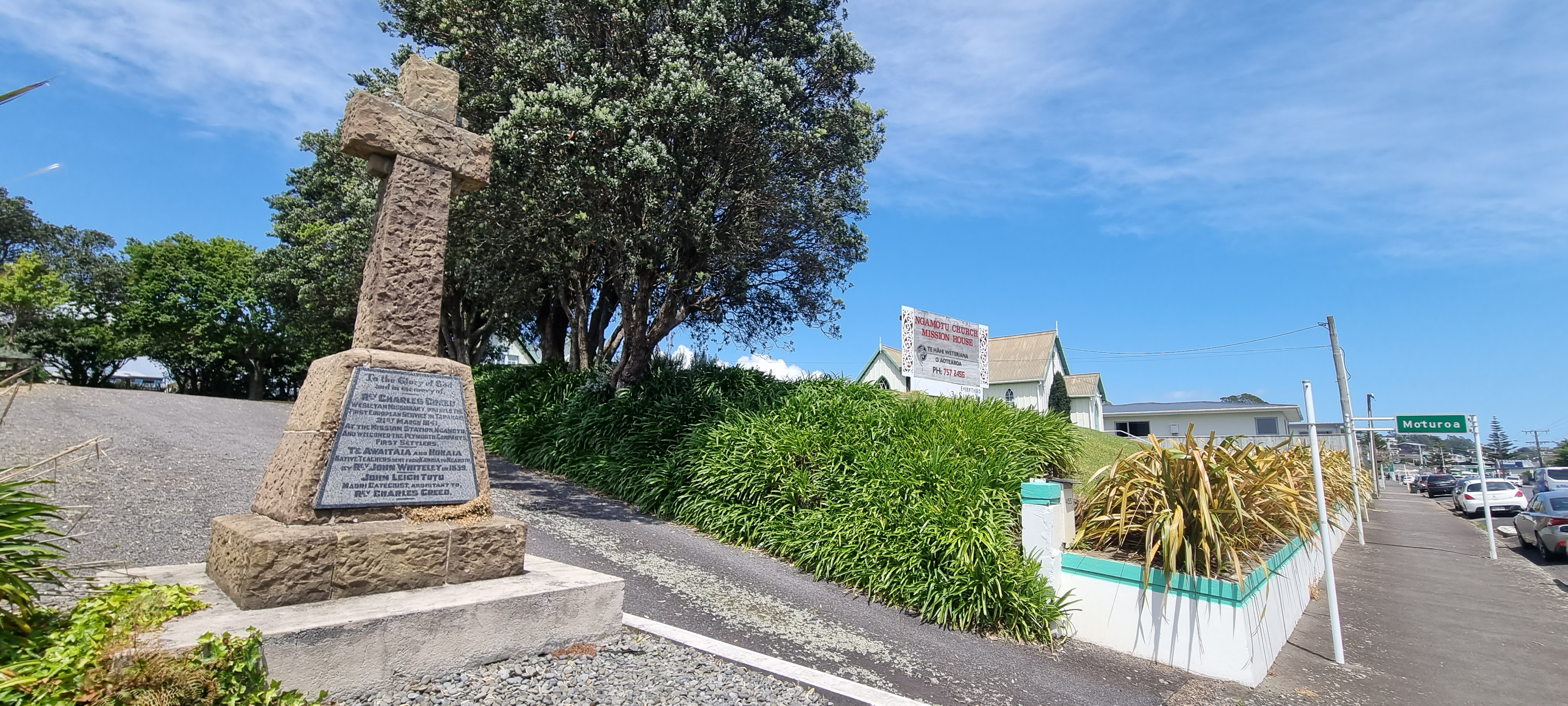
Memorial Cross

== Bibliography ==
- Heritage New Zealand, New Zealand Heritage List
- Porter, Frances; Historic Buildings of New Zealand: North Island, New Zealand Historic Places Trust, Auckland, N.Z., Cassell Ltd., 1979, ISBN 0908572115
