= Pridham Hall =

Heritage school building in New Plymouth, New Zealand

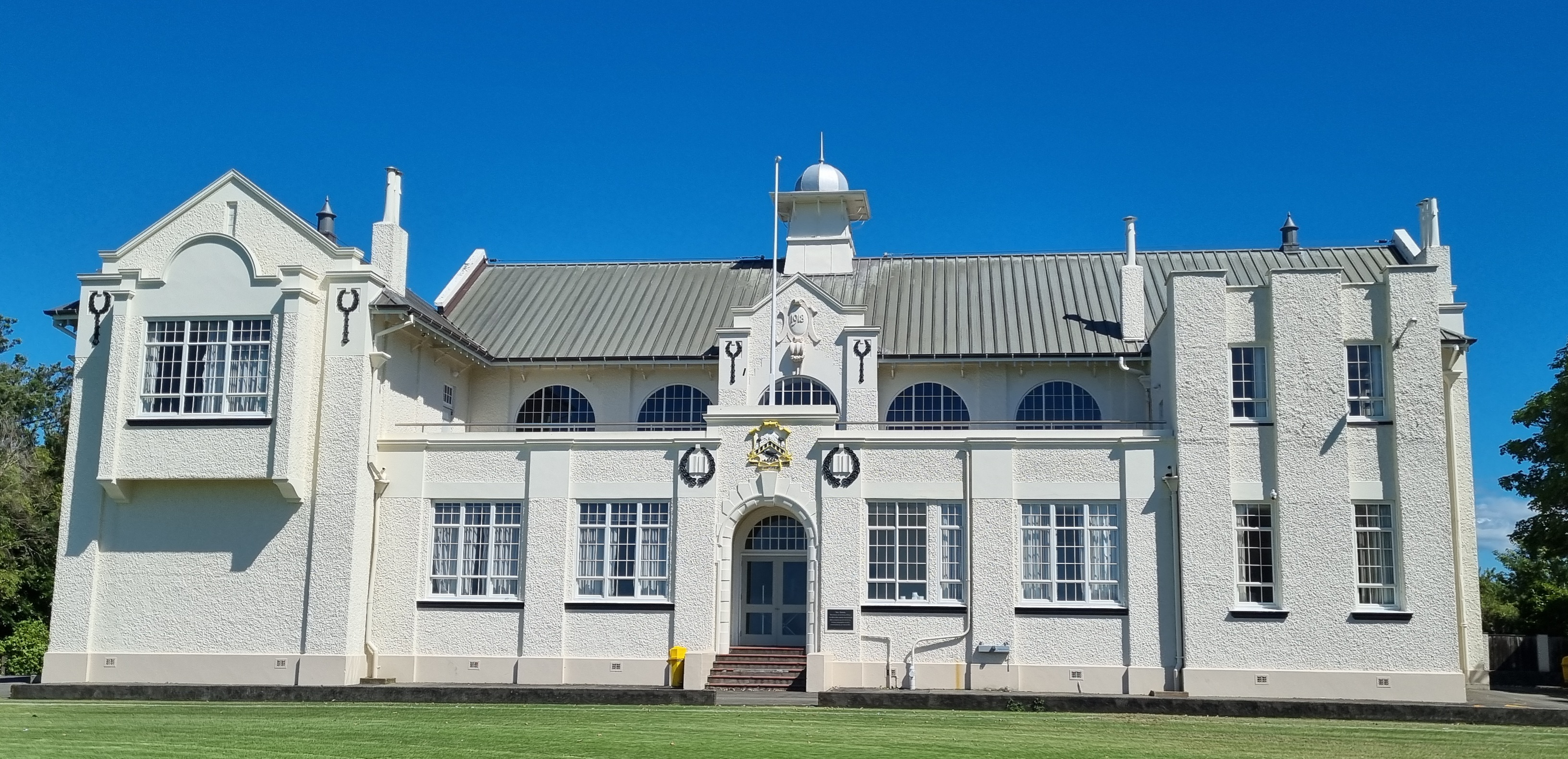
- Pridham Hall (New Plymouth Boys High School)
- Interactive map of the Pridham Hall area

General information
- Architectural style: Edwardian Free Style
- Location: 95-103 Eliot Street, New Plymouth, New Zealand
- Coordinates: 39.060192°S 174.085968°E
- Construction started: 1918
- Completed: 1919

Design and construction
- Architect: William Cumming

Heritage New Zealand – Category 1
- Reference no.: 147

Pridham Hall, long time the main building of New Plymouth Boys' High School, was named after the first headmaster of the school, Ernest Pridham, a Master of Arts graduate from Dublin. The Hall is one of the historic buildings in New Plymouth, New Zealand, registered by Heritage New Zealand as a Category 1 Historic Place.

== History ==
New Plymouth Boys' High School was established by an Act of Parliament in 1878 and officially opened in 1882 on land reserved in the earliest plans of the settlement. As by the 1910s, the school’s roll had grown beyond the capacity of its original facilities, the Board envisioned a comprehensive new building, one that would provide the full suite of spaces required for modern education.

The new building was designed by the New Zealand architect William Cumming, then president of the Institute of Architects and architect to the Auckland Grammar School Board. His proposal, however, exceeded the Board’s resources. With only £3500 in insurance funds and a government still recovering from wartime expenditure, the initial design had to be pared back. Essential elements such as the assembly hall, west wing, and bell tower were deemed “luxuries” and removed. Yet the community refused to accept a school without a hall. Under the leadership of headmaster William Henry Moyes, a public appeal was launched, and the generosity of local supporters ensured that both the hall and the west wing could be built after all.

Pridham Hall was built by Boon Bros of New Plymouth, replacing the school's original 1881 wooden building, which was entirely destroyed by a devastating fire in August 1916. Built between 1918-1919, it was for a very long time the main building of the school. Set side‑on to the road and overlooking the cricket pavilion, Pridham Hall became the architectural and spiritual centre of the school. For a time, the entire school operated within its walls. But growth continued and additional rooms were added in 1923, only to be destroyed by fire three years later, a setback that sent students to temporary quarters at the racecourse until repairs were completed. Today, Pridham Hall remains in active use, though primarily as a classroom block for English, history, geography, and social studies. Its scale and layout offer a tangible measure of the school’s size in the early twentieth century, while its façade stands as a reminder of the financial constraints of the post‑war era and the community’s determination to provide a proper hall.

== Description ==
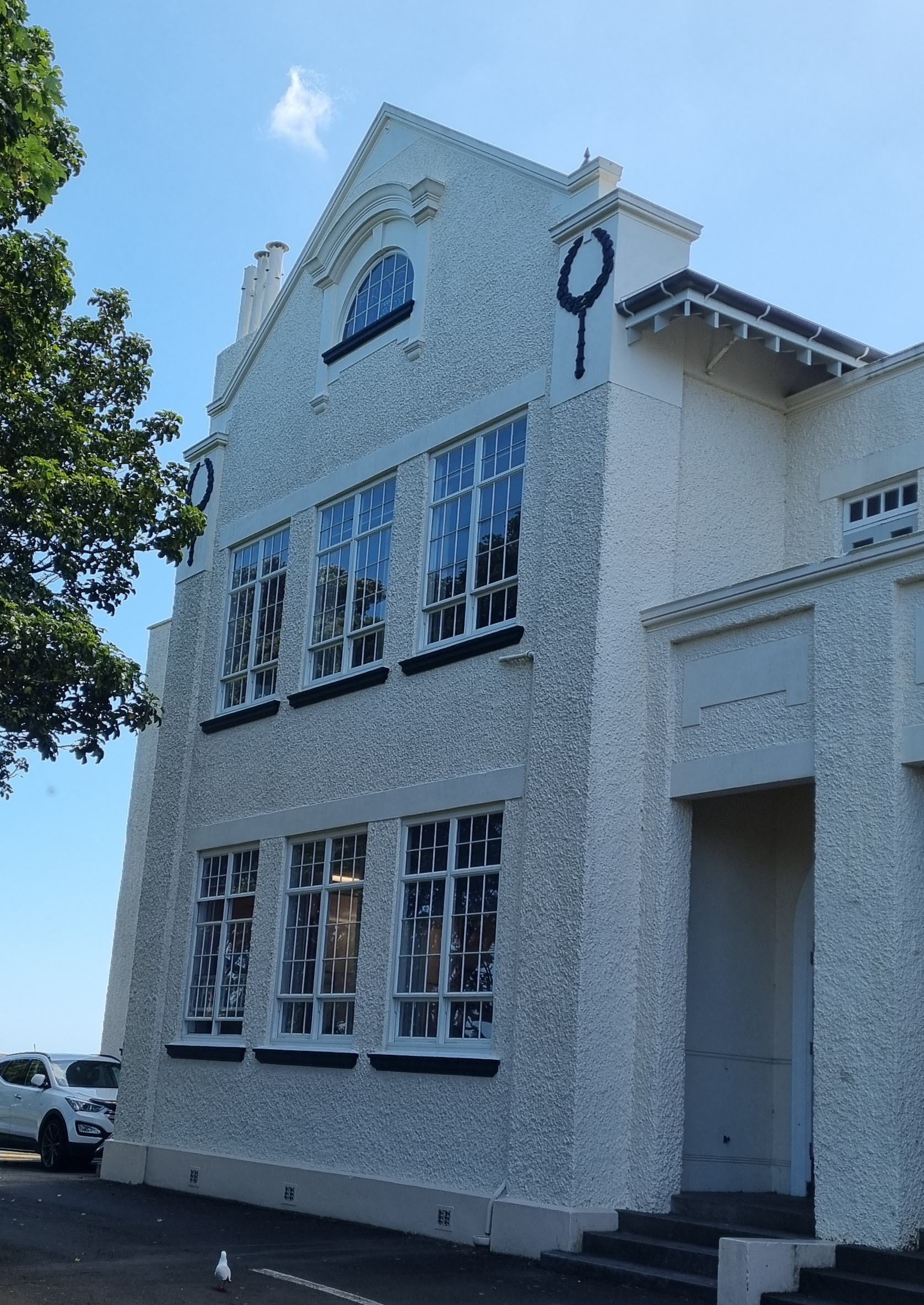
Pridham Hall

Pridham Hall has a large assembly hall and several classrooms and laboratories built around it. The Hall interior is characterised by timber panelling and wooden columns, historic photographs, and polished wooden flooring. The Hall is made of reinforced concrete with a roughcast exterior, and a pressed metal tiles roof with a large roof lantern on the north façade. On the west wing of the building there is a large Elizabethan style window and a large balcony on the front façade towards the cricket ground. The building suffered from a serious fire in 1925, that destroyed the classrooms in the South-Eastern corner, affecting also the roof of the assembly hall. The damage was repaired again by the Boon Bros later that year.

Architecturally, Pridham Hall is a substantial New Zealand example of the Edwardian Free Style, a mode that modernised historical British forms — Gothic, Elizabethan, Jacobean, and Baroque — into a cohesive, contemporary expression. The building’s Elizabethan character appears in its numerous chimneys and large mullioned‑and‑transomed windows, arranged with disciplined regularity. Round‑headed windows on the upper north façade contrast with square‑headed windows elsewhere, while arched entries echo the upper‑level fenestration. The gable ends, treated in a Jacobean manner with Dutch‑influenced curves and plaster mouldings, add sculptural interest, and a roof lantern emphasises the north entry. The north and west façades present an irregular composition of masses and roof heights, while the south and east façades reflect the internal classroom planning with restrained decoration — grid windows, simple mouldings, eaves brackets, and roughcast surfaces. These elements unify the building’s exterior. Inside, the former assembly hall dominates. Lit by clerestory windows, the space features double‑height pilasters and a colonnade of octagonal columns, their plastered surfaces contrasting with extensive timberwork: braced arch trusses, tongue‑and‑groove ceilings, panelled walls, and matai flooring. A first‑floor gallery provides access to upper classrooms, while ground‑floor rooms open directly off the hall.
