= Poet's Bridge =

Heritage bridge in Pukekura Park, New Plymouth, New Zealand

The Poet's Bridge
- Bridge
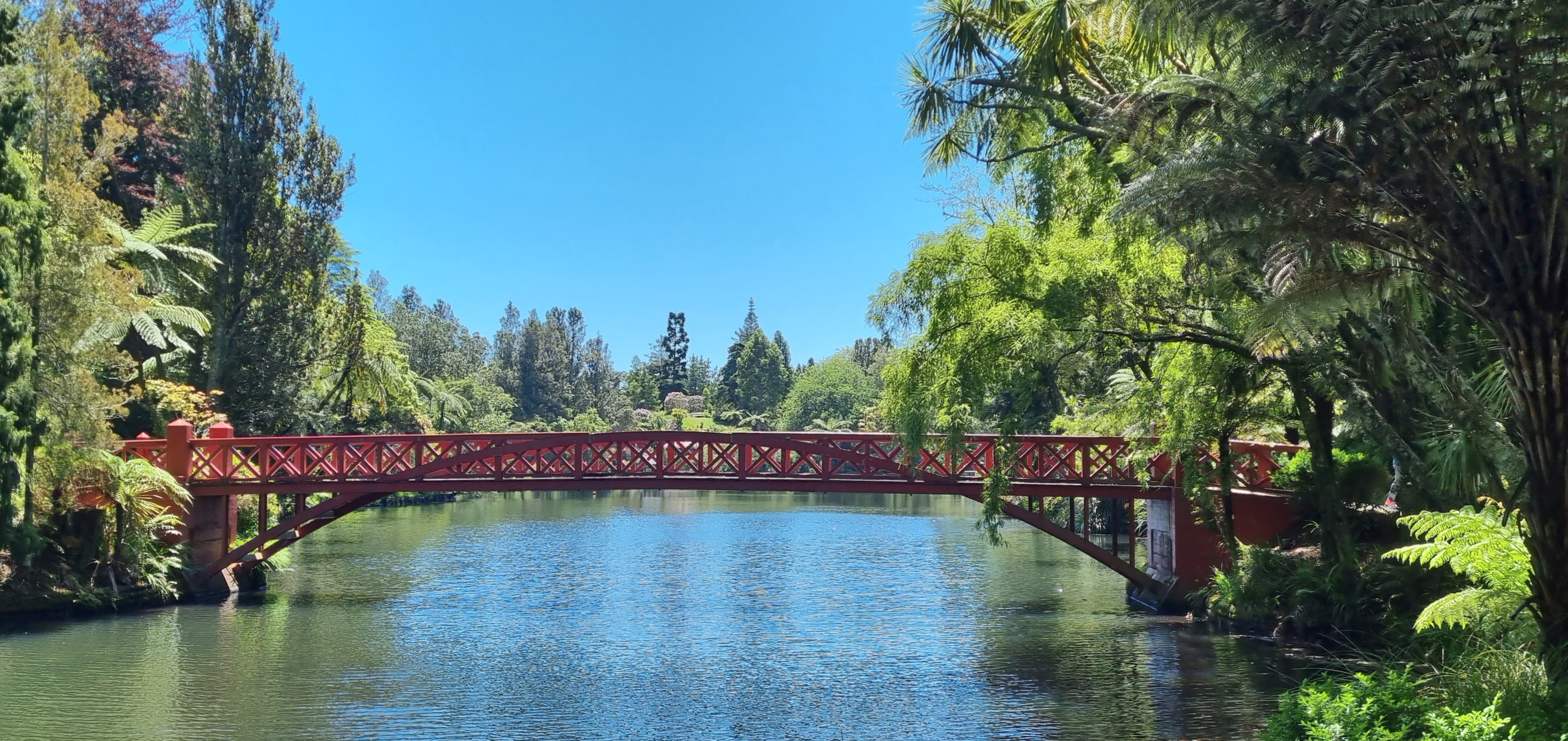
- Constructed: 1883–1884
- Opened: 11 March 1884
- Location: Pukekura Park; New Plymouth; New Zealand
- Interactive map of The Poet's Bridge
- Coordinates: 39°03′57″S 174°04′44″E

Heritage New Zealand – Category 2
- Designated: 14 July 1995
- Reference no.: 7238

The Poet's Bridge is a bridge in Pukekura Park, New Plymouth, New Zealand. Completed in 1884 and rebuilt in 1938, the bridge is known for its red colour and views of Taranaki Maunga reflected in the main lake, and is listed by Heritage New Zealand as a Category 2 Historic Place.

== History ==
In the early 1880s, New Plymouth Recreation Ground board member James T. Davis believed a bridge halfway down the lake in Pukekura Park, would encourage visitors to explore further into the park, which at the time had only rough grass tracks and was difficult to traverse, especially for prams. Lacking funds, Davis and Richard Cock entered a national sweepstake, initially winning small amounts before Cock withdrew. Davis continued alone and won £500, a significant sum, enough to fund the bridge. The winning horse was named "The Poet", giving the bridge its name.

A public call for designs resulted in Henry Vere Barclay's plan being selected from eight submissions. Construction was carried out by contractor Mr. Hooker, with a team including a carpenter, painter, and blacksmith, and was completed by March 1884. The bridge was opened on 10 March 1884 with considerable celebration: bunting, Chinese lanterns, music, fireworks, and a gun volley. The Mayoress, Mrs. Bayly, officially named it "The Poet's Bridge".

The original bridge lasted until 1936, when it was deemed unsafe. A replacement was built with a similar design in 1938, using funds from the Sanders bequest, designed by borough engineer Mr. Clarke. The bridge's now iconic red colour was chosen after a public call for suggestions. A man recently returned from Japan recommended the colour of the Shinkyo Bridge at Nikko, which was adopted and has remained ever since.

In 2023 New Plymouth District Council undertook a major maintenance project on Poet's Bridge, carrying out structural repairs, corrosion protection, and a full repaint to ensure the structure remains safe and long lasting. The bridge was scaffolded, wrapped, and closed to the public for several months, and rowboat hire was also unavailable during this period.

== Image gallery ==
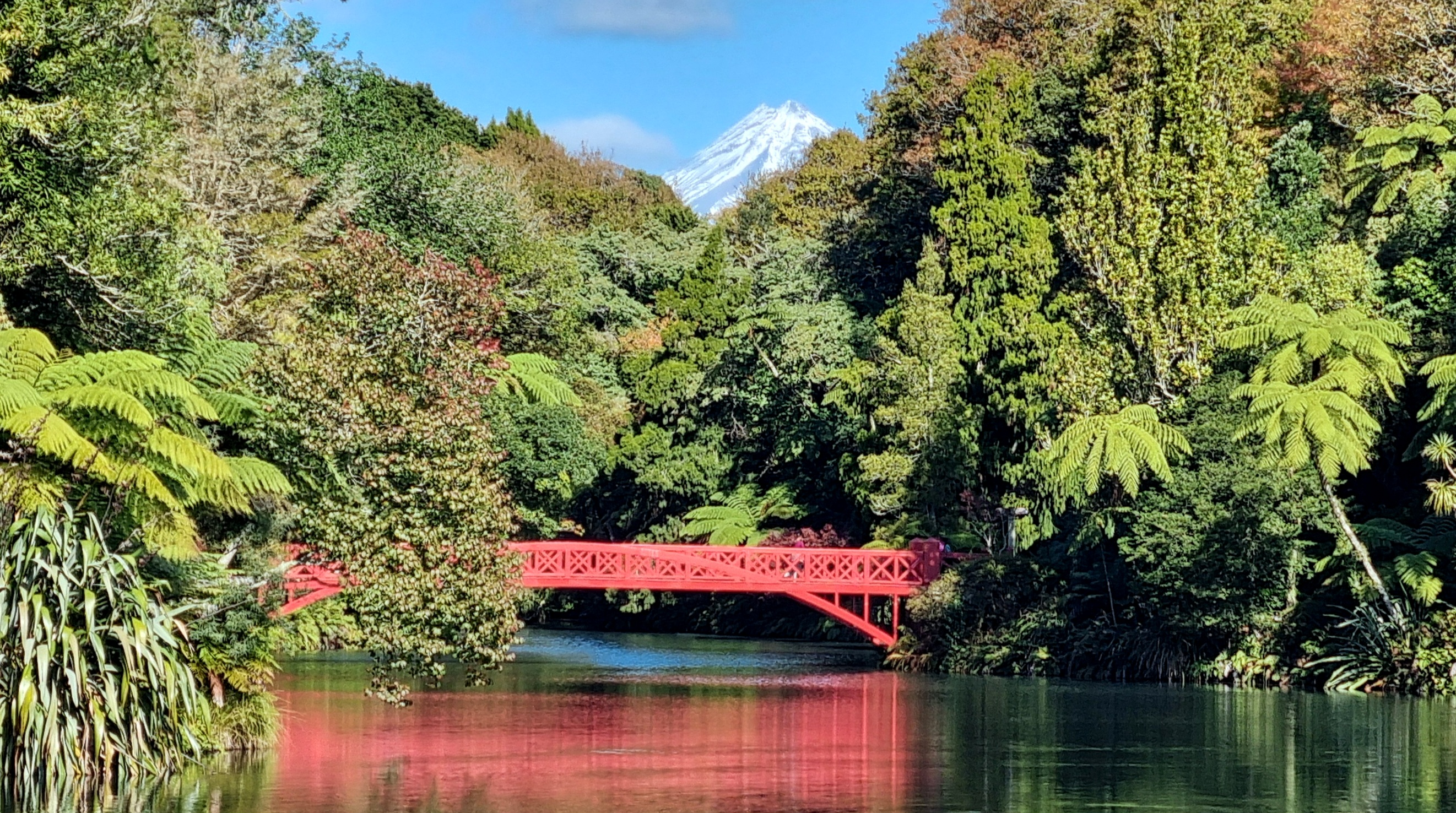
The Poet's Bridge with view of Mount Taranaki in the background

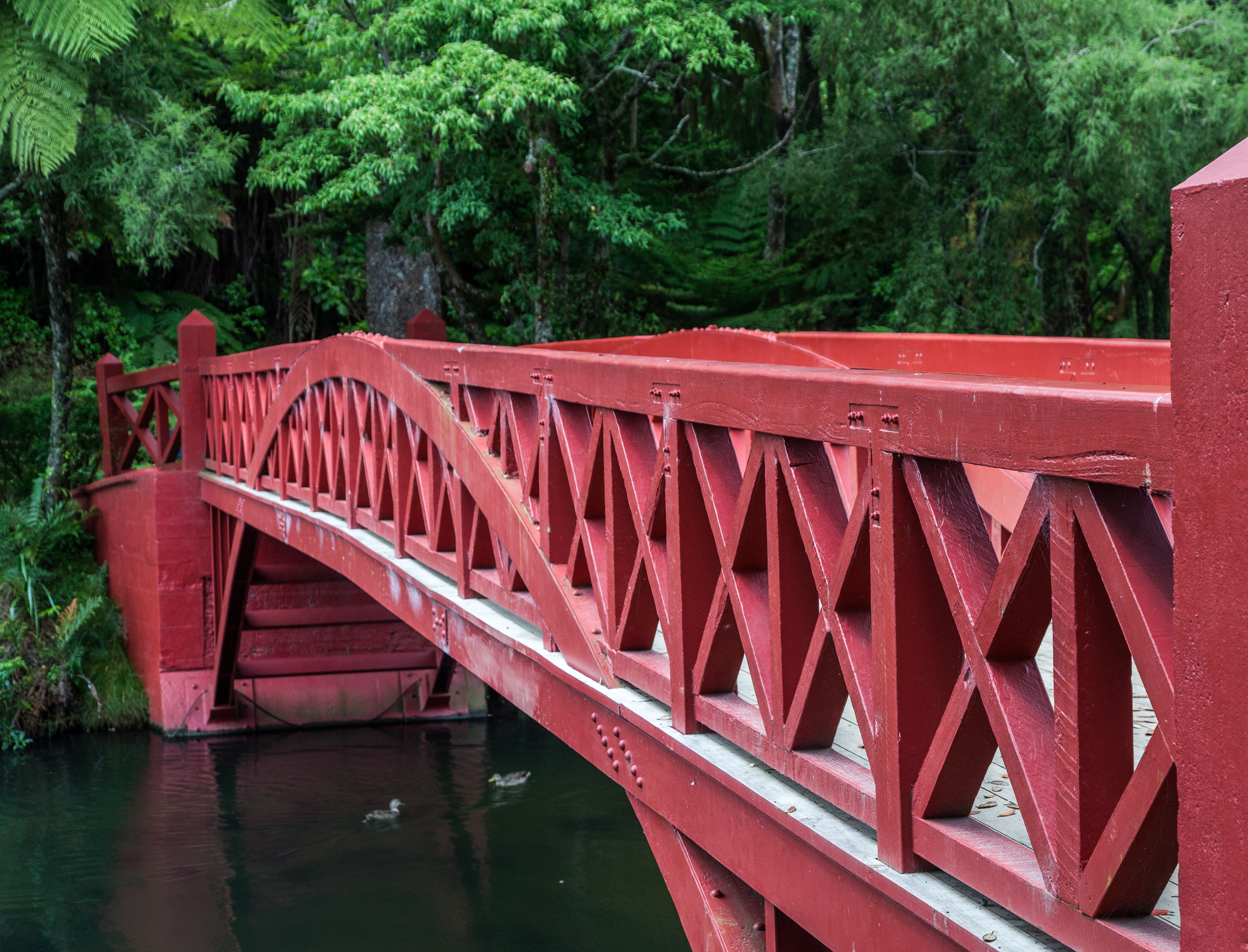
The Poet's Bridge

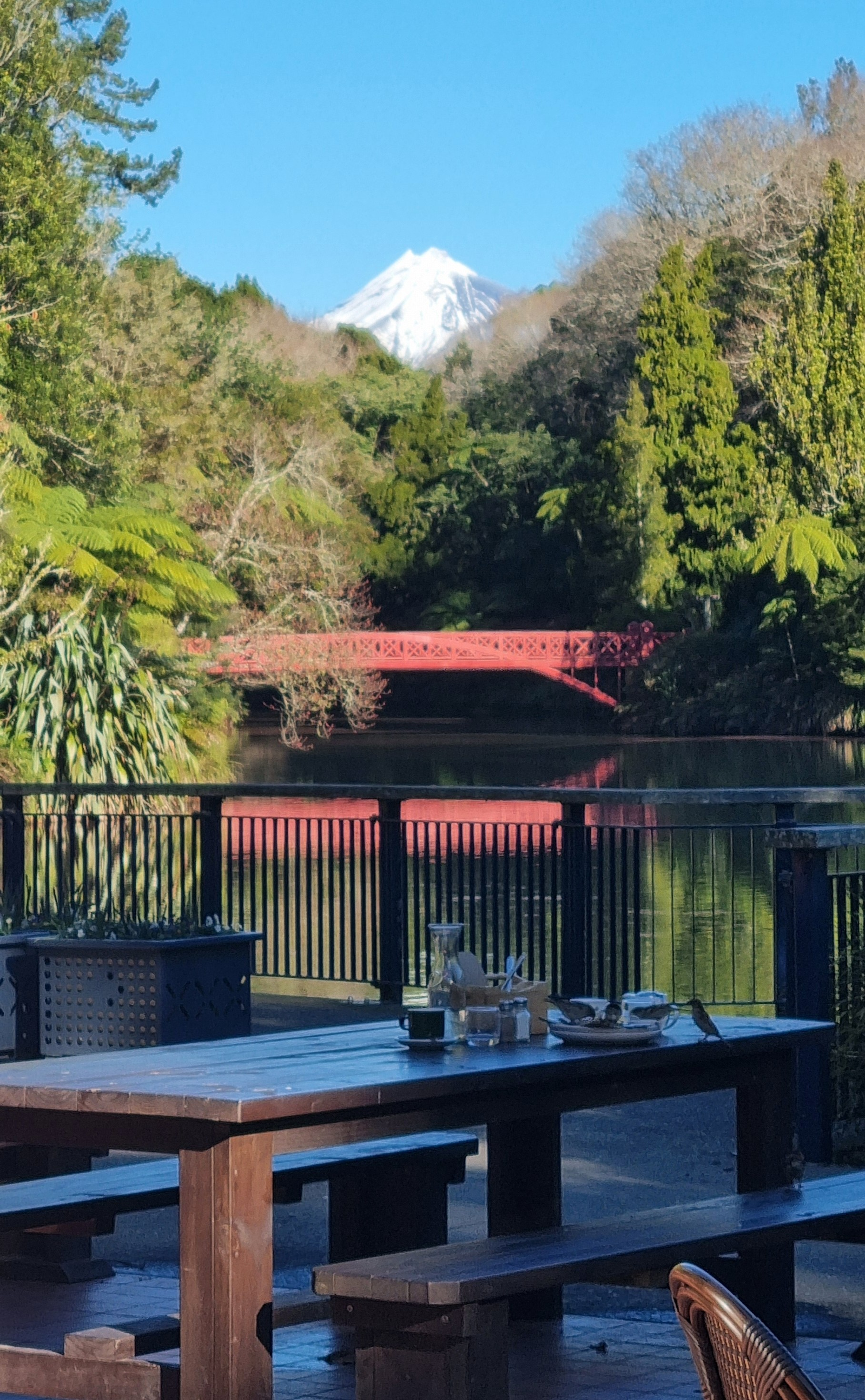
Poet's Bridge in Pukekura Park

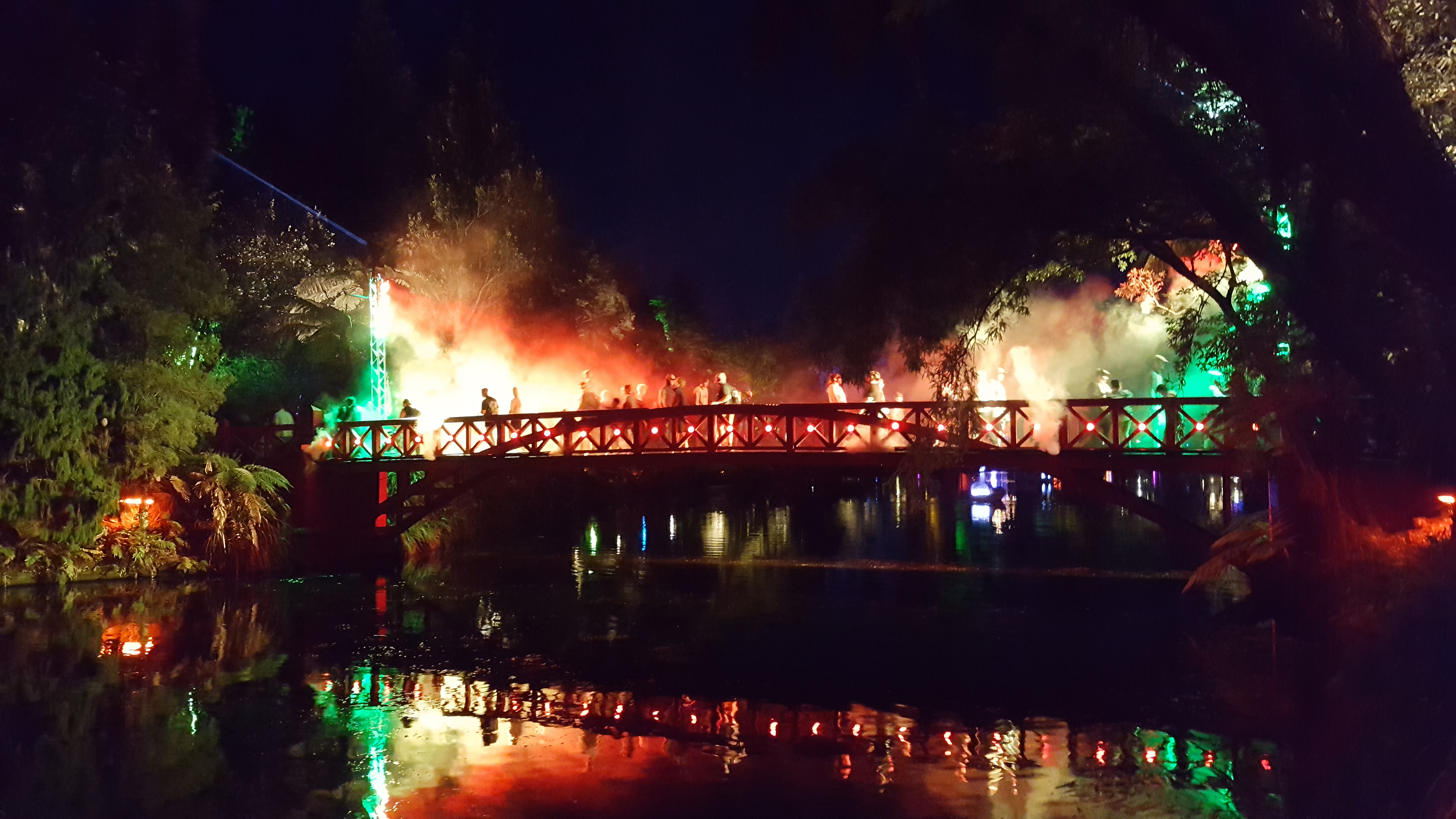
View with the Poet's Bridge during the Festival of Lights

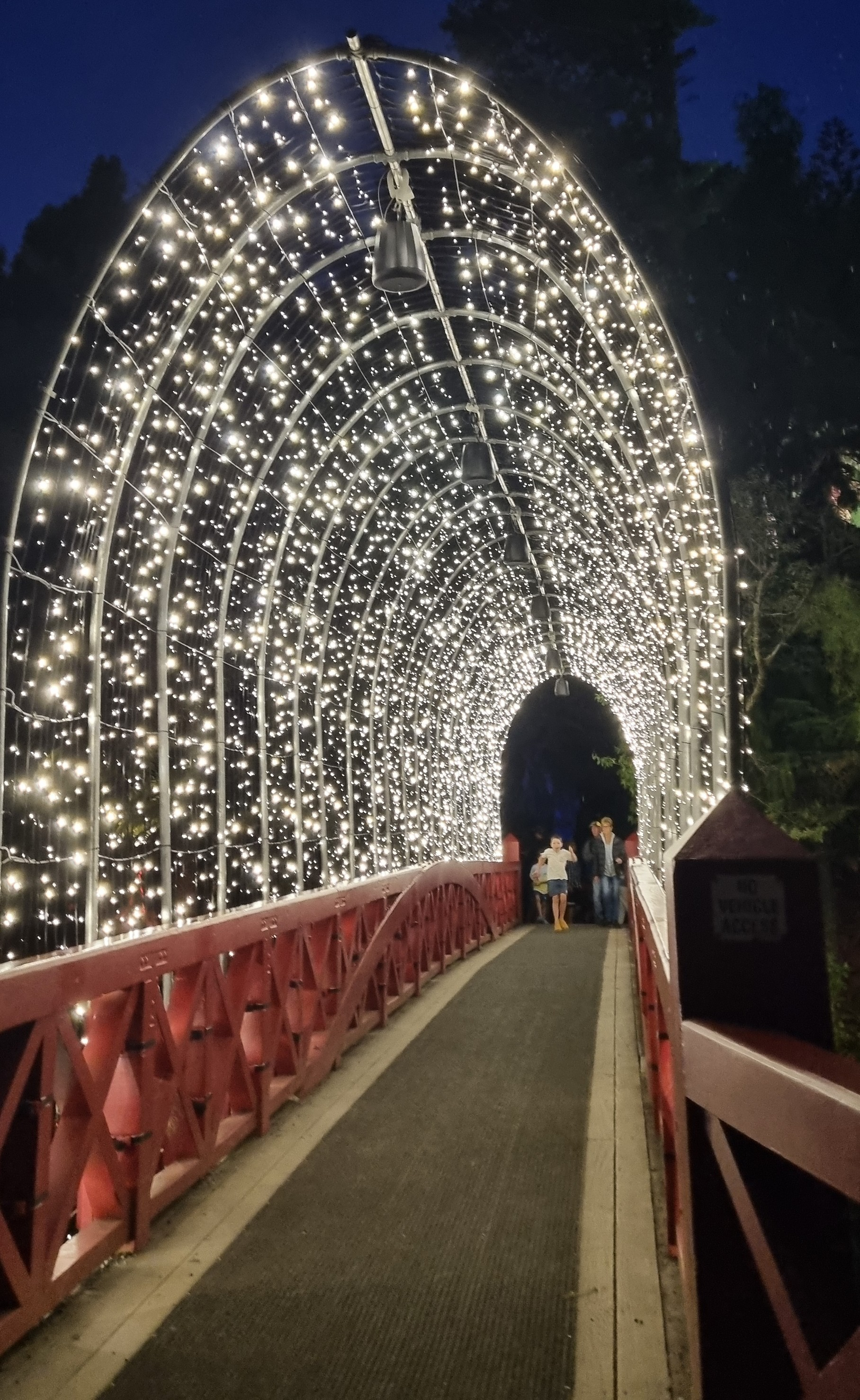
The Bridge during the Festival of Lights

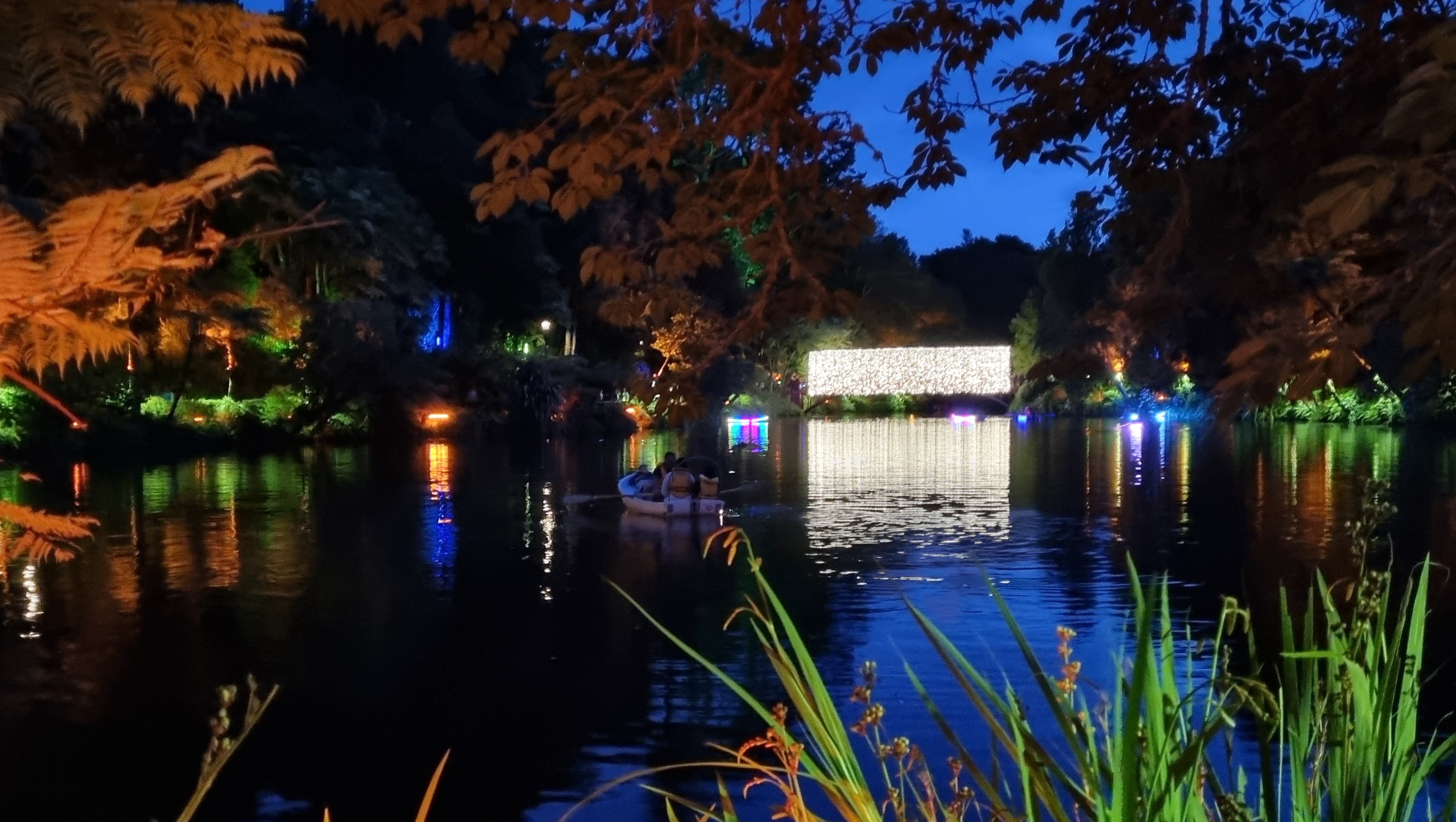
Pukekura Park with Poet's Bridge during the Festival of Lights

Plaque on the Poet's Bridge
