= Brougham Street Offices (Former) =

Heritage buildings in New Plymouth, New Zealand

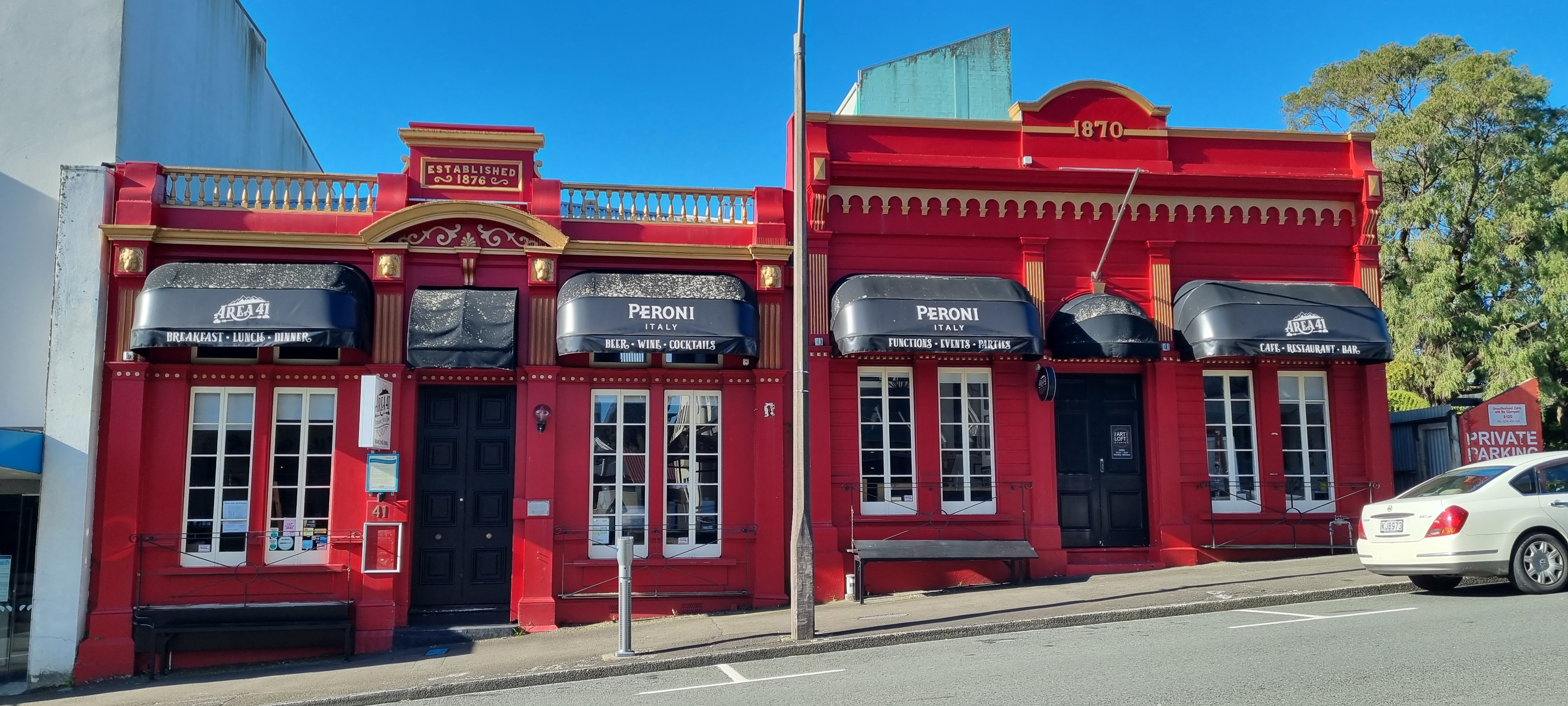
- Brougham Street Offices buildings
- Interactive map of the Brougham Street Offices (Former) area

General information
- Architectural style: Italianate architecture
- Location: 41-43 Brougham Street, New Plymouth Central, New Plymouth, New Zealand
- Coordinates: 39.058555°S 174.073273°E
- Construction started: 1884
- Completed: 1884 (41 Brougham Street) & 1896 (43 Brougham Street)

Design and construction
- Architects: Henry J.T. Edmonds; W.F. Brooking

Heritage New Zealand – Category 2
- Designated: 23 June 2011
- Reference no.: 888

The Brougham Street Offices (Former) in New Plymouth, New Zealand, are Category 2 historic buildings, registered by Heritage New Zealand. They are historically significant for housing early financial and legal institutions and they are rare examples of 1880s/1890s commercial architecture style in New Plymouth.

== Description ==
The site consists of two distinct but connected office buildings:

- 41 Brougham Street: Built in 1884 for the New Plymouth Investment and Loan Society, designed by architect Henry J.T. Edmonds. The date 1876 inscribed on the façade of the building relates to the establishment of the New Plymouth Investment and Loan Society.
- 43 Brougham Street: Built in 1896 as legal offices for lawyer Robert Clinton Hughes, designed by architect W.F. Brooking. The date 1870 inscribed on the façade of this building signifies the year when lawyer Robert Clinton Hughes was admitted to the bar.

The buildings are rare examples of 1880s/1890s commercial architecture in New Plymouth, showcasing decorative Italianate style, noted for being a relatively unaltered example of late 19th-century office design.

== History ==
The Brougham Street Offices buildings reflect New Plymouth's commercial and social history, transitioning from the Taranaki land wars of the 1860s to a flourishing township with growing commerce and administration.

The first of the two buildings (41 Brougham Street) was built in 1884 for the New Plymouth Investment and Loan Society, designed by Henry J.T. Edmonds. It served as premises for financial institutions and later became the site of André Teisonniére's award-winning French restaurant, "L’Escargot", in 1984.

The second building (43 Brougham Street) was constructed in 1896 for his legal firm by lawyer and conservationist Robert Clinton Hughes, a prominent figure in New Plymouth, known for his contributions to politics, conservation, and the founding of Pukekura Park. Designed by F. W. Brooking, it complemented the neighbouring building with similar Italianate architectural features.

In 1995, the two buildings were physically linked when "L’Escargot" restaurant expanded into Hughes's former office, creating a single split-level dining space. After the death of restaurateur André Teisonniére in June 2013, "L'Escargot" closed after nearly 30 years. After hosting some other local businesses, like the restaurants "Mexico" and "Prohibition", and a hair salon, the "Area 41" Italian restaurant now occupies both buildings.
