= Honeyfield Drinking Fountain =

Heritage Drinking Fountain in New Plymouth, New Zealand

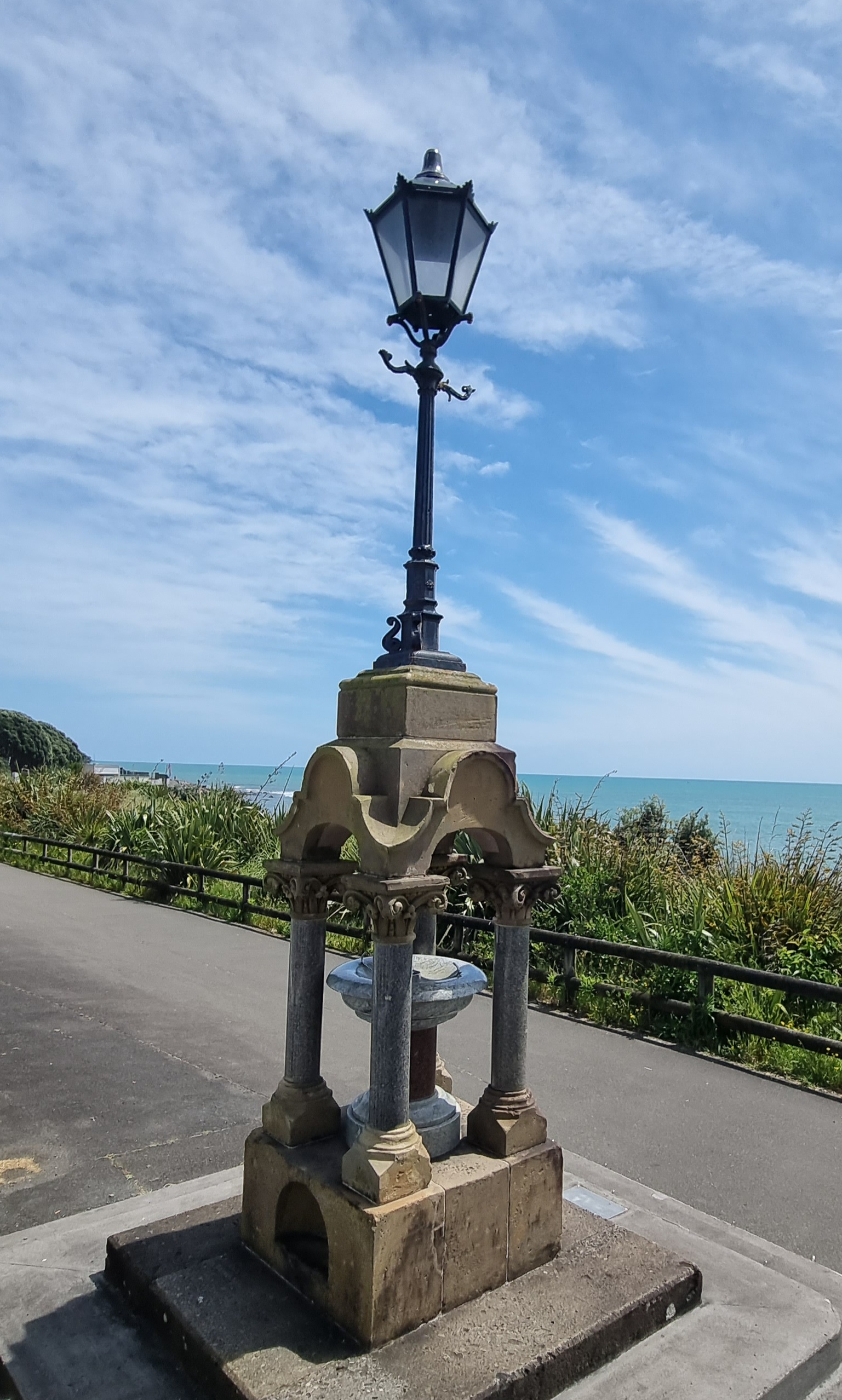
- Honeyfield Drinking Fountain
- Constructed: 1907
- Completed: 1907
- Opened: 14 November 1907
- Location: Regina Place, Dawson Street and Hine Street
- Address: New Plymouth Central
- Interactive map of Honeyfield Drinking Fountain
- Coordinates: 39.056070°S 174.066693°E

Heritage New Zealand – Category 2
- Designated: 23 June 2011
- Reference no.: 894

The Honeyfield Drinking Fountain is a historic Category 2 heritage landmark located on the Coastal Walkway in New Plymouth, New Zealand. Situated at the intersection of Regina Place (formerly "The Esplanade") and Dawson Street, it serves as a functional drinking station for walkers and cyclists along the scenic waterfront. It reflects a period when private citizens and local associations often funded civic amenities due to limited council resources.

== History ==
In the late 1800s, people in New Plymouth began working together to make their town more attractive and enjoyable. They felt the central beach had been spoiled when the railway station was built on prime shoreline, so in 1898 they created the Victoria Esplanade walkway to revive the foreshore and honour Queen Victoria’s long reign. The hope was that this new path would eventually run from the port to the Henui River.

One resident, Alice Brown Honeyfield, believed strongly in the value of the waterfront and in 1907, while already living overseas, donated a small but elegant drinking fountain with a lamp rising above it. She insisted that it be placed on the Esplanade so that it would encourage people to use and support the growing walkway. Alice Honeyfield left the arrangements to her relative William L. Newman, who at first described her only as an anonymous donor. The Borough Council accepted the offer that March, agreeing to supply water and electricity while Alice covered the cost of the fountain and its installation.

The drinking fountain was crafted by Christchurch monumental mason George W. J. Parsons and installed by local stonemason William Short.

The unveiling took place on 14 November 1907, drawing the Mayor, councillors, and townspeople to the corner where Regina Place meets Dawson and Hine Streets. The location was chosen for its closeness to the Railway Station and the Baths, and to encourage people to enjoy the esplanade, which Alice admired as one of the town’s greatest assets.

By the early 2000s the Honeyfield Fountain was crumbling under years of salt, wind, and neglect. People had argued about its fate since the 1970s, some wanting it moved, many insisting it belonged on the foreshore where generations had known it. A 2003 report confirmed the worst: rust, fractures, and stone decay everywhere. Rather than let it fade, locals rallied. A small community group gathered grants, donations, and family support, eventually raising enough money to begin work by detaching the parts of the structure and send the fountain to Christchurch for careful restoration. Craftspeople, including Christchurch sculptor and conservator Mark Whyte, rebuilt the damaged stone, repaired its structure, and replaced the long‑lost fittings.

In 2007 the fountain returned on the Coastal Walkway. Its unveiling, almost a century after the first one, brought descendants of Alice Honeyfield and locals together, sealing its place as a piece of New Plymouth’s story.

The fountain was restored again after being nearly destroyed by a car crash on 27 April 2013 and reinstalled on 28 February 2014. The restoration work, carried out by Stone Conservation Ltd, Auckland, focused on preserving the original stone and ensuring its long-term use as a community amenity.

== Description ==
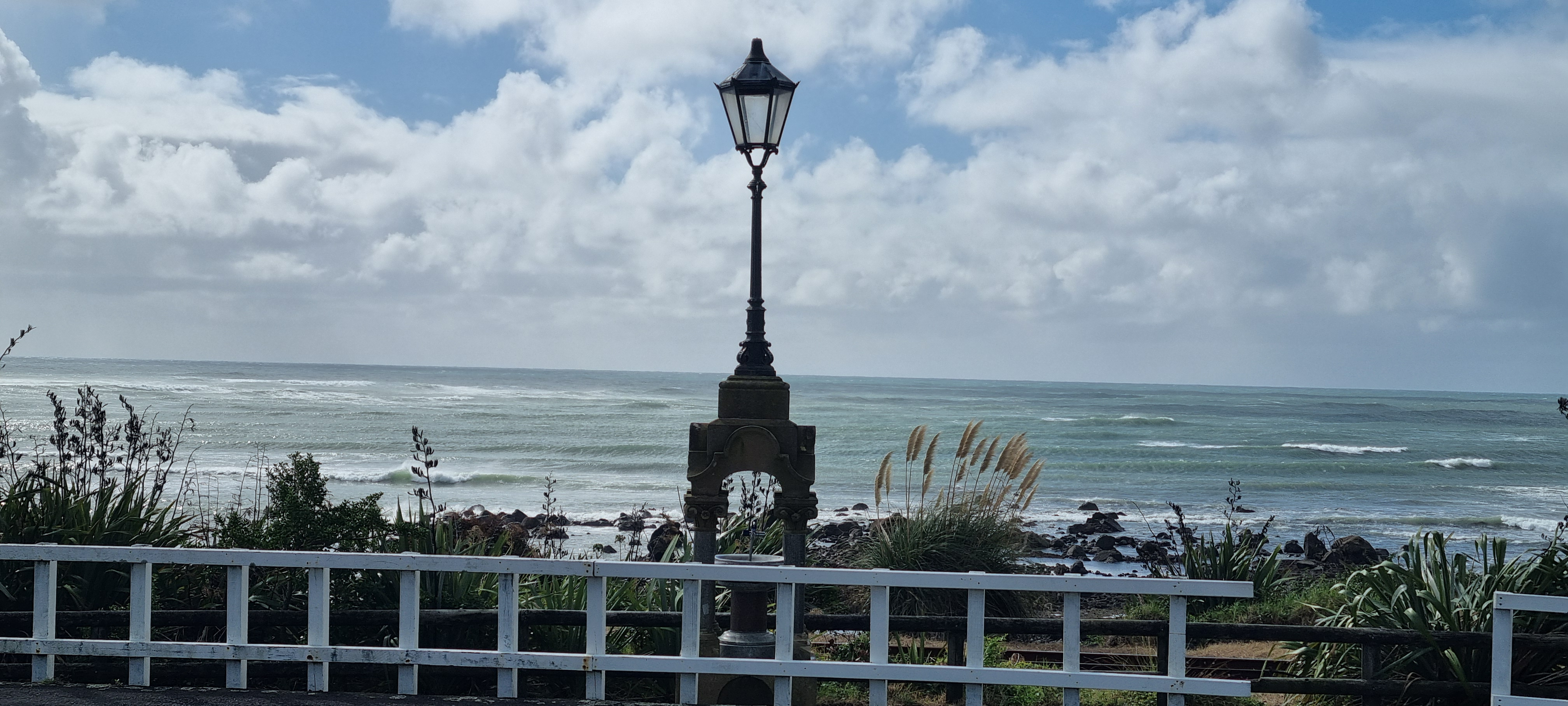
Honeyfield Drinking Fountain

The Honeyfield Fountain is a square, four sided ornamental Edwardian structure, each face aligned to a compass point. It stands on a three tiered plinth: two concrete layers topped by a stone layer, possibly andesite, forming shallow steps. A sandstone block forms the main pedestal. The western face includes a small hemispherical recess containing a projecting metal boot scrape.

Four polished Aberdeen grey granite columns with sandstone bases and Corinthian capitals support the canopy. The capitals show visible restoration work (fissures, replaced fragments). The sandstone canopy has an arched opening on each side, creating a lightly vaulted interior lined with stone of a different grain. Each elevation features a curved pedimental moulding with Spanish Mission influences.

The north (sea facing) side bears the inscription: "1907, The gift of Alice Brown Honeyfield". Above the canopy sits a square stone block supporting a tapering cast iron lamp post with an ornate ladder bar, topped by a replica Victorian hexagonal lantern.

The basin is polished grey marble, continuously fed by two curved stainless steel spouts. It stands on a polished red granite column set on a circular Maitland grey marble base.
